= Diamondback (Kings Island) =

Steel roller coaster

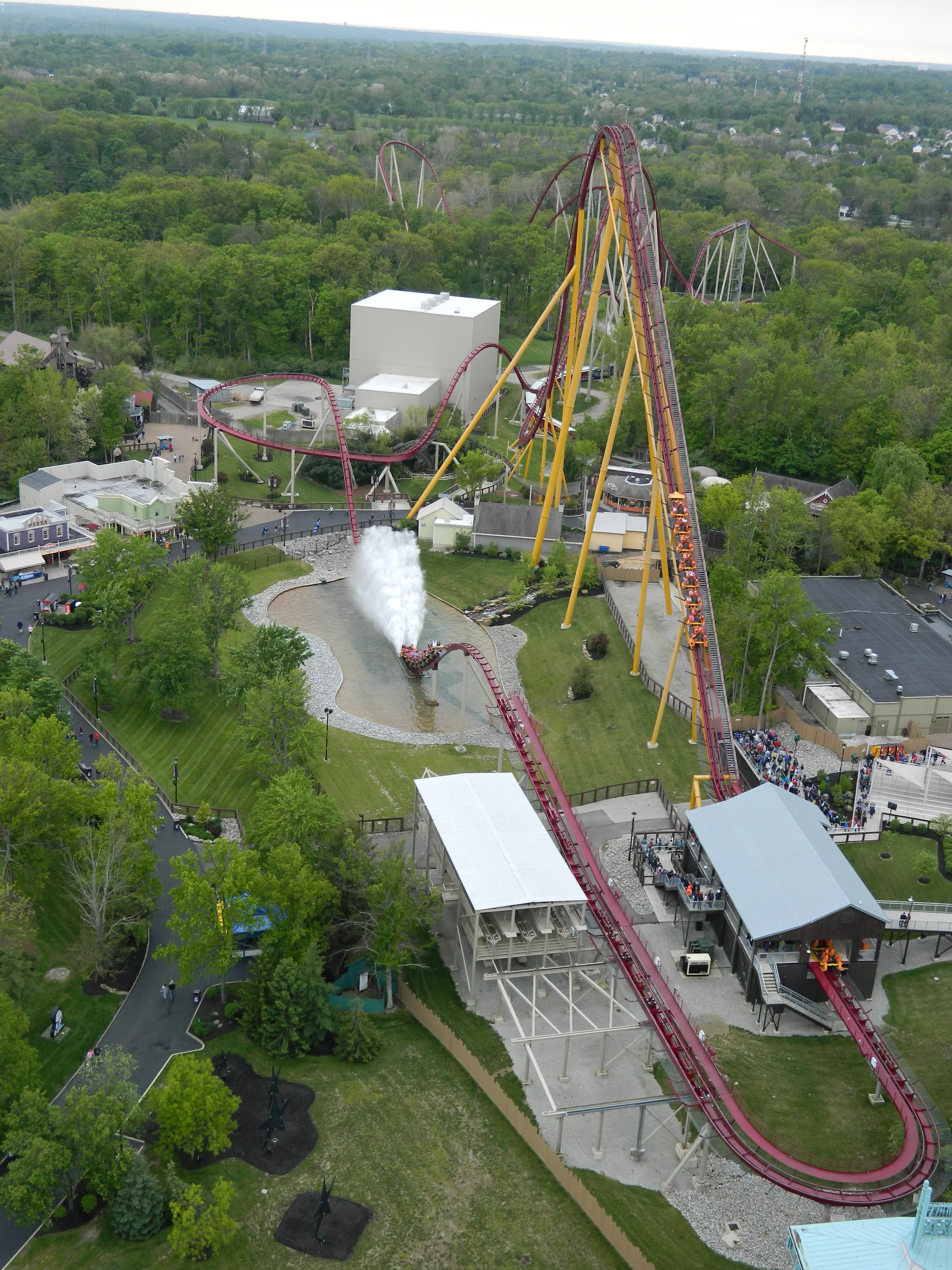

Kings Island
- Location: Kings Island
- Park section: Rivertown
- Coordinates: 39°20′31.51″N 84°16′02.64″W
- Status: Operating
- Opening date: April 18, 2009
- Cost: $22 million

General statistics
- Type: Steel
- Manufacturer: Bolliger & Mabillard
- Model: Hyper Coaster
- Track layout: Out and back
- Lift/launch system: Chain lift hill
- Height: 230 ft (70 m)
- Drop: 215 ft (66 m)
- Length: 5,282 ft (1,610 m)
- Speed: 80 mph (130 km/h)
- Inversions: 0
- Duration: 3:00
- Max vertical angle: 74°
- Capacity: 1,620 riders per hour
- G-force: 4.2
- Height restriction: 54 in (137 cm)
- Trains: 3 trains with 8 cars; riders arranged 2 across in 2 rows for a total of 32 riders per train
- Website: Official website
- Restraints: Lap Bar
- Fast Lane available
- Must transfer from wheelchair
- Diamondback at RCDB

Diamondback is a steel roller coaster located at Kings Island in Mason, Ohio, United States. Manufactured by Bolliger & Mabillard (B&M), the ride opened in 2009 as the first hypercoaster to feature a splashdown effect and the first B&M roller coaster at Kings Island. It is located in Rivertown just behind International Street and the Eiffel Tower. Diamondback was the biggest investment in Kings Island's history at the time, costing $22 million to build, but that figure was surpassed in 2014 by Banshee. The coaster features a 230-foot (70 m) lift hill with a 215-foot (66 m) drop and a maximum speed of 80 mph (130 km/h). It is similar to Behemoth at Canada's Wonderland in statistics, layout, and seating.

== History ==
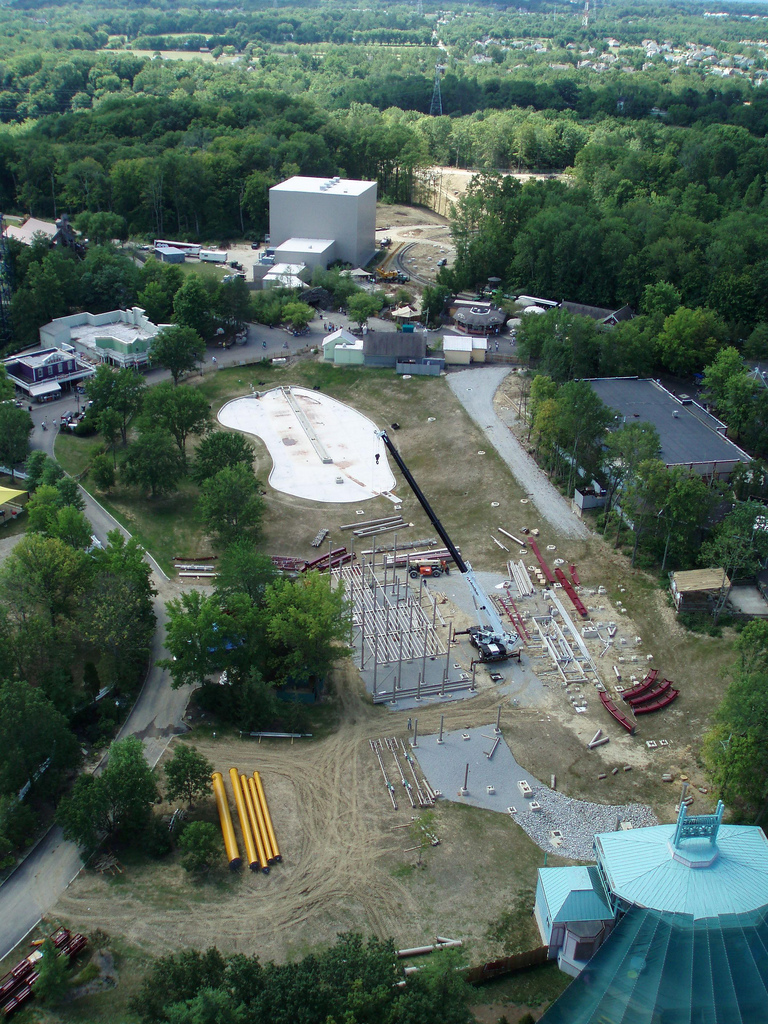
Diamondback during construction

Construction of Diamondback began on October 11, 2007, with the removal of a tree. Swan Lake was drained and filled with concrete before opening day in 2008; this would become the location of Diamondback's splashdown element. Kings Island started teasing visitors during the Fourth of July weekend in 2008 with signs saying, "Ride Sally ride" and "Steep incline ahead." Diamondback was announced on August 6, 2008, as the largest investment in Kings Island history. The ride was topped off with the 230 foot (70 m) lift hill on October 30. The last piece of track was installed on January 26, 2009. Testing began the following month. Diamondback officially opened on April 18, 2009. Diamondback reached a milestone of one million riders in July 2009, and another milestone of ten million riders in July 2014.

=== First rider auction ===
On February 3, 2009, Kings Island announced they would hold an auction for the first riders on Diamondback. The winners of the auction would be given a commemorative first rider ticket, a special gift from the park, and an admission ticket. All proceeds from the auction would go to A Kid Again non-profit organization, formerly known as Adventures for Wish Kids. The first rider auction raised $102,000. The first eight trains, or the first 256 seats were auctioned off. The average bid was $398 per seat.

== Ride experience ==
After the train leaves the station, it begins its ascent up the 230 foot (70 m) chain lift hill. Once reaching the top of the hill, the coaster drops 215 feet (66 m) at 74° over the Rivertown midway reaching speeds up to 80 miles per hour (130 km/h). It then curves to the right up a 193 foot (59 m) hill, past Mystic Timbers' first drop, and then dives into the ravine, curving again to the left. The ride then ascends a 131 foot (40 m) camelback hill and drops, curving left into the hammerhead turn. After dropping out of the hammerhead, the train travels up a 129 foot (39 m) hill (which has a trim brake). After the fourth hill, the train turns down into a 287° counter-clockwise helix, containing the on-ride photo camera, and into the mid-course brake run. After the short brake run the train drops down into the ravine, raising into a pair of bunny hop hills before entering the final clockwise helix of 323°. After the final helix, the train passes over the Rivertown midway a second time and drops into the splashdown finale, slowing the train down before going up another hill into the final brake run. After braking, the train takes a left U-turn and heads back into the station. One cycle of the ride lasts about 3 minutes.

== Characteristics ==
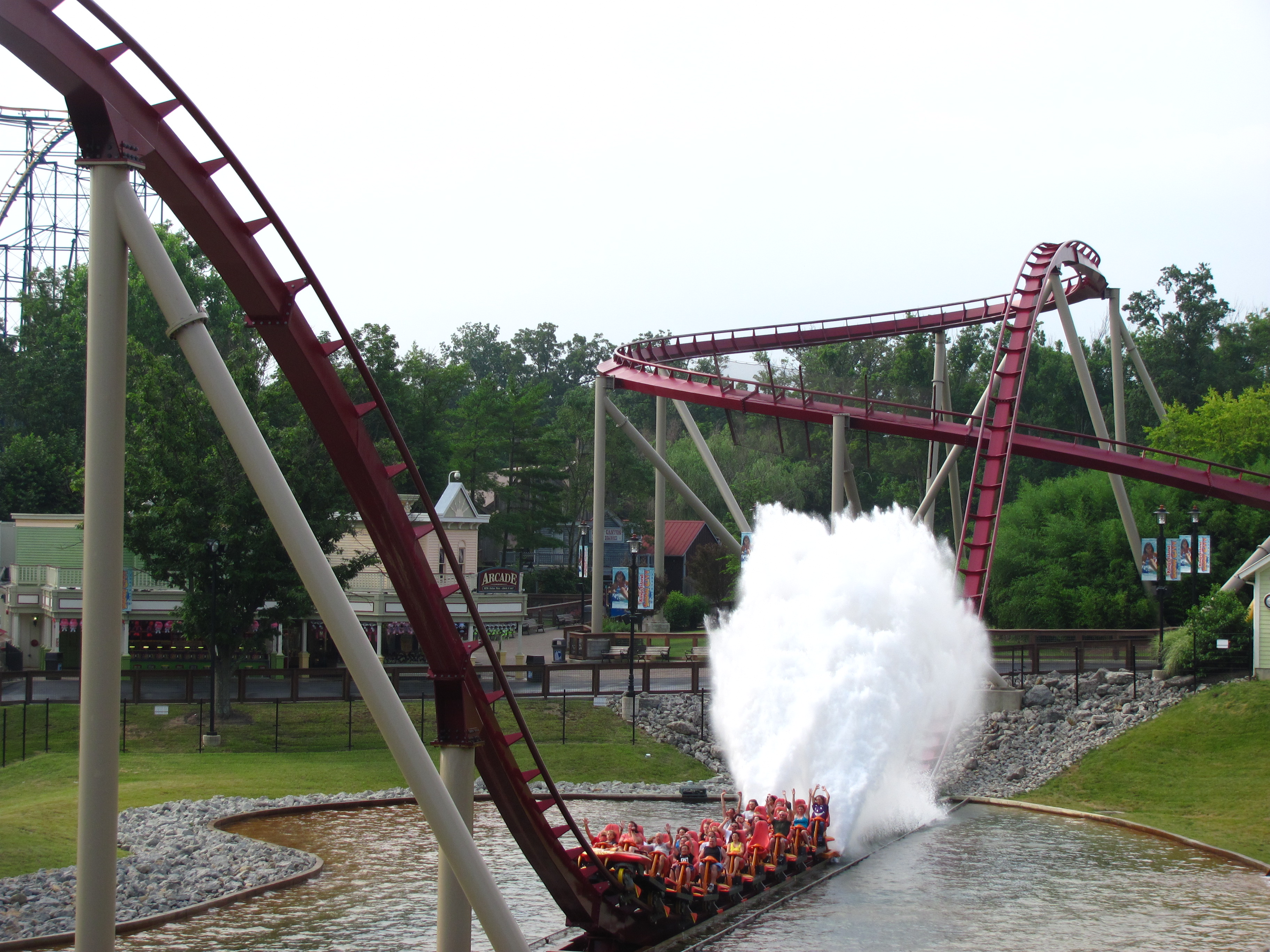
A train in the splashdown element.

Diamondback is the first hyper coaster to feature a splashdown. Scoops positioned at the back sides of the last car on each train send water soaring at heights of 50 ft (15 m) as the train passes. Splashdowns generally do not cause riders to get wet; they are used for a visual effect as well as to slow the train down. The splashdown is located in the former Swan Boat pond.

Diamondback operates with three open-air stadium style steel and fiberglass trains. The trains are the same prototype trains seen on Behemoth at Canada's Wonderland, Thunder Striker at Carowinds and Shambhala: Expedición al Himalaya at PortAventura Park. Diamondback was the first roller coaster in the United States to feature the new trains. Each car seats four passengers, with two front seats set near the middle of the car and two rear seats set closer to the sides of the car, forming a "V" shape. The front car of each train features a yellow/orange snake head with long fangs, while the inside of the trains are black, red, and orange. Riders are restrained by a single T-shaped lap bar. There are three trains total, each train featuring a different fin color: green, red, or brown. Under the sides of the last car on each train are the scoops for the splashdown at the end. For the 2018 season, the original red seats were replaced with new black ones.

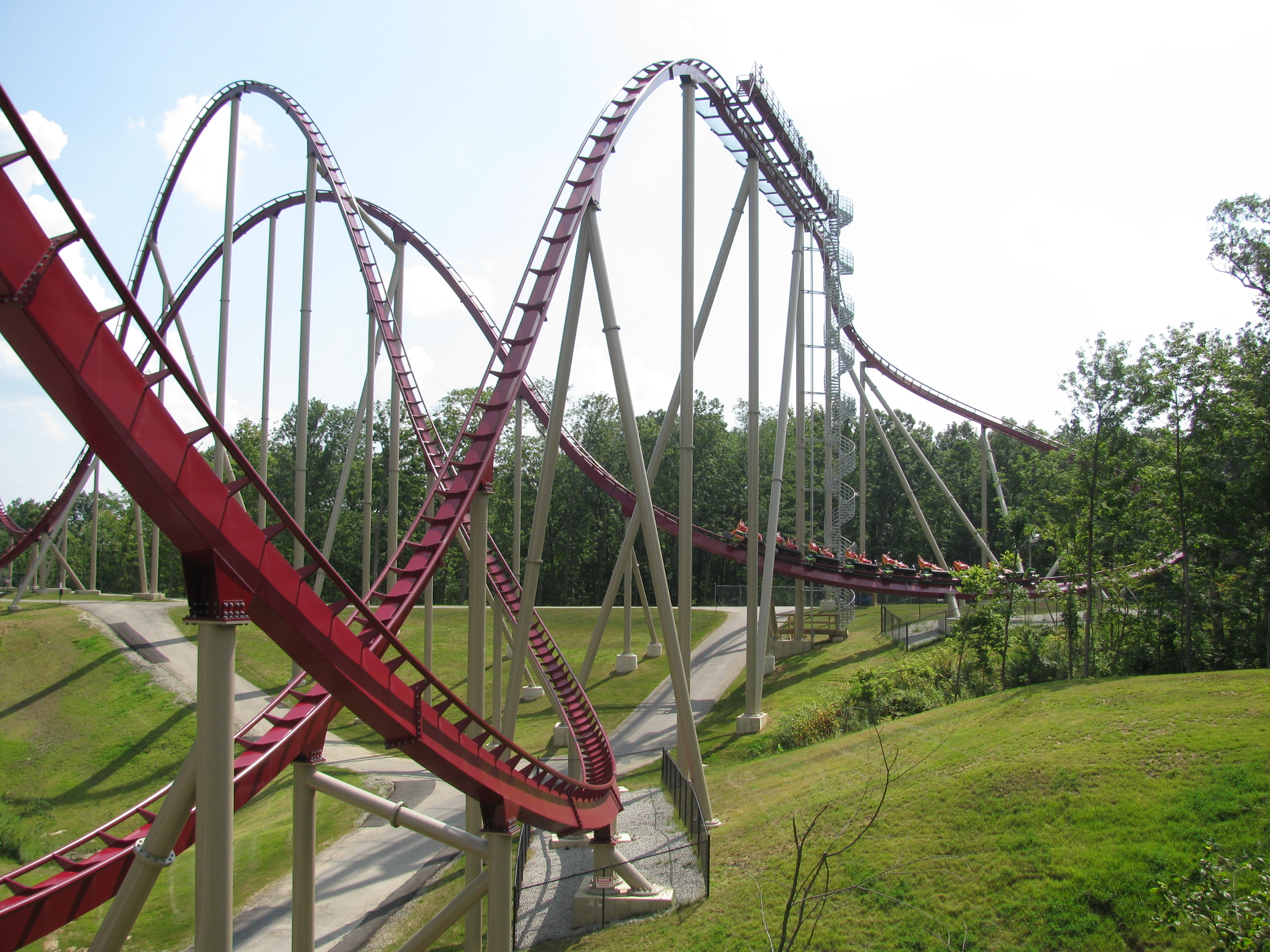
The back half of the ride is located in the woods.

The steel track is 5,282 feet (1,610 m) in length and the height of the lift is approximately 230 feet (70 m). The ride has red track and mushroom brown supports, although from 2009 to 2022, the supports on the lift hill and second hill were painted yellow and the rest of the supports were painted tan. The track was fabricated at the Ohio-based Clermont Steel Fabricators.

== Awards ==
Diamondback won the award for "Best New Attraction in 2009" from the National Amusement Park Historical Association. Also the roller coaster was ranked second in the Amusement Today's Golden Ticket Awards for best new ride of 2009.

Golden Ticket Awards: Top steel Roller Coasters
Year									1998	1999
Ranking									–	–
Year	2000	2001	2002	2003	2004	2005	2006	2007	2008	2009
Ranking	–	–	–	–	–	–	–	–	–	7
Year	2010	2011	2012	2013	2014	2015	2016	2017	2018	2019
Ranking	7	11	10	14	4	11	9	8	10	14
Year	2020	2021	2022	2023	2024	2025	2026			
Ranking	N/A	19	17	26	20 (tie)	19	26			
