= Behemoth (roller coaster) =

Roller coaster at Canada's Wonderland

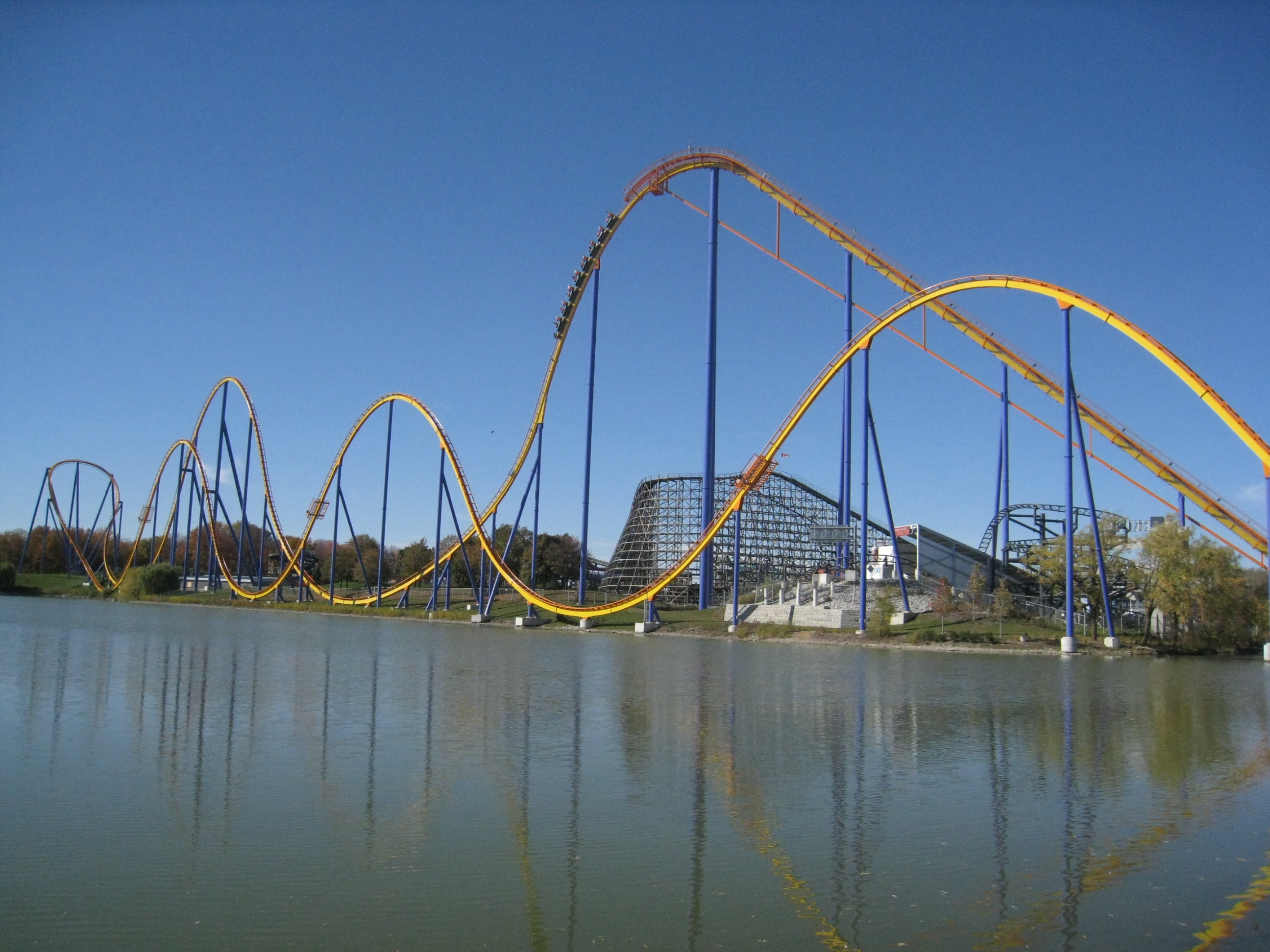
- View of Behemoth from the south in October 2008

Canada's Wonderland
- Location: Canada's Wonderland
- Coordinates: 43°50′20.4″N 79°32′26.3″W
- Status: Operating
- Soft opening date: 25 April 2008
- Opening date: 4 May 2008
- Cost: C$26 million est.

General statistics
- Type: Steel
- Manufacturer: Bolliger & Mabillard
- Model: Hyper Coaster
- Lift/launch system: Chain lift hill
- Height: 70 m (230 ft)
- Drop: 69 m (226 ft)
- Length: 1,620.9 m (5,318 ft)
- Speed: 124 km/h (77 mph)
- Inversions: 0
- Duration: 3:10
- Max vertical angle: 75°
- Capacity: 1545 riders per hour
- G-force: 4.5
- Height restriction: 137–203 cm (4 ft 6 in – 6 ft 8 in)
- Trains: 3 trains with 8 cars; riders arranged 2 across in 2 rows for a total of 32 riders per train
- Fast Lane Plus only available
- Single rider line available
- Behemoth at RCDB

Behemoth is a steel roller coaster located at Canada's Wonderland in Vaughan, Ontario. Designed and developed by Swiss manufacturer Bolliger & Mabillard (B&M), Behemoth opened to the public in May 2008 as the tallest and fastest roller coaster in Canada, a claim it held until 2012 when Leviathan opened at the same park. Behemoth is similar to Diamondback (Kings Island) and Thunder Striker (Carowinds).

The ride features a prototype seating arrangement to ensure an unobstructed view for every rider – a first for a roller coaster of this type. It reaches a maximum speed of 124 km/h (77 mph), achieved in less than 3.9 seconds. Each cycle on the ride lasts approximately three minutes and the track features five air-time hills, two helixes, and a hammerhead turn.

== History ==
Behemoth was announced on 27 August 2007. The estimated C$26 million ride represented the single biggest investment in the 27-year history of Canada's Wonderland. When completed, Behemoth became the 15th roller coaster at the park.

After 17.5 months of planning and construction, steel construction of the track and supports was completed on 22 January 2008. The ride was officially opened on 24 April 2008 for Media Day. On Season Pass Preview Night, the ride was open to season pass holders on 25 April 2008. Behemoth opened to the public on 4 May 2008.

For the 2014 season, seat belts were added to the trains.

== Characteristics ==
Height, speed, airtime characterize the Hyper Coaster.

— Bolliger & Mabillard

Behemoth is rated a five out of five (double black diamond) according to Wonderland's Attraction Rating System. This rating specifies that the ride will have "high speeds and/or heights, aggressive and unexpected forces and rapid directional or elevation change." Passengers of any age must be 137 centimetres (54 in) tall to ride.

Behemoth has a high throughput and accommodates approximately 1,545 passengers an hour, making it one of the most efficient roller coasters in the park.

=== Train ===
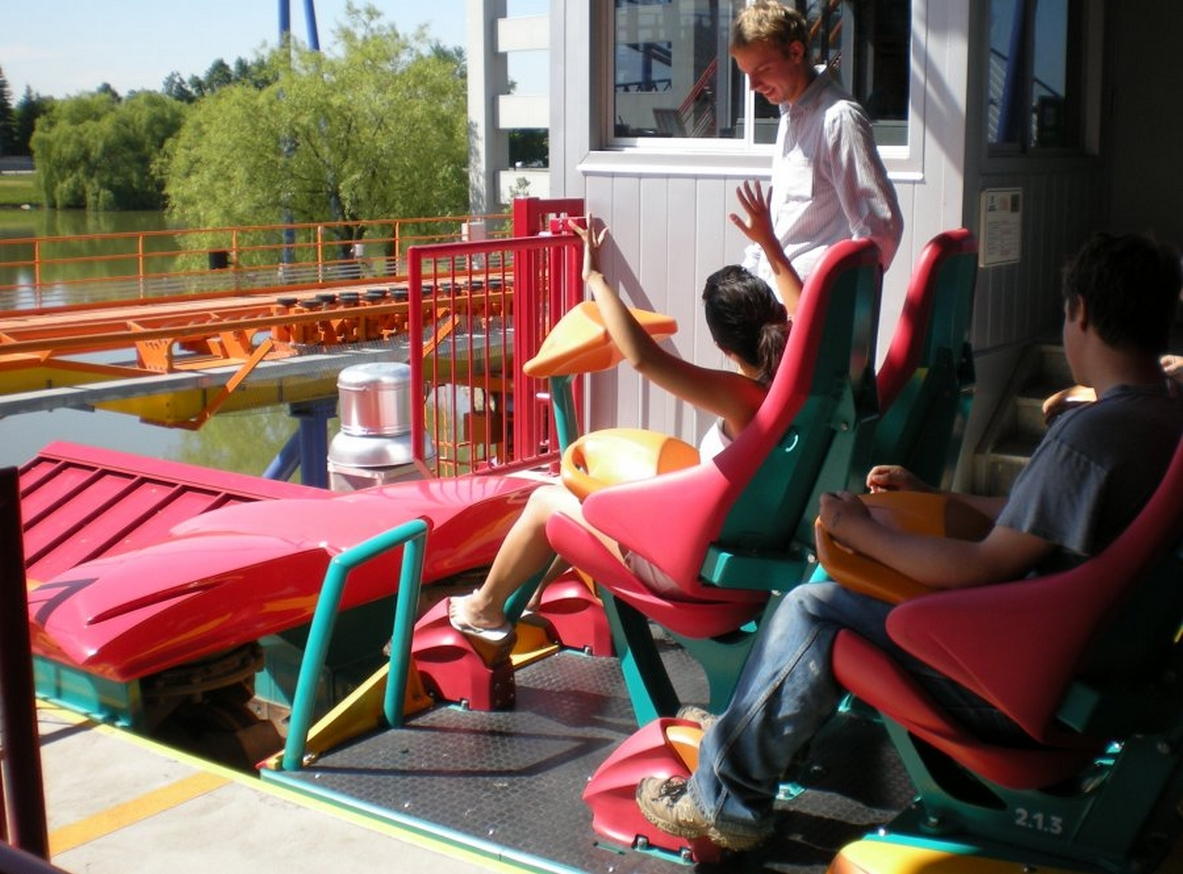
Passengers board an open-air train and secure their harnesses.

Behemoth's three open-air steel and fibreglass trains feature a prototype v-shaped staggered seating arrangement to ensure an unobstructed view for every rider. This prototype design is a first for Bolliger & Mabillard roller coasters which was later reproduced for Diamondback at Kings Island, Intimidator at Carowinds and Shambhala: Expedición al Himalaya at PortAventura Park.

The trains are coloured red, orange and yellow, distinguished by their coloured fronts. Each of the trains comprise eight cars, seating four guests each for a total capacity of 32. Each passenger is seated in a bucket seat restrained by a lap bar harness and a seatbelt, identical to Leviathan's restraint system. Some persons over a certain weight/waist size cannot be accommodated by this arrangement.

=== Track ===
The steel track is 1,620.9 metres (5,318 ft) in length and the height of the lift is approximately 70 metres (230 ft). The angle of the first descent is approximately 75 degrees. The track includes trim brakes and magnetic brakes for smoothness.

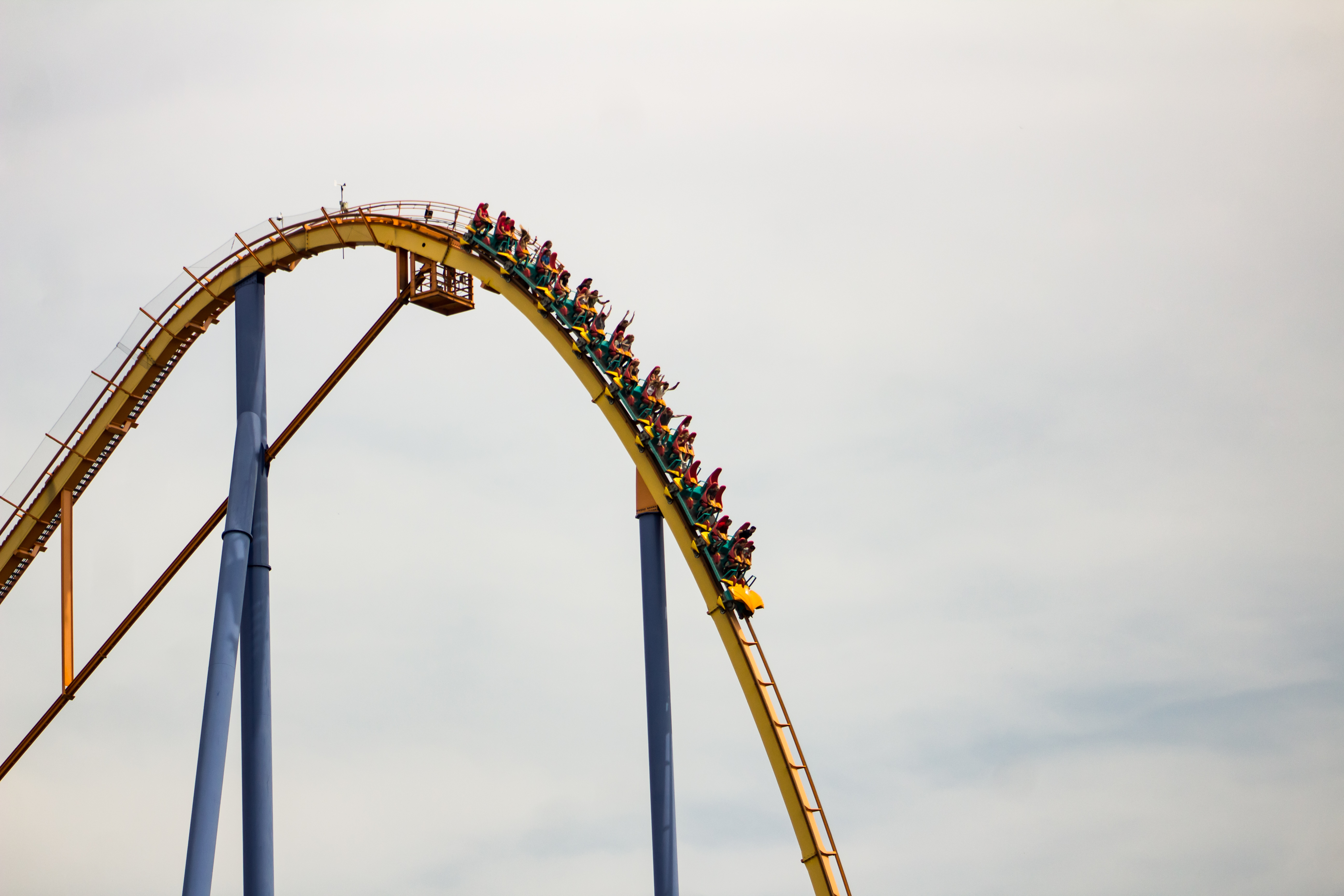
The angle of Behemoth's first descent is 75 degrees.

=== Station ===
A two-storey sheltered station house contains the ride loading and unloading area. The ground floor of the station contains the ride power supply and Programmable logic control system. the ground floor also houses the maintenance area for the trains, equipped with radiant heaters.

At the boarding area, the station features three colour-coded cabinets for loose belongings – one designated for each of the three trains. The operator's booth is also located on the front-right side of the platform.

=== Gift shop ===
Unlike most of the park's other attractions, Behemoth is one of the rides at the park to have a gift shop. The shop sells ride memorabilia and displays the photos taken during the ride.

== Ride experience ==
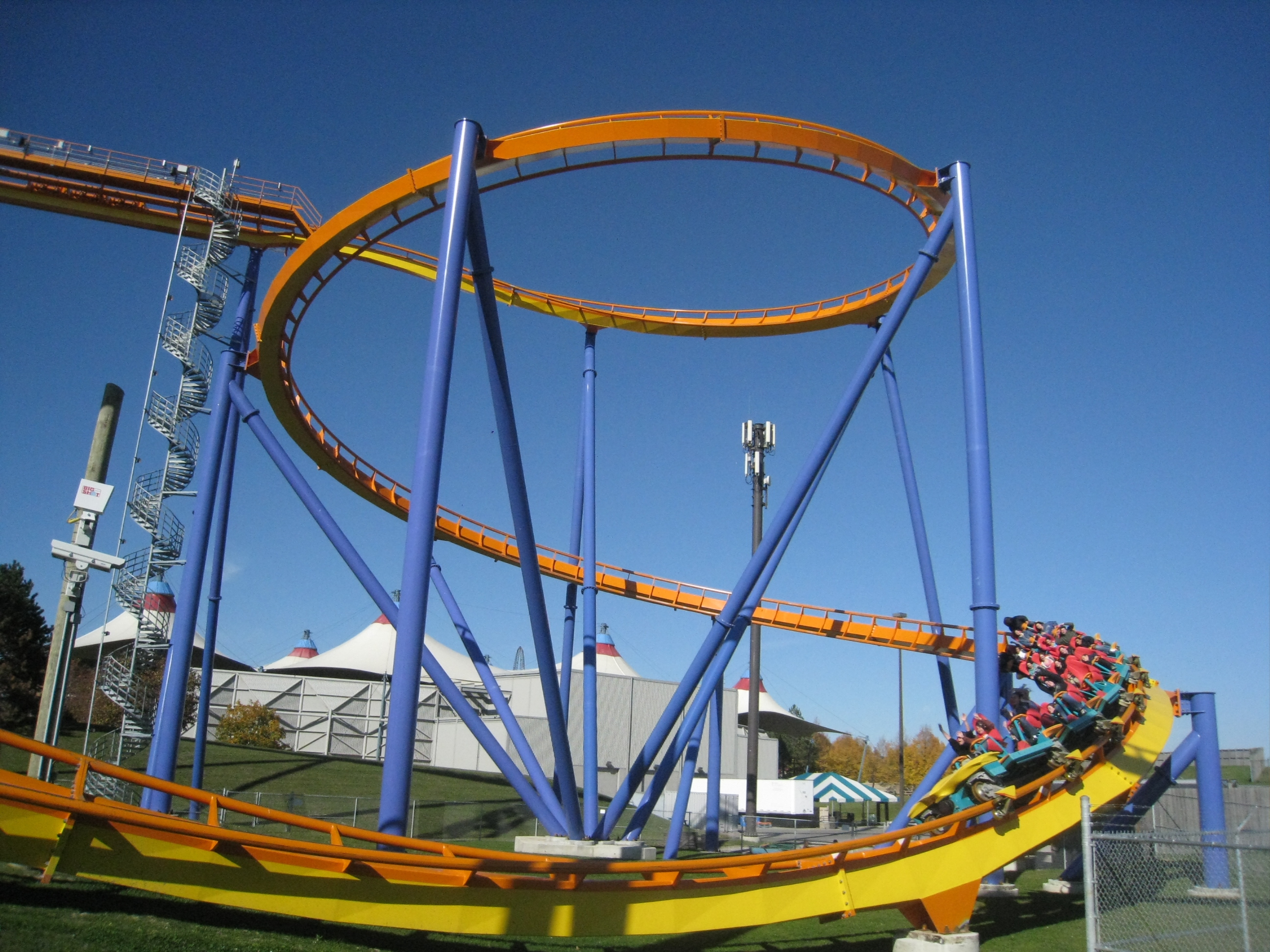
Behemoth's downward 540-degree helix, near the end of the ride

The ride features a prototype seating arrangement to ensure an unobstructed view for every rider. The Behemoth experience lasts for approximately three minutes and subjects the rider to a maximum speed of 124 km/h (77 mph) achieved in less than 3.9 seconds followed by five air-time hills, a hammerhead turn and two helixes. After departing the station, the train turns right and begins to slowly climb the lift hill through the use of a chain lift, taking riders to the coaster's maximum height of 70 metres (230 ft). From the top, a passenger can clearly see the iconic CN Tower to the left and overlook the entire park to the right. The train drops from its peak at a 75-degree angle and reaches a maximum speed of 125 km/h (78 mph) in 3.9 seconds. At the base of the first drop, the train banks a few degrees to the right and climbs the first air-time hill and descends. Following this, the train climbs up to a hairpin 180-degree hammerhead turn to the left. The train descends from the height of the turn to travel up and over three more air-time hills. After the hills, the train climbs up a steep slope into the mid-course brake run.

After the momentary reduction in speed, the train turns to the right and descends into a downward 540-degree helix. Immediately following the first helix, the train climbs into an upward 270-degree helix to the left. Following the climb is a small descent and a final hill. The train climbs up from the final hill into the terminal brake run. The train waits at the terminal brake run until it is cleared for return by the station. The train proceeds forward and turns 180-degrees to the left to return to the station.

== Reception ==
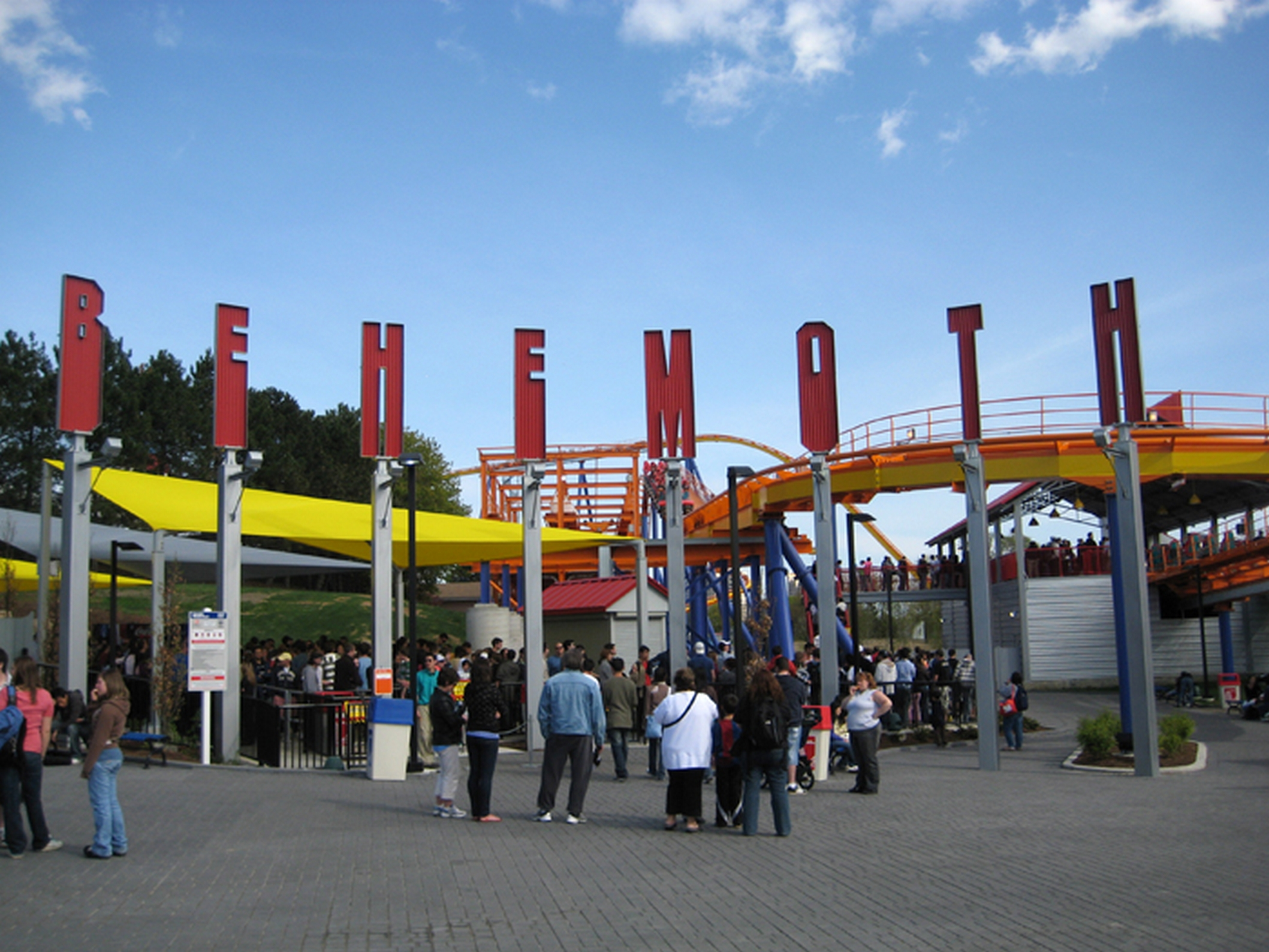
Start of the queue for Behemoth in the ride's inaugural year

Behemoth is one of the most popular attractions at Canada's Wonderland and it has enjoyed a great deal of success since its establishment. The ride appeals to a wide demographic with park staff noting that both young children and senior citizens line up for the attraction.

With the addition of Behemoth, we wanted to complement our already impressive line-up of more than 200 rides, shows and attractions with a world class roller coaster that will showcase Wonderland as one of the premier amusement parks in our industry.

— Raffi Kaprelyan, Vice President and General Manager, Canada's Wonderland

=== Awards ===
The Golden Ticket Awards is an annual set of awards given out by Amusement Today, a newspaper published for the amusement industry. The rankings are selected by an international poll conducted by the newspaper. When Behemoth debuted in 2008, it ranked third as the Best New Ride of the year.

Golden Ticket Awards: Top steel Roller Coasters
Year									1998	1999
Ranking									–	–
Year	2000	2001	2002	2003	2004	2005	2006	2007	2008	2009
Ranking	–	–	–	–	–	–	–	–	29	12
Year	2010	2011	2012	2013	2014	2015	2016	2017	2018	2019
Ranking	13	15	17	17	15	18	24	28	27	29
Year	2020	2021	2022	2023	2024	2025	2026			
Ranking	N/A	38	34	–	–	–	–			

== See also ==
- List of Canada's Wonderland attractions
