= Bolliger & Mabillard =

Swiss roller coaster manufacturer

Bolliger & Mabillard Consulting Engineers Inc.

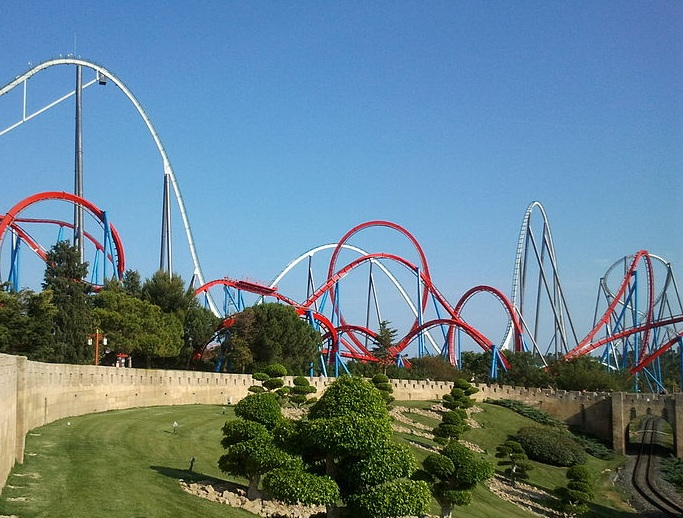
- Two of B&M's roller coasters, Shambhala (back) and Dragon Khan (front) at PortAventura World in Spain
- Type: Private
- Industry: Roller coaster design
- Founded: 1988
- Founders: Walter Bolliger; Claude Mabillard
- Headquarters: Monthey, Switzerland
- Area served: Worldwide
- Key people: Walter Bolliger (CEO); Claude Mabillard (VP); Kim Jent (Structural engineer); Sophie Bolliger (VP/Head of Sales)
- Products: Stand-Up Coaster; Inverted Coaster; Sitting Coaster; Dive Coaster; Hyper Coaster; Giga Coaster; Floorless Coaster; Flying Coaster; Wing Coaster; Family Coaster; Surf Coaster
- Number of employees: 37 (2012)
- Website: Official website

Bolliger & Mabillard, officially Bolliger & Mabillard Consulting Engineers, Inc. and often abbreviated B&M, is a roller coaster design consultancy based in Monthey, Switzerland. The company was founded in 1988 by engineers Walter Bolliger and Claude Mabillard, both of whom had worked for Giovanola.

B&M has pioneered several new ride technologies, most notably the inverted roller coaster and the box-section track. In 2016, the company completed its 100th roller coaster. B&M currently produces 11 types of coaster models: Stand-Up Coaster, Inverted Coaster, Floorless Coaster, Flying Coaster, Hyper Coaster, Giga Coaster, Dive Coaster, Sitting Coaster, Wing Coaster, Family Coaster, and most recently, the Surf Coaster.

== History ==
=== Roots ===
Walter Bolliger and Claude Mabillard started working for Giovanola, a manufacturing company which supplied rides to Intamin, in the 1970s. During their time at Giovanola, they helped design the company's first stand-up roller coaster, Shockwave at Six Flags Magic Mountain. They also worked on other projects, such as Z-Force at Six Flags Great America. Bolliger & Mabillard left Giovanola, but the company continued to use that track design; Giovanola roller coasters, Goliath at Six Flags Magic Mountain and Titan at Six Flags Over Texas, use a track style very similar to B&M's.

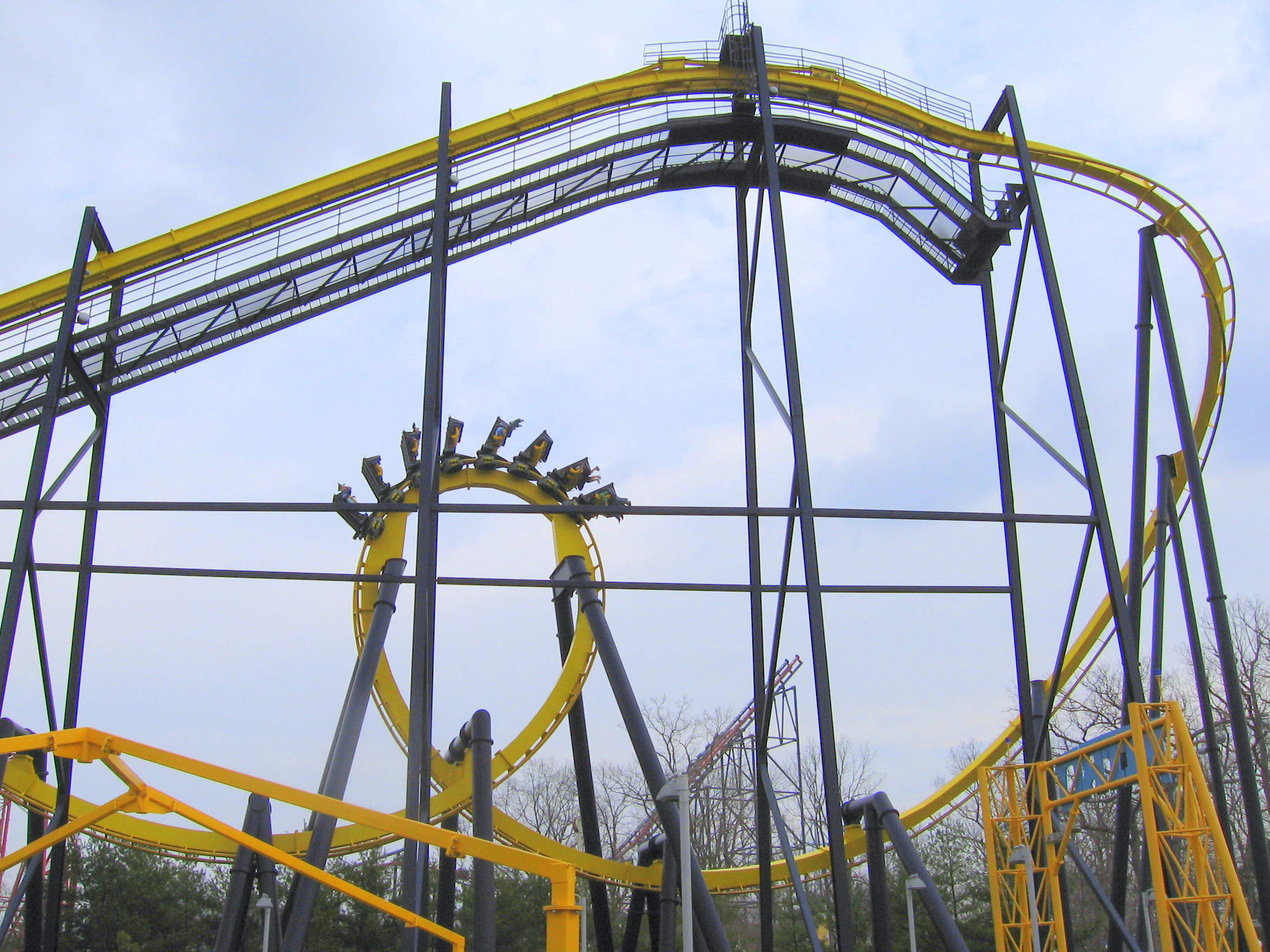
An inverted model with the curved drop, common on inverted roller coasters, Batman: The Ride at Six Flags Great Adventure

=== Launch ===
In 1987, the pair decided to leave and create their own company. At the time, B&M employed four people, including themselves as two draftsmen. When B&M was created, the pair had agreed not to make any more amusement attractions. However, Robert Mampe, Six Flags Great America's staff engineer, had worked with both men during the construction of Z-Force; he contacted the newly-formed company and asked them to reconfigure the cars for its Giovanola-built, Intamin bobsled coaster, to be relocated from Six Flags Great Adventure.

Following that project, Mampe asked the new company to design and build a stand-up roller coaster for Six Flags Great America, similar to Shockwave at Six Flags Magic Mountain. B&M accepted the offer and hired two more draftsmen. But B&M had a problem regarding how and where to manufacture the track pieces for the roller coaster. With the favorable history of the work done by Clermont Steel Fabricators (on Vortex at Kings Island and Shockwave at Six Flags Great America), Walter Bolliger went to the steel plant and asked if they would be interested in manufacturing the track. Clermont Steel Fabricators accepted, and to this day, manufactures all of B&M's roller coaster track pieces for all of North America. Now with a company to manufacture the track, B&M built its first roller coaster, a stand-up roller coaster, Iron Wolf, which opened in 1990 at Six Flags Great America. Two years later, Bolliger & Mabillard built another project for Six Flags Great America, Batman: The Ride, the world's first inverted roller coaster, which brought them to prominence in the industry.

=== Development ===
Bolliger & Mabillard also invented the Floorless Coaster and the Dive Coaster. The company also built its first launched roller coaster, The Incredible Hulk Coaster which is at Universal Islands of Adventure. In 2010, B&M unveiled its new Wing Coaster and premiered the prototype model, named Raptor, at Gardaland in 2011. It has two seats on each side on the car that hang riders over the sides of the track. In 2015, B&M constructed Thunderbird at Holiday World & Splashin' Safari, its first in-house launched coaster. As of 2019 there are fifteen in operation.

By 2010, B&M employed twelve engineers, and fourteen drafters. The company has made other contributions to the roller coaster industry. The company built the trains for the Psyclone, a now-demolished wooden roller coaster at Six Flags Magic Mountain. The trains were later used on the park's Colossus wooden roller coaster (until it was refurbished by Rocky Mountain Construction), but were only used during October each year. The trains faced backward and usually raced against trains on the second track, which ran forward.

In 2013, the company launched the construction of Banshee, the world's longest inverted roller coaster. B&M supplied new trains for Steel Dragon 2000, built by D. H. Morgan Manufacturing in 2000. As of 2025, Bolliger & Mabillard has built 124 operating roller coasters worldwide. Of these, twelve were listed in Amusement Today Golden Ticket Awards Top 50 Steel Coasters List, including the number one selection, Fury 325.

Bolliger & Mabillard completed its 100th coaster in 2016.

== Features ==
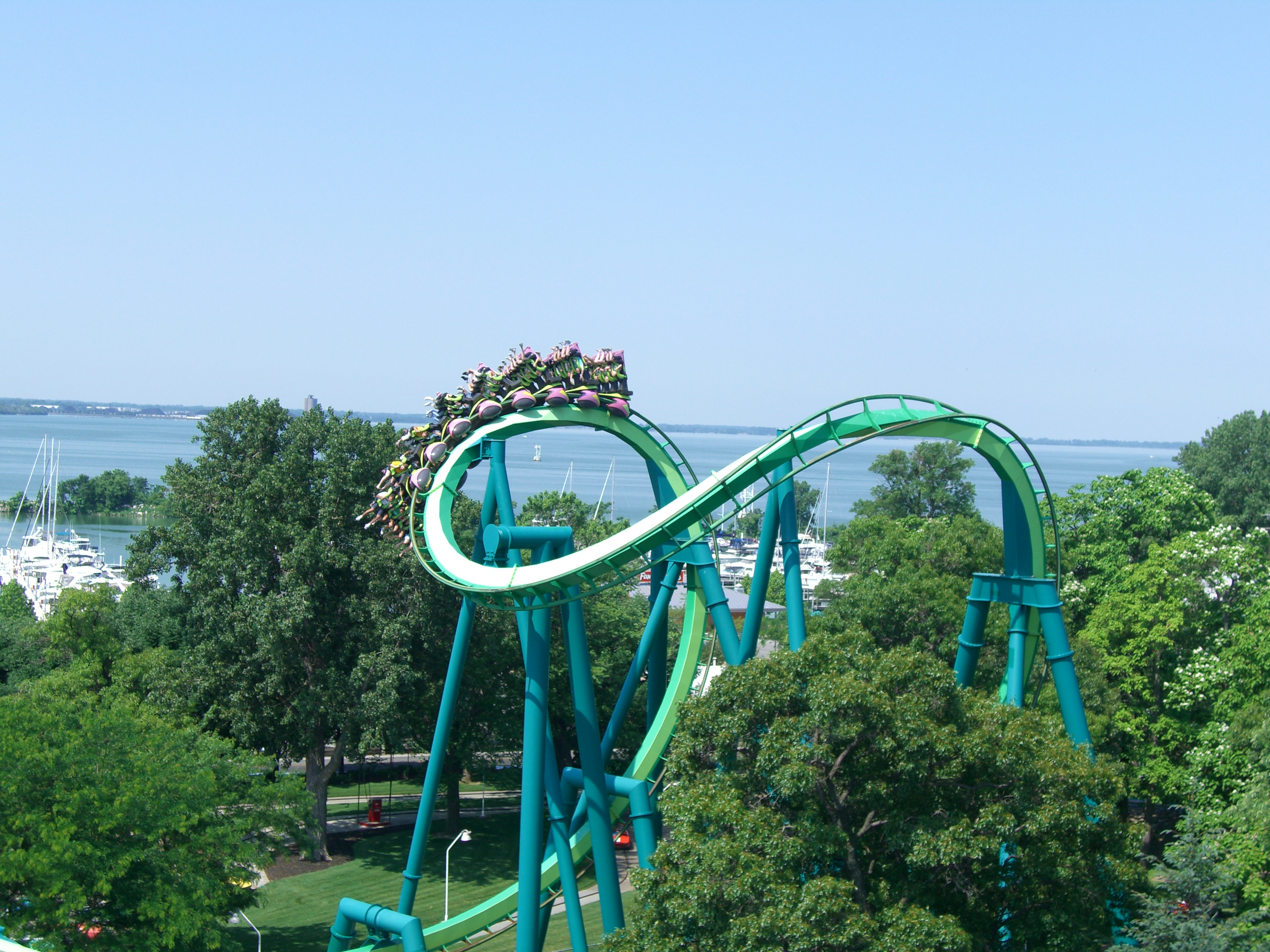
Raptor's cobra roll, a first for inverted roller coasters

Bolliger & Mabillard currently manufactures eleven different roller coaster styles: Stand-Up Coaster, Inverted Coaster, Floorless Coaster, Flying Coaster, Hyper Coaster, Giga Coaster, Dive Coaster, Sitting Coaster, Wing Coaster, Family Coaster and most recently, the Surf Coaster. Bolliger & Mabillard has been involved in developing new technologies and concepts in roller coasters almost since its inception. It has often worked with engineer Werner Stengel and with designers and management of client theme parks.

=== Lift hills ===
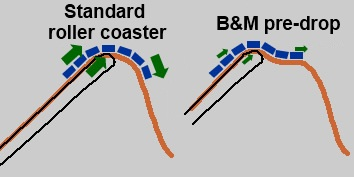
Diagram comparing a standard lift hill and the B&M pre-drop lift hill.

Early Bolliger & Mabillard coasters feature an element known as a "pre-drop", a short drop after the top of the lift hill and before the start of the first drop, designed to reduce stress on the lift chain. The flat section between the pre-drop and the first drop serves as a shelf to support the weight of the train, reducing related stresses on the chain. On most coasters without a pre-drop, the weight of the train tends to pull on the lift chain as it begins its descent because the latter half of the train is still being lifted by the chain. Pre-drops have not been used on the company's Dive or Flying coasters, or on hyper coasters built after 1999. OzIris at Parc Astérix, which opened in 2012, was the first B&M inverted roller coaster that does not feature a pre-drop. Ever since, no coaster built by B&M has featured a pre-drop because the chain accelerates to acquire the same speed as the train when it is being taken over by gravity after it passes the crest.

=== Trains ===
Most of Bolliger & Mabillard's roller coaster trains use four-abreast seating. Each car has one row of four seats, while the train length can vary between coasters. All of the company's coaster models, except the Dive Coaster, Wing Coaster, Family Inverted Coaster and Surf Coaster use this configuration. The Dive Coaster uses six, seven, eight or ten-abreast seating, with two or three rows of seats. For example, Griffon at Busch Gardens Williamsburg, uses ten seats in three rows, while Krake at Heide Park uses six-across seating in three rows. On recent hyper coaster projects, B&M has used a new car design that has two rows of two seats; the two seats in the rear of the car pushed out from the centerline so that the four seats resemble a V formation. This formation has only been used on Behemoth at Canada's Wonderland, Diamondback at Kings Island, Thunder Striker at Carowinds, and Shambhala: Expedición al Himalaya at PortAventura Park, in the resort PortAventura World. In 2013, B&M introduced a new car design that has two rows of two seats, however, they are not in a V formation.

All B&M hyper and giga coasters use a type of restraint called a "T-bar" or "Clamshell" restraint, which consists of bar with a cushioned lap bar with two handles for riders to hold on to. This type of restraint generally does not use a seat belt. However, seat belts have been added to Behemoth and Leviathan at Canada's Wonderland, Diamondback and Orion at Kings Island, and Thunder Striker and Fury 325 at Carowinds. Bolliger & Mabillard also uses over-the-shoulder restraints, in that the restraint is placed over the riders' shoulders and sits and extends to the riders' laps. This type of restraint is used on Dive, Inverted, Sitting, Flying, Floorless, Stand-up and Wing Coasters. Bolliger & Mabillard has recently begun using a vest like over the shoulder restraint, which reduces headbanging found on the older, more common padded over the shoulder restraints.

=== Track ===
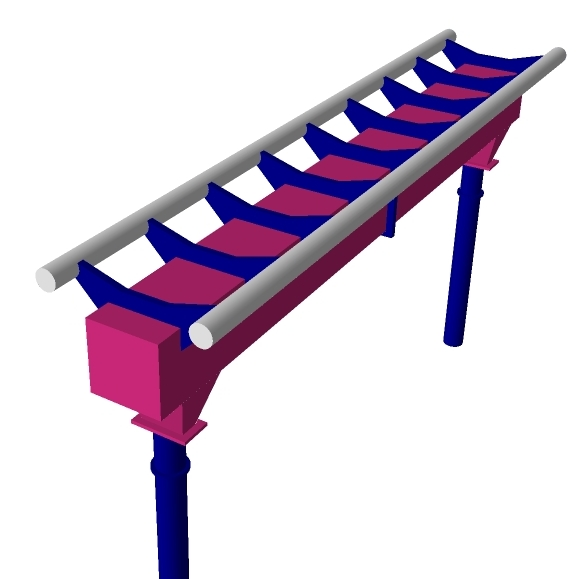
CAD model of B&M's box-spined track

Bolliger & Mabillard roller coasters use track where the running rails are connected to a square box spine constructed from flat triangles. The spine of some of Bolliger & Mabillard's roller coasters, such as GateKeeper at Cedar Point, is filled with a sound dampening material to reduce noise. The size of the track varies depending on the ride's trains, Models such as the Flying, Wing and Dive Coaster have heavier trains which require a larger track size, while models with lighter trains, such as the Stand-Up and Hyper Coaster, do not and use a smaller sized track.

=== Brakes ===
As of 2016, Bolliger & Mabillard uses three types of braking systems: friction, magnetic, and water.

==== Friction brakes ====
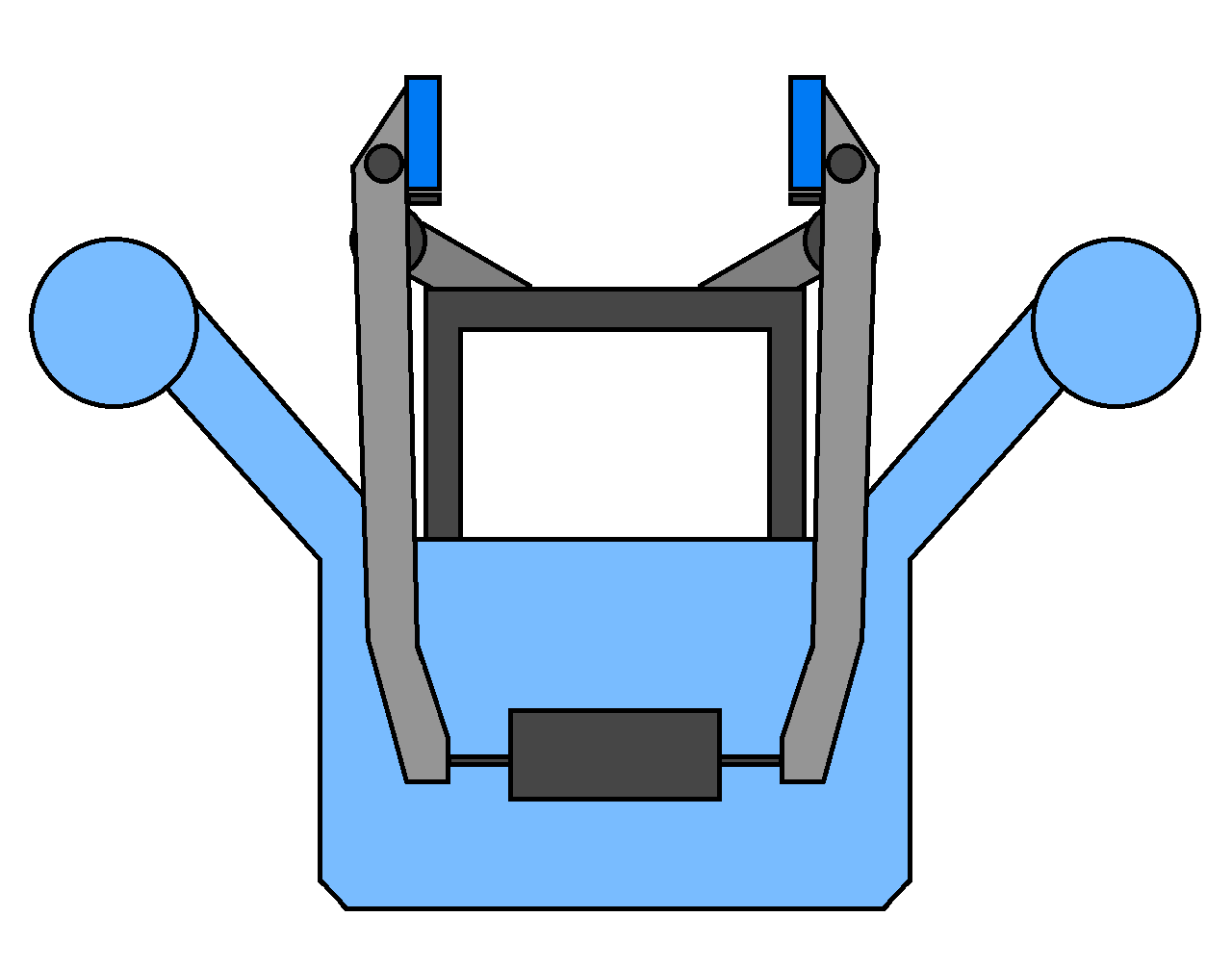
A diagram of B&M's friction brakes

When B&M was first founded, the linear magnetic eddy brake had yet to be developed, so it used friction brakes as its main braking system. On the train, pads are fitted on the vehicle chassis between the wheel assemblies. On the brakes, similar pads are connected to steel supports. When the pads on the train come into contact with the brakes, friction is created which slows the train. Beginning with Kumba in 1993, friction brakes have also been used as trim brakes that regulate the speed of the train while it is still navigating the course.

==== Magnetic brakes ====
Magnetic brakes provide smoother deceleration than friction brakes; most B&M roller coasters built after 2001 (starting with Nitro) have at least one set of magnetic brakes. Magnetic brakes do not make contact with the train. Metal fins that run parallel to the train are fitted on the vehicle chassis between the wheel assemblies. As the fins pass through the brakes, the magnetic field created by the brakes slows the train. Magnetic brakes have also been used as an alternate type of trim brake on B&M roller coasters such as Leviathan at Canada's Wonderland.

==== Water brakes ====
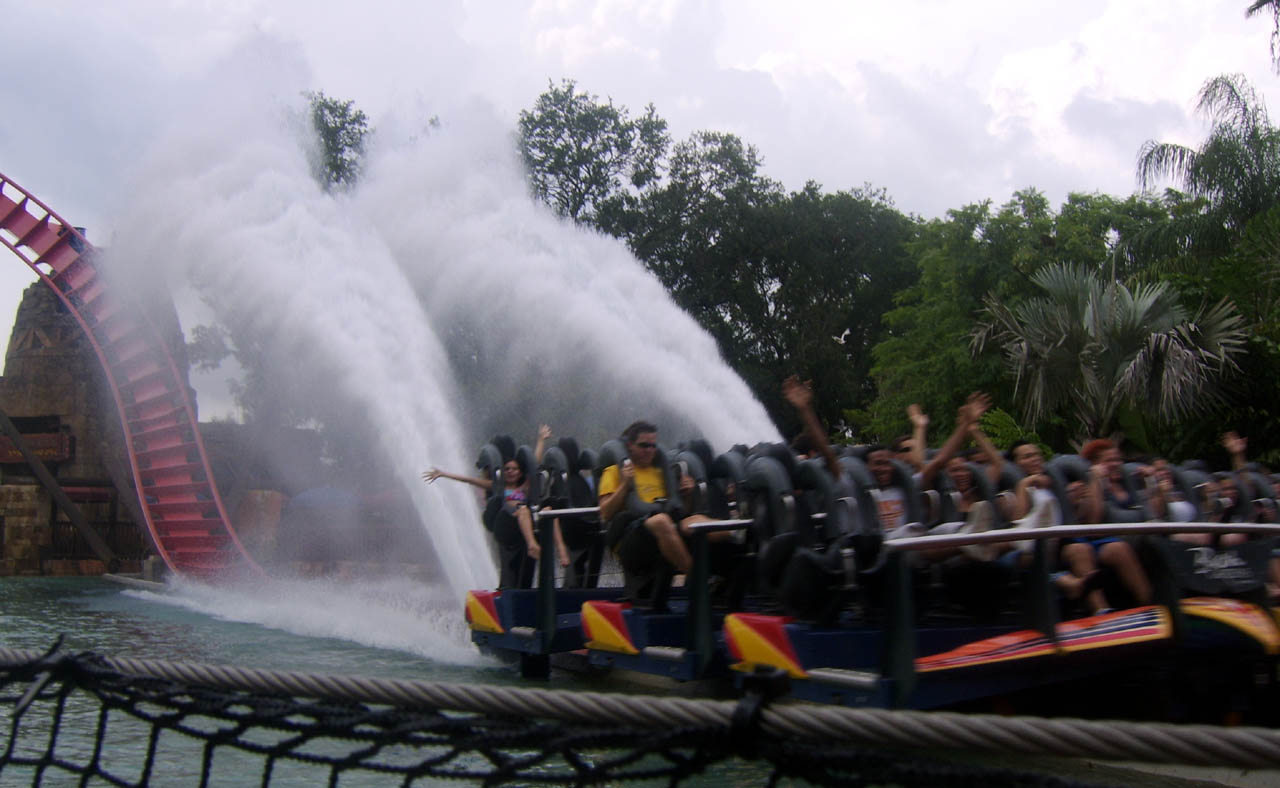
SheiKra's splashdown element

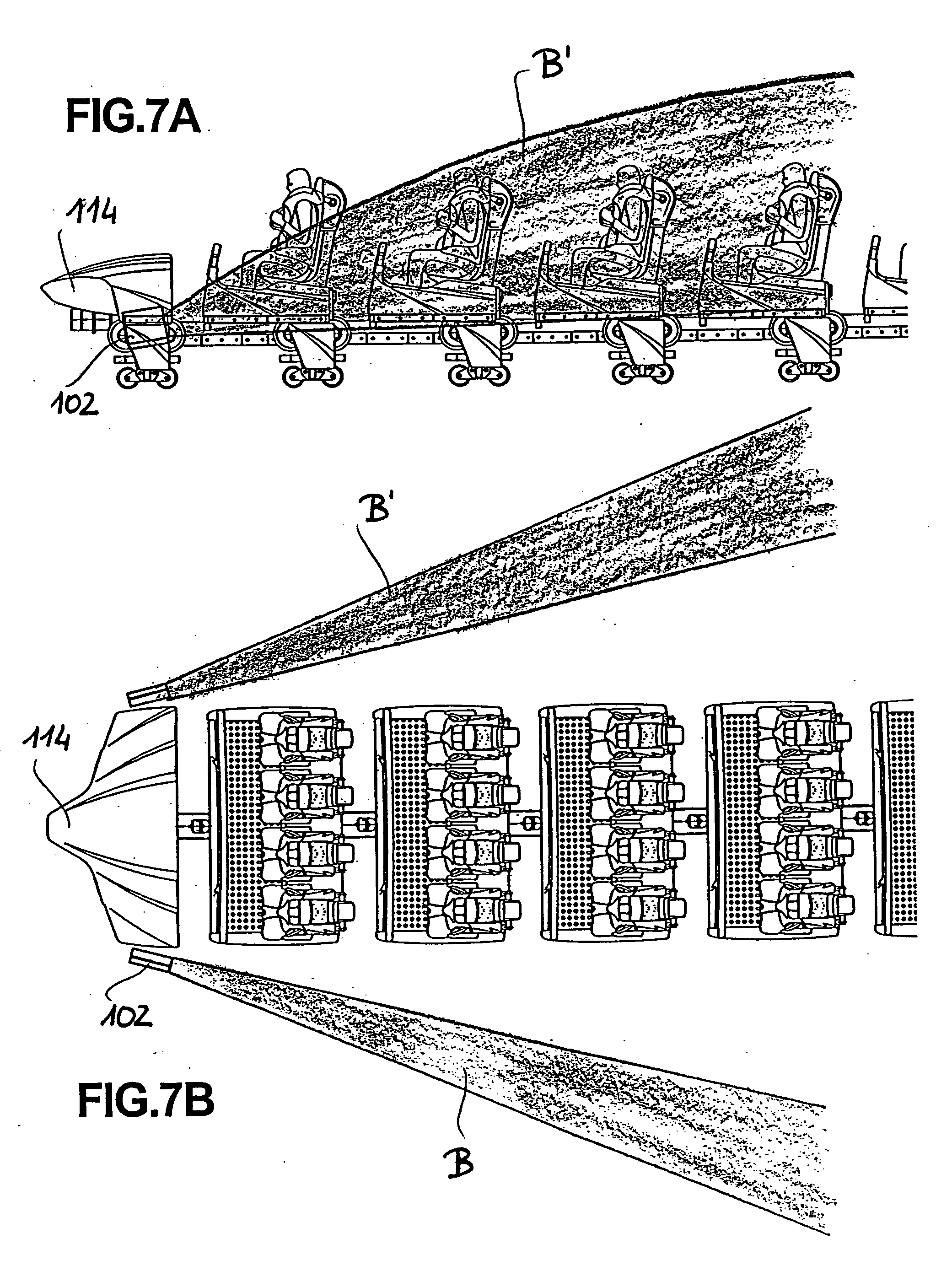
An illustration of B&M's water brakes

Water brakes were first introduced on SheiKra at Busch Gardens Tampa Bay in 2005. Water brakes can only be used when a splashdown element, in which a body of water surrounds a section of track, is present within the layout of the roller coaster. When scoops on the last car of each train come in contact with the surrounding water, the train slows down and the water is sprayed several feet into the air behind it.

== Roller coaster models ==
According to the Roller Coaster DataBase, B&M has built 11 different roller coaster models, with their dive coaster model having slight train variations on some coasters. Below is a list of B&M's distinct coaster models.

Model	Debut
Sit-Down	1993
Hyper	1999
Stand-Up	1990
Dive	1998
Family	2024
Family Inverted	2014
Floorless	1999
Flying	2002
Giga	2012
Inverted	1992
Surf	2023
Wing	2011

== Notable roller coasters ==
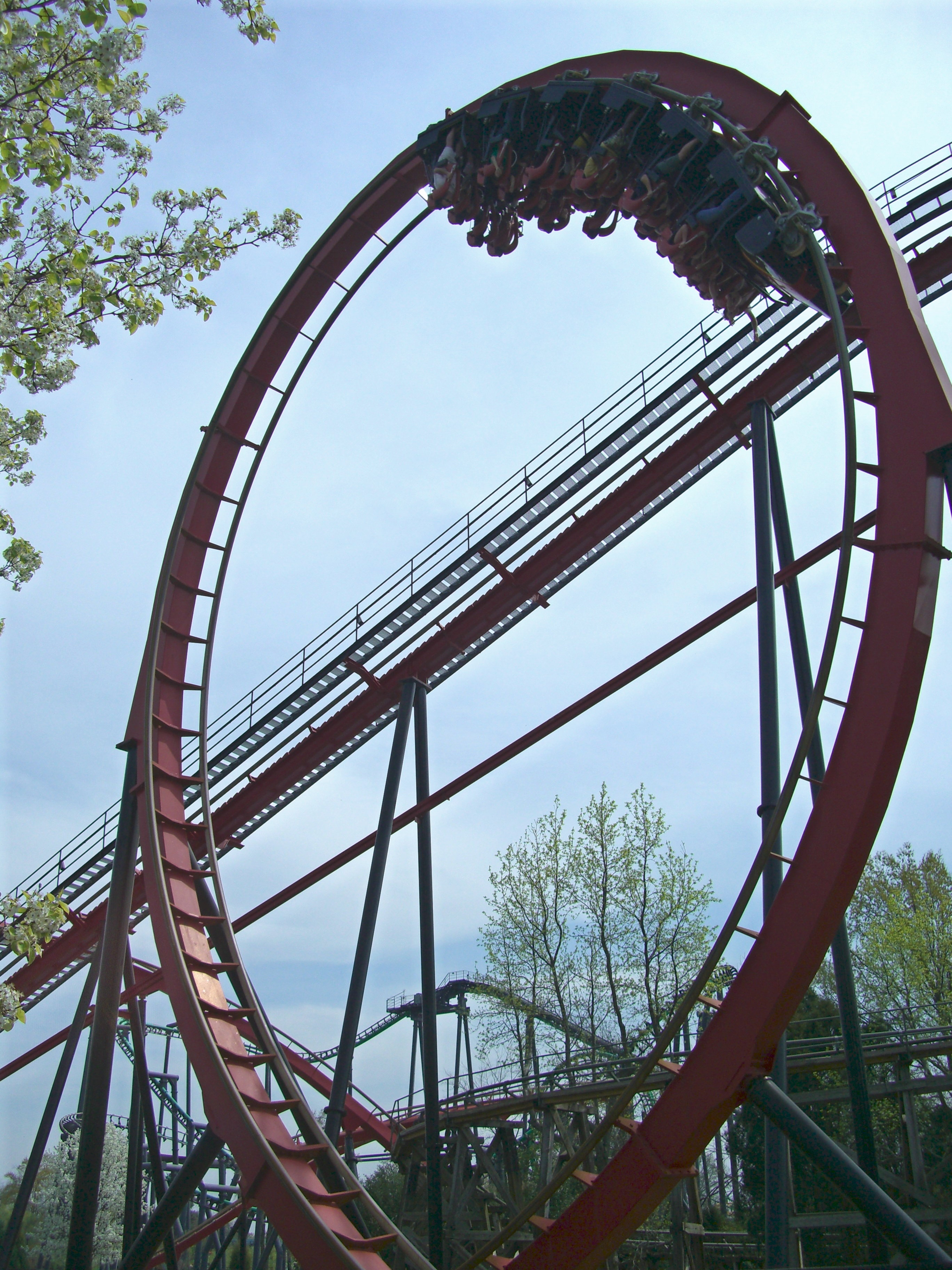
Vortex at Carowinds, a Stand-up Coaster model

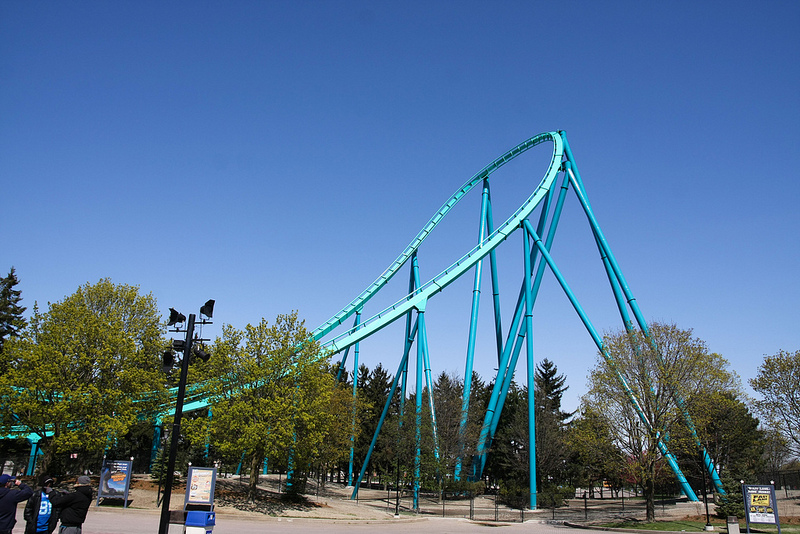
Leviathan at Canada's Wonderland, a Giga Coaster model

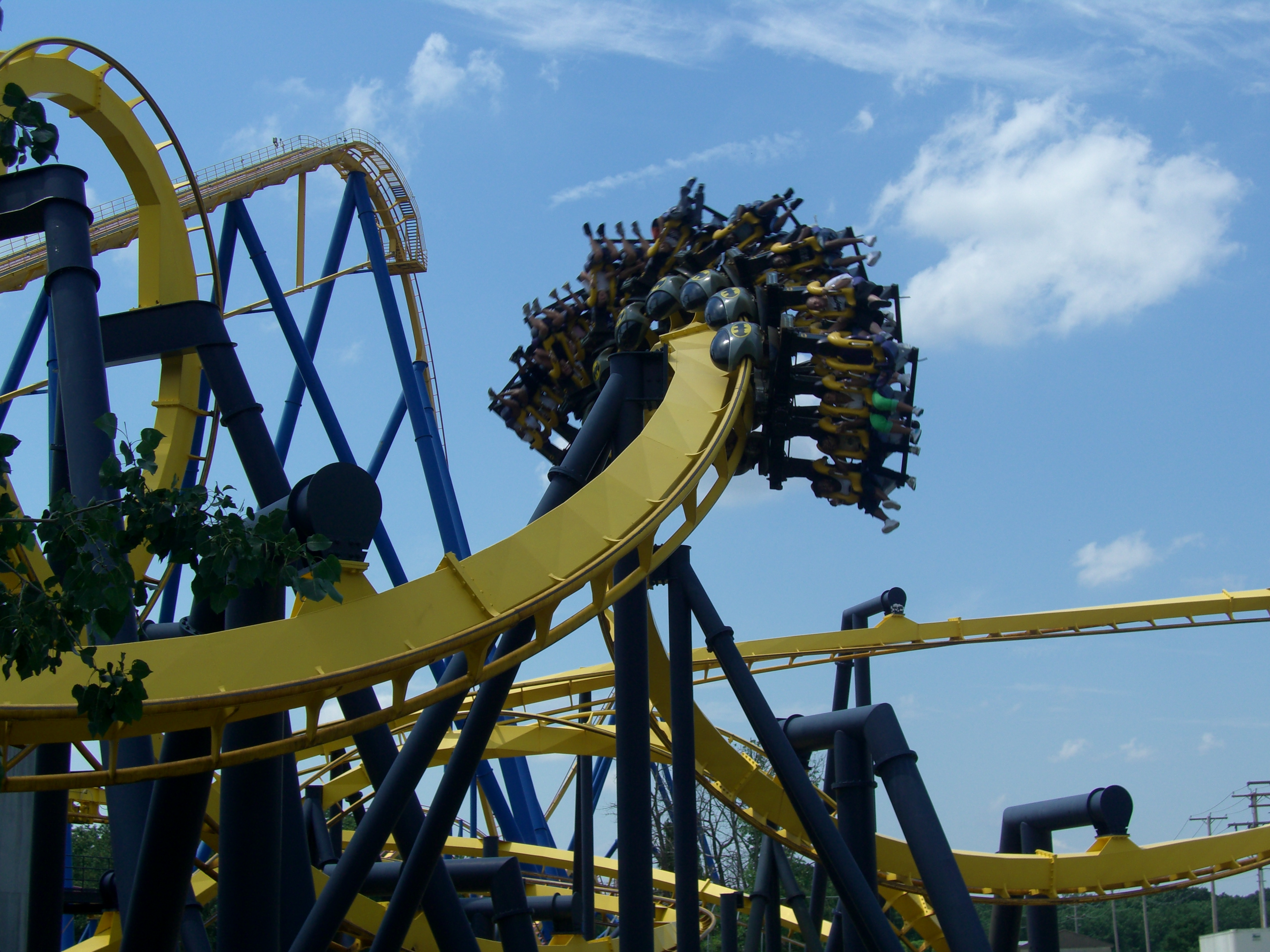
Batman: The Ride at Six Flags Great Adventure, an Inverted Coaster model

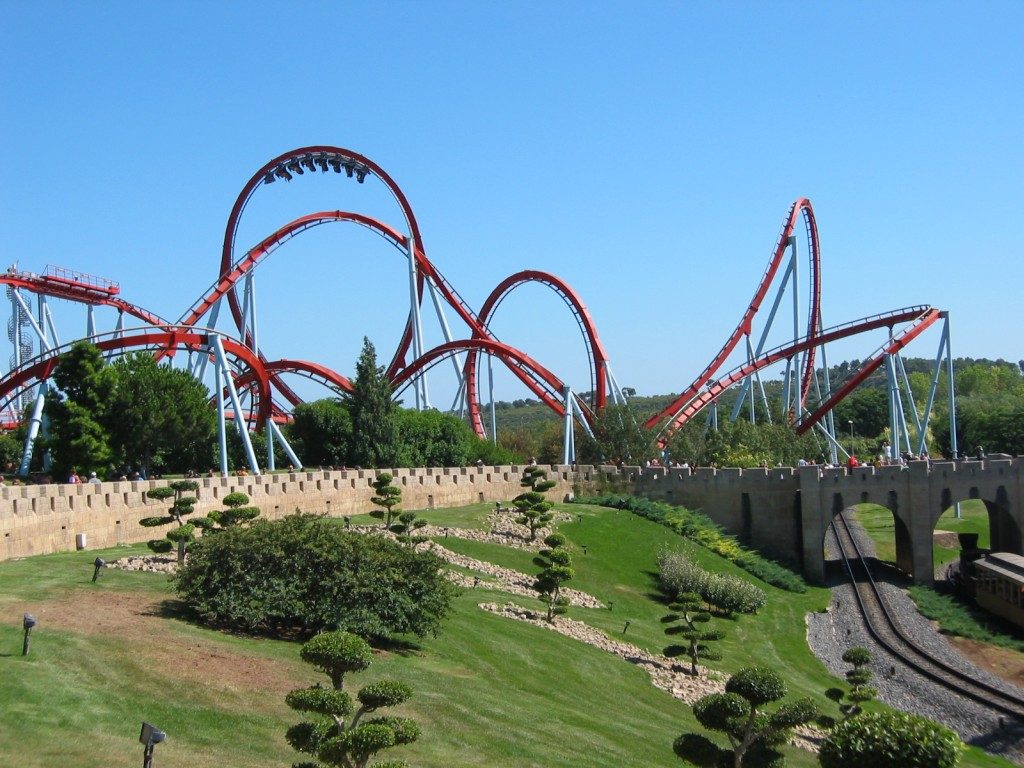
Dragon Khan at PortAventura Park, a Sitting Coaster model

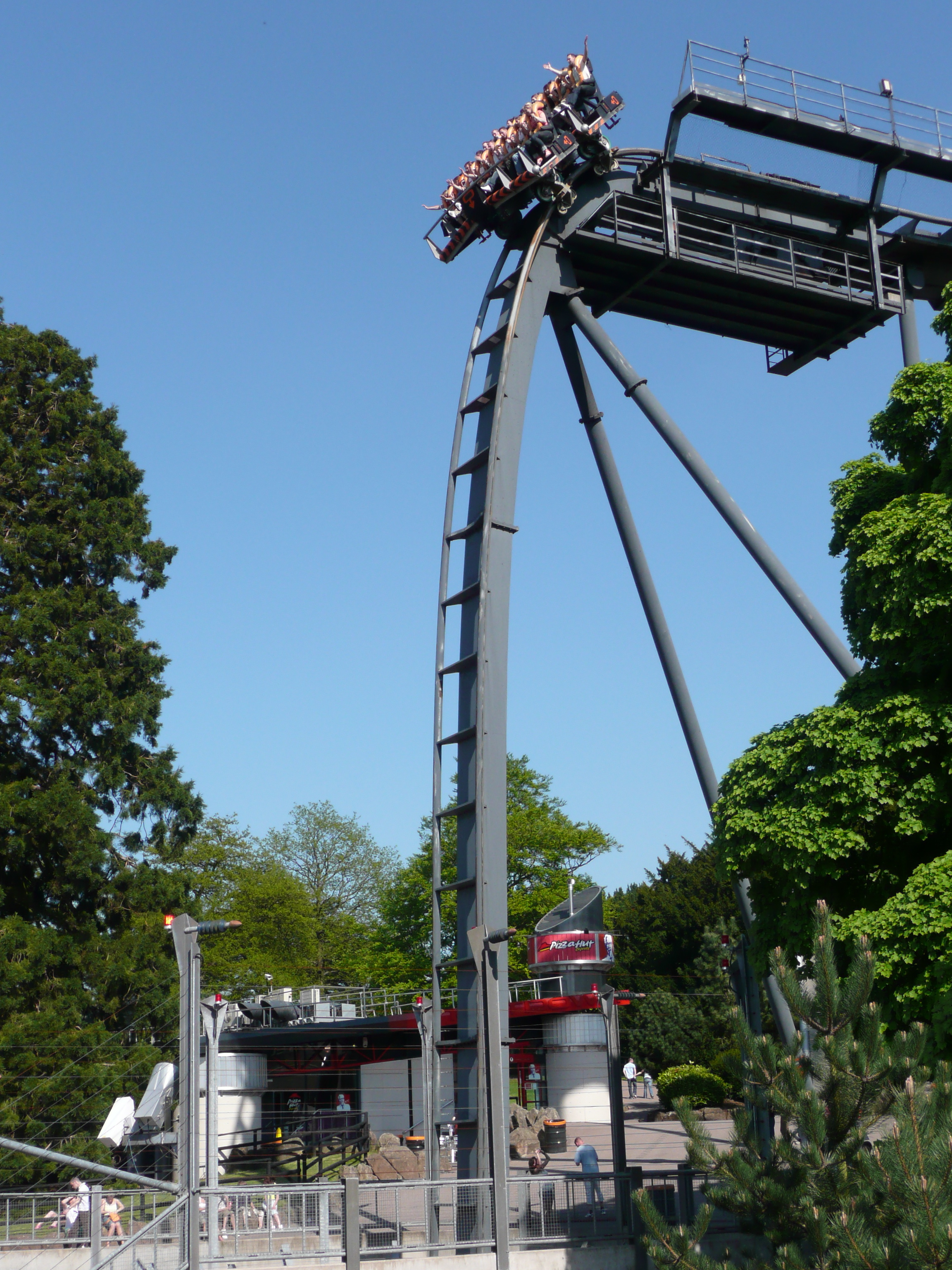
Oblivion at Alton Towers, the first Dive Coaster model

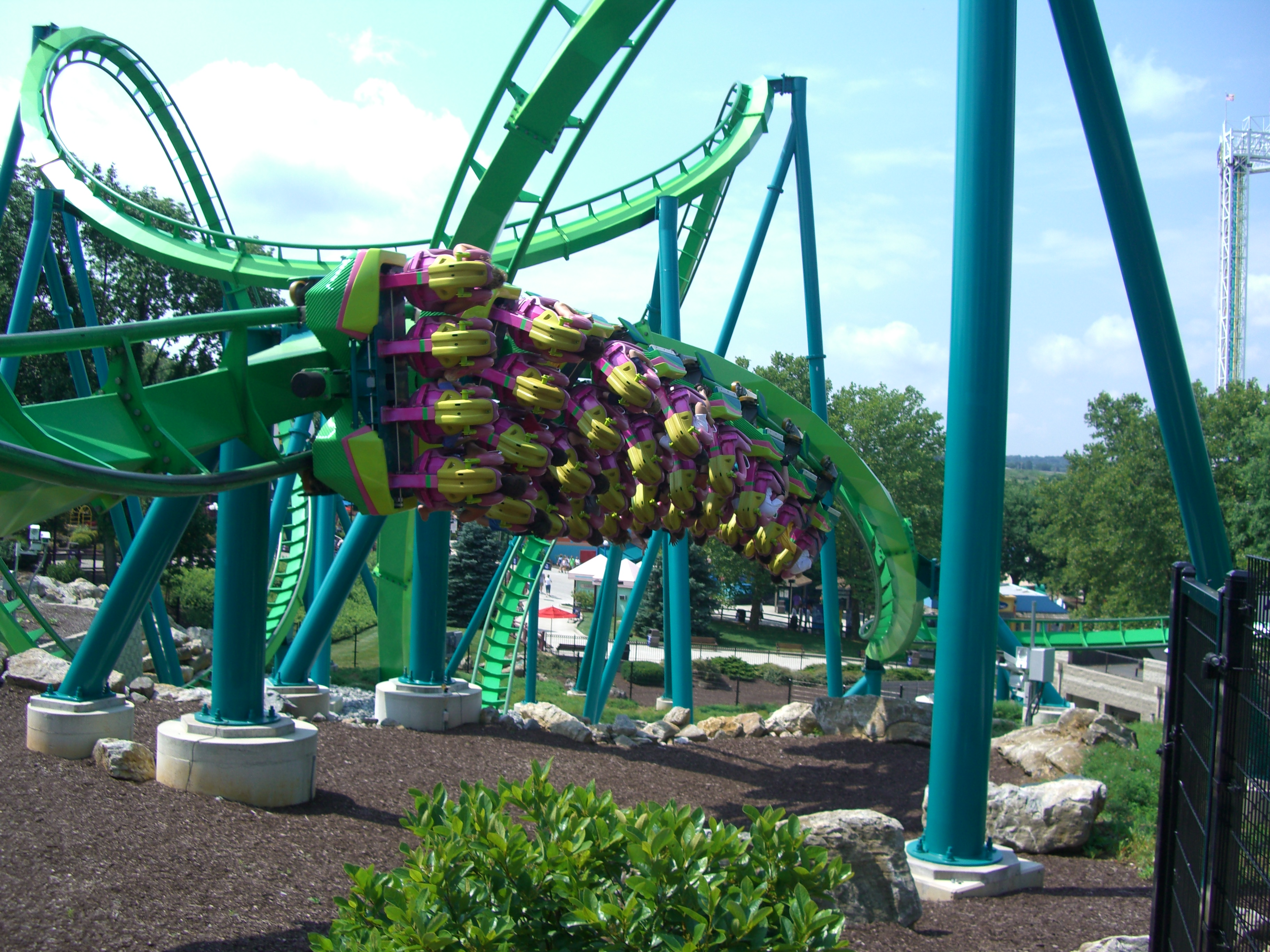
Hydra the Revenge at Dorney Park & Wildwater Kingdom, a Floorless Coaster model

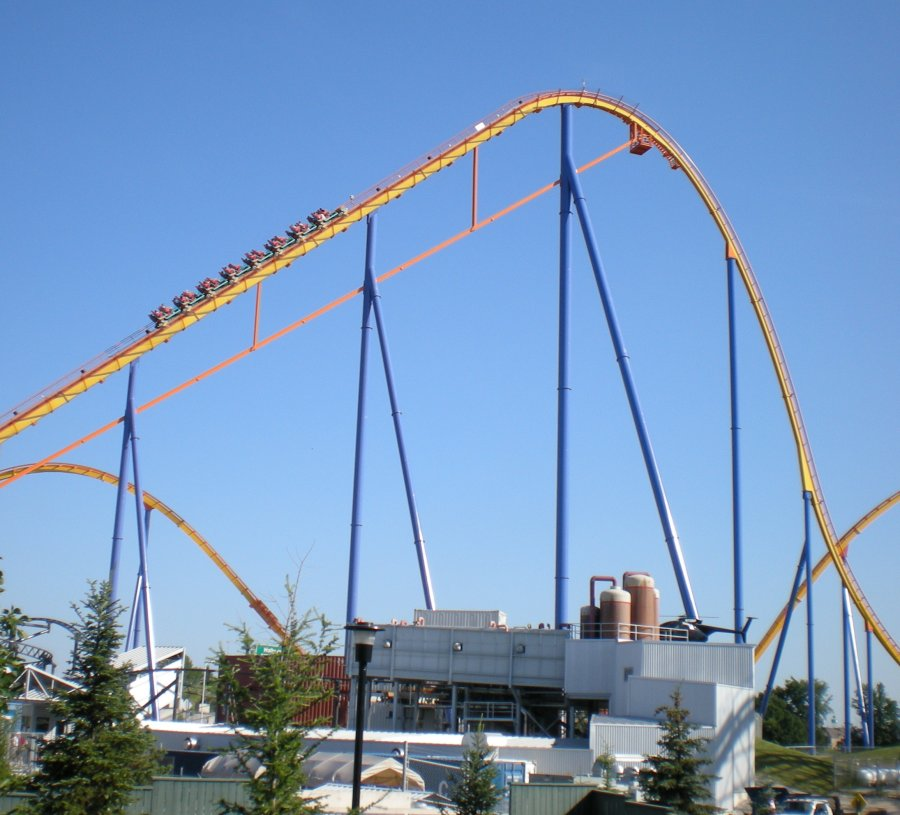
Behemoth at Canada's Wonderland, a Hyper Coaster model

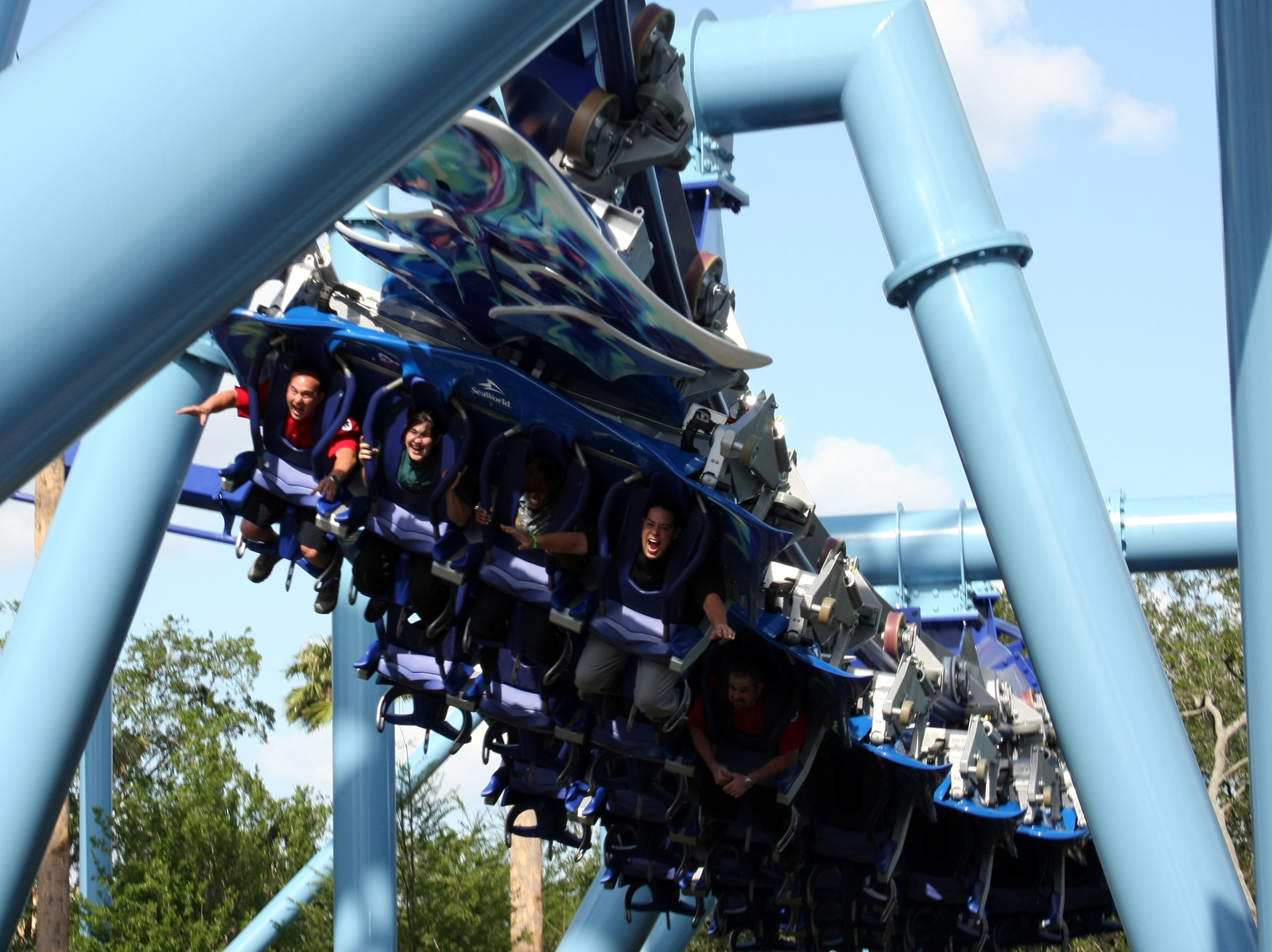
Manta at SeaWorld Orlando, a Flying Coaster model

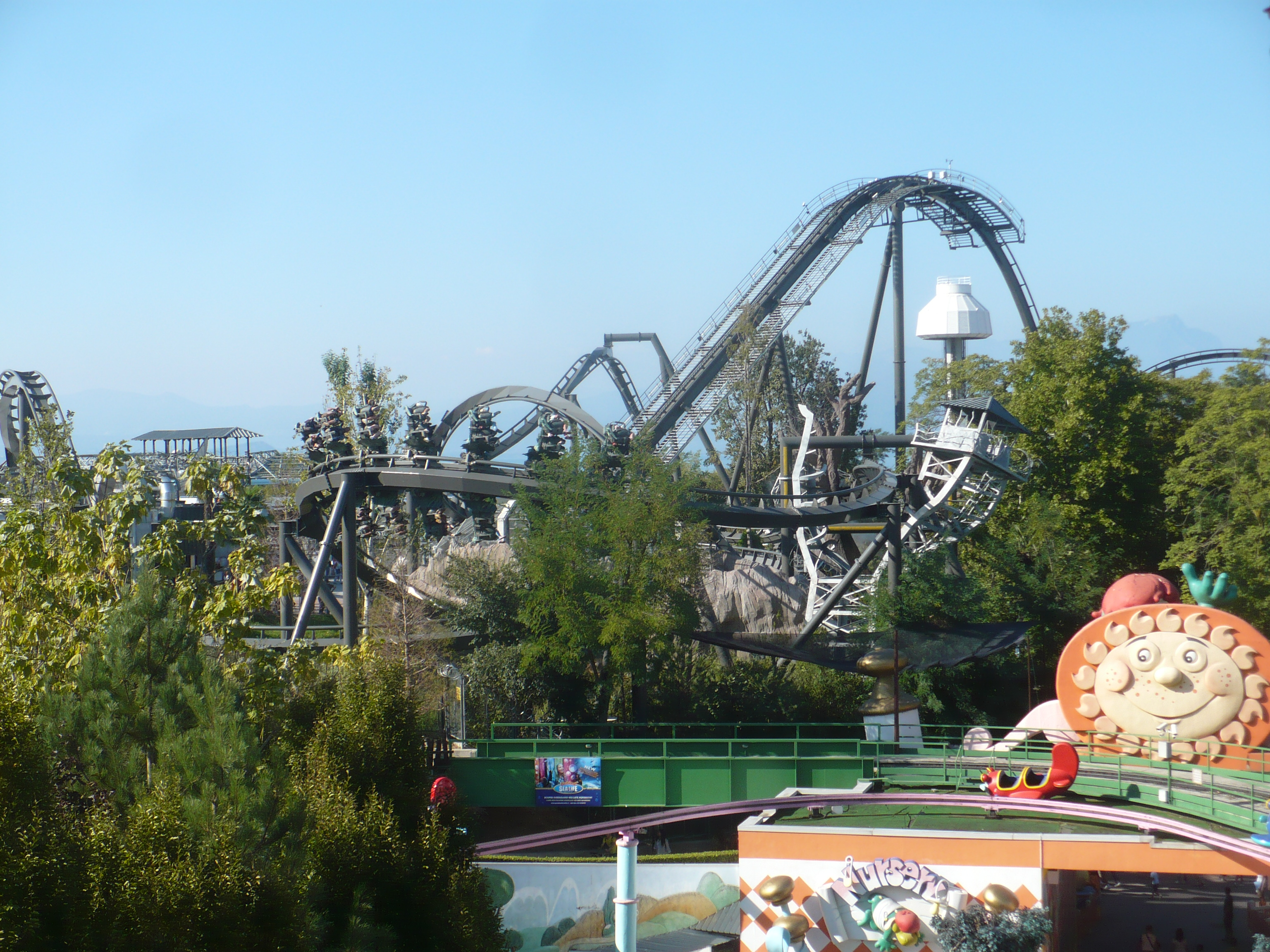
Raptor at Gardaland, the first Wing Coaster model

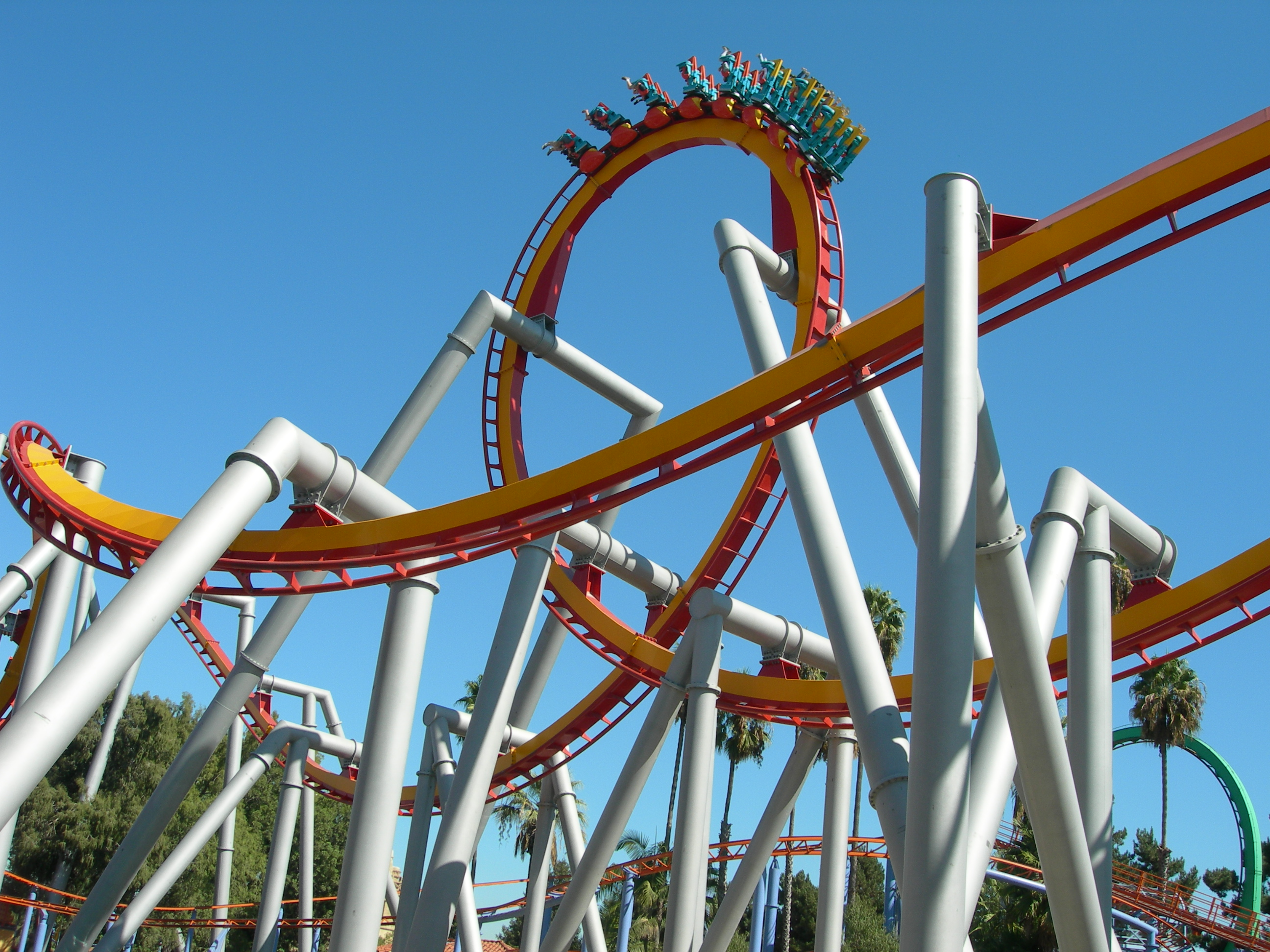
Silver Bullet at Knott's Berry Farm, an Inverted Coaster model

According to the Roller Coaster DataBase, Bolliger & Mabillard has built 136 roller coasters since its founding in 1988, beginning with Iron Wolf, which opened at Six Flags Great America in 1990. Some have either been relocated, renamed or closed. In North America, B&M coaster designs are manufactured by Ohio company Clermont Steel Fabricators.

Name	Model	Park	Country	Opened	Status	Notes	Ref.
Iron Wolf; Renamed Apocalypse; Renamed Firebird	Stand-Up Coaster Later Floorless Coaster	Six Flags Great America; Six Flags America	United States	1990 to 2011; 2012 to 2018 2019 to 2025	Closed	First B&M project and first build of this model	
Batman: The Ride	Inverted Coaster	Six Flags Great America	United States	1992	Operating	First build of this model	
Kumba	Sitting Coaster	Busch Gardens Tampa	United States	1993	Closed	First build of this model	
Dragon Khan	Sitting Coaster	PortAventura Park	Spain	1995	Operating	Record for most inversions (8) at opening	
Montu	Inverted Coaster	Busch Gardens Tampa Bay	United States	1996	Operating	One of the tallest and fastest inverted coasters at opening	
Alpengeist	Inverted Coaster	Busch Gardens Williamsburg	United States	1997	Operating	Tallest of its class	
Oblivion	Dive Coaster	Alton Towers	United Kingdom	1998	Operating	First build of this model	
The Riddler's Revenge	Stand-Up Coaster	Six Flags Magic Mountain	United States	1998	Operating	Largest and fastest of its class	
Medusa; Formerly Bizarro	Floorless Coaster	Six Flags Great Adventure	United States	1999	Operating	First build of this model	
Incredible Hulk	Sitting Coaster	Universal Islands of Adventure	United States	1999	Operating	First launched B&M attraction	
Dragon Challenge; Formerly Dueling Dragons	Inverted Coaster	Universal Islands of Adventure	United States	1999	Removed	First B&M project to be demolished	
Apollo's Chariot	Hyper Coaster	Busch Gardens Williamsburg	United States	1999	Operating	First build of this model, B&M coaster with over 200 foot tall drop	
Raging Bull	Hyper Coaster	Six Flags Great America	United States	1999	Operating	First hyper-twister, B&M coaster over 200 feet tall	
Galactica; Formerly Air	Flying Coaster	Alton Towers	United Kingdom	2002	Operating	First build of this model	
Silver Bullet	Inverted Coaster	Knott's Berry Farm	United States	2004	Operating	First Inverted Coaster to have magnetic brakes on its brake run and an over-banked curve	
Dominator; Formerly Batman: Knight Flight	Floorless Coaster	Kings Dominion; Geauga Lake	United States	2008; 2000 to 2007	Operating	Longest of its class	
Raptor	Wing Coaster	Gardaland	Italy	2011	Operating	First build of this model	
Leviathan	Giga Coaster	Canada's Wonderland	Canada	2012	Operating	First B&M roller coaster to be classified as a "gigacoaster"	
Rougarou; Formerly Mantis	Floorless Coaster; Formerly Stand-Up Coaster	Cedar Point	United States	2015; 1996 to 2014	Operating	First instance of B&M changing train type	
Fury 325	Giga Coaster	Carowinds	United States	2015	Operating	World's tallest non-launched roller coaster	
Pipeline: The Surf Coaster	Surf Coaster (Stand Up)	SeaWorld Orlando	United States	2023	Operating	First launched stand-up roller coaster	
Tormenta Rampaging Run	Dive Coaster	Six Flags Over Texas	United States	2026	Operating	Tallest of its class	

== Safety ==
B&M has maintained a good safety record for its rides, and between its foundation and 2026 had never been found liable for any deaths associated with its coasters.

There have been a number of deaths associated with people making unauthorised access to active ride areas and being struck by trains, including on Batman: The Ride at Six Flags Over Georgia, Raptor at Cedar Point, and Banshee at Kings Island.

On October 12 2026, a 42 year old man was ejected from his seat on the Goliath ride at Six Flags Over Georgia, and later pronounced dead at hospital. Nine other B&M roller coasters with the same 'clamshell' restraint across six other parks were closed pending safety review. This was the second death on this rollercoaster, after the 2006 death of a 45 year old man on the ride from a congential heart problem.
