= Silver Bullet (Knott's Berry Farm) =

Roller coaster at Knott's Berry Farm

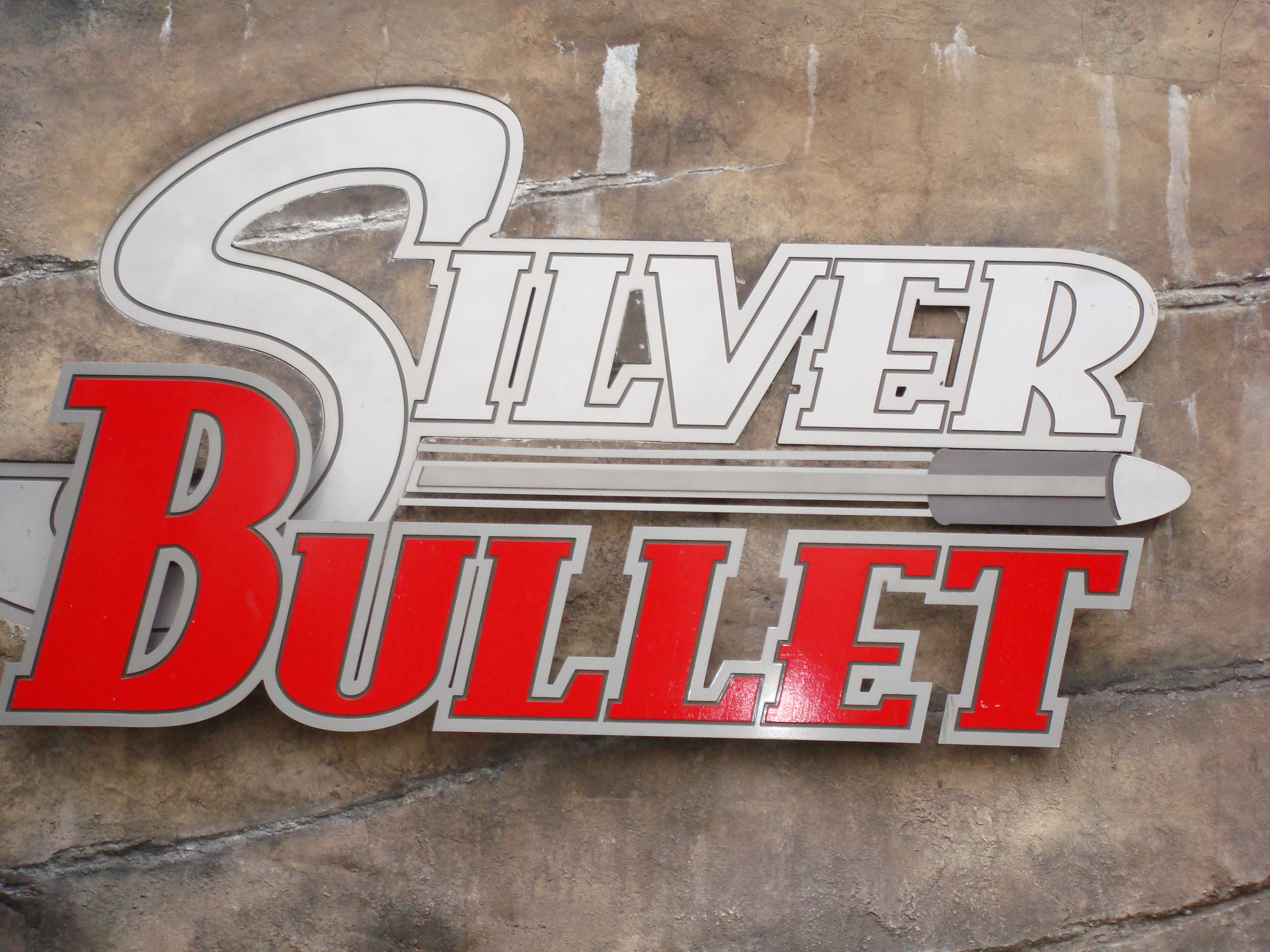

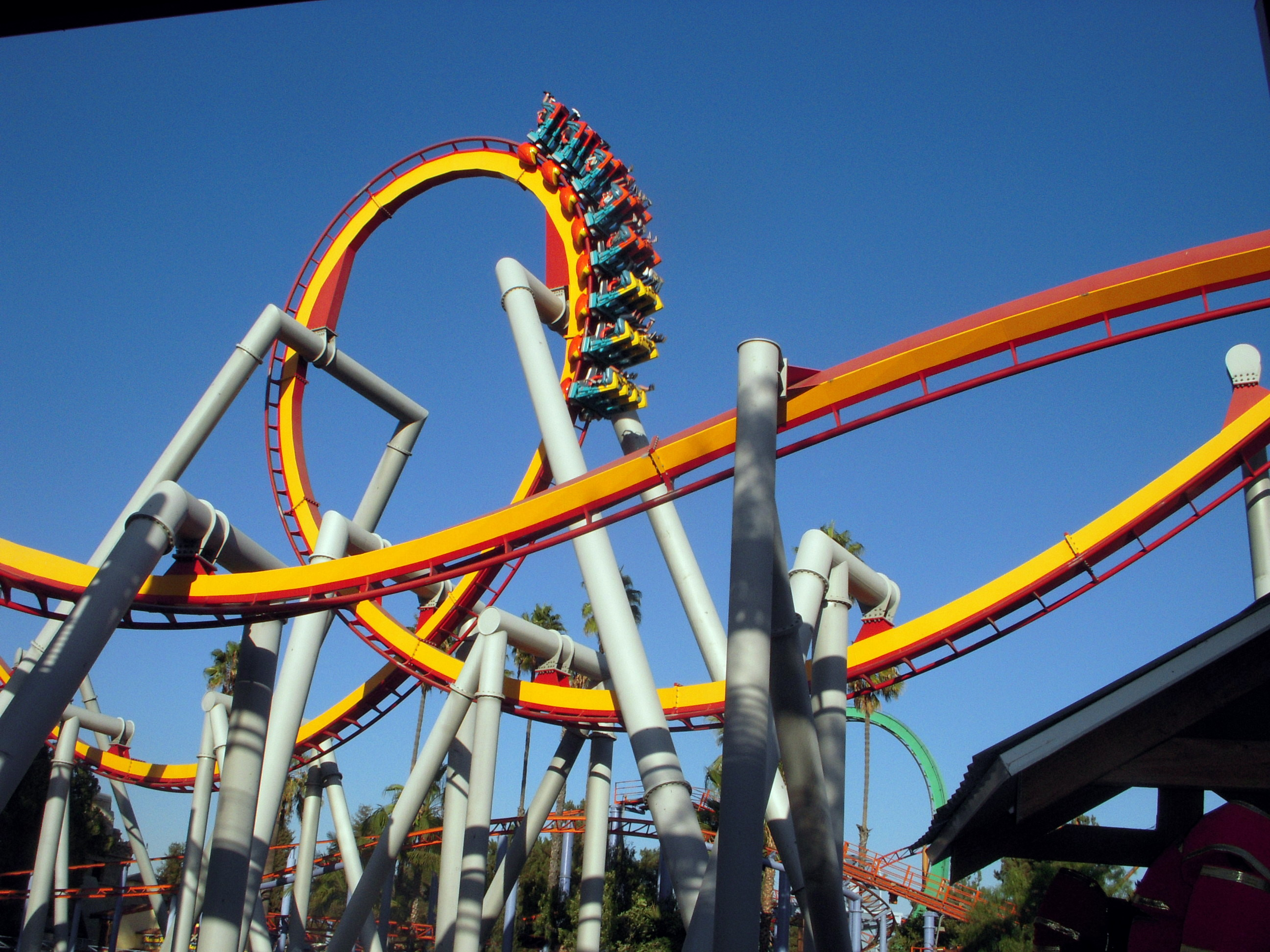
- The 105-foot vertical loop on Silver Bullet, its first inversion, is placed over water.

Knott's Berry Farm
- Location: Knott's Berry Farm
- Park section: Ghost Town
- Coordinates: 33°50′40″N 117°59′59″W
- Status: Operating
- Opening date: December 7, 2004
- Cost: US$16,000,000

General statistics
- Type: Steel – Inverted
- Manufacturer: Bolliger & Mabillard
- Model: Inverted Coaster
- Lift/launch system: Chain lift
- Height: 146 ft (45 m)
- Drop: 109 ft (33 m)
- Length: 3,125 ft (952 m)
- Speed: 55 mph (89 km/h)
- Inversions: 6
- Duration: 2:30
- Max vertical angle: 40°
- Capacity: 1300 riders per hour
- G-force: 3
- Height restriction: 54 in (137 cm)
- Trains: 3 (max. 2 in operation) trains with 8 cars; riders arranged 4 across in a single row for a total of 32 riders per train
- Fast Lane available
- Silver Bullet at RCDB

Silver Bullet is a western-theme inverted roller coaster designed by Bolliger & Mabillard located at Knott's Berry Farm, an amusement park in Buena Park, California. The $16 million roller coaster was announced on December 1, 2003 and opened on December 7, 2004. The track is approximately 3,125 feet (952 m) long and the lift hill is about 146 feet (45 m) tall. The ride lasts two minutes and thirty seconds and features six inversions including a vertical loop, cobra roll, zero-g roll, and two corkscrews.

== History ==
On May 28, 2003, a trademark for the name "Silver Bullet" was filed by Cedar Fair, the previous owners of Knott's Berry Farm. Construction for the new roller coaster began in September 2003 with the relocation of The Church of Reflections. As part of an $85 million investment in all Cedar Fair parks, Silver Bullet was announced to the public on December 1, 2003. The final piece of track was installed on September 30, 2004. On November 5, 2004, Knott's Berry Farm launched a "First Rider Auction" in which people from anywhere in the world would bid against each other in order to be one of the first public riders on Silver Bullet on December 7, 2004. Although sixty seats were made available, only 13 of these received bids. Out of those bids, the highest bid was $200 (US), and a total of $1643 was raised with all the money going to the Speech & Language Development Center of Buena Park. After construction and testing was completed, the roller coaster opened first to the media, then to the public on December 7, 2004 though the initial scheduled opening was on Christmas Eve of 2004. Silver Bullet was also one of four attractions that opened at Knott's Berry Farm in the same year and carries a western theme.

== Ride experience ==
The ride entrance is located in the Ghost Town section of Knott's Berry Farm. Silver Bullet's layout passes through three of the park's themed areas: Ghost Town, Fiesta Village, and Indian Trails.

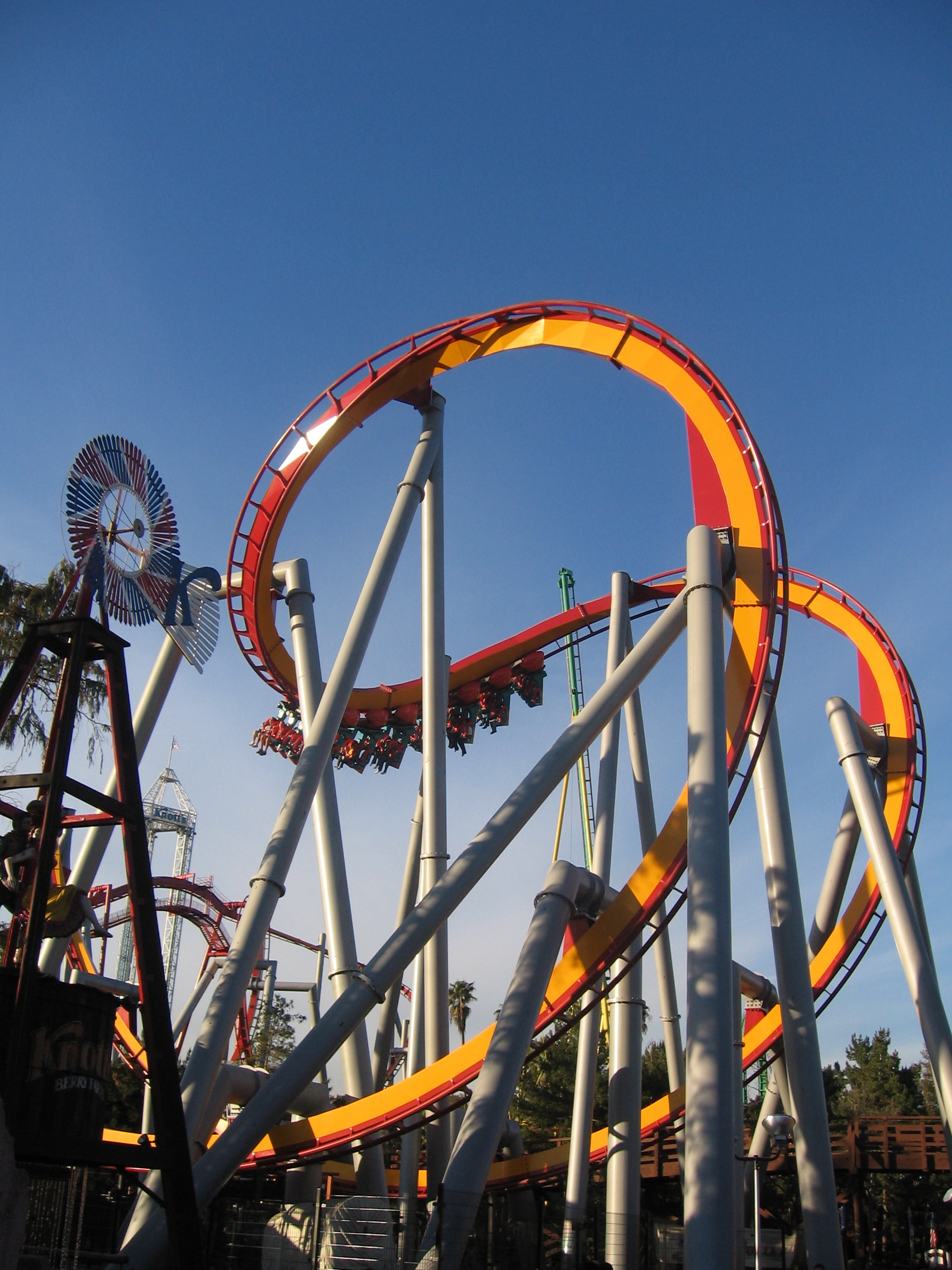
Silver Bullet's cobra roll

After the train departs from the station, it makes a 90 degree right turn before beginning to climb the 146-foot (45 m) lift hill. Once at the top, the train goes through a pre-drop before entering the 109-foot (33 m) downward right drop. Once at the bottom, the train enters a 105-foot (32 m) vertical loop. After exiting the loop, the train makes a banked left turn leading into a cobra roll. Almost immediately after, the train goes through a zero-gravity roll followed by a downward left helix. Then, the train enters the first of two corkscrews which are separated by a banked left turn. Next, the train enters an upward left helix (the beginning of the helix is close to water) before entering the brake run. The train then makes a right turn into a second, shorter, brake run which leads straight back to the station. One cycle lasts approximately two minutes and thirty seconds.

=== Track ===
The steel track of Silver Bullet is approximately 3,125 feet (952 m) long, and the height of the lift is approximately 146 feet (45 m) high. Silver Bullet, along with all of Bolliger & Mabillard's other roller coasters, was manufactured by Clermont Steel Fabricators of Batavia, Ohio, and erected by Coan Construction Company. The track is filled with sand to reduce the noise made by the trains. Silver Bullet was also the first Bolliger & Mabillard inverted roller coaster to use magnetic brakes in the brake run. The track and supports of the second brake run to the lift hill are all red. The remaining track is yellow with red rails and the remaining supports are colored white.

=== Trains ===
Silver Bullet operates with two steel and fiberglass trains, with a third kept in reserve for maintenance. Each train has eight cars that can seat four riders in a single row, for a total of 32 riders per train. The seats are colored light blue, with orange over-the-shoulder restraints and tri-color wheel coverings (red, orange, and yellow).

== Reception ==
Joel Taylor from Amusement Business praised the ride saying, "In all, it's an exhilarating 2 1/2 minutes from start to finish." He was also impressed with the ride's smoothness and overall excitement, stating that the ride is, "smooth and comfortable while delivering twisting, stomach-churning excitement."

=== Awards ===
Since Silver Bullet's debut in 2004, it has consistently been ranked in the top 140 positions in Mitch Hawker's Best Roller Steel Coaster Poll. It peaked at position 99 in 2010. The roller coaster has never placed on the Golden Ticket Awards.

Mitch Hawker's Best Roller Coaster Poll: Best Steel-Tracked Roller Coaster
Year	2005	2006	2007	2008	2009	2010	2011	2012
Ranking	120	110	129	126	109	99	^{^1}	136

1. No Steel Roller Coaster Poll was held in 2011.
