= Thunder Striker =

Steel roller coaster at Carowinds

- Previously known as Intimidator (2010-2023)
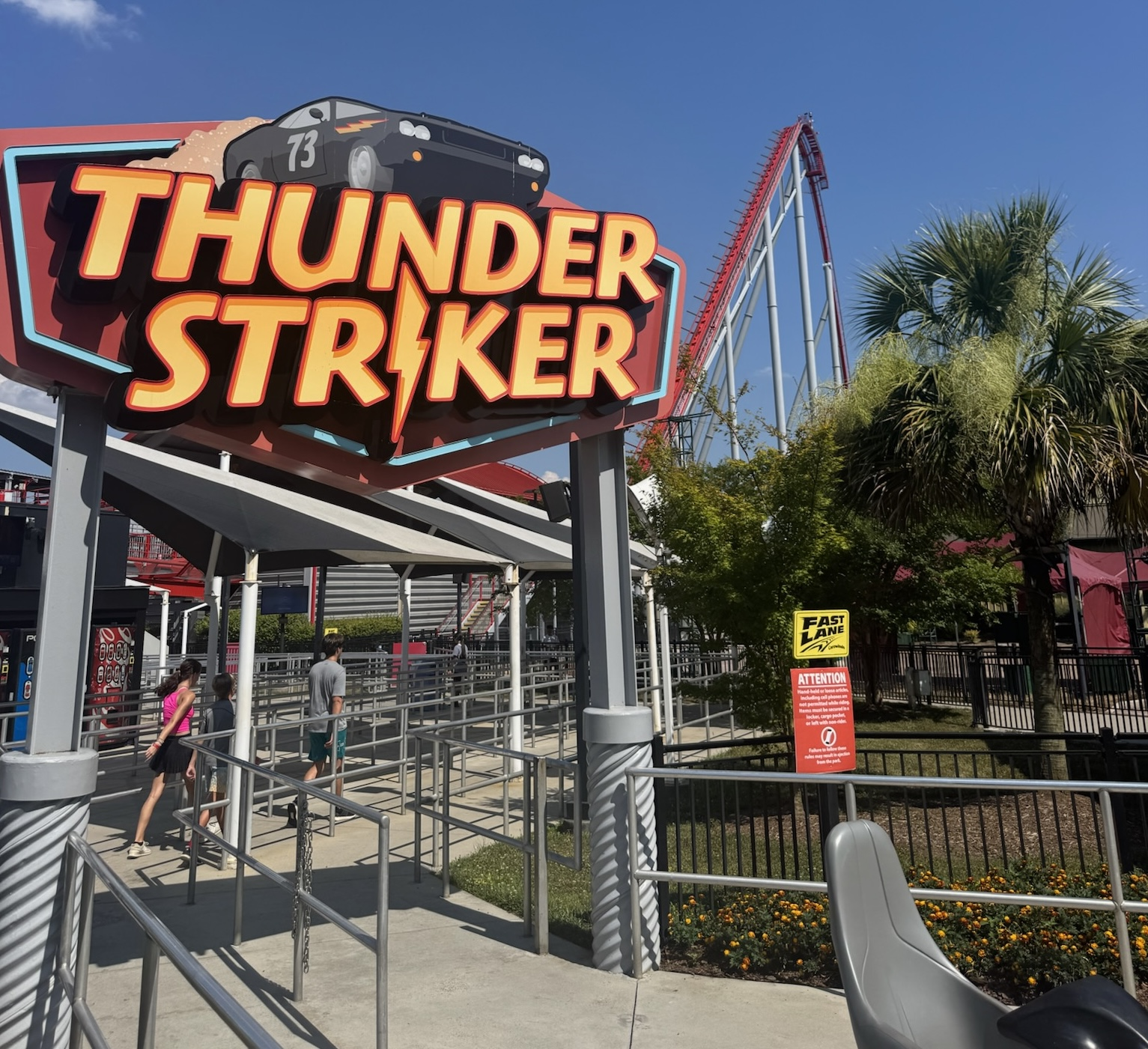
- Lift hill and entrance for Thunder Striker

Carowinds
- Location: Carowinds
- Park section: Thunder Road
- Coordinates: 35°06′11″N 80°56′22″W
- Status: Operating
- Opening date: March 27, 2010
- Cost: $23 million

General statistics
- Type: Steel
- Manufacturer: Bolliger & Mabillard
- Model: Hyper Coaster
- Track layout: Out and back
- Lift/launch system: Lift hill
- Height: 232 ft (71 m)
- Drop: 211 ft (64 m)
- Length: 5,316 ft (1,620 m)
- Speed: 80 mph (130 km/h)
- Inversions: 0
- Duration: 3:33
- Max vertical angle: 74°
- Capacity: 1600 riders per hour
- G-force: 4.3
- Height restriction: 54 in (137 cm)
- Trains: 3 trains with 8 cars; riders arranged 4 across in a single row for a total of 32 riders per train
- Fast Lane available
- Thunder Striker at RCDB

Thunder Striker, formerly known as Intimidator, is a hypercoaster located at Carowinds in Charlotte, North Carolina, United States. Built by Bolliger & Mabillard and located in the Thunder Road section of the park, the ride opened to public on March 27, 2010. It features a 232-foot (71 m) lift hill, a top speed of 75 mph (121 km/h), and a track length of 5,316 feet (1,620 m).

The roller coaster was originally named after NASCAR driver Dale Earnhardt, who was nicknamed "the Intimidator." Following the expiring of a license agreement with Earnhardt's estate in December 2023, Cedar Fair renamed the coaster Thunder Striker for the 2024 season.

== History ==
Construction on Intimidator began during the summer of 2009 with land clearing and footings being constructed. Track pieces first began to arrive at Carowinds on August 7, 2009. About three weeks later, on August 26, 2009, Carowinds officially announced Intimidator. Along with the announcement, Carowinds reached a licensing agreement with Dale Earnhardt, Inc. to use the late NASCAR racing legend Dale Earnhardt's brand as part of the ride. One of Earnhardt's sons, Kerry Earnhardt, was on-hand for the press conference announcing the attraction and endorsed the ride on behalf of the family.

The first supports and track for Intimidator were installed on September 1, 2009. The lift hill was erected on October 1, 2009, and was completed on October 13, 2009. In order to install the last lift piece, 3 cranes were required. Construction on the roller coaster layout continued through November and December with the final track piece installed on December 21, 2009. Construction on the station, mechanics, and landscaping of Intimidator took place during the months of January and February. On February 4, 2010, testing of Intimidator commenced. The ride ultimately cost $23 million.

On January 14, 2010, Carowinds launched a "First Rider Auction" in which people from anywhere in the world would bid to be one of Intimidator's first 96 public riders. The winners would ride the coaster on March 27, 2010, before it opened to general public; all money raised from the auction would go to the Dale Earnhardt Foundation. The highest bid for a single seat was US$500. The new roller coaster officially opened to the public on March 27, 2010. Intimidator was one of two roller coasters themed to Earnhardt that opened in 2010; the other was Pantherian (formerly Intimidator 305), a giga coaster manufactured by Intamin at Kings Dominion, another Cedar Fair park. Carowinds officials hoped that the ride would attract guests.

The licensing agreement to use the Intimidator nickname from the Earnhardt estate expired in December 2023. As a result, Intimidator was renamed Thunder Striker and the section of the park was named Thunder Road in recognition of the area's connection to stock car racing and as a tribute to the park's defunct wooden racing roller coaster.

== Ride experience ==
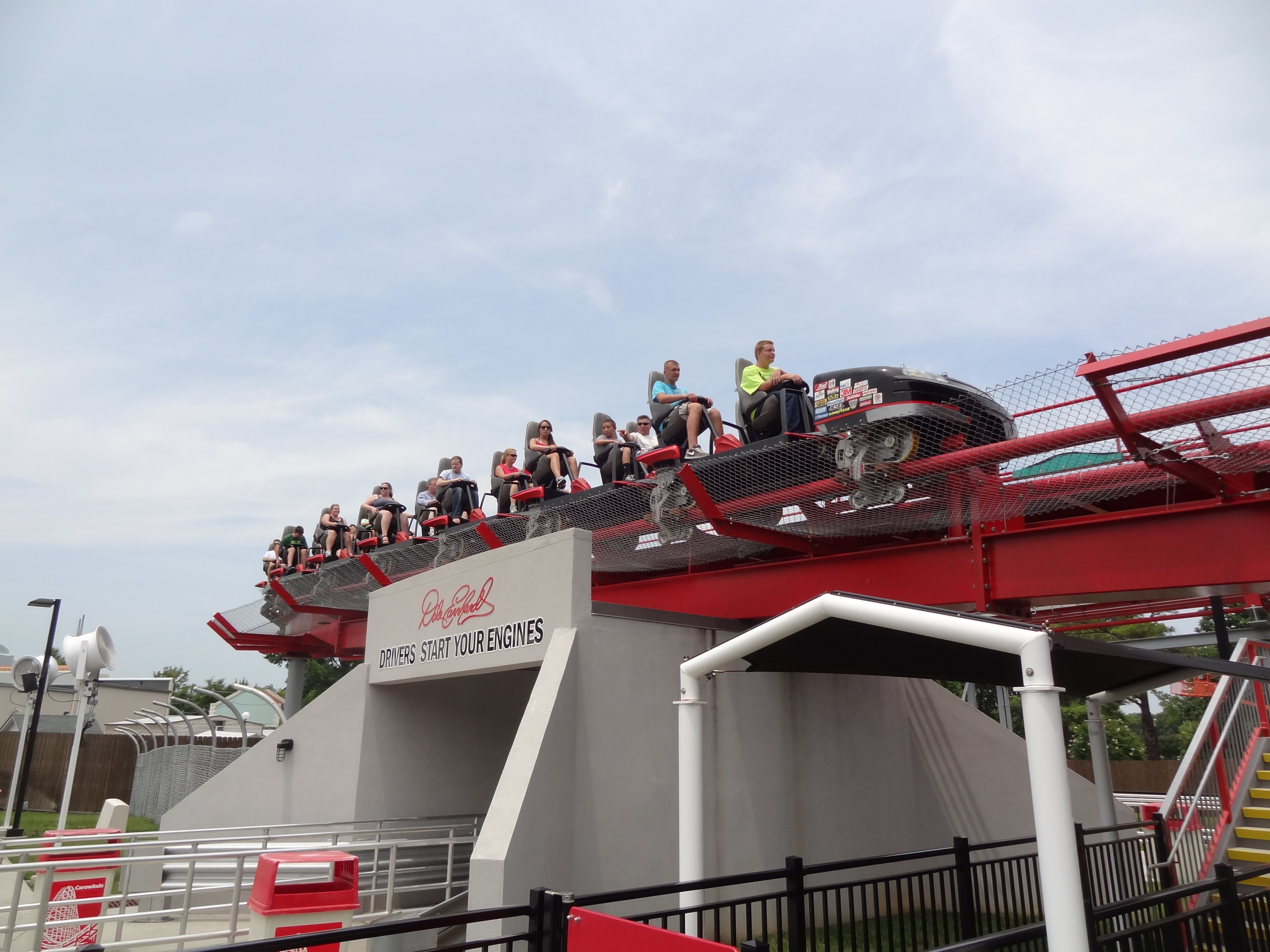
Train passing by the queue

Thunder Striker features eight drops, seven camelback hills, a panoramic U-turn, and a diving spiral. The seven camelback hills represent each of Earnhardt's championships. From the first drop to the brake run, the camelback hills respectively measure 178 feet (54 m), 151 feet (46 m), 105 feet (32 m), 90 feet (27 m), 62 feet (19 m), 52 feet (16 m), and 48 feet (15 m) tall. One cycle lasts about 3 minutes and 33 seconds.

After departing from the station, the train heads straight to the chain lift hill. Once the train reaches the top of the 232-foot (71 m) lift, it drops 211 feet (64 m) at a 74-degree angle reaching speeds of up to 75 mph (121 km/h). Following the first drop, the train then goes over the first camelback hill before making a sharp right hand turn back to the ground followed by a left hand turn. After the turn, the train goes over the second camelback hill. Following the hill, the train enters a 121-foot (37 m) hammerhead turn. The train then goes over a third camelback hill, immediately followed by another camelback hill. Next, the train makes a left hand turn into the mid-course brake run which slows the train down. After the train exits the brake run, it goes over the fifth camelback and makes a sharp right hand turn into an element known as a Diving Spiral. The train goes through two more camelback hills, then enters the final brake run which turns 180° over a path which then leads into the station.

== Characteristics ==
=== Trains ===
Thunder Striker operates with three open-air stadium style steel and fiberglass trains. Each train has eight cars that have four seats each for a total of 32 riders per train. Additionally, the trains were originally themed after Dale Earnhardt’s 1998 RCR No. 3 Chevrolet Monte Carlo. The train bodies are colored red and black, with gray seats. The trains' restraint system consists of Bolliger & Mabillard’s Clamshell-style lap bars.

=== Track ===
The steel track is painted red, while the supports are gray. The steel track is 5,316 feet (1,620 m) in length, and the height of the lift is approximately 232 feet (71 m). The angle of the first descent is approximately 74 degrees. Also, the roller coaster includes trim brakes and magnetic brakes for speed control. In 2020, the track was repainted. The tracks weigh 1.567 million pounds (711 t) and the supports weigh about 1.5 million pounds (680 t), giving the ride structure a total weight of about 3.391 million pounds (1,538 t).

=== Theme ===
Prior to the removal of the ride's Earnhardt theme, Intimidator, much like its northern cousin, Pantherian (formerly Intimidator 305), had very loose theming in the ride's entrance plaza, queue and station building, such as items of family memorabilia, a replica of Earnhardt's racecar, and signage and architecture meant to evoke the feeling of being at a speedway. Post-renovation, the ride, now named Thunder Striker, entails the story of mechanics modifying an old hot rod and it becoming the new champion of dirt road racing in the Carolinas. Riders represent guests of "Earl", the hot rod's owner, who join him in a joy ride.

== Awards ==
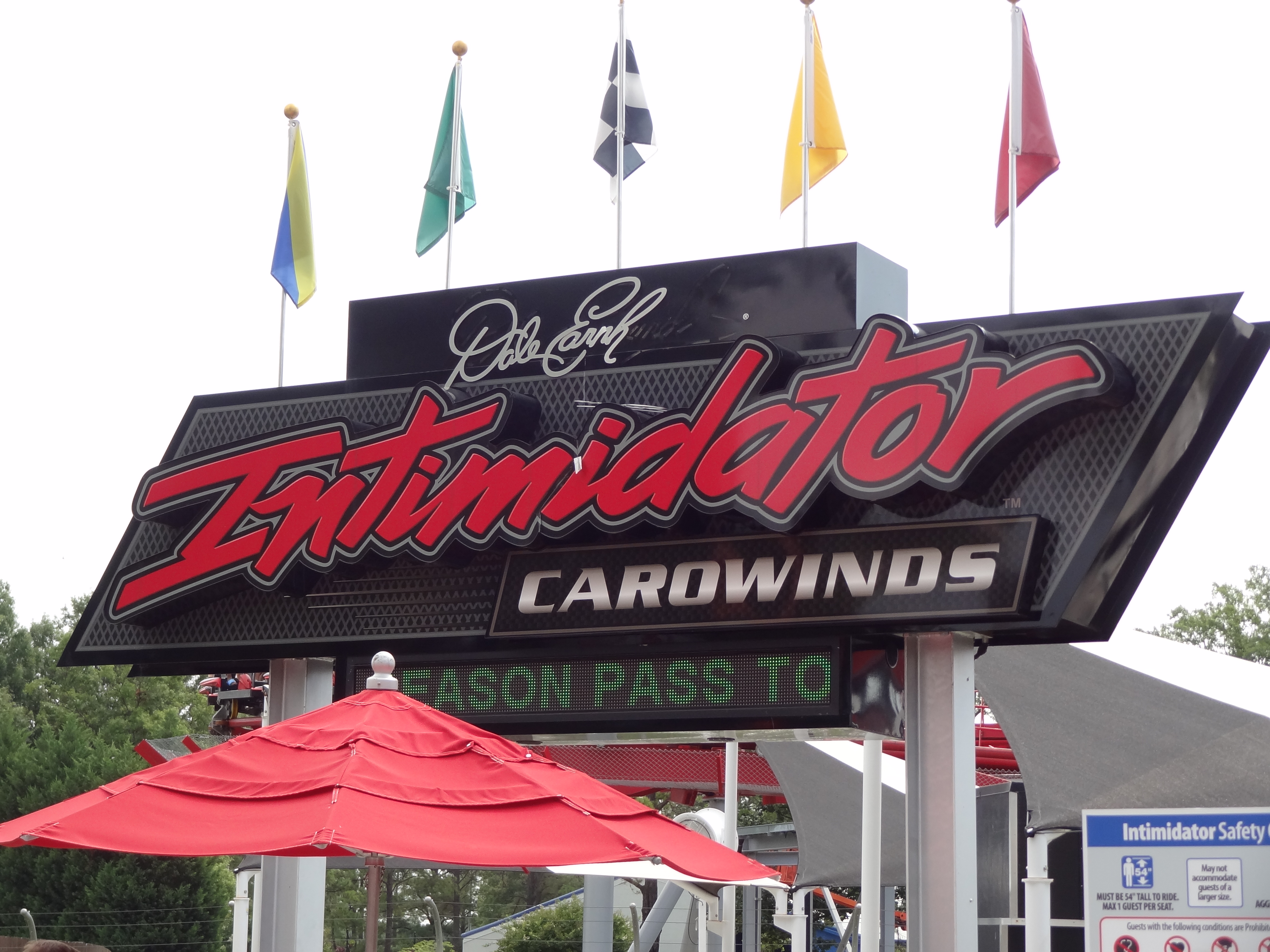
Former entrance sign prior to the 2024 season

Golden Ticket Awards: Top steel Roller Coasters
Year									1998	1999
Ranking									–	–
Year	2000	2001	2002	2003	2004	2005	2006	2007	2008	2009
Ranking	–	–	–	–	–	–	–	–	–	–
Year	2010	2011	2012	2013	2014	2015	2016	2017	2018	2019
Ranking	21 (tie)	19	7	8	10	7	8	19	22	28
Year	2020	2021	2022	2023	2024	2025	2026			
Ranking	N/A	23 (tie)	27	15 (tie)	49	–	–			

Golden Ticket Awards: Best New Ride for 2010
Year	2010
Ranking	4
