= Momonga Standing and Loop Coaster =

Steel roller coaster

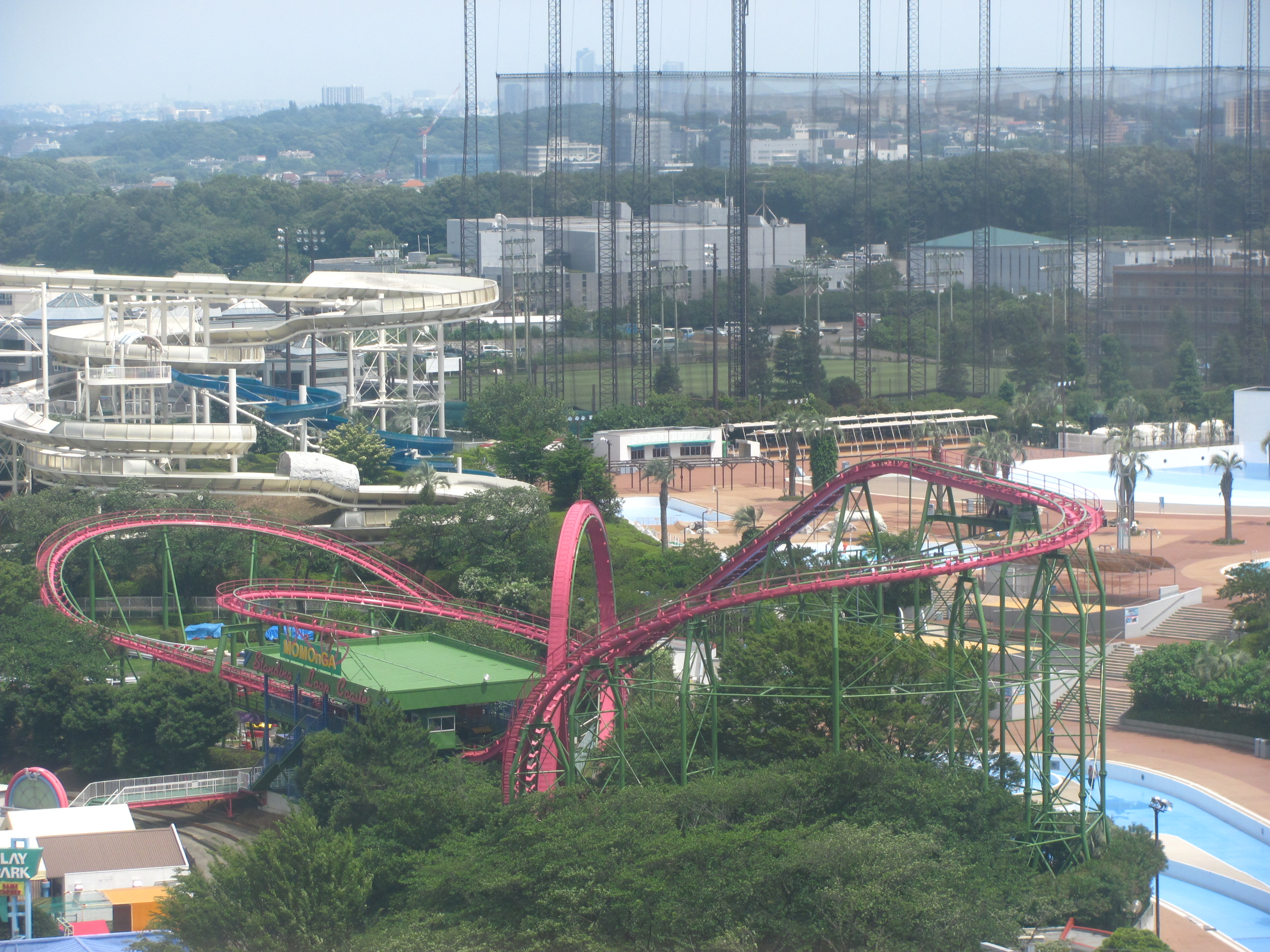

Yomiuriland
- Location: Yomiuriland
- Park section: Flag Street
- Coordinates: 35.624511°N 139.519331°E
- Status: Removed
- Opening date: May 3, 1979
- Closing date: September 20, 2021

General statistics
- Type: Steel – Stand-up
- Manufacturer: TOGO
- Model: Standing Coaster
- Track layout: Astro Comet II
- Lift/launch system: Chain lift hill
- Height: 82 ft (25 m)
- Length: 1,380 ft (420 m)
- Speed: 46.6 mph (75.0 km/h)
- Inversions: 1
- Duration: 1:10
- Max vertical angle: 35°
- Trains: 2 trains with 5 cars; riders arranged 2 across in 2 rows for a total of 20 riders per train
- Website: Archived Official Website
- Height restriction (Sit-down train): 110 centimetres (43 in)
- Height restriction (Stand-up train): 140 centimetres (55 in)
- Admission: 600 Yen per ride
- Momonga Standing and Loop Coaster at RCDB

Momonga Standing and Loop Coaster (often referred to as Loop Coaster MOMOnGA, Japanese: ループコースターMOMOnGA) was a steel roller coaster that operated from 1979 to 2021 at Yomiuriland in Inagi, Tokyo, Japan. The coaster was best known for simultaneously operating both a sit-down and stand-up roller coaster train, which also rendered it as one of the earliest known stand-up roller coasters.

== History ==
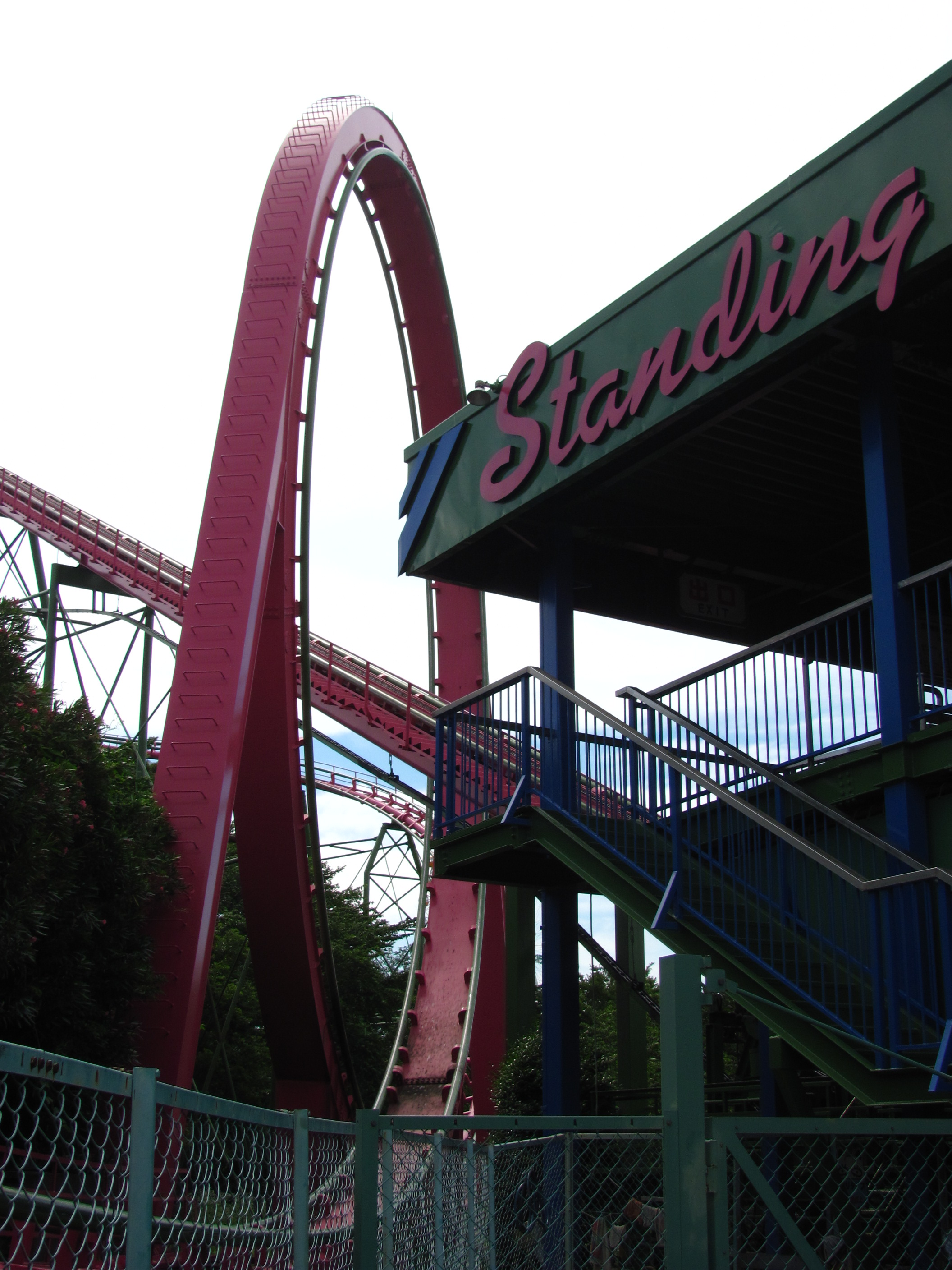
Loop Coaster MOMOnGA's vertical loop and station at Yomiuriland

The Standing and Loop Coaster first opened at Yomiuriland in 1979 as a sit-down steel coaster. In 1982, TOGO opened the Dangai coaster (then known as the Merry Dolphin) at the now-defunct Thrill Valley park in Gotemba, Shizuoka (which at the time went by the name Odakyu Gotemba Family Land). The coaster quickly incorporated a set of Togo's then-prototype stand-up trains, and that same year Yormuiriland also bought a standup train for the Standing and Loop Coaster. Since then, the roller coaster simultaneously operated both a standup and sit-down train with a modified sliding station. The success of these quickly attracted the interest of Ohio-based Kings Entertainment Company, who acquired a trio of standup coasters from Togo between 1984 and 1986; King Cobra at Kings Island, SkyRider at Canada's Wonderland, and Shockwave at Kings Dominion.

In August 2021, Yomuiriland that the Momonga Standing and Loop Coaster would permanently close after 42 years of operation. Beginning on September 4, the park launched a last riders campaign, where free souvenirs were handed out to participants and a lottery held to determine the coaster's last official riders. Momonga gave its last ride with the stand-up train on the evening of September 20, 2021.

== Characteristics ==
=== Trains ===
The Loop Coaster MOMOnGA operated with two 20-passenger trains throughout much of its lifetime; a sit-down train and a stand-up train, where guests rode the attraction while standing up. Both trains could be queued for separately, and operated with a sliding platform; while one train was making its circuit on the track, the other was loading and unloading guests on its respective side of the station. The addition of the stand-up train in 1982 rendered it as one of the first known stand-up roller coasters, and following the Dangai's closure in 2002 remained the oldest stand-up coaster in the world until its own closure in 2021.

=== Layout ===
Upon dispatch, the station platform slid the train sideways either to the left or right, connecting it to the coaster layout. Exiting the station, the train immediately ascended the 82-foot (25 m) tall chain lift hill. At its peak, riders made a right hand turn and descended into a curved drop, entering the coaster's sole inversion; a vertical loop wrapping around the lift hill. A counterclockwise helix followed, before riders made their final turnaround and rose into the brake run. The sliding track in the station then delivered the train sideways back to its respective platform. One ride on the Loop Coaster MOMOnGA lasted approximately 1 minute and 10 seconds.

=== Statistics ===
Loop Coaster MOMOnGA was 82 feet (25 m) tall, 1,380 feet (420 m) long, and reaches a top speed of 46.6 mph (75.0 km/h). An exact clone of the Loop Coaster MOMOnGA was built for the 1984 Otaru Expo, but was relocated to Rusutsu Resort in 1985 and continues to operate as Standing Coaster.

== See also ==
- Stand-up roller coaster
