= White Canyon =

White Canyon may refer to:

- White Canyon (San Juan County, Utah), a canyon in the United States that is known for several large natural bridges
- White Canyon (roller coaster), a former roller coaster at the Yomiuriland amusement park near Inagi, Tokyo, Japan
- Premonstratensians, The Order of Canons Regular of Prémontré, also known as the Premonstratensians, the Norbertines and, in Britain and Ireland, as the White Canons
