= King Cobra (roller coaster) =

Defunct roller coaster

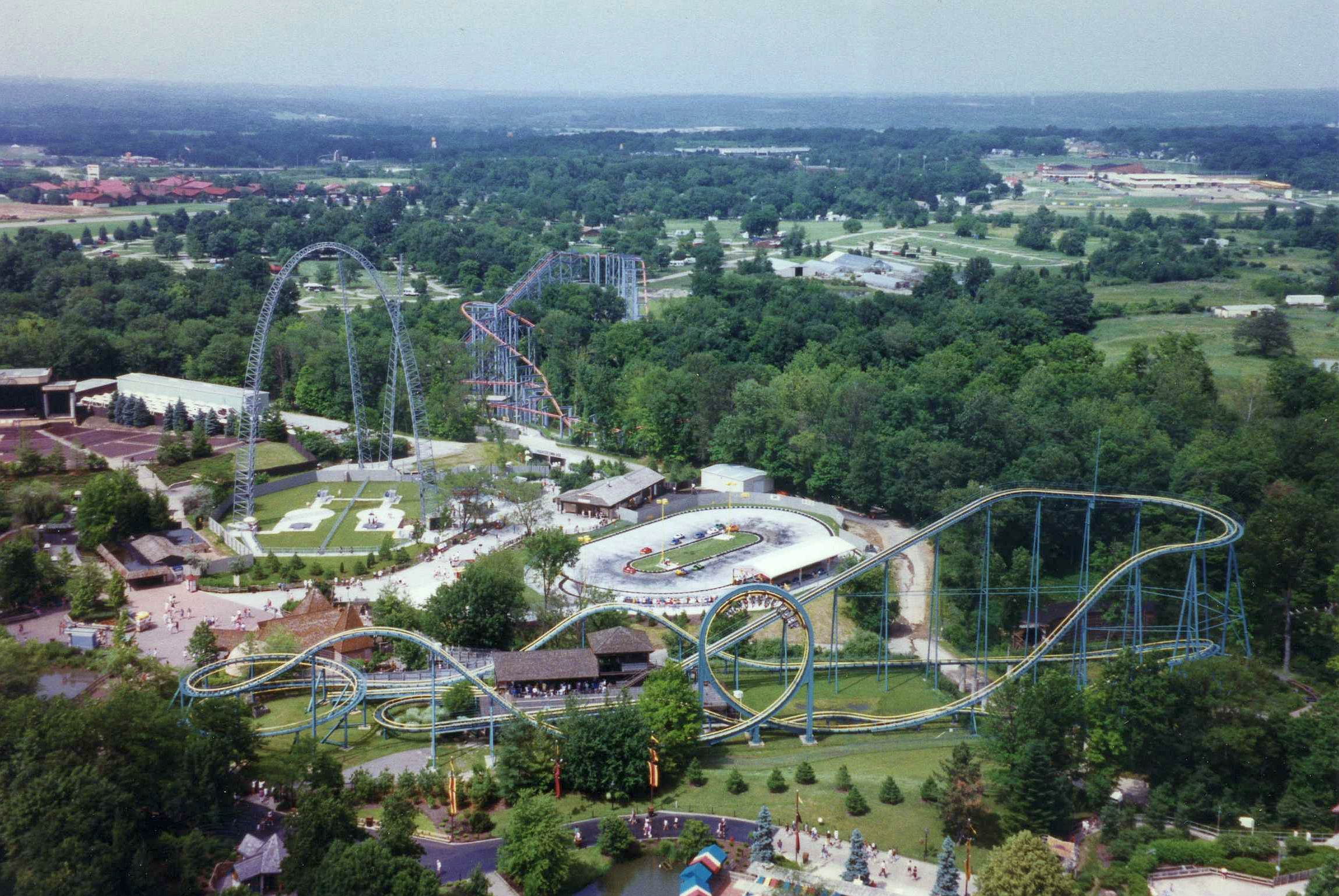
- King Cobra, in foreground, viewed from the Eiffel Tower (1996)

Kings Island
- Location: Kings Island
- Park section: Action Zone
- Coordinates: 39.344960°N 84.265880°W
- Status: Removed
- Opening date: April 22, 1984
- Closing date: November 5, 2001
- Cost: 3,000,000 USD
- Replaced by: SlingShot(2002-2021), Delirium, Banshee, Cargo Loco

General statistics
- Type: Steel – Stand-up
- Manufacturer: TOGO
- Designer: James Rogan
- Model: Standing Coaster
- Track layout: Astro Comet
- Lift/launch system: Chain lift hill
- Height: 95 ft (29 m)
- Drop: 90 ft (27 m)
- Length: 2,219 ft (676 m)
- Speed: 50 mph (80 km/h)
- Inversions: 1
- Duration: 2:00
- Max vertical angle: 53°
- Capacity: 1250 riders per hour
- Trains: 2 trains with 6 cars; riders arranged 2 across in 2 rows for a total of 24 riders per train
- King Cobra at RCDB

King Cobra was a stand-up roller coaster located at Kings Island in Mason, Ohio. Manufactured by TOGO, the roller coaster operated from 1984 to 2001, and it was the first in the world to be designed from the ground up as a stand-up configuration. Other stand-up coasters that preceded King Cobra were sit-down models later modified to accommodate stand-up trains.

== History ==
In April 1983, Kings Island announced plans to build a new roller coaster for the 1984 season. The park wanted a unique coaster design to celebrate the 100th anniversary of the first roller coaster in the United States, and a stand-up roller coaster design was selected. TOGO of Japan, which had previously modified other sit-down coasters into stand-up designs, was hired to build the attraction. It would become the first of its kind designed from the ground up as a stand-up model.

The prototype, named Astro-Comet, was built and tested in the parking lot of TOGO's facility in Tokyo. It featured a 95-foot-tall (29 m) lift hill, a 66-foot-tall (20 m) vertical loop, a 540-degree helix, and a maximum speed of 50 mph (80 km/h). Kings Island purchased the prototype, and construction began in December 1983. Park guests were surveyed to help name the new coaster, settling on King Cobra. The new attraction, marketed as the world's first stand-up coaster, opened to the public on April 22, 1984.

After the ride's manufacturer, TOGO, went out of business in 2001, parts for the ride became more expensive and harder to find. Following the 2001 season, Paramount Parks began to dismantle King Cobra and put it up for sale. The trains were stored inside the Flight of Fear building and the track in one of Kings Island's "graveyards" located on old Wild Animal Habitat land. When the ride didn't sell, the track was scrapped and the trains were relocated to Kings Dominion to be used as spare parts for Shockwave.

== Ride experience ==
After being loaded into the 24 passenger stand-up trains, the riders were taken up a 95-foot (29 m) hill, before turning 180 degrees to the right and encountering the first drop. The riders were first welcomed by the vertical loop, which was taken quickly and smoothly. Shortly after, the train climbed up the first camelback hill, allowing for some floater airtime, then dropped into a 540-degree helix, which had riders standing almost completely sideways. Upon exiting the helix, the second camelback hill was encountered and followed by the unique "trick track" section of the ride, where the track was straight, but banked to the left before turning to the right. Before hitting the brake run, the track went over two bunny hills, allowing brief moments of airtime, before the ride came to a complete stop. The train then turned to the right and was brought back to the station.

== Clones and similar attractions ==
Several parks featured stand-up roller coasters similar in design to King Cobra. SkyRider at Canada's Wonderland was a duplicate of King Cobra that opened a year later in 1985. It was closed in 2014 and moved to Cavallino Matto in Italy, where it reopened in 2015 as Freestyle. Shockwave at Kings Dominion featured a similar layout as well, with the exception of its finale: After reaching the second camelback hill, the track turned left into a bunny hill before entering the brake run, as opposed to King Cobra's turn to the right. Shockwave closed permanently in 2015.

The layout of Pink Typhoon Standing Coaster at Washuzan Highland, one of the last remaining Togo stand-up coasters in operation, is also similar to King Cobra's layout up until the second camelback hill. The trick track element was replaced by a bunny hill, which then leads to a right turn and a second bunny hill prior to the final brake run.

== Incidents ==
In August 1999, both King Cobra and Drop Tower: Scream Zone were temporarily closed as a precaution following two separate incidents that occurred at Kings Dominion and California's Great America. King Cobra reopened to the public two days later.
