= Valravn (roller coaster) =

Roller coaster at Cedar Point

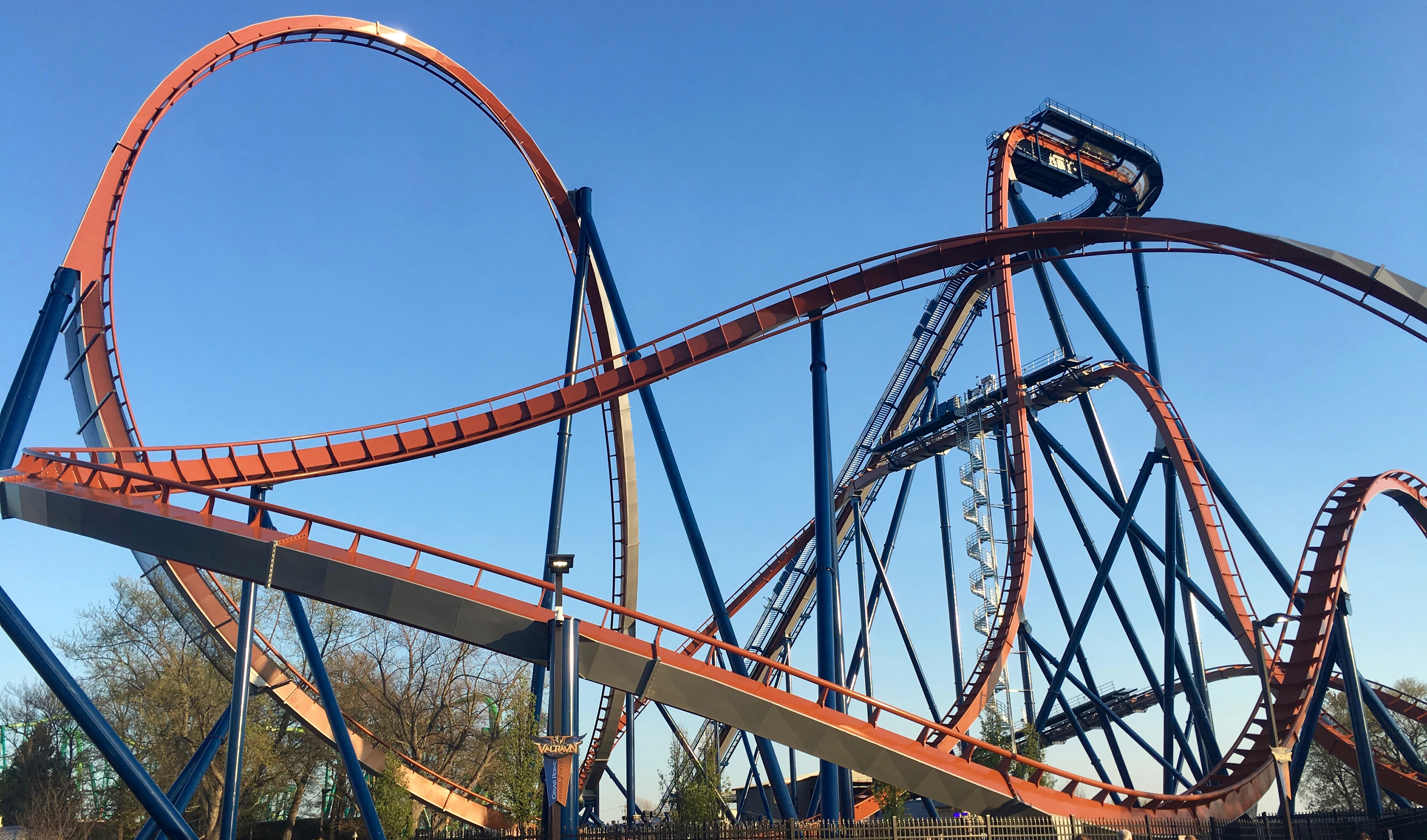
- Valravn in May 2016

Cedar Point
- Location: Cedar Point
- Park section: Main Midway
- Coordinates: 41.481298°N 82.683970°W
- Status: Operating
- Soft opening date: May 6, 2016
- Opening date: May 7, 2016
- Cost: $25 million
- Replaced: Good Time Theatre; Turnpike Cars

General statistics
- Type: Steel – Dive Coaster
- Manufacturer: Bolliger & Mabillard
- Model: Dive Coaster
- Lift/launch system: Chain lift hill
- Height: 223 ft (68 m)
- Drop: 214 ft (65 m)
- Length: 3,415 ft (1,041 m)
- Speed: 75 mph (121 km/h)
- Inversions: 3
- Duration: 2:23
- Max vertical angle: 90°
- Capacity: 1,200 riders per hour
- Height restriction: 52 in (132 cm)
- Trains: 3 trains with 3 cars; riders arranged 8 across in a single row for a total of 24 riders per train
- Fast Lane Plus only available
- Valravn at RCDB

Valravn is a steel roller coaster at Cedar Point amusement park in Sandusky, Ohio. Built and designed by Bolliger & Mabillard (B&M), it was the first Dive Coaster model in the Cedar Fair chain of parks and opened on May 7, 2016, as the tallest, fastest, and longest of its kind in the world. It remained the tallest (Note: Alongside Yukon Striker at Canada's Wonderland) until the opening of Tormenta Rampaging Run at Six Flags Over Texas in 2026. Valravn is also the first Dive Coaster to use B&M's vest-style, over-the-shoulder restraints and the third Dive Coaster overall to open in the United States. The installation marked the hundredth roller coaster from B&M, dating back to the company's founding in 1988.

Following on the heels of Rougarou, which opened at Cedar Point in 2015, Valravn also takes its name from cultural folklore. The ride's theme is based on a mythological bird from Danish folklore called the valravn, which means "raven of the slain".

== History ==
In January 2015, the Sandusky Register obtained a memo from Swiss manufacturer Bolliger & Mabillard (B&M) announcing the arrival of a record-breaking Dive Coaster at Cedar Point for the 2016 season. The memo stated that the ride may be installed on land formerly occupied by the Good Time Theatre, which was demolished a few months earlier. The park's spokesman, Bryan Edwards, later confirmed that the Dive Coaster was one of several possibilities the park was considering.

Site preparation began in late December 2014, when the Dodgems and Calypso rides were relocated to the Lakeside midway section of the park. The Good Time Theatre and Turnpike Cars were demolished and removed as well in early 2015. In May 2015, interest in the new ride grew when Cedar Point trademarked the name Valravn, which in Danish folklore stands for a mythological bird known as the "raven of the slain", describing a raven that feasts on the dead bodies of those who perish in battle. In early August of the same year, images showing the layout of the new roller coaster and its logo appeared in the amusement park's smartphone app. Responding to the leak, Cedar Point temporarily disabled the app on Google Play and announced that details would be revealed on August 18, 2015. However, the park decided to postpone the announcement following an incident in which a park visitor was struck and killed when entering a restricted area underneath Raptor. Visitors began to report seeing pieces of new roller coaster track being stored on park property. On September 9, 2015, Cedar Point officially unveiled plans for Valravn.

The roller coaster is based on the Dive Coaster model developed by B&M and is also the company's hundredth roller coaster installation. Its trains were the first on this model to use a "vest" style over-the-shoulder restraint system, similar to the design used on Cedar Point's GateKeeper and other B&M Wing Coasters. Each train consists of three cars, each of which has a single row holding eight passengers, for a total of 24 riders per train. Construction finished as Valravn's last piece of track was put in place on March 2, 2016. Video showing the ride being tested was released in early April 2016.

== Ride experience ==
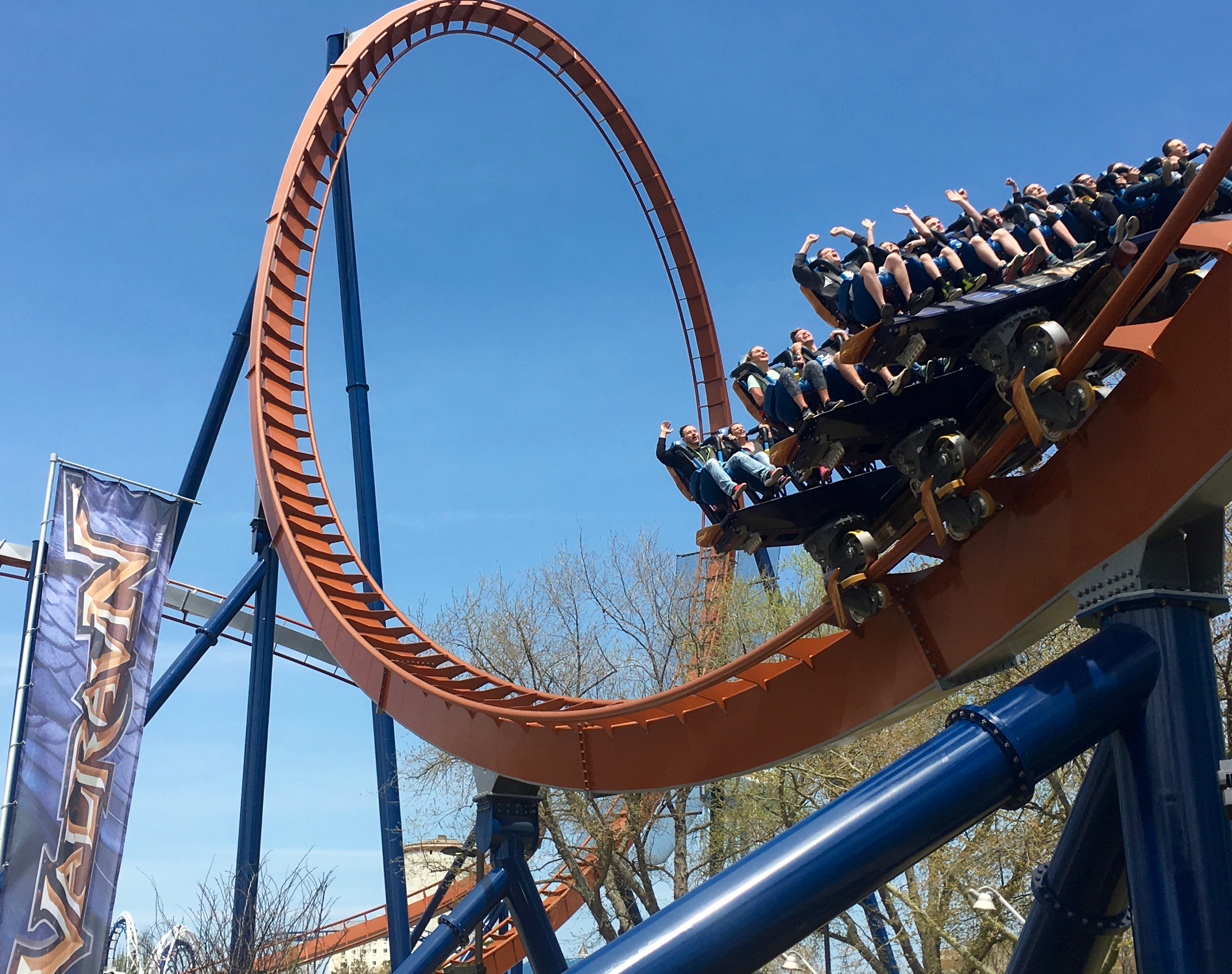
Valravn train going through an Immelmann inversion

After leaving the station, the train turns 180 degrees to the left, then begins to ascend its 223-foot-tall (68 m) chain lift hill. Upon reaching the crest of the hill, the train turns right and pauses for several seconds as it slightly hangs over the edge of the first drop. The train then suddenly releases, descending 214 feet (65 m) at a 90-degree angle and reaching a maximum speed of 75 mph (121 km/h). It then immediately enters a 165-foot (50 m) Immelmann loop before rising into the mid-course brake run. The train then drops 131 feet (40 m) and enters a dive loop, followed by a third and final inversion with a 270-degree zero-g roll. Riders experience an airtime hill and turn left before entering the final brake run.

== Characteristics ==
=== Location ===
Valravn is located on a new midway stretching from the Blue Streak area to near Celebration Plaza. Another way it can be accessed is behind the cobra roll on the Raptor and is the centerpiece of a redesigned Marina entrance.

=== Manufacturer ===
Valravn is a Dive Coaster model manufactured by Swiss roller coaster firm Bolliger & Mabillard. Notably, it is the 100th roller coaster produced by B&M and the fourth to be built at Cedar Point, following Raptor, GateKeeper and Rougarou. It is the 10th Dive Coaster to be built in the world and the third in the United States, with the other two being SheiKra at Busch Gardens Tampa and Griffon at Busch Gardens Williamsburg.

=== Trains ===
Valravn operates with three-tiered seating, open-air steel and fiberglass trains. Each train consists of three cars with eight seats per car, for a total capacity of 24 riders per train and approximately 1,200 riders per hour. Riders are restrained by flexible over-the-shoulder restraints and interlocking seat belts, and riders must be at least 52 inches (130 cm) tall to ride. Valravn is the first Dive Coaster to use B&M's new restraint system, which can also be found on GateKeeper.

=== Track ===
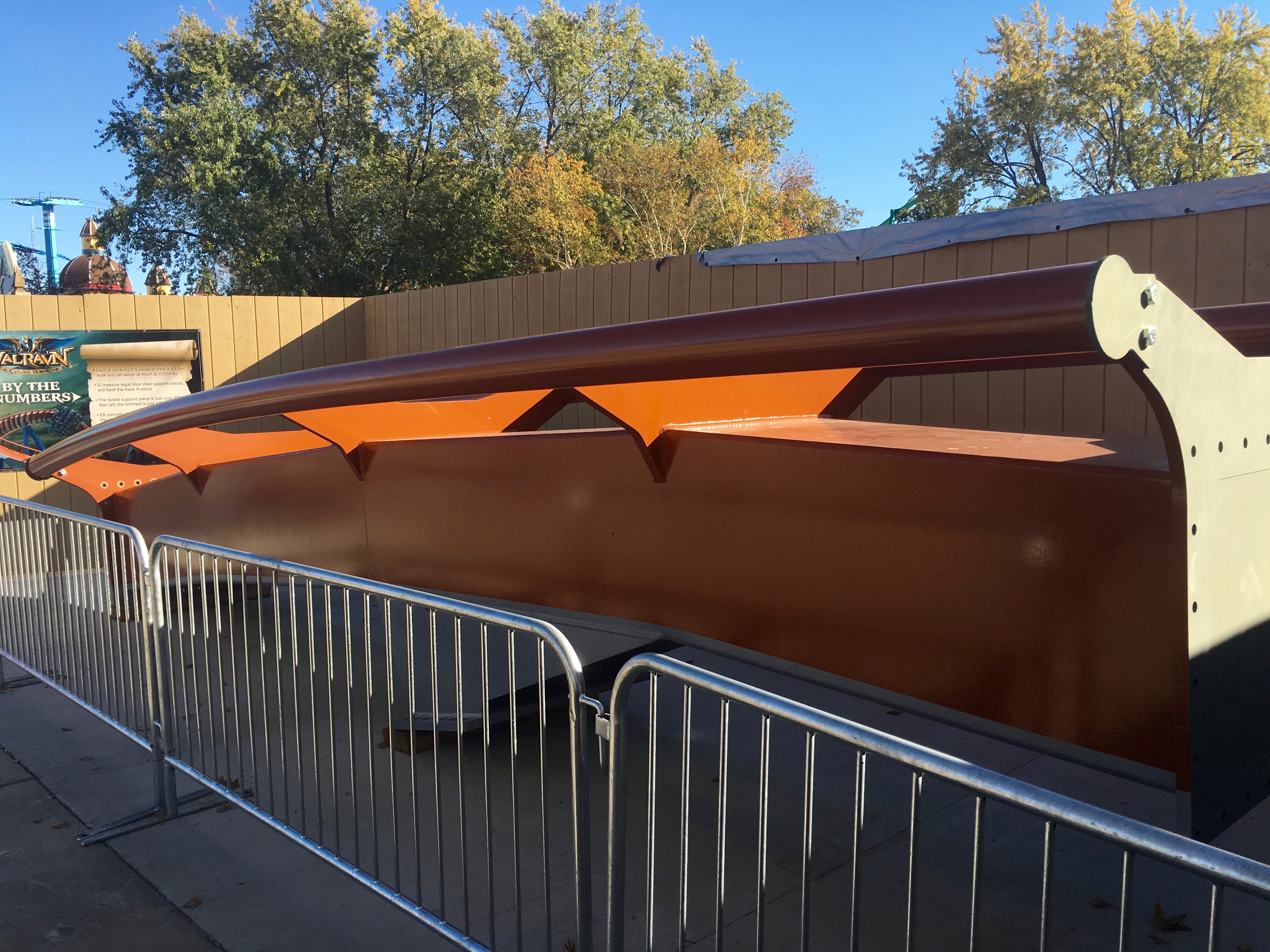
Piece of track on display during construction.

The steel tubular track is 3,415 feet (1,041 m) long and the lift is approximately 223 feet (68 m) high. The track colors are copper and silver with the supports being regal blue. There are 103 pieces of track with the heaviest weighing 17,000 pounds (7,700 kg). The width of the track is 6.5 feet wide, making it the widest track in the park. A total of 51 supports hold the track in place. The track and supports were manufactured by Clermont Steel Fabricators in Batavia in southwest Ohio.

== Records ==
Upon opening in 2016, Valravn broke six Dive Coaster records and helped to break four amusement park records. On August 15, 2018, Canada's Wonderland announced Yukon Striker, a dive coaster which shares Valravn's height record of 223 feet (68 m) but surpasses other records including speed, drop length, track length, and number of inversions.

=== Dive Coaster records ===
Valravn held records upon opening for the following:

- Tallest Dive Coaster – 223 feet (68 m)
- Fastest Dive Coaster – 75 miles per hour (121 km/h)
- Longest Dive Coaster – 3,415 feet (1,041 m)
- Longest drop on a Dive Coaster – 214 feet (65 m)
- Most inversions on a Dive Coaster – 3
- Tallest inversion on a Dive Coaster – 165 feet (50 m)

=== Park records ===
As a result of Valravn's opening, Cedar Point held the records for the following:

- Most roller coasters taller than 200 feet (61 m) at a park – 5
- Most rides at one park – 72
- Most steel roller coaster track at one park – 52,125 feet (15,888 m)
- Most roller coaster track at one park – 60,110 feet (18,320 m)

== Reception ==
=== Rankings ===
Golden Ticket Awards: Best New Ride for 2016
| Ranking | 4 |

== See also ==
- Incidents at Six Flags parks
