= Yukon Striker =

Roller coaster at Canada's Wonderland in Vaughan, Ontario, Canada

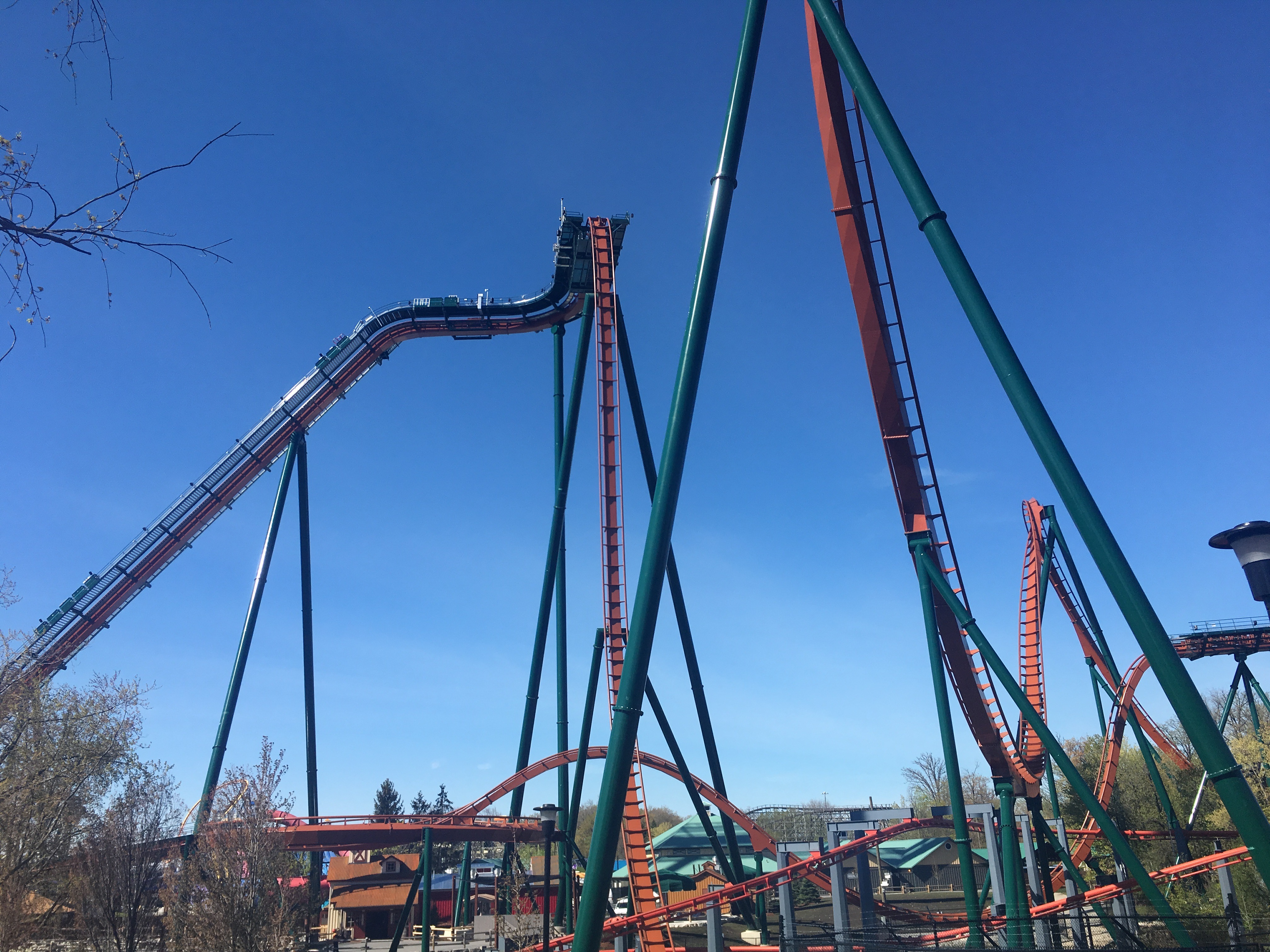
- Yukon Striker's first drop and Immelmann loop

Canada's Wonderland
- Location: Canada's Wonderland
- Park section: Frontier Canada
- Coordinates: 43.8402°N 79.5430°W
- Status: Operating
- Soft opening date: 24 April 2019
- Opening date: 3 May 2019
- Replaced: SkyRider

General statistics
- Type: Steel – Dive Coaster
- Manufacturer: Bolliger & Mabillard
- Model: Dive Coaster
- Lift/launch system: Chain lift hill
- Height: 68 m (223 ft)
- Drop: 74.7 m (245 ft)
- Length: 1,104.9 m (3,625 ft)
- Speed: 130 km/h (81 mph)
- Inversions: 4
- Duration: 3:25
- Max vertical angle: 90°
- Capacity: 1,329 riders per hour
- Height restriction: 52–77 in (132–196 cm)
- Trains: 3 trains with 3 cars; riders arranged 8 across in a single row for a total of 24 riders per train
- Fast Lane Plus only available
- Yukon Striker at RCDB

Yukon Striker is a steel roller coaster at Canada's Wonderland in Vaughan, Ontario. Designed as a Dive Coaster from manufacturer Bolliger & Mabillard, the ride opened to the general public on 3 May 2019 in place of SkyRider, a roller coaster that was removed from the park in 2014. Featuring a height of 68 metres (223 ft), a length of 1,105 metres (3,625 ft), and a maximum speed of 130 km/h (81 mph), Yukon Striker was the world's tallest (Note: Record shared with Valravn at Cedar Point), longest, and fastest dive coaster until the opening of Tormenta Rampaging Run at Six Flags Over Texas in 2026. Its four inversions and drop length of 75 metres (245 ft) also set world records among dive coaster models.

== History ==
Following the park's removal of SkyRider, Canada's Wonderland began preparations for a new ride. In 2014, the park requested a geotechnical investigation of the area, extracting soil samples to assess building a roller coaster's concrete foundation. On 19 December 2017, Canada's Wonderland filed an application for a permit to build nine support footers on the water and amend the waterway with a tunnel travelling under the pond within the park. A permit was required from the Toronto and Region Conservation Authority (TRCA), as parts of the ride, and the pond beneath it, fall within the Don River watershed. The application was approved by the TRCA on 9 January 2018, with construction on the ride's foundations beginning later that month.

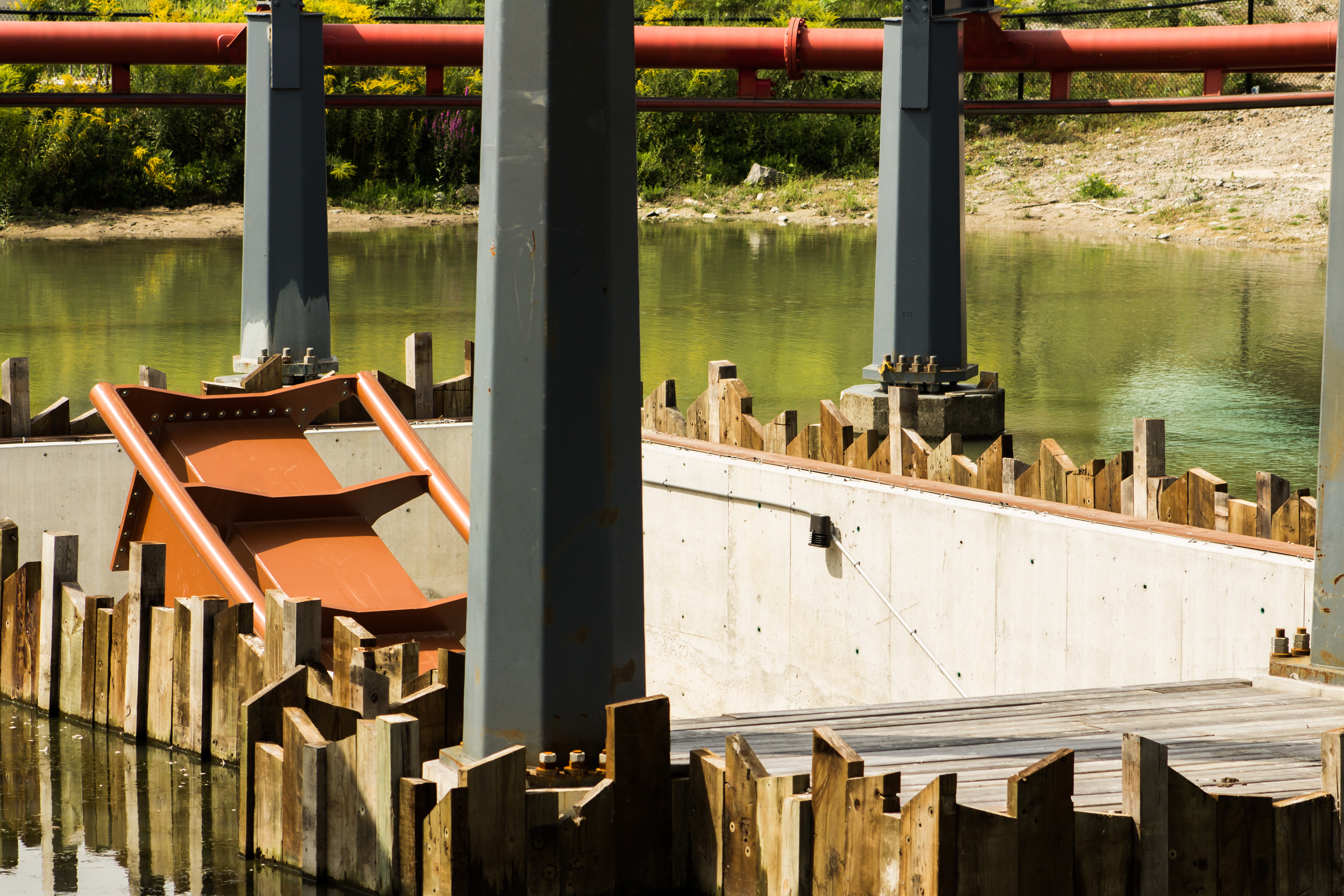
The completed tunnel for Yukon Striker in August 2018. Work on the tunnel was completed in early 2018, allowing for Vortex to stay operational for the 2018 season

The diversionary channel was built under the pond in order to facilitate the creation of the underwater tunnel, as well as prevent silt runoff downstream. Construction for the diversionary channel, as well as the ride's underwater tunnel, required the temporary removal of two track pieces and a few supports belonging to Vortex, a roller coaster adjacent to Yukon Striker. Work on the tunnel was completed before the park opened for 2018, with the installation of four track pieces and two water pumps to pump rainwater out of the tunnel. With the tunnel completed, the removed pieces from Vortex were reinstalled, allowing for Vortex to be operational by the time the park reopened for the 2018 season.

In July 2018, following continuous construction during the operating season, the park began teasing a planned announcement scheduled the following month. On 15 August 2018, the roller coaster was officially introduced to the public, with renderings and details about the ride revealed. Construction for the roller coaster was completed on 4 February 2019, with the installation of the last track piece onto the 360-loop. Installation of the ride train, and landscaping of the surrounding area began after construction was completed.

On 24 April 2019, seventy-two people who helped raise funds for The Hospital for Sick Children were invited to test-ride Yukon Striker. In the days that followed, members of the media from Ontario, and neighbouring Buffalo, New York, were invited to ride Yukon Striker. The ride was later opened to the general public on 3 May 2019, during the park's opening day for the 2019 season.

== Characteristics ==
The ride was designed by Bolliger & Mabillard, with the Canadian construction firm, E.S. Fox, contracted to build the ride. Secant Engineers, a local structural engineering firm, was contracted to design the ride's tunnel, as well as the ride's foundations. It is the first Dive Coaster to be built in Canada.

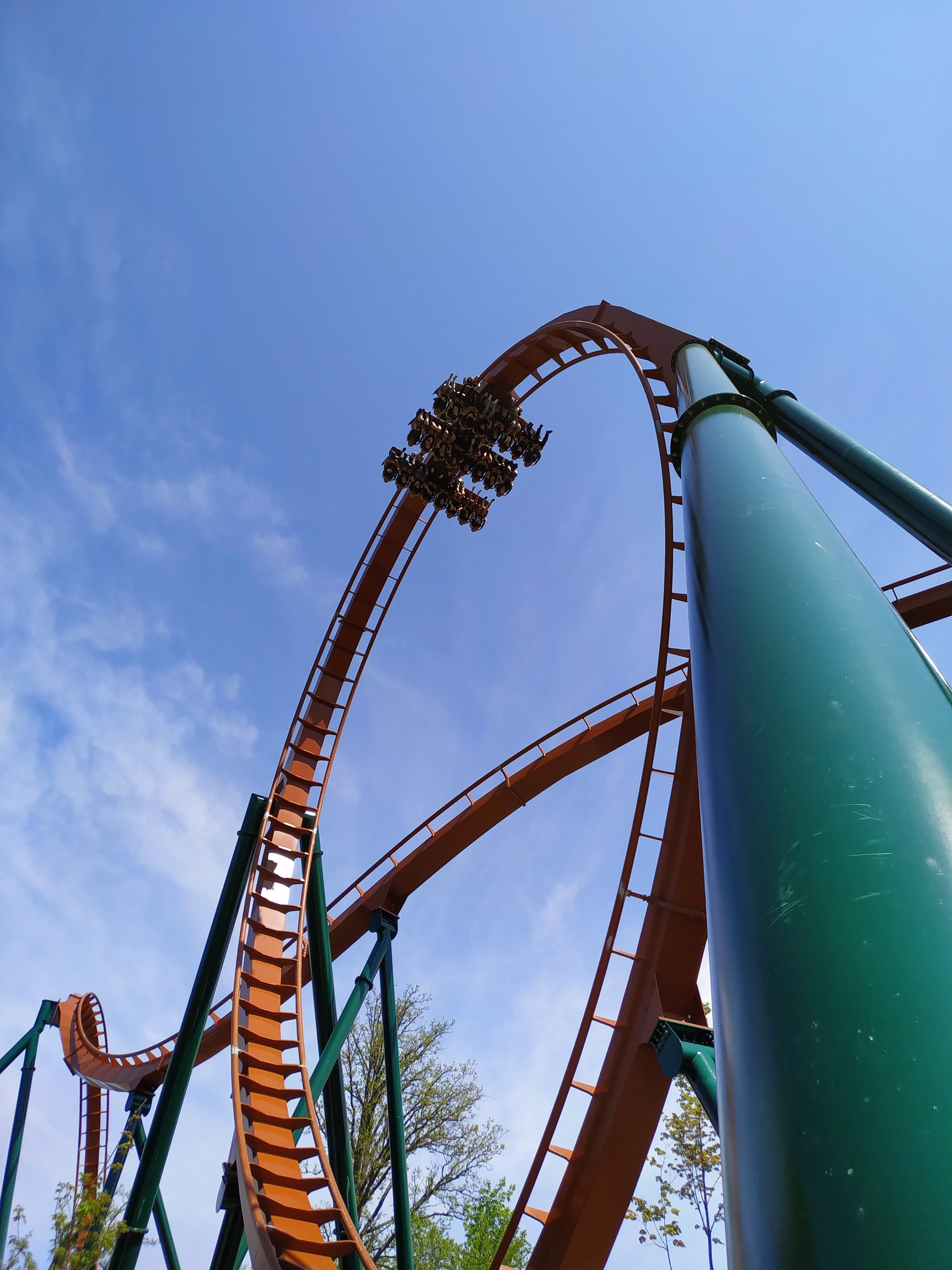
The ride's vertical loop

The steel track is 1,105 metres (3,625 ft) long and the lift is 68 metres (223 ft) high. The track is made up of 107 individual orange-coloured steel track pieces, the total of which weights 1,213 metric tonnes. There are 42 support columns used to support the ride. The steel used to build the roller coaster originated from Clermont Steel Fabricators in Batavia, Ohio.

=== Trains ===
Yukon Striker operates with three fibreglass trains each seating 3 rows of 8 for a total of 24 riders per train. The trains use vest restraints which were introduced on B&M's Wing Coasters. Each train is coloured a different colour, gold, silver or bronze.

=== Ride experience ===
After departing the station, the train turns 180 degrees to the right and ascends 68 metres (223 ft) up the lift hill, travelling at an angle of 47 degrees. It then turns 90 degrees to the right, halting at the 90-degree drop, where a portion of the train hangs slightly over. After pausing for 3 seconds, riders plunge 75 metres (245 ft) through the middle of Vortex's helix and into an underwater tunnel, reaching a top speed of 130 km/h (81 mph). After exiting the tunnel, the train rises into an Immelmann loop. The Immelmann loop itself is 57 metres (187 ft) above the floor of the tunnel, 45 metres (148 ft) above the exit of the tunnel, and 50 metres (165 ft) above the water Vortex sits on. Following the Immelmann loop, the train then enters a Zero-G Winder, a combination of a Zero-G Roll and a Sidewinder. This is followed by a complete 360-degree vertical loop, a first for a Dive Coaster and a second Immelmann loop before reaching the mid-course brake run, placed directly above Timberwolf Falls. The train dives down another steep drop into an airtime hill and then proceeds counterclockwise through a 360-degree helix that ends at the final brake run. One cycle of the ride lasts approximately 205 seconds.

== Records ==
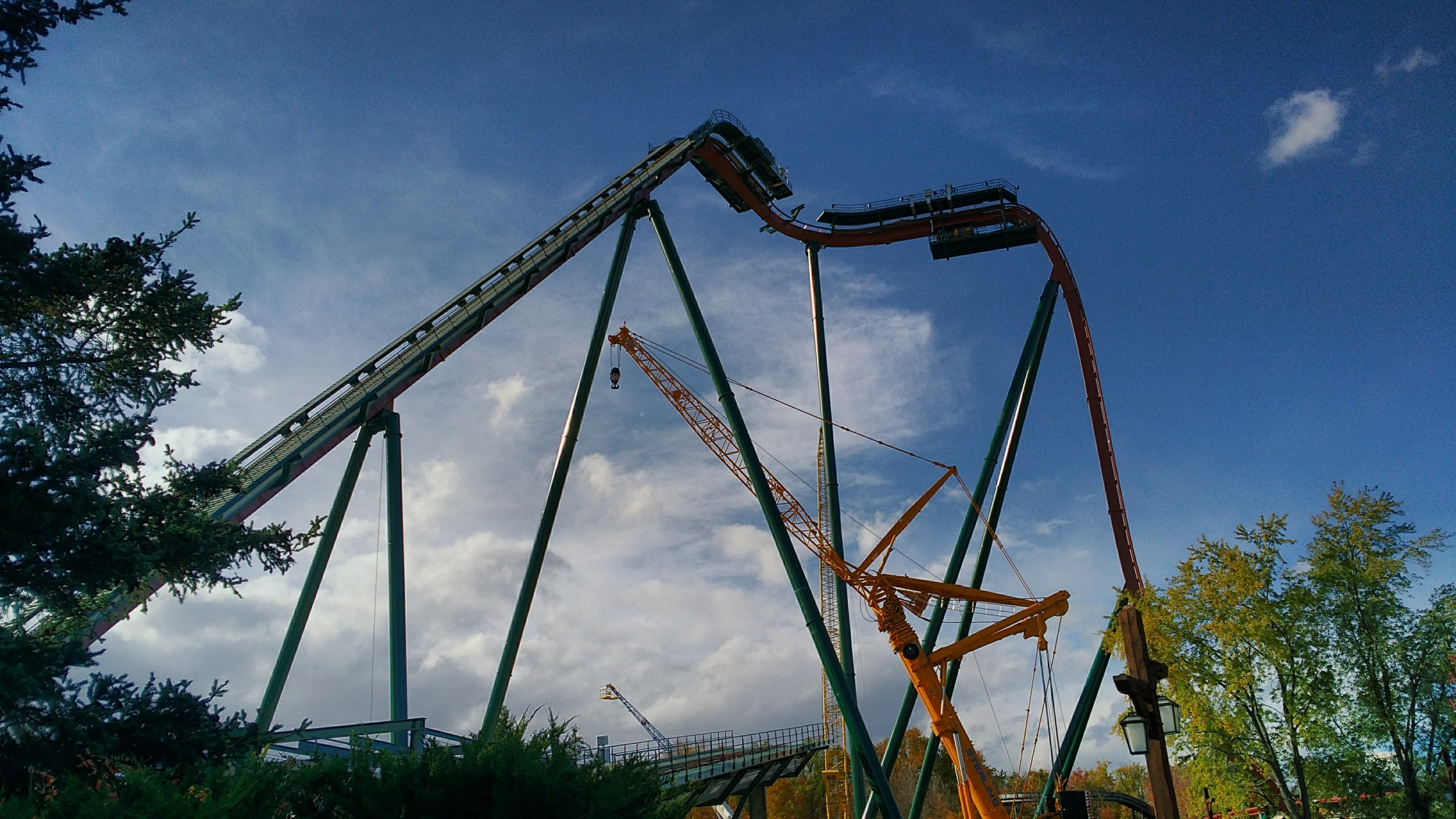
Lift hill and portions of the record-setting drop during the ride's construction

When it opened in May 2019, Yukon Striker set three world records among Dive Coaster models for speed, length, and drop height. It became the fastest with a maximum speed of 130 km/h (81 mph), as well as the longest with a track length of 1,105 metres (3,625 ft). Although its height of 68 metres (223 ft) ties Valravn at Cedar Point, Yukon Striker features the longest drop on a Dive Coaster at 75 metres (245 ft). However, Yukon Striker has since lost its records, as Tormenta: Rampaging Run at Six Flags Over Texas broke the height, length and speed records for a Dive Coaster. In addition to the records, its 360-degree vertical loop is also a first for Dive Coasters.

== Reception ==
The Golden Ticket Awards is an annual set of awards given out by Amusement Today, a newspaper published for the amusement industry. The rankings are selected by an international poll conducted by the newspaper. In 2019, Yukon Striker was ranked as the 34th best steel roller coaster in the world. When Yukon Striker debuted in 2019, the newspaper named Yukon Striker the fourth Best New Roller Coaster of the year. In the same year, the ride received the Best Innovation Award from Amusement Today for the ride's loose article and transfer system.

Golden Ticket Awards: Top steel Roller Coasters
Year									1998	1999
Ranking									–	–
Year	2000	2001	2002	2003	2004	2005	2006	2007	2008	2009
Ranking	–	–	–	–	–	–	–	–	–	–
Year	2010	2011	2012	2013	2014	2015	2016	2017	2018	2019
Ranking	–	–	–	–	–	–	–	–	–	34
Year	2020	2021	2022	2023	2024	2025	2026			
Ranking	N/A	–	–	–	–	–	–			

== See also ==
- 2019 in amusement parks
- List of Canada's Wonderland attractions
