= Yomiuriland =

Japanese amusement park in the western Tokyo

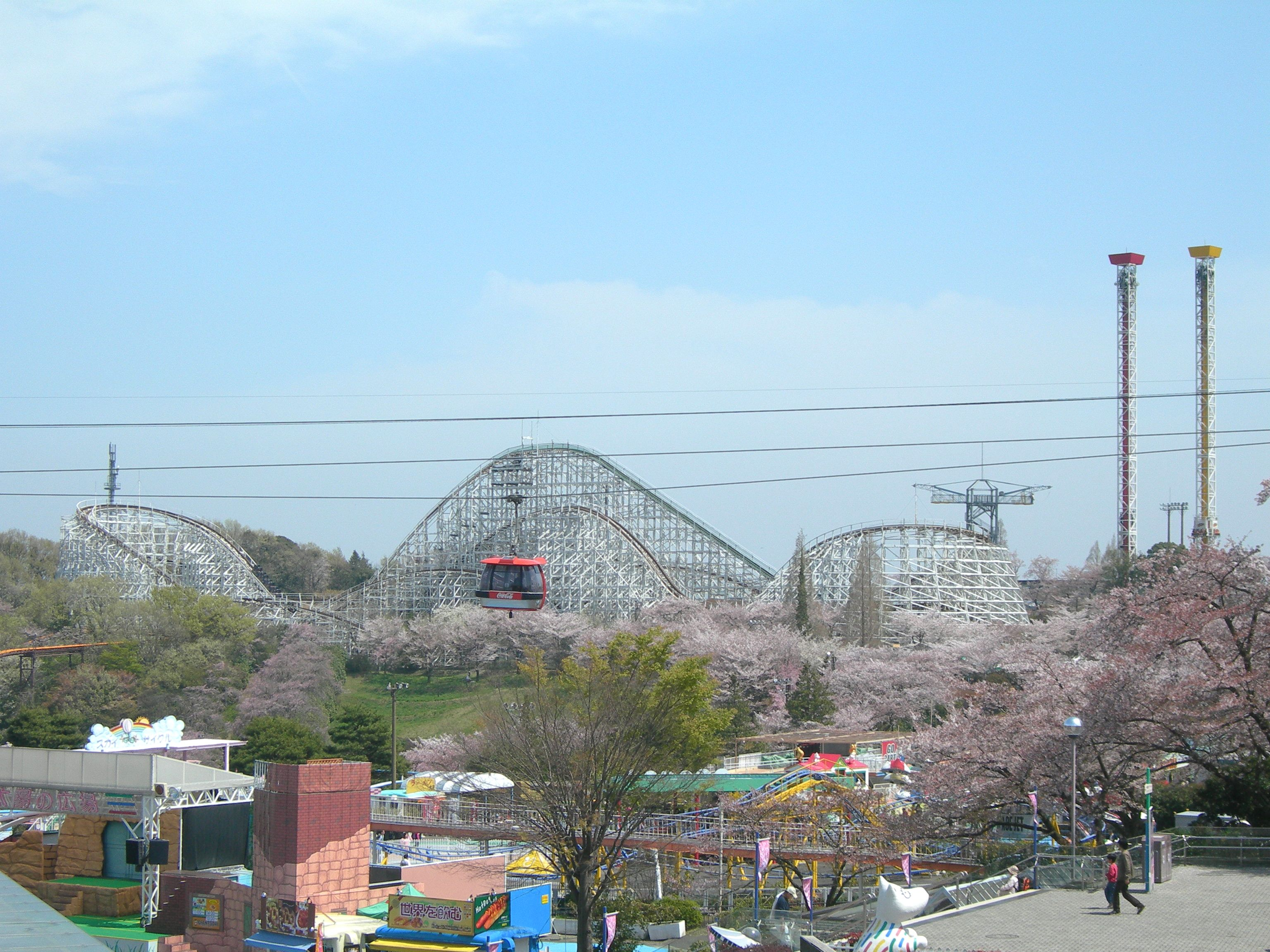
- White Canyon at Yomiuriland in 2010. This ride closed in 2013, three years after this photo was taken.
- Interactive map of Yomiuriland
- Location: Inagi, Tokyo, Japan
- Coordinates: 35°37′33″N 139°31′7″E
- Status: Operating
- Opened: 19 March 1964; 62 years ago
- Owner: Yomiuriland Co., Ltd.
- Slogan: 空から行けちゃう遊園地
- Website: www.yomiuriland.com/en/

Yomiuriland (よみうりランド, Yomiurirando) is an amusement park in Inagi, Tokyo and Tama-ku, Kawasaki, Kanagawa Prefecture, Japan that first opened on 19 March 1964. It is situated on hillsides, and features rides such as roller coasters and water flumes. It is home to Yomiuri Giants Stadium, one of the training fields for the Yomiuri Giants baseball team, and was the primary training ground before Tokyo Dome was completed. It is operated and run by Yomiuriland Co., Ltd., a wholly owned subsidiary of The Yomiuri Shimbun Holdings.

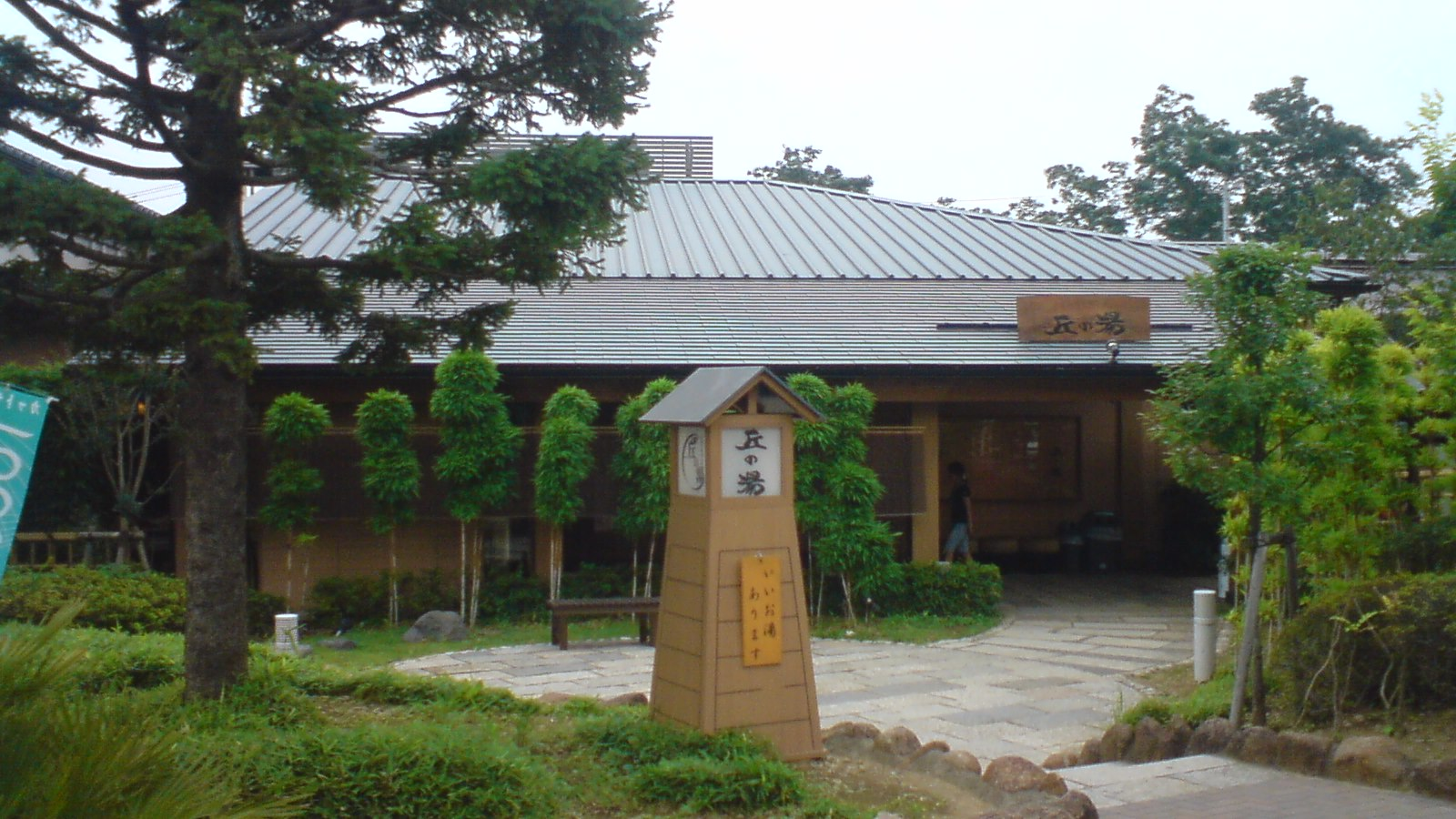
Yomiuriland's bathhouse

== Access ==
It can be accessed by two train stations, Keio Sagamihara Line's Keiō-Yomiuriland Station or Yomiuriland-mae Station of Odakyu.

== Attractions ==
Yomiuriland has 44 attractions from thrilling rides to family-friendly rides. Yomiuriland also has about 1,000 cherry blossoms during the spring. During the summer (usually from June 30 - September 9), visitors can enjoy Pool WAI (Water Amusement Island), a water park for an additional fee. Jewellumination lights up the park with a massive LED display inspired by gemstone colors. These attraction each contain their own unique atmosphere and diversity in rides. There are also many shops and food courts around the park. A bath house was constructed to attract more senior citizens.

=== Forthcoming ===
PokéPark Kanto opened at Yomiuriland on 5 February 2026.

== Roller coasters ==
=== Operating ===
- Bandit, a TOGO sitdown coaster that was the tallest in the world when it opened.
- DinoRunner, a powered family coaster from an unknown manufacturer.
- Space Factory, Gerstlauer's first inverted roller coaster.
- Spin Runway, a Mack Rides Spinning Coaster
- Wan Wan Coaster Wandit, a Hoei Sangyo family coaster.

=== Defunct ===
- SL Coaster
- White Canyon
- Twist Coaster Robin
- Momonga Standing and Loop Coaster
