= Freestyle (roller coaster) =

Roller coaster

- Previously known as SkyRider (1985–2014) at Canada's Wonderland
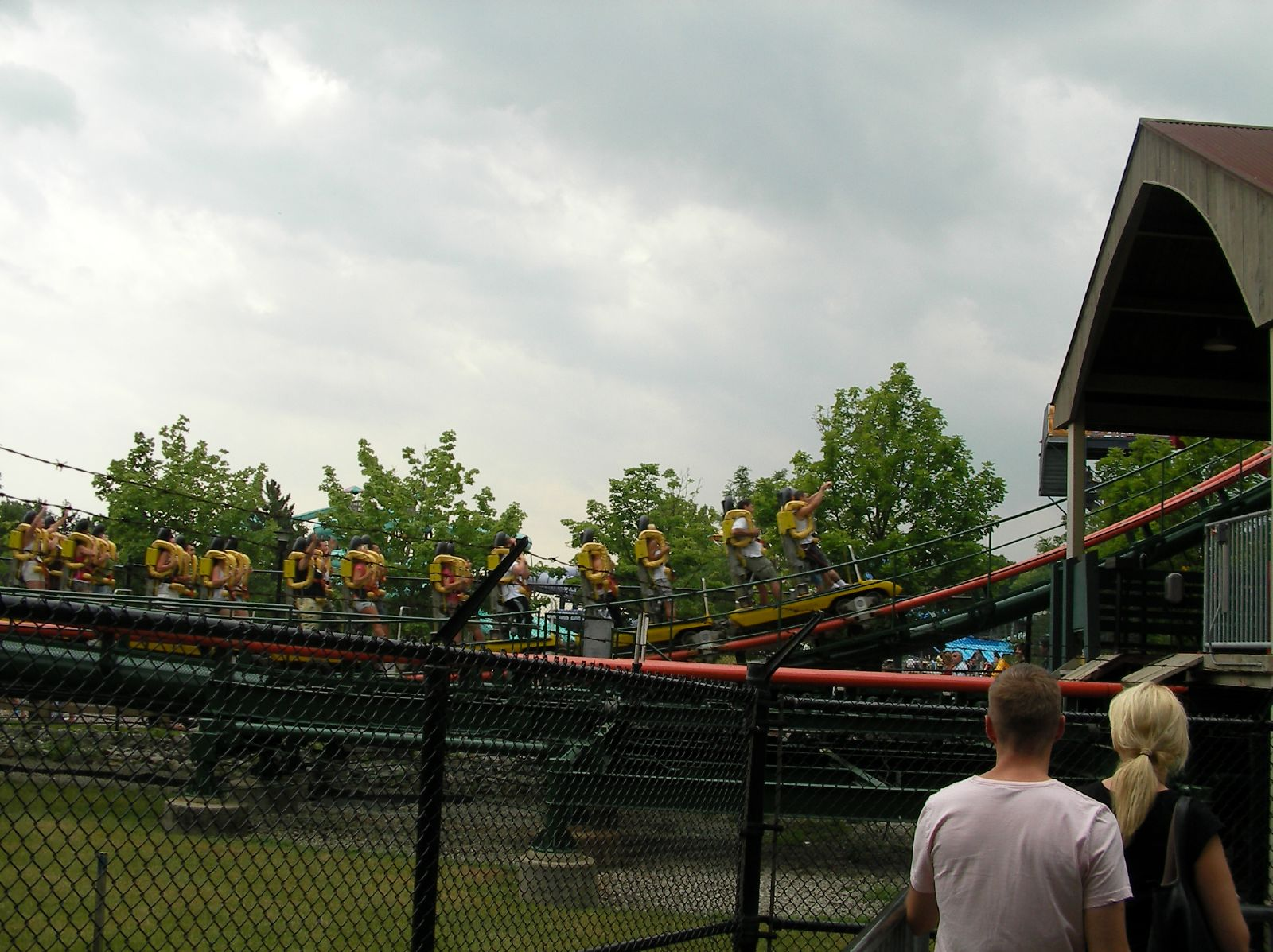
- Freestyle when it was known as SkyRider at Canada's Wonderland

Cavallino Matto
- Coordinates: 43.1821°N 10.5447°E
- Status: Operating
- Opening date: July 18, 2015
- Freestyle at Cavallino Matto at RCDB

Canada's Wonderland
- Coordinates: 43.840209°N 79.542890°W
- Status: Removed
- Opening date: May 4, 1985
- Closing date: September 1, 2014
- Replaced by: Yukon Striker (2019); Tundra Twister (2023)
- Freestyle at Canada's Wonderland at RCDB

General statistics
- Type: Steel – Stand-up
- Manufacturer: TOGO
- Model: Standing Coaster
- Track layout: Astro Comet
- Lift/launch system: Chain lift hill
- Height: 26.8 m (88 ft)
- Drop: 25.6 m (84 ft)
- Length: 390.99 m (1,282.8 ft)
- Speed: 82 km/h (51 mph)
- Inversions: 1
- Duration: 1:32
- Height restriction: 140 cm (4 ft 7 in)
- Trains: 2 trains with 6 cars; riders arranged 2 across in 2 rows for a total of 24 riders per train

Freestyle is a stand-up roller coaster operating at Cavallino Matto in Tuscany, Italy. It opened as the park's fifth roller coaster on July 18, 2015. Freestyle originally opened at Canada's Wonderland in 1985 as SkyRider and closed in 2014. Built by TOGO, it was the second stand-up roller coaster from the company following the now-defunct King Cobra, which opened the previous year at Kings Island.

On August 6, 2014, Canada's Wonderland announced that the ride would close permanently on September 1, 2014. The coaster accommodated nearly 23 million guests during its lifespan. In the Fall of 2014, SkyRider was sold, dismantled and relocated overseas to Cavallino Matto. It was reassembled and opened in 2015 as Freestyle. Yukon Striker, a Bolliger & Mabillard Dive Coaster, is currently located in the space vacated by SkyRider.

== SkyRider Memories Contest ==
In August 2014, Canada's Wonderland announced it would be holding a special contest for thrill seekers before the ride's official retirement. The contest was held on Canada's Wonderland official Twitter page under the banner "SkyRiderMemories", where 24 lucky winners were invited to have the final ride on SkyRider before its official closing on September 1, 2014 at 8pm. The winners were also given one of SkyRider's roller coaster wheels to keep as a souvenir.

== Similar rides ==
While SkyRider was relocated in 2014, King Cobra was put in storage at sister park Kings Island before the start of the 2002 season and eventually scrapped in 2008. Freestyle is the second oldest stand-up roller coaster in operation. Shockwave at Kings Dominion had a similar track layout until the second camelback hill, where instead of a trick track and a turn to the right, the ride immediately turned to the left and went over one bunny hill before entering the brake run. As the last TOGO stand up and the oldest Stand Up in North America, Shockwave closed on the 9th of August, making room for Delirium, a HUSS Giant Frisbee.

In Japan, the Pink Typhoon Standing Coaster at Washuzan Highland also has a similar layout to Freestyle until after the second camelback hill, where the trip back to the brake run is shorter and does not feature a banked section of straight track. Unlike Freestyle, only one of the two trains used on Star Jet has riders needing to stand up, because of the standing-up seats. The second train is a standard TOGO sit-down train that has rider's facing backwards throughout the ride.

== See also ==
- King Cobra (roller coaster)
- Shockwave (Kings Dominion)
