= Takakonuma Greenland =

Former theme park in Fukushima, Japan

- Previously known as Takakonuma Family Park
- Location within Fukushima Prefecture
- Location: Date City, Fukushima Prefecture, Japan
- Coordinates: 37.805174°N 140.518620°E
- Status: Defunct
- Opened: 1973
- Closed: 1999
- Owner: Nankai Kogyo Co., Ltd. (Formerly) KSC Co. Ltd

Attractions
- Total: ~12
- Roller coasters: 2

Takakonuma Greenland (Japanese: 高子沼グリーンランド, Hepburn: Takakonuma Gurīnrando) was an amusement park near Date, Fukushima, Japan. It opened in 1973 but temporarily closed a few years later. It reopened in 1982 before permanently closing in 1999, the park was left abandoned until it was demolished between 2006 and 2007, the park has become an Urban Legend due to its apparent isolation and sometimes misty conditions.

== History ==
The park opened in 1973 as Takakonuma Family Park Co., Ltd. but closed after only a few years of operating.

The park was reopened as Takakonuma Greenland Co., Ltd. on April 2, 1982, the business rights were acquired by KSC Co. Ltd (then Sagawa Reizo Co., Ltd.) in May 1988, and fully in July 1992

The park permanently closed in October 1999 due to poor attendance and deteriorating facilities, the park lay abandoned for several years, before it was demolished after 2006.

Solar Panels were installed on the site in 2014

== Attractions ==
The park was notable for being Fukushima Prefecture's first and largest amusement park and contained several rides.

- Ferris Wheel
- Adventure Coaster, a steel terrain coaster manufactured by Hoei Sangyo
- Bobster, a mini steel rollercoaster manufactured by TOGO
- Flying Elephants
- Go Karts
- Sky Cycle
- Twin Dragon
- Enterprise
- Merry-go-Round
- Haunted House
- Miniature Railway

Other attractions included an ice skating rink, game corner, Petting Zoo and Insect Museum.

== Popular culture ==
The park was used as a location in the film Kamen Rider 555: Paradise Lost.

The park appears in the Opening of the Original video animation "FREEDOM".

The Park has become a popular Urban Legend and Creepypasta, with several of these stories claiming the parks location is undisclosed and isolated and that the park experienced several fatalities.
