= TOGO =

Former Japanese amusement ride company

- Native name: Toyo Goraku Ki Kabushiki Kaisha
- Formerly: Toyo Gorakuki
- Industry: Amusement rides
- Founded: 1935
- Founder: Teiichi Yamada
- Defunct: July 2001
- Fate: Bankruptcy
- Area served: Worldwide (Excluding Western Hemisphere)
- Products: Roller coasters
- Website: tohgo.co.jp

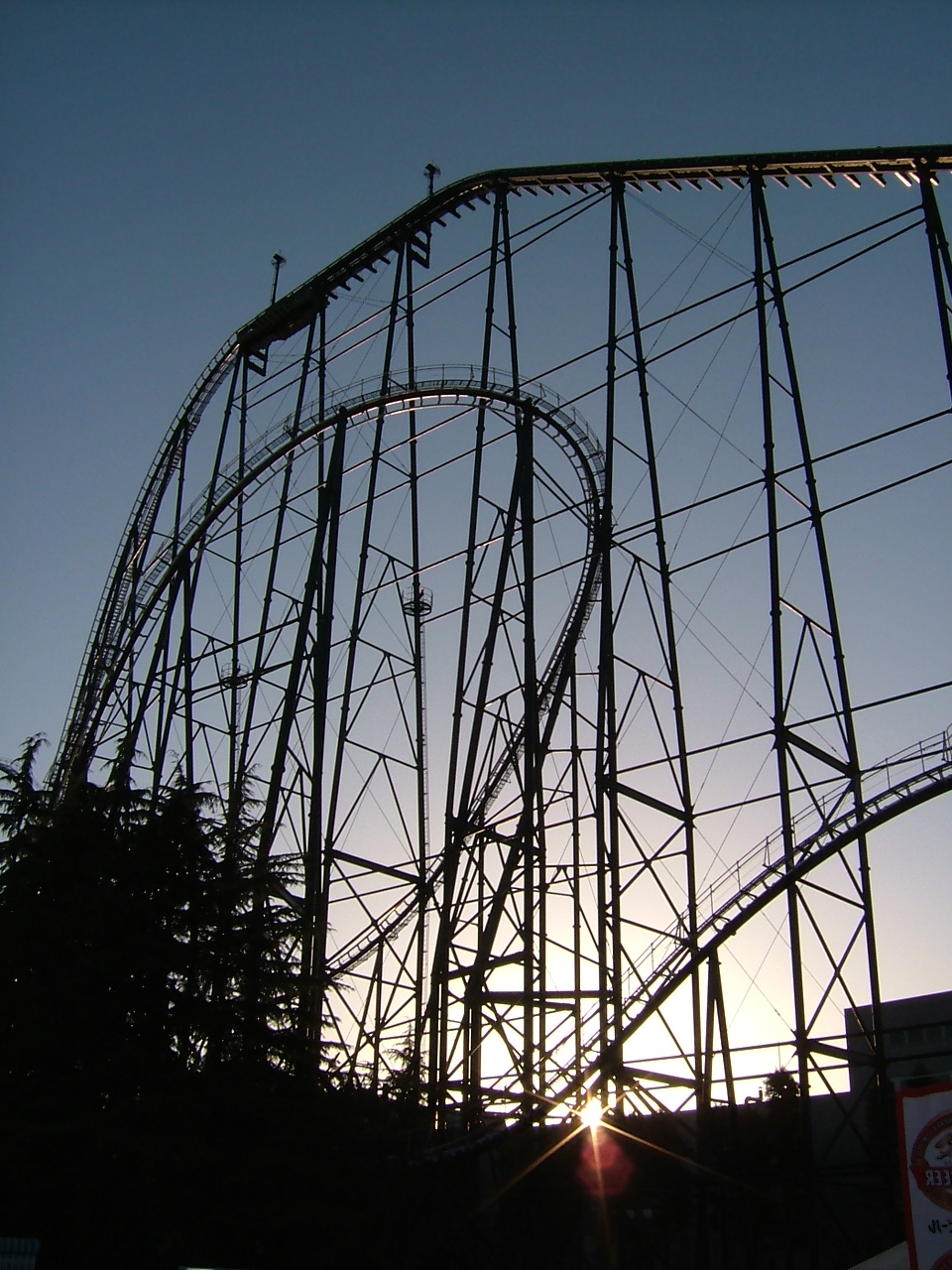
Fujiyama, a TOGO hypercoaster

TOGO (株式会社トーゴ, Kabushiki-gaisha Tōgo) was a Japanese amusement ride company that built roller coasters, giant wheels, carousels, flumes, dark rides, sky cycles and other amusement rides. They also introduced the Whac-A-Mole arcade game in 1975.

== History ==
In 1935, Teiichi Yamada founded the Toyo Gorakuki Company and built his first attraction, a five-foot mechanical walking elephant that was a popular attraction at one of Tokyo's neighborhood parks. Yamada reorganized his company in 1949 and changed the name to TOGO. TOGO built its first roller coaster in 1953, at Hanayashiki Park in Tokyo. That coaster is still in operation and is the oldest coaster in Japan.

In 1965, TOGO built Cyclone at Toshimaen Park, which at the time, was the largest coaster in Asia. The company also began to expand its export business, selling coasters in Russia, Cuba and China. Although the company built a variety of different rides in Japan, its export business was primarily roller coasters. In 1979, TOGO installed standup trains on two of its existing coasters in Japan, Momonga Standing and Loop Coaster at Yomiuriland and Dangai at Thrill Valley, creating the world's first stand-up roller coasters. These two installations captured the attention of Taft/Kings Entertainment company, who then purchased TOGO's Astro-Comet, the world's first coaster designed from the ground up as a stand-up roller coaster, installing at Kings Island as King Cobra.

Whac-A-Mole (Mogura Taiji) was invented in 1975 by Kazuo Yamada of TOGO, based on ten of the designer's pencil sketches from 1974. TOGO released it as Mogura Taiji to Japanese amusement arcades in 1975. It became a major commercial success in Japan, where it was the second highest-grossing electro-mechanical arcade game of 1976 and again in 1977, second only to Namco's popular arcade racing game F-1 in both years.

In 1986, TOGO developed the Ultra Twister Coaster. This unique concept had rails on the side of the vehicle allowing the coaster to perform true heartline rolls as it navigated the course. TOGO also incorporated a vertical lift hill and near-vertical drop into the ride. TOGO built seven of these models, all similar, but not identical to each other. The original versions were not capable of making turns, so all seven operated as shuttles. However, TOGO did display a full-circuit model at the IAAPA trade show in the mid-1990s that was capable of making turns, but the ride was never built. In fall 1989, Arrow Dynamics began building a similar concept called the Pipeline, which failed to get past the prototype stage.

TOGO went bankrupt in 2001 due to a lawsuit by Knott's Berry Farm for problems with their Windjammer Surf Racers roller coaster. TOGO created several unique coasters, including its combination of a looping sit-down coaster and a hypercoaster with its Manhattan Express coaster in Las Vegas (now known as "The Big Apple Coaster"). The looping wild mouse by TOGO was a style of ride with a drop into a vertical loop, followed by the hairpin turns and drops of a wild mouse coaster. The former Windjammer coaster at Knott's berry Farm was a variation of the looping wild mouse; it didn't feature any hairpin turns.

TOGO is also renowned for inventing the Twist-and-Dive roll, an inversion maneuver that combines elements of a half-heartline roll with a half-loop. A version of this maneuver included a half-oblique loop instead of a half-loop, so riders exited the element at an angle. This was used on the now-defunct Viper at Six Flags Great Adventure.

In 2018, TOGO announced a possible comeback after releasing a concept of their new stand up coaster model.

== Notable rides ==
- Bandit at Yomiuriland – It was the tallest and fastest roller coaster in the world when it opened in 1988 and inspired Richard Kinzel of Cedar Point to build Magnum XL 200.
- Big Apple Coaster at New York-New York Hotel & Casino (first opened in 1997 as the "Manhattan Express").
- Freestyle is the only stand-up roller coaster in Europe, operating at Cavallino Matto in Tuscany, Italy. It opened as the park's fifth roller coaster on 18 July 2015. Freestyle originally opened at Canada's Wonderland in 1985 as SkyRider
- Fujiyama – A hypercoaster at Fuji-Q Highland, Japan. Until 2000, it was the tallest roller coaster in the world.
- King Cobra at Kings Island (1984–2001) – The world's first coaster designed specifically to be a stand-up looping coaster. It was taken down and scrapped after TOGO went out of business, making parts very expensive.
- Shockwave – Kings Dominion, Doswell, Virginia. Built in 1986 Specifically for Kings Dominion; was retired August 9, 2015.
- SkyRider – Canada's Wonderland Opening date May 1985; retired in 2014; dismantled and sent to Italy.
- Ultra Twister – A pipeline roller coaster that uses single cars that ride between the rails. Because of the design, the cars are unable to make lateral turns and require switch tracks at either end of the ride.
- Viper at Six Flags Great Adventure – A roller coaster that featured a unique heartline roll. The ride was scrapped in 2005, and its station was re-used for El Toro.
- White Canyon at Yomiuriland – White Canyon was the tallest and longest Cyclone-style roller coaster in the world before it closed in 2013.
- Windjammer Surf Racers at Knott's Berry Farm – a twin racing coaster with 65-foot vertical loops. This coaster was a massive failure, and part of the lawsuits would lead to TOGO's bankruptcy.

== List of roller coasters ==
As of 2019, TOGO has built 61 roller coasters around the world.

Name	Model	Park	Country	Opened	Status	Ref
Jet Coaster	Sitdown Coaster	Nagashima Spa Land	Japan	1966	Operating	
Diving Shooter	Sitdown Coaster	Itozu No Mori Park	Japan	Unknown	Removed	
Cycle Coaster	Cycle Coaster	Enakyo Wonderland	Japan	Unknown	Operating	
Jet Coaster	Sitdown Coaster	Kagoshima Jungle Land	Japan	Unknown	Removed	
Crazy Mouse	Looping Mouse II	Kagoshima Jungle Land	Japan	Unknown	Removed	
Jungle Mouse	Wild Mouse Coaster	Yoshinogawa Yuenchi	Japan	Unknown	Removed	
Rushing Car	Rushing Car	Tokyo Summer Land	Japan	Unknown	Removed	
Rushing Car	Rushing Car	Tengu Land	Japan	Unknown	Removed	
Rushing Car	Rushing Car	Odakyu Mukogaoka Yuen	Japan	Unknown	Removed	
Rushing Car	Wild Mouse Coaster	Kashiikaen Yuenchi	Japan	Unknown	Removed	
Unknown; Formerly Ultra Twister	Ultra Twister I	Six Flags America; Six Flags AstroWorld; Six Flags Great Adventure	United States	Unknown; 1990 to 2005; 1986 to 1988	Removed	
Roller Coaster	Sitdown Coaster	Hanayashiki	Japan	1953	Operating	
Sea Coaster	Sitdown Coaster	Yatsu Yuenchi	Japan	1958	Removed	
Cyclone	Sitdown Coaster	Toshimaen	Japan	1965	Removed	
2WAY Coaster	Sitdown Coaster	Tokyo Dome City	Japan	1968	Removed	
Diving Coaster	Sitdown Coaster	GrinPa	Japan	1973	Removed	
Bobster	Bobster	Takakonuma Greenland	Japan	1973	Removed	
Momonga Standing and Loop Coaster; Formerly Standing and Loop Coaster	Standing Coaster Astro Comet II	Yomiuriland	Japan	1979	Removed	
Crazy Mouse	Looping Mouse II	Tobu Zoo Park	Japan	1981	Removed	
Bobster	Bobster	Shirakaba Resort Family Land; Nakajima Park	Japan	1982; 1974 to 1981	Operating	
King Cobra	Standing Coaster Astro Comet	Kings Island	United States	1984	Removed	
Standing Coaster	Standing Coaster Astro Comet II	Rusutsu Resort; Otaru Expo	Japan	1985; 1984	Operating	
Adventure Coaster	Diving Shooter	Odakyu Mukogaoka Yuen	Japan	1985	Removed	
Montaña Rusa	Bobster	Parque Lenin	Cuba	1985	Removed	
Shockwave	Standing Coaster Custom	Kings Dominion	United States	1986	Removed	
Pink Typhoon Standing Coaster; Formerly Star Jet	Standing Coaster Astro Comet	Brazilian Park Washuzan Highland; Tsukuba Expo	Japan	1986; 1985	Operating	
Ultra Twister	Ultra Twister I	Tokyo Dome City	Japan	1986	Removed	
Loop Screw Coaster	Sitdown Coaster	Seibuen Yuenchi	Japan	1986	Removed	
Roller Coaster	Loop & Corkscrew	Beijing Amusement Park	China	1987	Removed	
Bandit	Super Roller Coaster	Yomiuriland	Japan	1988	Operating	
SL Coaster	Sitdown Coaster	Yomiuriland	Japan	1988	Removed	
Zola 7	Shooting Coaster	Fuji-Q Highland	Japan	1988	Removed	
Ultra Twister	Ultra Twister I	Nagashima Spa Land	Japan	1989	Operating	
SL Coaster	Sitdown Coaster	Minamichita Beach Land & Minamichita Toy Kingdom	Japan	1989	Removed	
Dangai	Standing Coaster Custom	Thrill Valley	Japan	1989	Removed	
Super Roller Coaster	Sitdown Coaster	Fantasy Dome Tomakomai	Japan	1990	Removed	
Milky Way; Formerly Fujin-Raijin; Formerly Ultra Twin; Formerly Fujin-Raijin	Standing Coaster Custom	Greenland; International Flower and Greenery Exposition	Japan	1991; 1990	Operating	
Ultra Twister	Ultra Twister I	Brazilian Park Washuzan Highland	Japan	1991	Operating	
Fujin Raijin II	Standing Coaster Custom	Expoland	Japan	1992	Removed	
Geopanic	Sitdown Coaster	Tokyo Dome City	Japan	1992	Removed	
DIOS	Super Roller Coaster	Odakyu Mukogaoka Yuen	Japan	1992	Removed	
Aladdin Coaster	Sitdown Coaster	Alibaba City	Japan	1992	Removed	
Surf Coaster Leviathan; Formerly Surf Coaster	Super Roller Coaster	Sea Paradise	Japan	1993	Operating	
Ultra Twister	Ultra Twister S-II	Rusutsu Resort; World Food Festival	Japan	1989; 1988	Operating	
Unknown	Sitdown Coaster	Fantasy Dome Seiro	Japan	1994	Removed	
Vegas Panic	Looping Mouse Custom	Fantasy Dome Kishiwada	Japan	1994	Removed	
Ultra Twister Megaton	Ultra Twister I	Greenland	Japan	1994	Removed	
White Canyon	Wooden Coaster	Yomiuriland	Japan	1994	Removed	
Clipper	Sitdown Coaster	Space World	Japan	1995	Removed	
Viper	Mega Coaster	Six Flags Great Adventure	United States	1995	Removed	
Fujiyama	Sitdown Coaster	Fuji-Q Highland	Japan	1996	Operating	
Mega Coaster	Mega Coaster	Hamanako Pal Pal	Japan	1997	Operating	
Big Apple Coaster; Formerly The Roller Coaster; Formerly Manhattan Express	Mega Coaster	New York, New York Hotel & Casino	United States	1997	Operating	
Windjammer Surf Racers; Formerly Jammer	Looping Mouse Custom	Knott's Berry Farm	United States	1997	Removed	
Kiddy Shuttle	Kiddy Shuttle	Thrill Valley	Japan	1998	Removed	
Crazy Mouse	Looping Mouse II	Kitami Family Land	Japan	2000	Operating	
Hyper Kid Coaster	Sitdown Coaster	Fantasy Dome	Japan	2000	Closed	
Flounder's Flying Fish Coaster	Sitdown Coaster	Tokyo DisneySea	Japan	2001	Operating	
Actpo Kometa	Sitdown Coaster	Maviland; Metalworkers' Palace	Russia	2002; 1992 to 2000	Removed	
Go Go Sneaker	Sitdown Coaster	Rusutsu Resort; Kintetsu Ayameike	Japan	2005; Unknown	Operating	
Hurricane - Screw & Loop Coaster; Formerly Tornado	Loop & Corkscrew	Himeji Central Park; Kintetsu Ayameike	Japan	2007; 1981 to 2004	Operating	
Ultra Coaster; Formerly Ultra Twister	Ultra Twister I	Marah Land Sabahiya; Ikoma Skyland	Kuwait	2008; 2004 to 2006	Removed	
Bledek Coaster; Formerly Loop & Cork	Looping Mouse I	Suroboyo Carnival Night Market; Jawa Timur Park 2 Maruyama KidLand; Nakajima Park	Indonesia	2014; Unknown; 1995 to 2010; 1982 to 1994	Removed	
Grand Canyon; Formerly Cobra; Formerly Kiddy Shuttle	Kiddy Shuttle	Parc de la Vallée; Lunapark Fréjus; Odakyu Mukogaoka Yuen	France	2014; 2004 to 2011; 1998 to 2002	Operating	
Freestyle; Formerly SkyRider	Standing Coaster Astro Comet	Cavallino Matto; Canada's Wonderland	Italy	2015; 1985 to 2014	Operating	
