= Yomiuri Giants Stadium =

Baseball stadium in Kawasaki, Japan

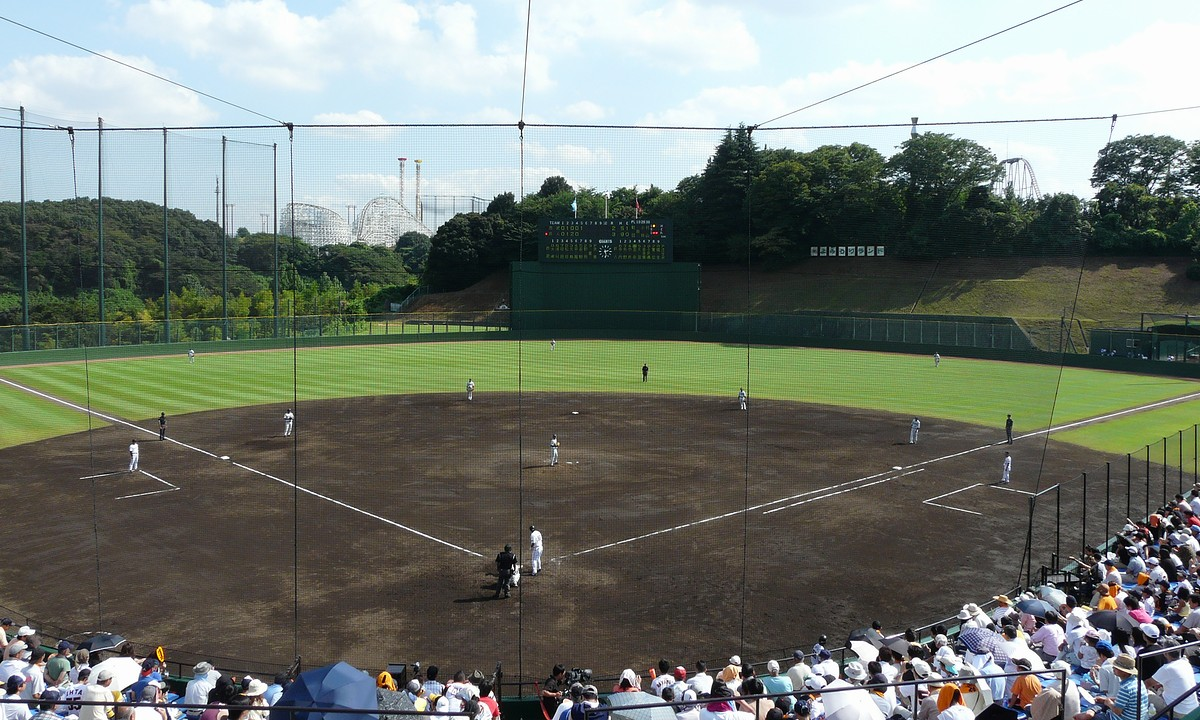
- Interactive map of Yomiuri Giants Stadium
- Location: Kawasaki, Kanagawa
- Coordinates: 35.629793°N 139.519375°E
- Owner: Yomiuriland
- Operator: Yomiuri Giants
- Capacity: 4,000
- Surface: Grass
- Field size: Right, Left: 97.6 m Center: 121.9 m

Construction
- Opened: 1985

Tenant
- Yomiuri Giants

Yomiuri Giants Stadium is a baseball stadium in Kawasaki, Kanagawa, Japan. The stadium, which holds 4,000 people, also serves as the training home of the Yomiuri Giants.

The stadium is located within the Yomiuriland Amusement Park, and can be accessed by the Keiō-Yomiuriland Station or the Yomiuriland-mae Station.

== See also ==
- Giants Town Stadium
