= Big Apple Coaster =

Roller coaster in Paradise, Nevada

- Previously known as Manhattan Express (1997–2006); The Roller Coaster (2007–2015)
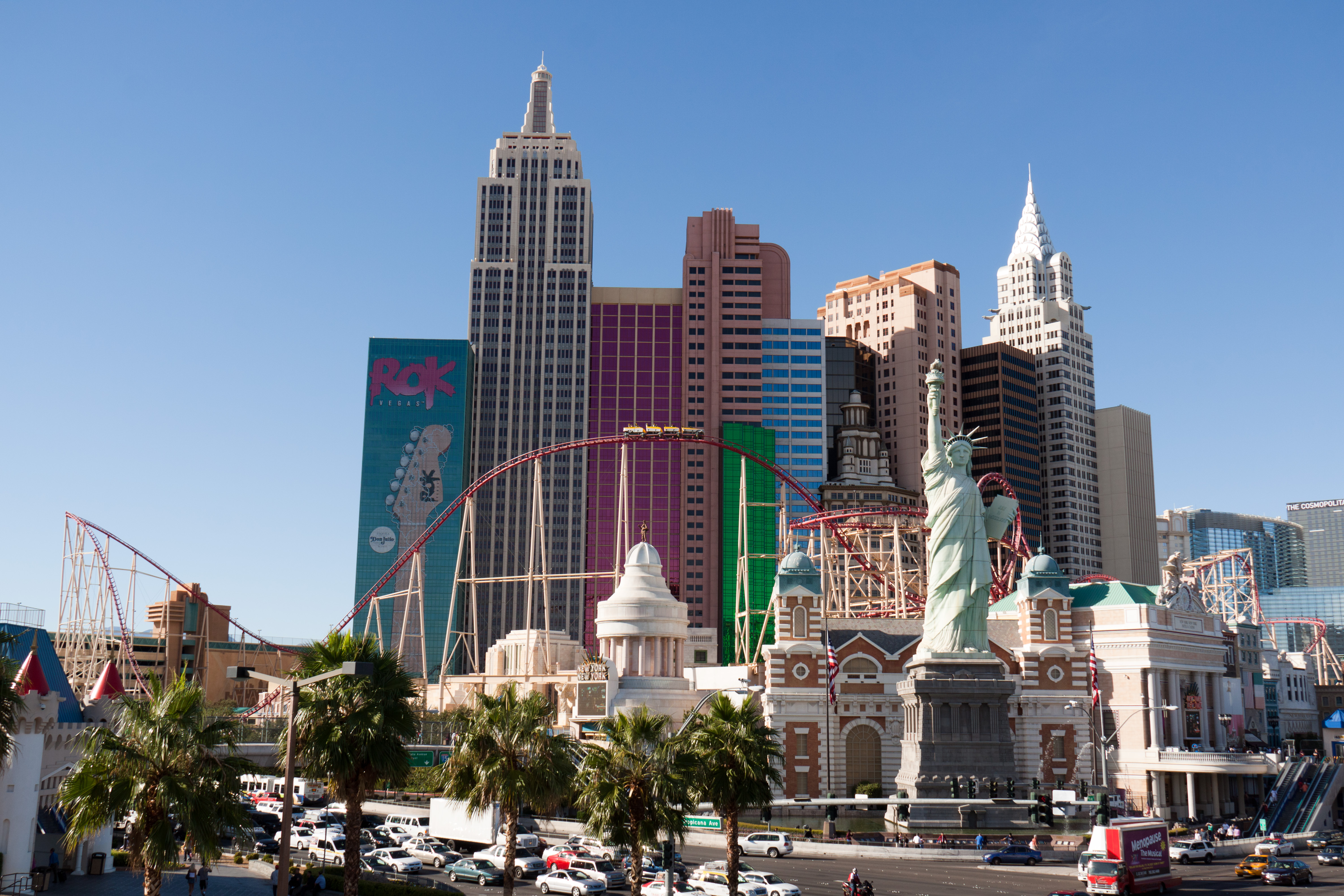
- The Big Apple Coaster and the New York-New York Hotel & Casino

New York-New York Hotel and Casino
- Location: New York-New York Hotel and Casino
- Coordinates: 36°6′7″N 115°10′25″W
- Status: Operating
- Opening date: January 3, 1997; 29 years ago
- Cost: $25 million

General statistics
- Type: Steel
- Manufacturer: TOGO
- Designer: TOGO
- Model: Sitdown Looping
- Track layout: Custom
- Lift/launch system: Chain lift
- Height: 203 ft (62 m)
- Drop: 144 ft (44 m)
- Length: 4,777 ft (1,456 m)
- Speed: 67 mph (108 km/h)
- Inversions: 2
- Duration: 2:40
- Max vertical angle: 55°
- Height restriction: 54 in (137 cm)
- Trains: 5 trains with 3 cars; riders arranged 2 across in 3 rows for a total of 18 riders per train
- Big Apple Coaster at RCDB

The Big Apple Coaster (formerly Manhattan Express and The Roller Coaster) is a steel roller coaster at the New York-New York Hotel and Casino on the Las Vegas Strip in Paradise, Nevada, United States. The ride's trains are themed to New York City taxicabs. Opened on January 3, 1997, it is the only roller coaster by Japanese roller coaster manufacturer TOGO still operating in North America. The ride travels on a 4,777 ft (1,456 m) track. It contains a 180-foot (55 m) lift hill and a 76-foot (23 m) first drop, followed by a hill and another 144-foot (44 m) drop. The ride also has two inversions: a standard vertical loop and a dive loop.

The ride was constructed as part of the New York-New York Hotel and Casino, which was developed by MGM and Primadonna Resorts. Completed at a cost of $18 million, the coaster was known as Manhattan Express when it opened along with the resort on January 3, 1997. In the months after the ride opened, Clark County building officials shut it down several times over safety issues, and many of the ride's steel tension rods had to be replaced. After some modifications by Premier Rides in the mid-2000s, the Manhattan Express was renamed The Roller Coaster in 2007 before being renamed the Big Apple Coaster in 2013. The ride introduced a virtual reality option in 2018, and Premier Rides provided new trains featuring softer vest restraints in 2021.

== History ==
=== Opening and early years ===
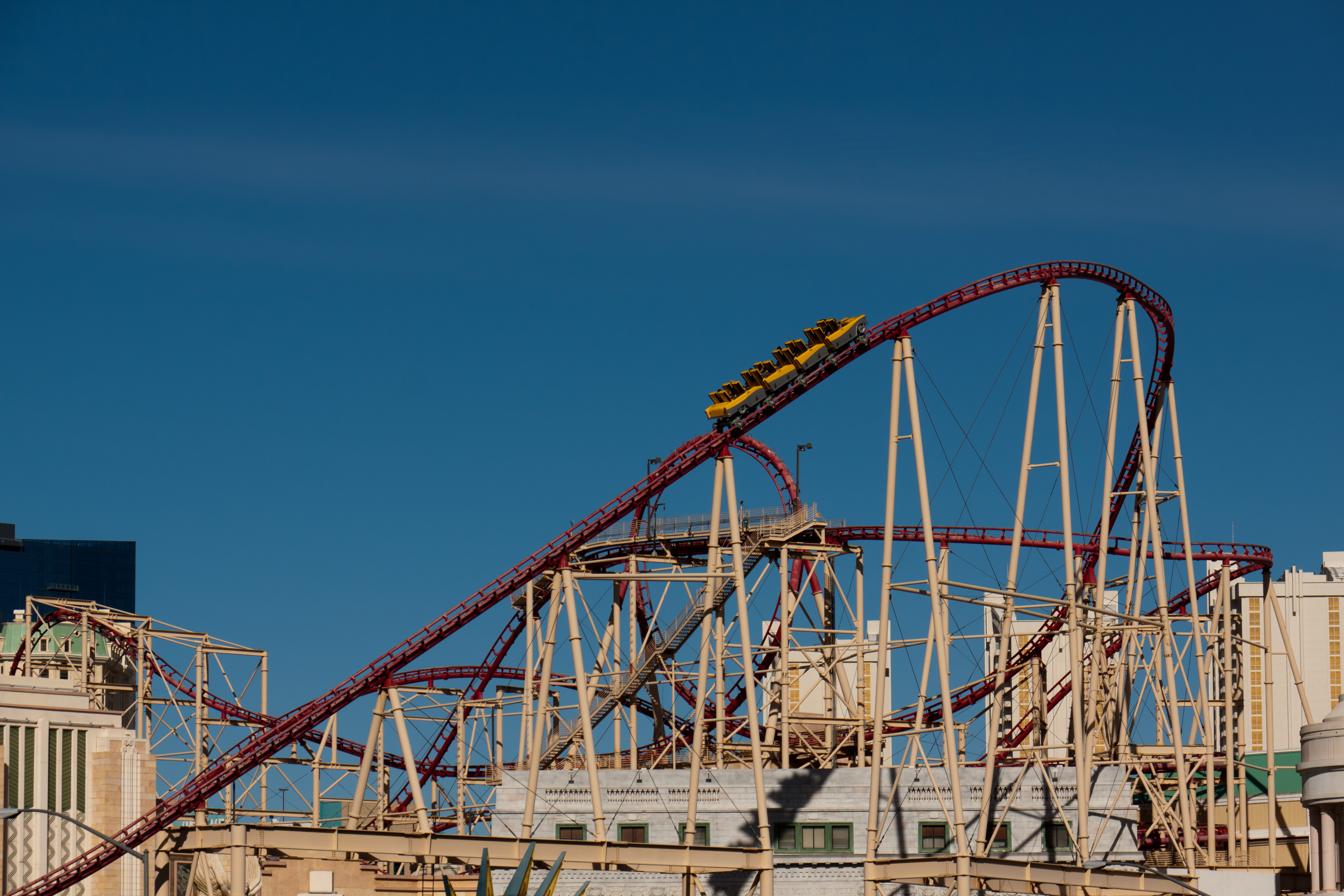
View of the Big Apple Coaster on the roof of the New York-New York casino

The ride, originally called the Manhattan Express, was built by Japanese roller coaster manufacturer TOGO. It was one of only two roller coasters in the world to feature a heartline roll into a dive when it opened. The ride was conceived by Gary Primm, owner of Primadonna Resorts, which co-developed New York-New York. When groundbreaking ceremonies for New York-New York occurred in March 1995, a 180-foot-tall coaster was planned to be built along with the resort. The Elko Daily Free Press described the ride as a "Coney Island-style roller coaster", complementing the resort's replicas of major New York City attractions such as the Empire State Building, the Brooklyn Bridge, and the Statue of Liberty. The ride cost $18 million to build, and it opened along with New York-New York on January 3, 1997.

Within two months of its opening, 500,000 people had ridden the Manhattan Express. In March 1997, Clark County building officials shut down the Manhattan Express over safety issues, which the resort had failed to report to the county. Clark County officials issued five summonses to the resort's owners for violations of county building codes. The ride contained 250 steel tension rods, of which approximately 40 had snapped. The resort was cited for continuing to operate the ride despite the breakages. Repairs were made, but the ride reopened and closed several times that month as more rods broke. The initial 40 broken rods had been replaced using stronger material, which strained the weaker rods and caused them to snap. The strain also created fine cracks in the coaster track.

The Manhattan Express reopened in April 1997, after two weeks of repairs and safety improvements. Further rod breakages occurred on several occasions later in the year. The rods were repaired as they broke, and the county deemed the ride safe despite the frequent breakages. By July 1997, the Manhattan Express had been closed for repairs at least eight times. The coaster had its one-millionth rider the same month. Ultimately, the resort had to replace 175 of the rods with steel tension cables. All except 50 of the rods had been replaced by September 1998. By then, problems with the coaster had decreased significantly, though broken rods were still being reported. According to Ron Lynn of the Clark County building department, the coaster was still safe to ride, even as three faulty rods were being replaced every week.

=== Renaming and modifications ===
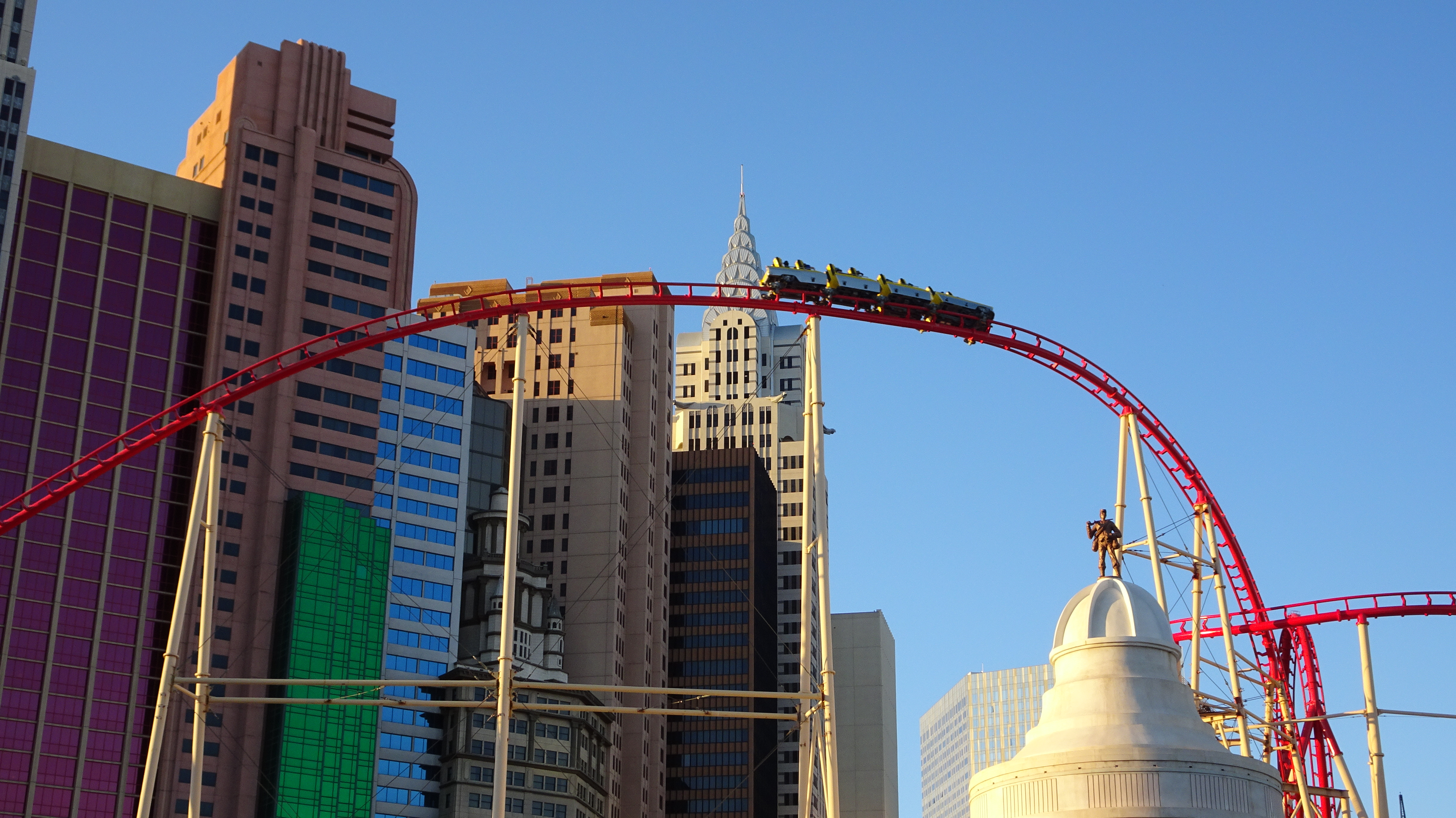
The coaster in 2019, seen in front of a fake New York City skyline

Over the years, the Big Apple Coaster gained a reputation for being a rough roller coaster. The original TOGO trains used over-the-shoulder restraints, which many guests reported were uncomfortable. In addition, the track layout placed high amounts of lateral forces on guests. In 2004, Premier Rides installed magnetic brakes on the ride; by then, TOGO had gone out of business. In August 2006, Premier also installed new trains to replace the original TOGO trains. After the Premier trains were installed, the ride became noticeably smoother, compared to when the TOGO trains were in use. The ride was renamed The Roller Coaster in 2007, and it was again renamed in 2013, becoming the Big Apple Coaster.

In February 2018, the ride's operator introduced a virtual reality coaster option, designed by VR Coaster. Riders could pay an additional fee to wear a virtual-reality headset on the ride. The headsets contained 3D footage of aliens being chased through the Nevada desert and into the skyline of New York City.

As of 2021, the Big Apple Express is the only roller coaster by TOGO still operating in North America. For the 2021 season, the ride received another set of new trains from Premier Rides. These consist of more open-air seating and can hold up to 18 riders, thus increasing the coaster's capacity. Testing began in December 2020, with the ride slated to reopen in February 2021. An accident occurred in mid-December, where the middle car of one of the new trains derailed on the lift hill, causing severe damage to part of the catwalk. The ride reopened on January 30, 2021. The newer trains contain lighter restraints that exert less pressure on riders' shoulders.

== Characteristics ==
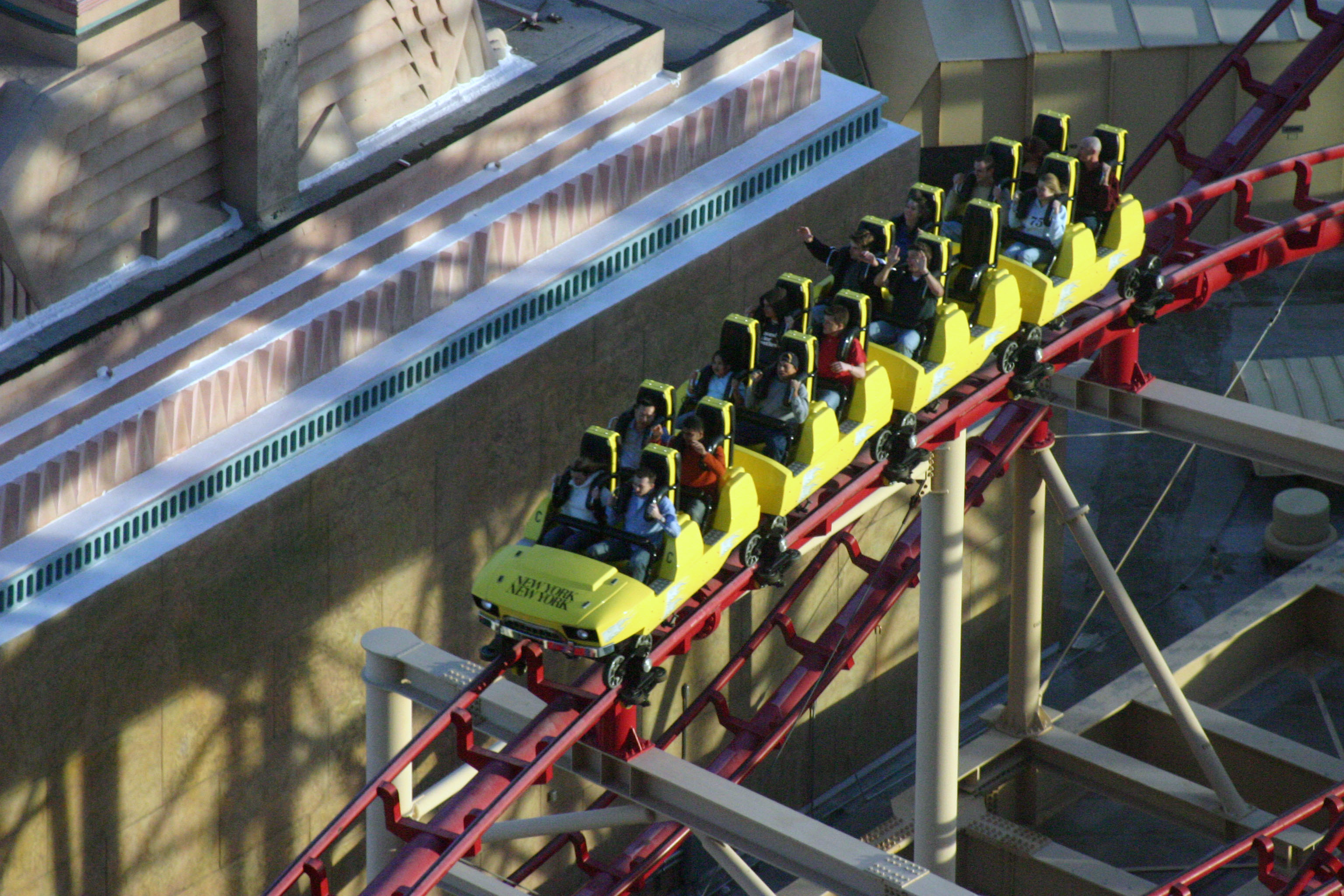
The original TOGO-built train in 2005, which has since been replaced with a new train set built by Premier Rides.

The ride travels on a 4,777 ft (1,456 m) track. It contains a 180-foot (55 m) lift hill and a 76-foot (23 m) first drop, followed by a hill and another 144-foot (44 m) drop. The ride also has two inversions: a standard vertical loop and a dive loop (twist and dive element), where the train performs a 180-degree twist and then performs a half-loop. In 2011 The New York Times wrote that the ride was "designed to simulate the barrel roll a pilot feels inside a jet fighter". The ride's station is themed to a New York City Subway station.

The coaster's computer system could adjust the ride based on the arid climate of the area. The system could modify the train's speed at the top of the lift hill, and it could also activate the mid-course brake run to slow down a speeding train. When wind speeds are excessively high, the computer system notifies the ride's technicians.

As of 2026, the ride costs $25 per individual ticket. Las Vegas residents with valid ID and military personnel also receive discounts. The New York-New York Hotel and Casino allows guests to get married on the Big Apple Coaster. When the ride opened, riders had to be at least 46 inches (120 cm) tall; this height restriction has since been increased to 54 inches (140 cm).

== Ride experience ==
The ride begins with a left-hand, 135-degree turn out of the station which then begins to climb the chain lift hill. After reaching the peak, the train turns 45 degrees left into the first, 76-foot drop, crossing over the New York-New York's driveway. The train then ascends a hill that curves left into the second, 144-foot drop, next to the New York-New York's entrance. The train ascends another hill and curves left again onto the roof of the casino, dropping slightly to enter a vertical loop. Immediately afterward, the train twists to the right and enters the dive loop. Exiting the dive loop, the train ascends into a hill with a mid-course brake run, then turns 180 degrees to the left, ascending an airtime hill. The train turns 180 degrees to the right, dips into two airtime hills, and traverses a 540-degree helix to the right, traveling through one last airtime hill before hitting the final brake run. The ride then travels indoors above a replica of Little Italy, Manhattan, on a structure that resembles an old elevated railway.

== Critical reception ==
When the Manhattan Express opened in 1997, the Las Vegas Review-Journal said that the "unmistakable Las Vegas mystique" gave the "Manhattan Express a unique appeal". A reporter for The Boston Globe wrote that many of the early riders seemed to have "enjoyed this coaster immensely". Paul Goldberger of The New York Times wrote that the ride looked "like a rope that has been used to capture [New York City's] landmarks and hold them hostage, a mirage of the New York skyline in the desert." Conversely, the website TripSavvy wrote that the Big Apple Coaster was rough, saying: "Instead of doubling the fun, The Big Apple’s hypercoaster heights and looping inversion elements cancel each other out—and cause some pain to boot."

The Los Angeles Times said of the virtual-reality option: "The VR experience does a fairly accurate job of rendering the Vegas Strip, but non-MGM properties get short shrift." Among the issues were that the site of the Tropicana Las Vegas was rendered as a parking lot and that the Vegas Vic neon sign was incorrectly shown as being at Harry Reid International Airport.
