= Cavallino Matto =

Amusement park in Tuscany, Italy

- Interactive map of Cavallino Matto
- Location: Marina di Castagneto Carducci, Tuscany, Italy
- Coordinates: 43°10′53″N 10°32′55″E
- Opened: 1967
- Owner: Manfredini's Family
- Operating season: Spring-Summer & Holidays
- Area: ~ 60.000 m2

Attractions
- Total: 30
- Roller coasters: 5
- Water rides: 3
- Website: official web-site

Cavallino Matto is the largest amusement park in Tuscany. The park, the name of which means "Crazy Horse" in Italian, is located on 60,000 square metres of pine forest in Marina di Castagneto Carducci, Province of Livorno, and includes rides and dining facilities.

== History ==
The park began as a free playground in 1967. Called "Parco Gulliver" (Gulliver Park), it was expanded in the 1990s with amusement park rides and renamed. Additional rides were added in 2001. In February 2006, the Manfredi family bought the park and renovated it with a number of new attractions, including live shows.

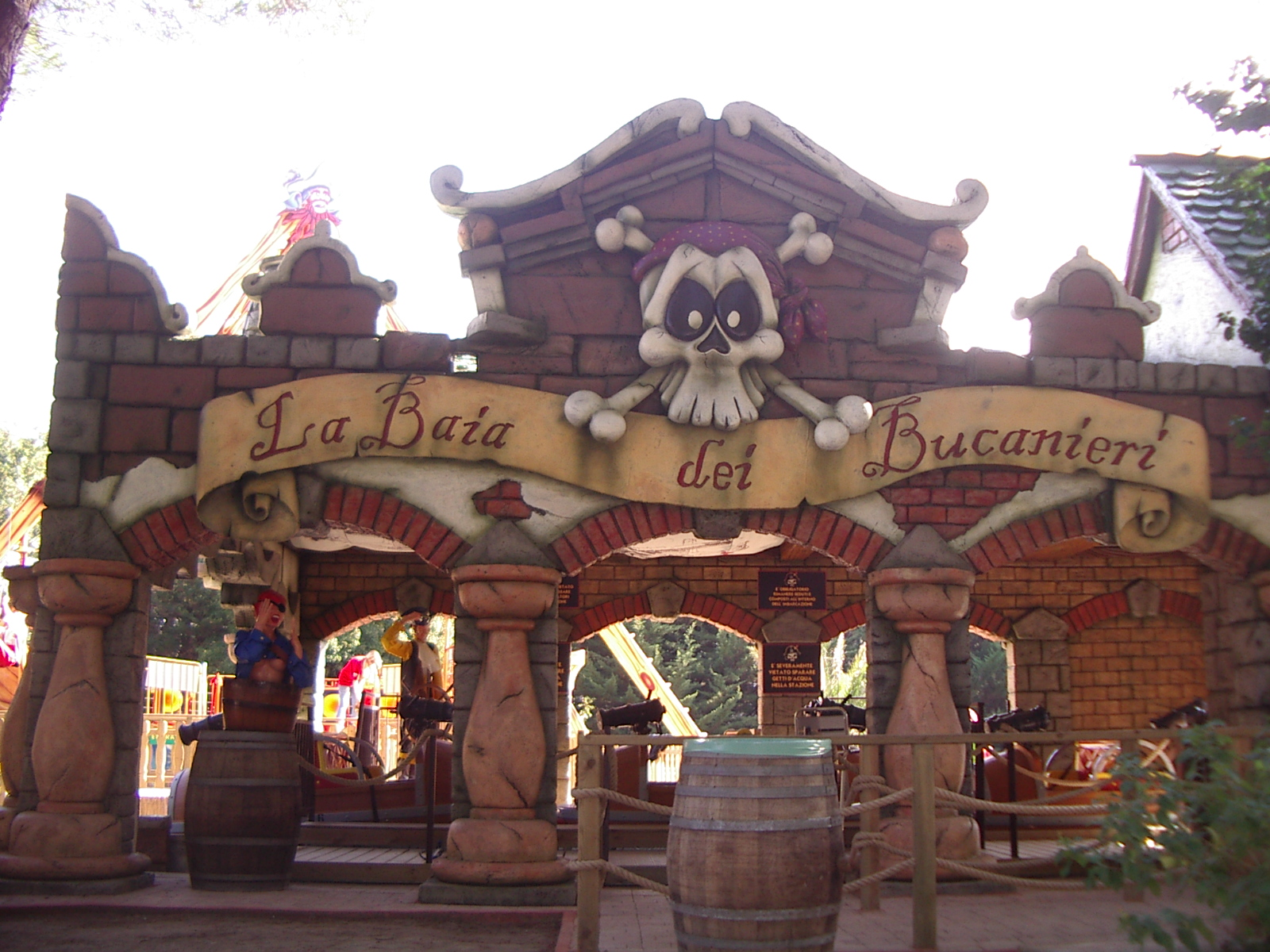
Baia dei Bucanieri

== Rides ==
The park currently operates five roller coasters, "Freestyle", "Project 1", "Speedy Gonzales", "Topozorro" and "Wild Mine". Other attractions include the Baia dei Bucanieri, a ride that opened in 2007 that features water cannons for the passengers, and "Safari Adventure", a safari ride featuring animatronic animals. Shows include the 3D cinema "Movie Stars Theatre" as well as live performances by acrobats and orchestras.

=== Roller coasters ===
Name	Year opened	Type	Manufacturer/Model	Comments
Freestyle	2015	Stand-up roller coaster	TOGO	Operated as SkyRider at Canada's Wonderland from 1985 to 2014.
Jurassic River	2018	Water coaster	Technical Park	Includes two lift hills and gravity-powered coaster sections.
Project 1	2006	Compact Coaster	L&T Systems	Previously travelled the Italian fair circuit with the Manfredini family. The track was eventually repainted from blue to green.
Speedy Gonzales	2003	Junior coaster	L&T Systems	
Topo Zorro	2007	Junior coaster	S.D.C.	Big Apple/Wacky Worm layout coaster.
Wild Mine	1997	Wild mouse	L&T Systems	Was originally located where Project 1 now sits. L&T Systems once proposed a spinning coaster car to be included on the attraction.
