= White Canyon (roller coaster) =

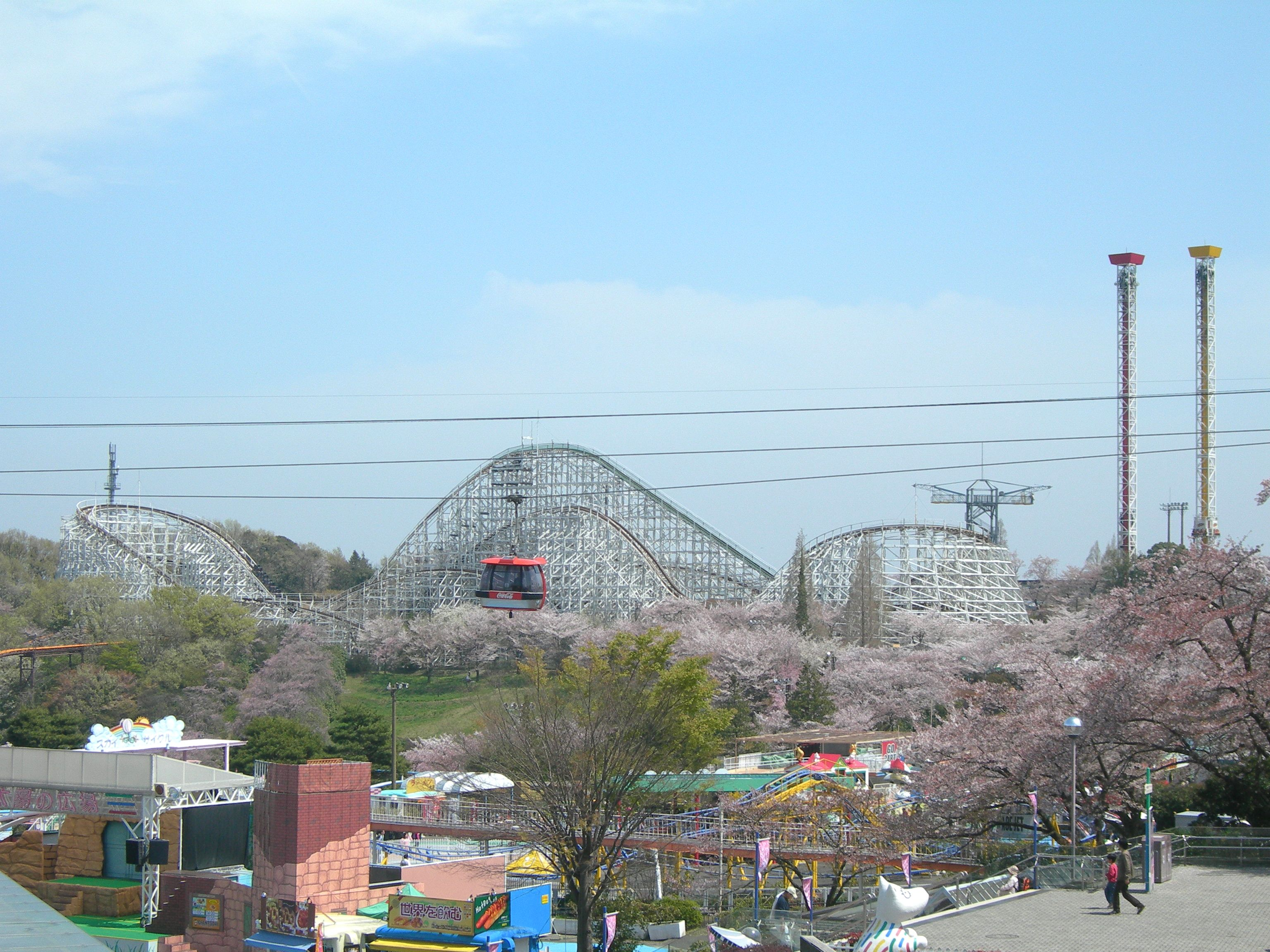
- White Canyon at Yomiuriland

Yomiuriland
- Location: Yomiuriland
- Coordinates: 35.625765°N 139.521355°E
- Status: Removed
- Opening date: April 9, 1994
- Closing date: January 14, 2013

General statistics
- Type: Wood
- Manufacturer: TOGO
- Designer: John Pierce Associates; Roller Coaster Corporation of America; D. H. Morgan Manufacturing
- Track layout: Cyclone
- Height: 116 ft (35 m)
- Drop: 95 ft (29 m)
- Length: 3,608.9 ft (1,100.0 m)
- Speed: 52.4 mph (84.3 km/h)
- Inversions: 0
- Duration: 2:12
- Max vertical angle: 53°
- Capacity: 1,008 riders per hour
- G-force: 3.5
- Height restriction: 51 in (130 cm)
- Trains: 2 trains with 7 cars. Riders are arranged 2 across in 2 rows for a total of 28 riders per train.
- White Canyon at RCDB

White Canyon (Japanese: ホワイトキャニオン) was a wooden roller coaster located at Yomiuriland near Inagi, Tokyo, Japan. It was one of the first wooden roller coasters in Japan, and one of the largest Cyclone-style roller coasters in the world.

== History and construction ==
Before White Canyon's construction in 1994, there was only one wooden roller coaster, Jupiter (built in 1992), which had ever been built in Japan. This was largely due to strict, earthquake-related building codes which restricted the height of wooden structures in Japan.

White Canyon was built as a collaboration of Roller Coaster Corporation of America, TOGO, D. H. Morgan Manufacturing, and John Pierce Associates. The coaster was built with 2,360 cubic meters (one million board feet) of southern yellow pine and the construction involved extensive prefabrication in the United States before the components were shipped for final assembly at Yomiuriland.

== Track layout and ride experience ==
The layout of the White Canyon was quite similar to the famous Coney Island Cyclone. Before White Canyon was closed in 2013, it was the longest—1,100 metres (3,600 ft)—and tallest—35 metres (115 ft)—Cyclone-layout roller coaster in the world. The ride produced fairly high lateral G-forces of up to 1.5 lateral Gs.

Before it closed in early 2013, a single ride on the White Cyclone cost ¥900. The ride was restricted to individuals who were above 1.3 metres (4 ft 3 in) in height. It was also restricted to riders under 60 years of age and at least in junior high school.

== Closure ==
White Canyon was closed on January 14, 2013. A total of 5.35 million people rode on White Canyon during its 19 years of operation. In its last year of operation, Yomiuriland organized a "White Canyon Thank You" campaign that involved the planting of thousands of trees. The campaign received funding from several environmental and government organizations.
