= Rusutsu Resort =

Resort in Hokkaidō, Japan

Coordinates: 42.74968°N 140.90329°E

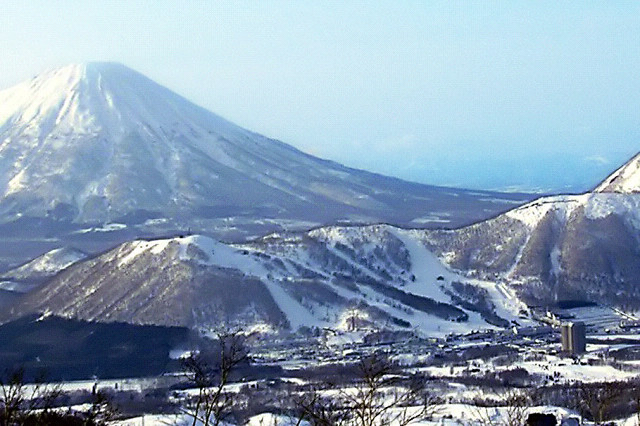
- Interactive map of Rusutsu Resort
- Location: Rusutsu, Hokkaidō, Japan
- Vertical: 594 m (1,949 ft)
- Top elevation: 994 m (3,261 ft)
- Base elevation: 400 m (1,312 ft)
- Skiable area: 2.12 km^{2} (523.9 acres)
- Trails: 37
- Longest run: 3.5 kilometres (2.2 mi)
- Lift system: 19 (4 gondola lifts, 7 quad chairlifts, and 8 pair chairlifts)
- Lift capacity: 30,300 per hour
- Website: http://www.rusutsu.co.jp/

The Rusutsu Resort (ルスツリゾート, Rusutsu Rizōto) is the largest resort in Hokkaidō, Japan, operated by Kamori Kankō. The resort is famous for its ski slopes but also offers year-round attractions including an amusement park and golf courses.

== Ski resort ==
The ski resort extends over three mountains; West Mountain, East Mountain, and Mount Isola. The total number of courses is 37, with a total length of 42 kilometres (26 mi). Rusutsu Resort was the first Japanese ski resort to be awarded Best Small Resort by The Great Skiing & Snowboarding Guide, a British ski magazine. According to a 2003 survey by View Communications, Japanese NPO, skiers ranked the resort as the most satisfying among 48 ski resorts in Japan. Rustsu Resort has won “Japan’s Best Ski Resort” at the World Ski Awards six times since 2017.

=== Courses ===
All slopes allow skiing, snowboarding, and snowscooting.

- Slopes for beginners: 10
- Slopes for intermediate skiers/snowboarders: 12
- Slopes for advanced skiers/snowboarders: 11
- Slopes for very advanced skiers/snowboarders: 4
- Total: 37

=== Aerial lifts ===
Name	Japanese	Length	Max. speed	Capacity		Built
Name	Japanese	Length	Max. speed	per lift	per hour	Built
West Gondola	ウエストゴンドラ	1,104 m (3,622 ft)	4.0 m/s (13.1 ft/s)	4	1,200	November 1983
West 1st Quad	ウエスト第1クワッド	619 m (2,031 ft)	4.0 m/s (13.1 ft/s)	4	2,400	November 1997
West 2nd Quad	ウエスト第2クワッド	924 m (3,031 ft)	4.0 m/s (13.1 ft/s)	4	2,400	November 1994
West Pair Lift	ウエストペアリフト	637 m (2,090 ft)	2.0 m/s (6.6 ft/s)	2	1,048	December 1986
West Tiger Pair Lift	ウエストタイガーペアリフト	512 m (1,680 ft)	2.3 m/s (7.5 ft/s)	2	900	November 2005
East Gondola Line 1	イーストゴンドラ1号線	1,654 m (5,426 ft)	5.0 m/s (16.4 ft/s)	6	1,800	November 1987
East Gondola Line 2	イーストゴンドラ2号線	2,071 m (6,795 ft)	5.0 m/s (16.4 ft/s)	6	1,800	November 1987
East Quad	イーストクワッド	1,381 m (4,531 ft)	4.0 m/s (13.1 ft/s)	4	2,400	December 1987
East 1st Pair Lift	イースト第1ペアリフト	721 m (2,365 ft)	1.6 m/s (5.2 ft/s)	2	1,200	November 1997
East 2nd Pair Lift	イースト第2ペアリフト	810 m (2,657 ft)	2.3 m/s (7.5 ft/s)	2	1,200	November 1995
Tower Pair Lift	タワーペアリフト	1,182 m (3,877 ft)	n/a	2	n/a	2007
Across 1st Pair Lift	アクロス第1ペアリフト	149 m (489 ft)	1.8 m/s (5.9 ft/s)	2	1,200	December 1988
Across 2nd Pair Lift	アクロス第2ペアリフト	n/a	n/a	2	n/a	December 1989
Isola Gondola	イゾラゴンドラ	2,858 m (9,377 ft)	5.0 m/s (16.4 ft/s)	6	1,800	December 1988
Isola 1st Quad	イゾラ第1クワッド	1,732 m (5,682 ft)	4.0 m/s (13.1 ft/s)	4	2,400	December 1989
Isola 2nd Quad	イゾラ第2クワッド	1,421 m (4,662 ft)	4.0 m/s (13.1 ft/s)	4	2,400	November 1990
Isola 3rd Quad	イゾラ第3クワッド	1,660 m (5,446 ft)	4.0 m/s (13.1 ft/s)	4	2,400	December 1995
Isola 4th Quad	イゾラ第4クワッド	1,140 m (3,740 ft)	5.0 m/s (16.4 ft/s)	4	2,400	November 1996
Isola 5th Pair Lift	イゾラ第5ペアリフト	498 m (1,634 ft)	2.3 m/s (7.5 ft/s)	2	1,028	2006

== Amusement park ==
The amusement park offers more than 60 attractions and rides including eight roller coasters, swimming pools, ropes courses, train rides, go karts and other thrill rides.

The operator increased the number of rides by buying discounted facilities from closing amusement parks and local exposition from other parts of Japan and overseas. The outdoor swimming attractions are open in summer vacation season, can be open as short as four weeks from the end of July.

Roller coasters

Year opened	Name	Manufacturer	Type	Design
1983	Corkscrew	Arrow Development	Steel	Sit down
1983	Mountain Jet Coaster	Meisho Amusement Machine	Steel	Sit down
1983	Loop the Loop	Meisho Amusement Machine	Steel	Sit down
1985	Standing Coaster	Togo	Steel	Standing
1989	Ultra Twister	Togo	Steel	Sit down
1996	Hurricane	Vekoma	Steel	Suspended
2003	Mad Mouse	Saeki Kogyo	Steel	Sit down/Kiddie
2005	Go Go Sneaker	Togo	Steel	Sit down/Kiddie

== Golf courses ==
There are four golf courses; Tower Course, Izumikawa Course, River Course, and Wood Course, with 72 holes in total.

== Hotels ==
There are six hotels; South Wing, North Wing, and The Westin Rusutsu Resort (previously Rusutsu Tower), The Vale Rusutsu (Condo Hotel), Travel Lodge, Highland Lodge(previously Main Building) . The facilities can accommodate up to 4,000 visitors. The 79 m (259 ft) tall Rusutsu Tower opened in 1993 and is a symbol of the resort. Since July 8, 2016, it has been renamed to The Westin Rusutsu Resort. It is linked to South Wing by a slope car (small rack monorail), and to East Mountain by Tower Pair Lift.

There also is a campsite. Renewaled at 2021, expanded shop service and opened RV grounds.

== See also ==
- List of ski areas and resorts in Asia
- List of amusement parks
- List of aerial lifts in Japan
