= Shockwave (Kings Dominion) =

Defunct roller coaster in Virginia, US

- Shockwave in July 2001

Kings Dominion
- Location: Kings Dominion
- Park section: Candy Apple Grove
- Coordinates: 37°50′19″N 77°26′41″W
- Status: Removed
- Opening date: March 23, 1986
- Closing date: August 9, 2015
- Cost: $4,000,000
- Replaced: Galaxie
- Replaced by: Delirium

General statistics
- Type: Steel – Stand-up
- Manufacturer: TOGO
- Designer: TOGO
- Model: Standing Coaster
- Track layout: Custom
- Lift/launch system: Chain lift hill
- Height: 95 ft (29 m)
- Length: 2,231 ft (680 m)
- Speed: 50 mph (80 km/h)
- Inversions: 1
- Duration: 2:00
- Max vertical angle: 52°
- Capacity: 960 riders per hour
- Trains: 2 trains with 6 cars; riders arranged 2 across in 2 rows for a total of 24 riders per train
- Height restriction: Must be able to straddle seat with feet on floor.
- Shockwave at RCDB

Shockwave was a stand-up roller coaster located at Kings Dominion in Doswell, Virginia. Opened in 1986, it was the third stand-up roller coaster installation built and designed by Japanese company TOGO. Following closures of the previous two, it became the oldest of its kind still in operation. After nearly thirty years in operation, Shockwave closed permanently on August 9, 2015. It was replaced by Delirium, a Mondial Revolution flat ride, which opened in 2016.

== History ==
The site on which Shockwave stood was formerly home to the Galaxie roller coaster, a small steel coaster of the S.D.C. Galaxi model. However, on September 11, 1983, an incident on the coaster resulted in the fatal injury of 13-year-old Daniel Watkins. The incident was used as the primary example of unsafe rides in local press coverage of the concurrent U.S. Senate hearings on amusement ride safety and regulation. Rather than reopen the attraction, Kings Dominion dismantled and sold it, to the Myrtle Beach Pavilion where it operated until 1997 as the Galaxi.

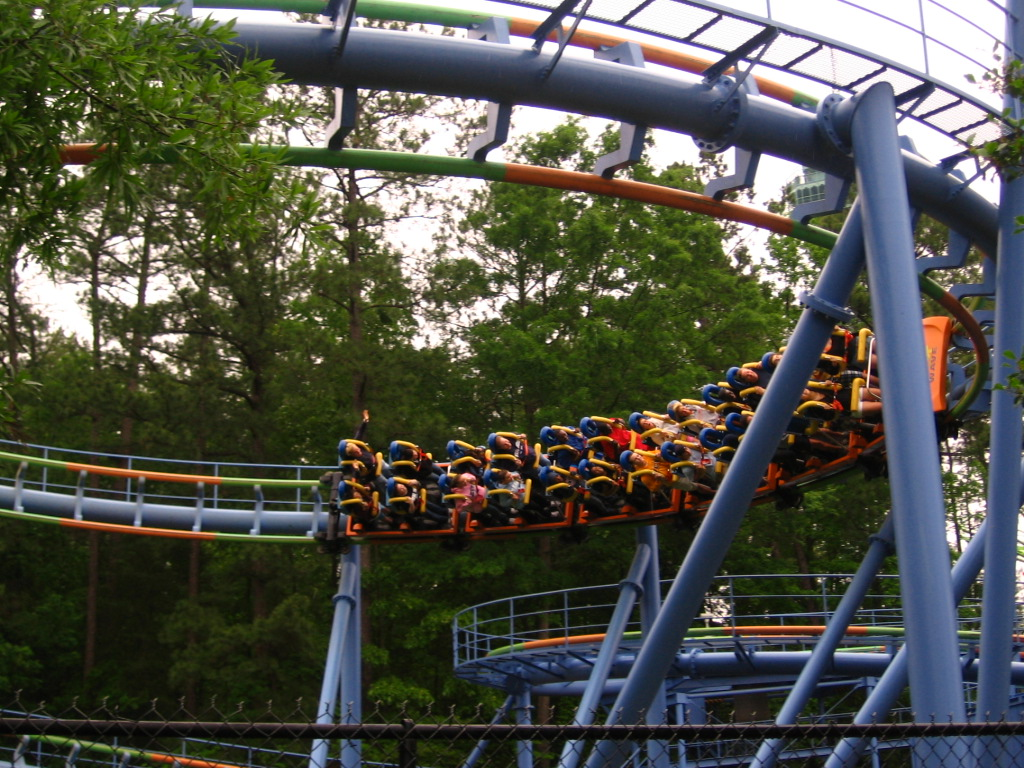
A train on the double-helix element

In August 1985, Kings Dominion announced that they would be building a TOGO stand-up roller coaster to replace Galaxie. It would be named Shockwave. The station design was known for having a station floor that was not level, which tilted down toward the front where the train exited. This eliminated the need to propel trains as they dispatched from the station, instead relying on gravity to roll out of the station.

Shockwave opened to the public on March 23, 1986. On opening day, its wait times were two and a half hours long. This was one of the two stand-up coasters named Shockwave to open that year, with the other one being at Six Flags Magic Mountain which opened two months later on May 16. The latter coaster was relocated to Six Flags Great Adventure in 1990 and Six Flags AstroWorld three years later in 1993 as Batman The Escape.

Shockwave became rougher over the years and its popularity began to decrease. Plus, the closure of TOGO's American offices in 2001 made getting spare parts much harder and expensive. After operating for nearly 30 years and accommodating over 22 million riders, Kings Dominion announced on July 9, 2015, that Shockwave would permanently close. Kings Dominion Vice President Pat Jones released a statement saying, "While it’s bittersweet to say goodbye to one of our older coasters, we’re excited for what the future holds...We’re happy that Shockwave was able to provide close to three decades of memories.” The last rides on Shockwave were given on August 9, 2015. A week later on August 20, Kings Dominion announced that it would be replaced by Delirium for the 2016 season. Demolition of Shockwave began in November 2015.

== Theming ==
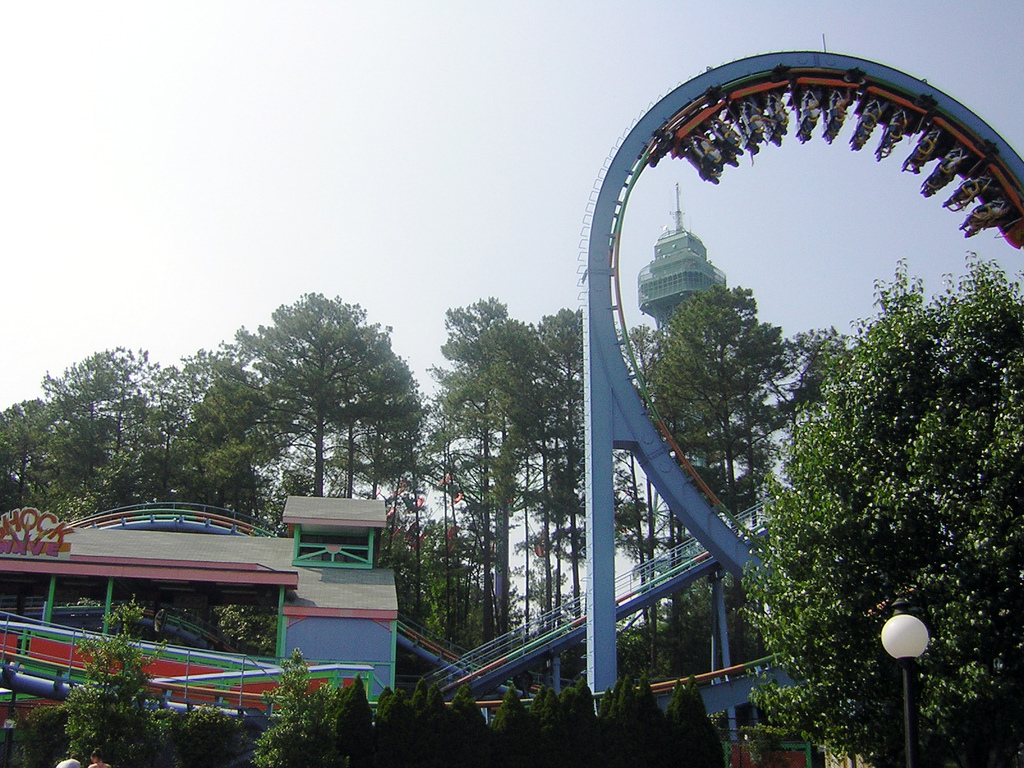
Vertical loop with station in the background

The trains were painted blue with yellow restraints, and the station with natural-toned stain and paint. For the park's 25th anniversary in 2000, the entire ride was painted in non-standard scheme, neon colors. The superstructure and main rail were painted periwinkle, with the running rails alternating patches of aquamarine and orange. The trains were repainted orange, and the station in the same neon colors as the track. In 2011, Shockwave was repainted green for the tracks and teal for the supports.

== Incidents ==
On the evening of August 23, 1999, a 20-year-old man was thrown from the train's final turn at a speed of 40 miles per hour (64 km/h) sustaining a fatal head injury upon contact with a steel walkway. Shockwave and two similar rides at other Paramount amusement parks were immediately closed. The event was originally reported as "an accident [that] resulted in the death of one park visitor," but further investigation proved otherwise. Bolstered by numerous eyewitness accounts, the cause was later attributed to the victim's disregard of park safety rules as he was seen intentionally freeing himself from restraints. In addition, an inspection found the safety restraints to be working properly at the time of the accident. Shockwave was reopened three days later on August 26, 1999.

Less than two weeks later on September 2, 1999, a 13-year-old boy, concerned that he was not properly fastened into his restraints, intentionally slipped out of them as the train was ascending the lift hill. He jumped onto the adjacent maintenance catwalk and escaped serious injury.
