= Hunt's Pier =

Amusement park in Wildwood, New Jersey, U.S.

- Previously known as Ocean Pier
- Interactive map of Hunt's Pier
- Location: 2701 Boardwalk, Wildwood, New Jersey, United States
- Coordinates: 38.989°N 74.804°W
- Status: Defunct
- Opened: May 30, 1957
- Closed: 1990
- Owner: William Hunt
- Later operated as: The New Hunt's Pier, Conko's Party Pier, and Dinosaur Beach

Hunt's Pier was an amusement pier located along the Wildwood, New Jersey, boardwalk from 1957 through 1985. Over its nearly 30 years in operation, Hunt's was home to many classic dark rides, roller coasters, and other attractions.

== History ==
Hunt's Pier dates back to the early 1900s when it was known as Ocean Pier, the first major pier on the boardwalk. Home to ballroom dancing and musical acts, Ocean Pier was purchased by William Hunt in 1935 and converted to an amusement park with rides, including a Ferris wheel, a roller coaster, and a dark ride.

On Christmas Day 1943, Ocean Pier burned down. Hunt built a new, all-concrete pier in its place. On May 30, 1957, Memorial Day, the revamped Hunt's Pier opened. The amusement park began with only four rides, though it boasted 10 rides by the time of its grand opening on June 21, 1957.

In 1985 Hunt's Pier was sold and continued operation until the end of the 1988 season when many of the "Super Custom" rides and attractions were demolished. Under the ownership of Conklin Shows it reopened in 1989 as Conko's Party Pier, highlighted by a new steel roller coaster called Kamikaze. This latest incarnation of the pier was short-lived and following another rebranding as The New Hunt's Pier, the operation went bankrupt and closed following the 1992 season. The Kamikaze was sold and currently operates under the name Blue Hawk at Six Flags Over Georgia.

The Cantonoso family, owners of Steel Pier in Atlantic City, bought the defunct pier in 1995. By the summer of 1996, the pier reopened as Dinosaur Beach and featured dinosaur-themed rides and prehistoric motifs added to the existing Golden Nugget Mine Ride and Log Flume. In addition to a water coaster and an amphitheatre, Dinosaur Beach debuted the country's first spinning wild mouse in 1997. Dinosaur Beach closed following the 1998 season and over the next few years most of the remaining rides and attractions were removed.

== Present day ==
The pier is currently owned by Morey's Piers and is used to house maintenance equipment and the boardwalk tram cars. A grill, beach shop, and Adventure Maze are now on the front of the pier. Morey's Piers previously announced plans to construct a wooden roller coaster crossing from Surfside Pier to Hunt's Pier, but as of 2022 no announcement or progress has been made.

== Legacy ==
Hunt's Pier featured many "Super Custom" rides and attractions, including a classic wooden roller coaster called the Flyer which appears in the film Birdy, indoor rides such as Keystone Kops and Whacky Shack, and an outdoor boat ride called Jungleland. For many years, The Golden Nugget had the honor of being the oldest ride on the Wildwood Boardwalk still surviving in its original form and location. The Golden Nugget originally opened in July 1960 on the newly constructed oceanside section of Hunt's Pier. The Golden Nugget was built three stories high with the top floor designed to imitate a mine car ride through the desert. The classic coaster ride was specially constructed for Hunt's Pier by the Philadelphia Toboggan Company and was engineered by John Allen. It was removed in 2009, and a ceremony commemorating the ride was held in January of that year in anticipation of its removal.

In early 2009, Knoebels Amusement Resort entered into agreement with Morey's Piers to acquire the trains, tracks, and ancillary mechanical equipment from the Golden Nugget ride. The equipment was moved to Pennsylvania in early 2009 for a planned reproduction of the Golden Nugget at its Elysburg, Pennsylvania, park. Renamed Black Diamond, it officially opened in October 2011. The original stunts and gags included in the ride were not part of the sale and have been retained by Morey's Piers for usage elsewhere.

The Wildwood Historical Society/George F. Boyer Museum currently houses numerous artifacts from Hunt's Pier including Keystone Kops characters, ride and attraction models, and hundreds of photographs. Authors Rob Ascough and Al Alven, working in partnership with the museum, published Images Of America: Hunt's Pier in 2011 and remains a vital source for information covering the history of the pier from its Ocean Pier origins to the years following Dinosaur Beach. Near Historic Cold Spring Village, Hunt's abandoned storage and maintenance once housed signs and parts of former rides including boats for the Log Flume, trains for the Flyer that are currently under restoration, the Paul Bunyan figure, and letters from the Hunt's Pier Skyline Golf sign that stood opposite the pier atop the Ocean Theater. As of 2021, the site has been cleared and now houses a solar farm.

In addition to the aforementioned Golden Nugget and Kamikaze having found new homes at Knoebels Amusement Resort and Six Flags Over Georgia, the former Log Flume currently operates as The Boji Falls Log Ride at Arnolds Park in Iowa, and the Crazy Mouse operated on Steel Pier in Atlantic City from 1999 to 2021 till it was replaced by a similar model by a different manufacturer.
