= Flashback (Six Flags Magic Mountain) =

Defunct steel roller coaster

- Previously known as Z-Force (1985–1991) at Six Flags Over Georgia and Six Flags Great America
- An artist's renderation of Flashback when it was known as Z-Force.

Six Flags Magic Mountain
- Park section: Six Flags Plaza
- Coordinates: 34.424597°N 118.595542°W
- Status: Removed
- Opening date: April 25, 1992
- Closing date: 2003
- Cost: $4,000,000

Six Flags Over Georgia
- Coordinates: 33.768°N 84.551°W
- Status: Removed
- Opening date: April 1988
- Closing date: 1991
- Replaced by: Blue Hawk

Six Flags Great America
- Coordinates: 42.366099°N 87.931116°W
- Status: Removed
- Opening date: July 10, 1985
- Closing date: 1987
- Replaced by: Iron Wolf

General statistics
- Type: Steel
- Manufacturer: Intamin
- Designer: Werner Stengel
- Model: Space Diver
- Lift/launch system: Chain lift hill
- Height: 86 ft (26 m)
- Drop: 34 ft (10 m)
- Length: 1,900 ft (580 m)
- Speed: 35 mph (56 km/h)
- Inversions: 0
- Duration: 1:30
- Max vertical angle: 89°
- Capacity: 1,100 riders per hour
- G-force: 3
- Height restriction: 48 in (122 cm)
- Trains: 3 trains with 5 cars; riders arranged 4 across in a single row for a total of 20 riders per train
- Flashback at RCDB

Flashback was a steel roller coaster made by Intamin of Liechtenstein. The coaster was located in the Six Flags Plaza area of Six Flags Magic Mountain in Valencia, California. The model of the ride, a Space Diver coaster, was intended to be mass-produced, however, Flashback was the only installation.

== History ==
=== Six Flags Great America (1985–1987) ===
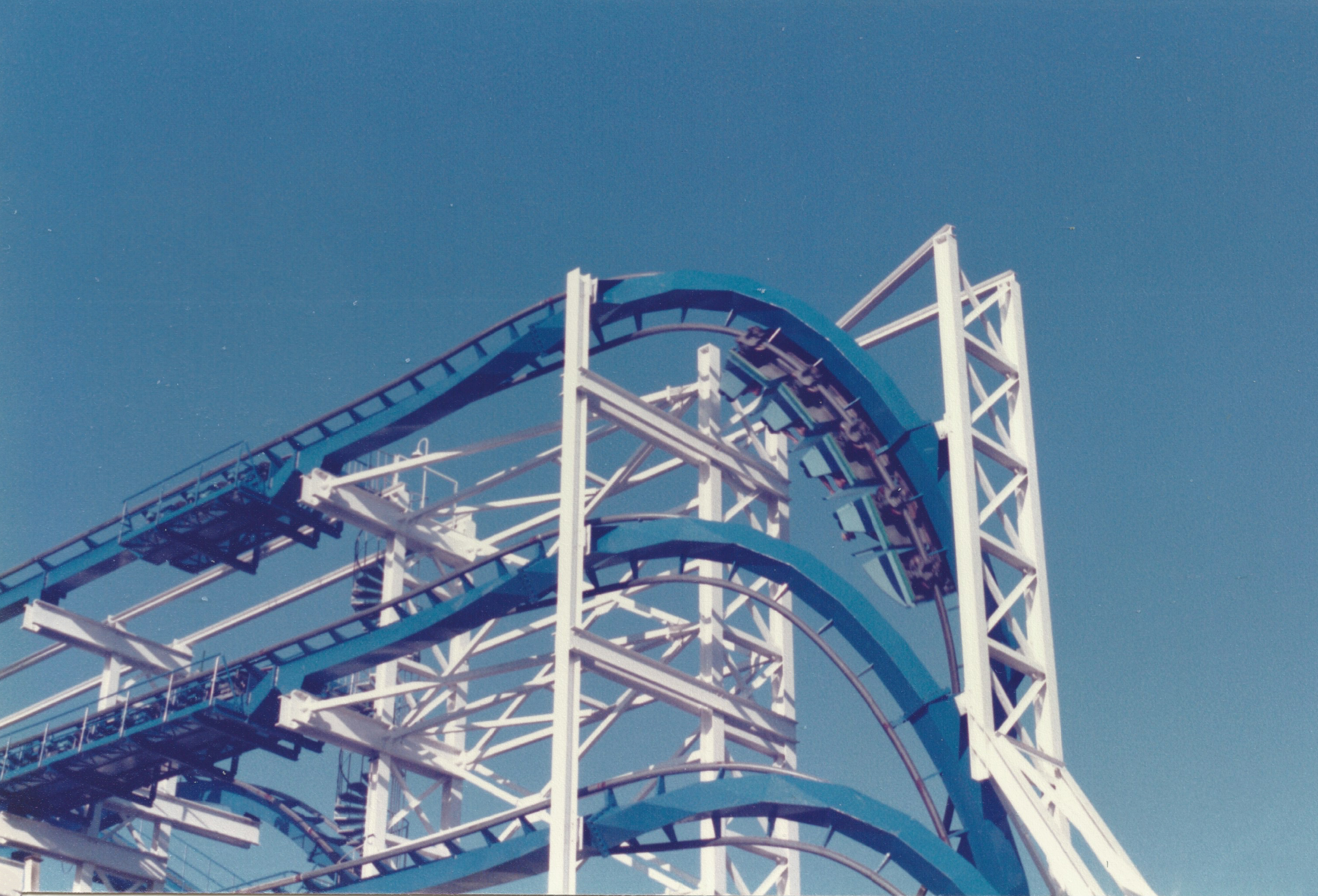
Z-Force at Six Flags Great America in August 1986

Flashback first opened in 1985 at Six Flags Great America (at Gurnee, Illinois) as Z-Force. It was a prototype Space Diver that was purchased from the Intamin testing facility. In 1987, the ride was closed. The site was later used for a Bolliger & Mabillard stand-up roller coaster named Iron Wolf.

=== Six Flags Over Georgia (1988–1991) ===
Following the ride's closure at Six Flags Great America, it was relocated to Six Flags Over Georgia, west of Atlanta. On July 18, 1989, an 11-year-old boy from Talladega, Alabama, became unconscious while riding Z-Force. Park staff performed CPR, but the victim was pronounced dead after being taken to HCA Parkway Medical Center. An autopsy failed to pinpoint the cause of death. The ride opened in 1988 before closing three seasons later in 1991.

=== Six Flags Magic Mountain (1992–2007) ===
The ride's final relocation was to Six Flags Magic Mountain in California. As part of the relocation, the ride was renamed from Z-Force to Flashback. It opened at the park in 1992.

Flashback gained a reputation as a painful ride experience. Riders would hit their heads on the uncomfortable restraints during each hairpin dive. In June 1995, Six Flags Magic Mountain opened a water park named Hurricane Harbor right next to the ride. Flashback was so noisy that the lifeguards were distracted, as well as the guests at Hurricane Harbor. Following these complaints, the ride would remain closed from May to September beginning in 1996.

The ride was closed from 2003 until 2007. On January 23, 2007, the park announced that Flashback would be removed along with Psyclone. Originally, the park stated that Flashback may be re-built within the park for 2008, however it was dismantled and scrapped in December 2007.

== Summary ==
=== Ride experience ===
Flashback was the world's only hairpin-drop roller coaster, with 6 head-over-heels dives and a 540-degree upward spiral. It was also the only Space Dive coaster ever to be built. It was all packed into a relatively small area with 1,900 feet (580 m) of track stacked above each other. The drops were severe, producing a free-fall experience on the plunges; fast steel switchbacks connected the turns just before trains flew into the gravity-defying upward spiral. Trains reached a max of 35 miles per hour (56 km/h), with a 3-g force on the one and a half minute ride.

=== Track ===
Throughout its life, Flashback's track was painted blue with white supports. The style of track used on this coaster became the signature track style of coasters built by Bolliger & Mabillard.

=== Trains ===
The ride featured three trains, each with five cars. Each car featured riders arranged 4 across for a total of 20 riders per train. The trains were manufactured by Giovanola. When Flashback was known as Z-Force, the trains were painted all blue with a navy blue stripe running down on the sides of the train. The trains used the same restraint system as Intamin's Looping Starship rides, with padded royal blue lap bars, and royal blue neck harnesses. After its relocation to Six Flags Magic Mountain, Flashback's trains were repainted red with a white chassis and a white stripe on the sides of each car. The shoulders restraints and lap bars were also repainted orange.
