= Black Diamond (roller coaster) =

Roller coaster at Knoebels Amusement Resort

- The building housing Black Diamond in 2015

Knoebels Amusement Resort
- Coordinates: 40.8797°N 76.5068°W
- Status: Operating
- Opening date: October 8, 2011
- Cost: $2.25 million

Hunt's Pier
- Coordinates: 38°59′19.1″N 74°48′13.8″W
- Status: Removed
- Opening date: July 1961
- Closing date: 1998 (SBNO until 2009)

General statistics
- Type: Steel – Family – Enclosed
- Manufacturer: Philadelphia Toboggan Coasters
- Designer: John C. Allen
- Height: 35 ft (11 m)
- Inversions: 0
- Height restriction: 42 in (107 cm)
- Black Diamond at RCDB

Black Diamond is a roller coaster at Knoebels Amusement Resort in Elysburg, Pennsylvania. The ride has a steel track on a wooden frame. The roller coaster originally opened in 1960 as Golden Nugget at Hunt's Pier, and it eventually became part of Morey's Piers in Wildwood, New Jersey, where it operated until 1999 and stood unused until early 2009. The ride was relocated to Knoebels and reopened on October 8, 2011, as Black Diamond.

== History ==
Golden Nugget opened in July 1960 at Hunt's Pier on the newly constructed ocean side portion. Golden Nugget was built three stories high, with the top floor giving riders a mine car ride through the “desert”. The coaster was specially designed for Hunt's Pier by Philadelphia Toboggan Coasters (PTC) and was engineered by John C. Allen. The owners of Hunt's Pier constructed the frame, track supports, and facade in the 1959 off-season. Bill Tracy designed the ride’s western theme pieces through his Amusement Display company. On December 11, 2008, Morey's Piers announced that Golden Nugget would be demolished, and that they would have a ceremony for it on January 31, 2009.

On January 26, 2009, it was publicly announced that Knoebels Amusement Resort had purchased the Golden Nugget track and trains from Morey's Piers.

The coaster was modified and rebuilt on the location where Knoebels' former bald eagle habitat resided. The eagle's habitat was relocated to make way for Golden Nugget. Golden Nugget was renamed Black Diamond and reopened on October 8, 2011.

== See also ==
- 2011 in amusement parks
