= Blue Hawk (roller coaster) =

Roller coaster at Six Flags Over Georgia

- Previously known as Ninja (1992–2015); Kamikaze (1989–1991)
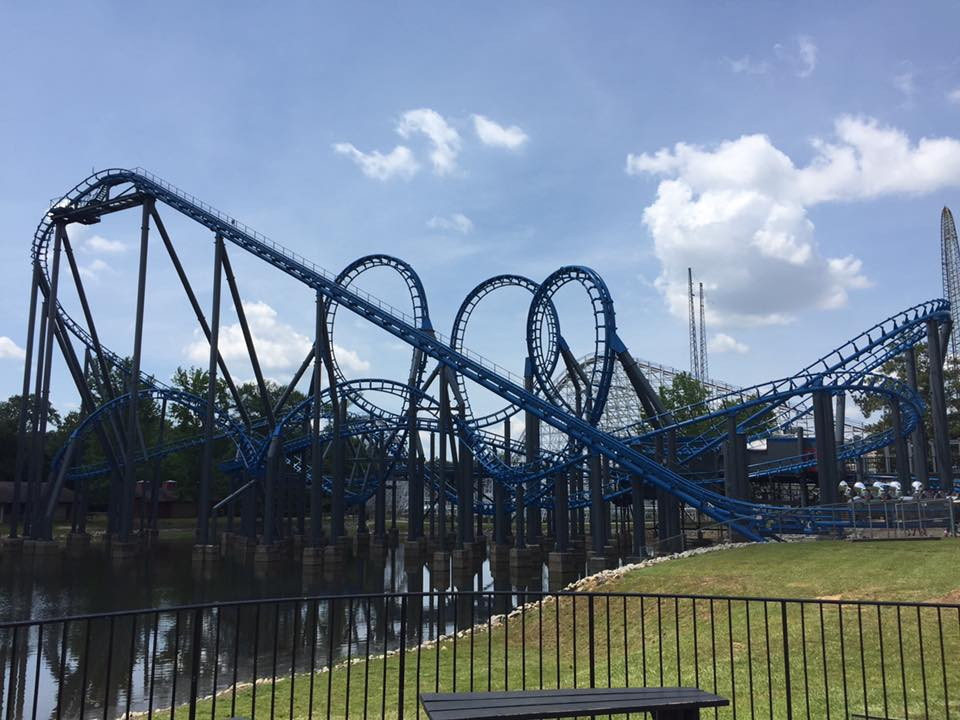
- Blue Hawk in 2016

Six Flags Over Georgia
- Park section: Lickskillet
- Coordinates: 33.7656°N 84.5503°W
- Status: Operating
- Opening date: March 1, 1992

Conko's Party Pier
- Coordinates: 38.989°N 74.804°W
- Status: Removed
- Opening date: 1989
- Closing date: 1991
- Blue Hawk at Conko's Party Pier at RCDB

General statistics
- Type: Steel
- Manufacturer: Vekoma
- Model: MK-1200 (Custom)
- Track layout: Twister
- Lift/launch system: Chain lift hill
- Height: 122 ft (37 m)
- Drop: 109 ft (33 m)
- Length: 2,742 ft (836 m)
- Speed: 52 mph (84 km/h)
- Inversions: 5
- Duration: 1:20
- Max vertical angle: 48°
- Capacity: 1300 riders per hour
- G-force: 4.0
- Restraint style: Vest
- Height restriction: 48 in (122 cm)
- Trains: 2 trains with 7 cars; riders arranged 2 across in 2 rows for a total of 28 riders per train
- Fast Lane available
- Blue Hawk at RCDB

Blue Hawk is a steel roller coaster at Six Flags Over Georgia in Mableton, Georgia, United States. Manufactured by Vekoma, Blue Hawk was originally built for Conko's Party Pier in New Jersey, where it was known as Kamikaze. It was relocated to Six Flags Over Georgia in 1992 as Ninja, and was the tallest roller coaster in the park at that time. In 2016, Six Flags announced that the ride would be renovated and renamed, with members of the public voting on the ride's new name.

== History ==
Hunt's Pier in Wildwood, New Jersey purchased and installed this roller coaster, naming it Kamikaze, in 1989. Kamikaze was purchased by Six Flags and relocated to Six Flags Over Georgia, where it was given the new name Ninja. Ninja was placed in the park's Cotton States section and sits roughly where Z-Force was previously located prior to its removal after the 1990 season, opening to the public on March 1, 1992.

The ride received extensive work in 2016 and did not open with the park for its new season. The ride was repainted with blue track and gray supports. Following rider complaints of a rough ride and low attendance as Ninja, Blue Hawk’s track was inspected and repaired as needed to improve smoothness, and the trains were replaced with two new models featuring soft vest restraints instead of the previous over-the-shoulder harnesses. Park guests were invited to vote for one of three potential new names for the ride—American Eagle, Air Commander or Blue Hawk. After more than 6,000 votes were cast, voters selected Blue Hawk as the new name. The renovated ride is themed to the American military and re-opened to guests on June 9, 2016.

== Ride experience ==
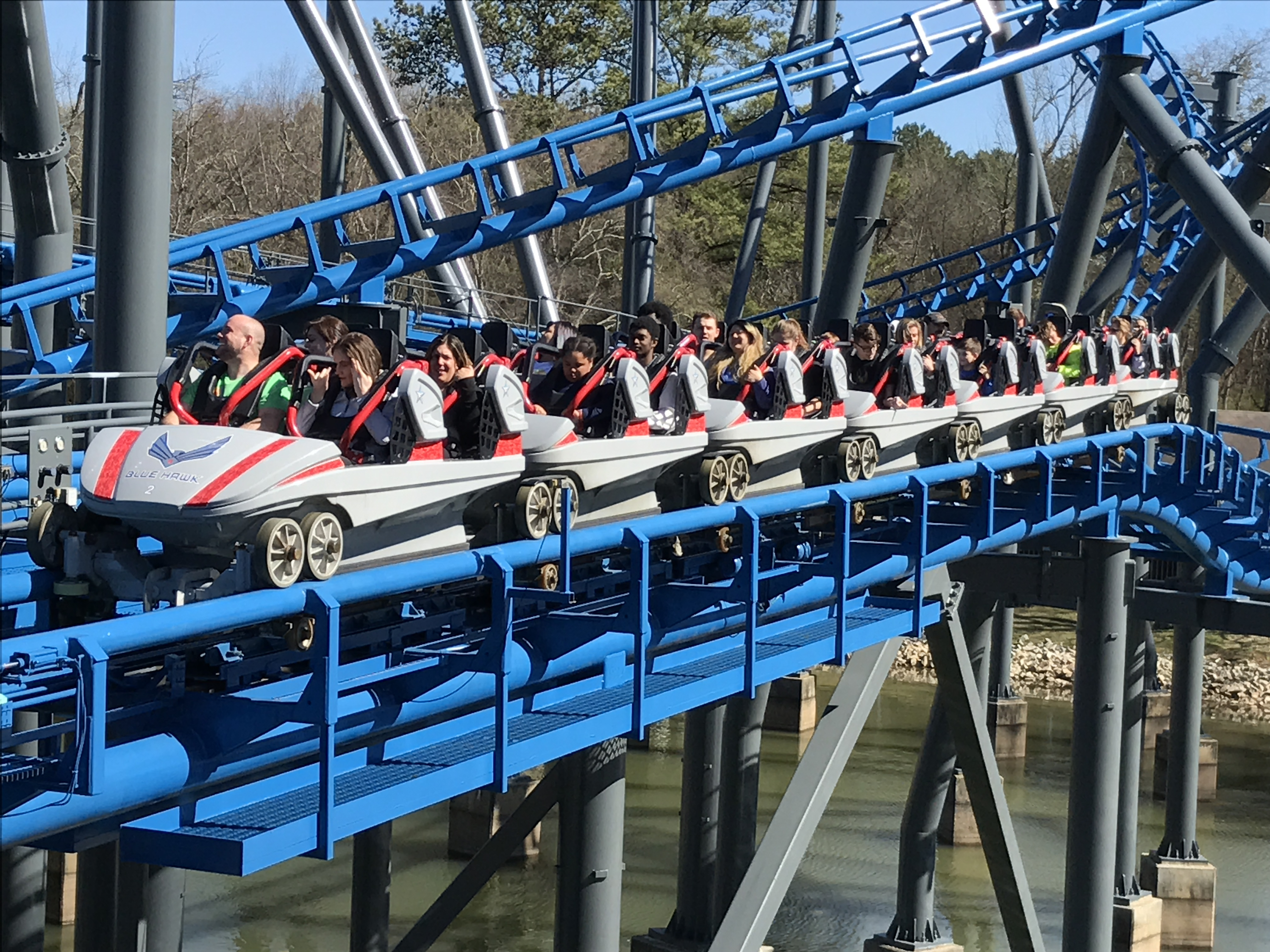
One of Blue Hawk's new trains

Blue Hawk uses two 28-passenger trains, each with seven cars carrying four passengers in two rows of two seats. Riders are held in place using vest-style restraints. As Blue Hawk departs the station, it turns to the right, dropping slightly before another right turn to start up the 122-foot-tall (37 m) lift hill. Upon cresting the lift, the roller coaster dives downward to the right before swooping up into the first major element, a two-inversion butterfly. Exiting the butterfly, the train enters a wide-radius 270-degree curve to the left, setting up the third inversion, a reverse sidewinder.

Blue Hawk climbs a gentle slope before making a U-turn to the left and entering its final element, a double corkscrew. After completing the final inversion, the train banks to the left and passes very close to the station and under the reverse sidewinder, then turns right prior to entering the main brake run. The train exits the brakes and makes a final U-turn to the right to set up the return to the station.

== In popular culture ==
Prior to renovation, the coaster was featured as Walley World's "Velociraptor" in the 2015 film Vacation.
