= List of roller coaster elements =

Roller coasters are widely known for their drops, inversions, airtime, and other intense ride elements that contribute to the ride. They are also made up of a variety of features and components responsible for the mechanical operation and safety of the ride. Some are very common and appear on every roller coaster in some form, while others are unique to certain makes and models. Amusement parks often compete to build the tallest, fastest, and longest roller coasters to attract thrill seekers and boost park attendance. As coaster design evolved with the aid of computer-simulated models, newer innovations produced more intense thrills while improving overall quality and durability.

== Common elements ==
=== Banked turn ===
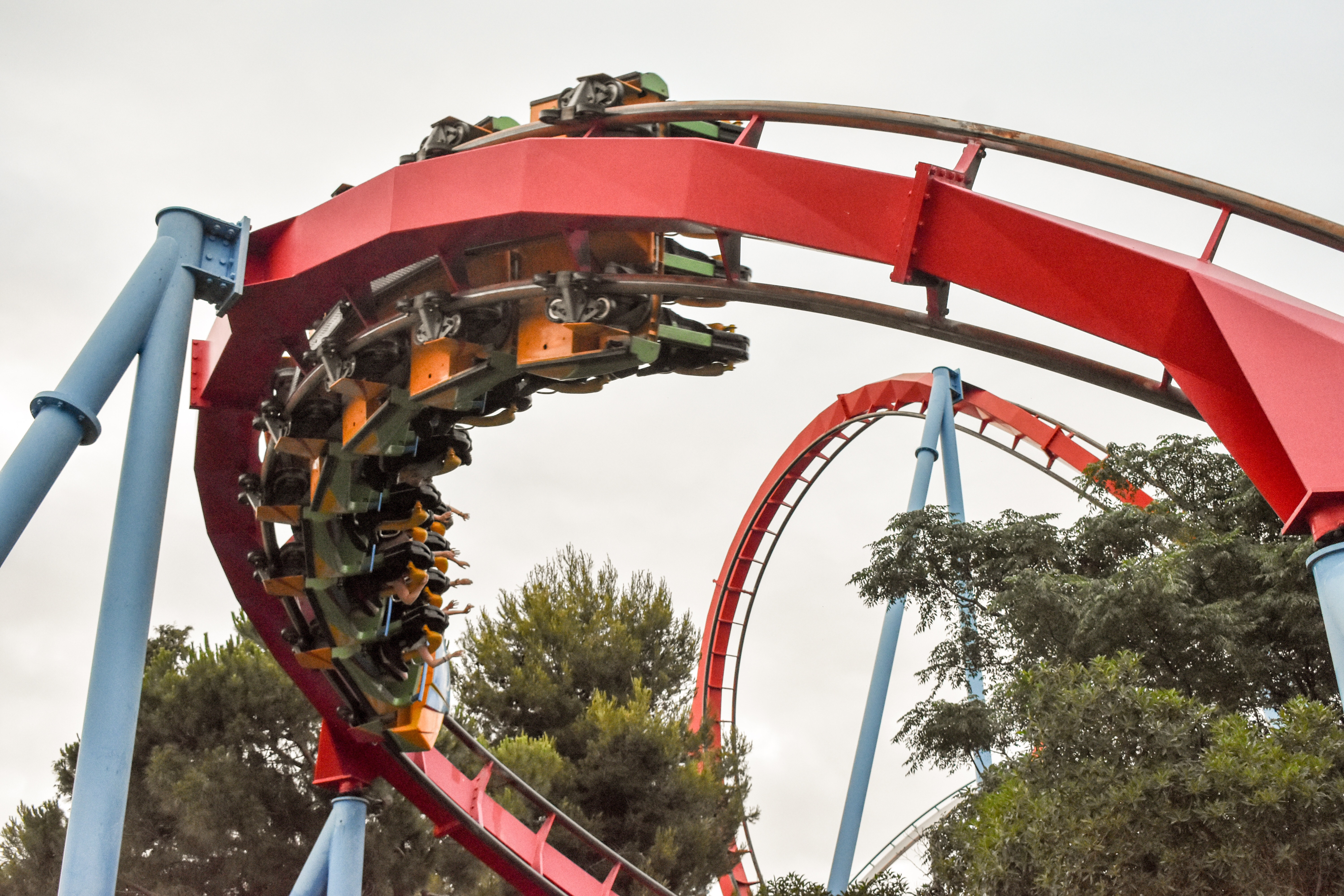
A banked turn on Dragon Khan

A banked turn is when the track twists from the horizontal plane into the vertical plane, tipping the train to the side in the direction of the turn. Banking is used to minimize the lateral g-forces on the riders to make the turn more comfortable. When a banked turn continues to create an upward or downward spiral of approximately 360 degrees or more, it becomes a helix.

=== Brake run ===
A brake run on a roller coaster is any section of track that utilizes some form of brakes to slow or stop a roller coaster train. The most common type is the friction brake, often called a fin brake, which involves a series of hydraulically powered clamps that close and squeeze metal fins attached to the underside of a coaster train. Other common types include skid brakes and magnetic brakes. These different types are divided into two main categories; trim brakes refer to brake runs that slow the train, while block brakes are brake sections that can stop the train completely. Roller coasters may incorporate multiple brake runs throughout the coaster's track layout to adjust the train's speed.

While modern roller coasters have at least one computer-controlled brake run embedded in the track, older coasters such as The Great Scenic Railway at Luna Park Melbourne may have brakes onboard the train and rely on a brakeman operator to apply them as needed. Older wooden coasters are also more likely to rely on skid brakes.

=== Drive tire ===
A drive tire, or squeeze tire depending on its usage, is a motorized tire used to propel a roller coaster train along a piece of track. Although they are most often used in station areas and brake runs, they can also be used to launch trains at greater speeds. However, they are generally used to propel the train at speeds between 5-8 mph. The Incredible Hulk Coaster at Universal's Islands of Adventure is notable for using drive tires to launch the train up an incline.

Some roller coasters use drive tires instead of a chain on lift hills. Notable examples include many children's coasters made by Vekoma and Zierer, Olympia Looping, and formerly Mindbender at Galaxyland. Drive tires are also used to power other types of amusement rides, such as Ferris wheels, pirate ships, and other spinning rides.

When oriented horizontally, drive tires are often put in pairs so as to "squeeze" a portion of the train as it crosses that section of track. In this case, it is usually the brake fin that is used to propel or slow the train with the tires. When oriented vertically, they contact the underside of the train as it crosses a particular section of track. This underside area is a flat area which often has a grated metal surface to increase friction between the car and the tire. One disadvantage of vertical drive tires is that rainy weather can greatly reduce friction between the tire and the train, possibly causing the train to slightly overshoot its intended position and cause an emergency stop.

=== Headchopper ===
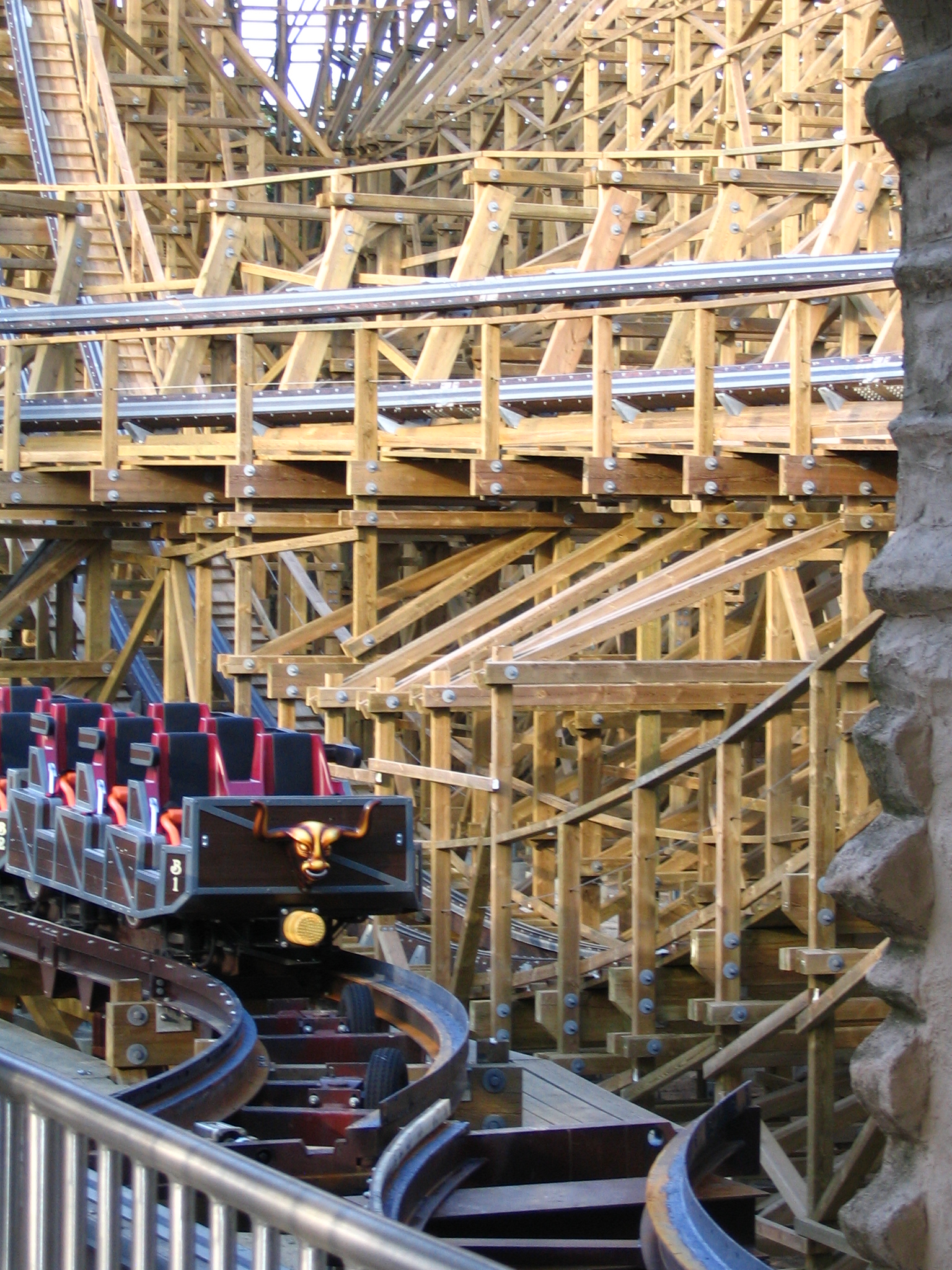
A headchopper element on El Toro

A headchopper is an element where the support structure of the ride or a portion of the track appears to come very close to making contact with passengers, particularly with their heads. The illusion is intentional, and headchoppers are designed so that even the tallest rider, with both hands up, would be unable to make contact assuming rider height requirements are being met.

On inverted roller coasters, the equivalent is a footchopper, which creates the illusion that riders' legs will make contact with the ride's support structure or some other structure, similar to headchopper.

Both headchoppers and foot choppers can appear on Wing Coaster models from Bolliger & Mabillard when the train passes through keyhole elements. The train seats riders in pairs on both sides of the track, with nothing above or below each rider, as it passes through the center of an object creating the illusion its passengers may not have enough clearance to fit.

=== Helix ===
A helix is a section of track that forms a spiral, which generally exceeds 360°. Helixes can spiral upward or downward.

=== Launch track ===
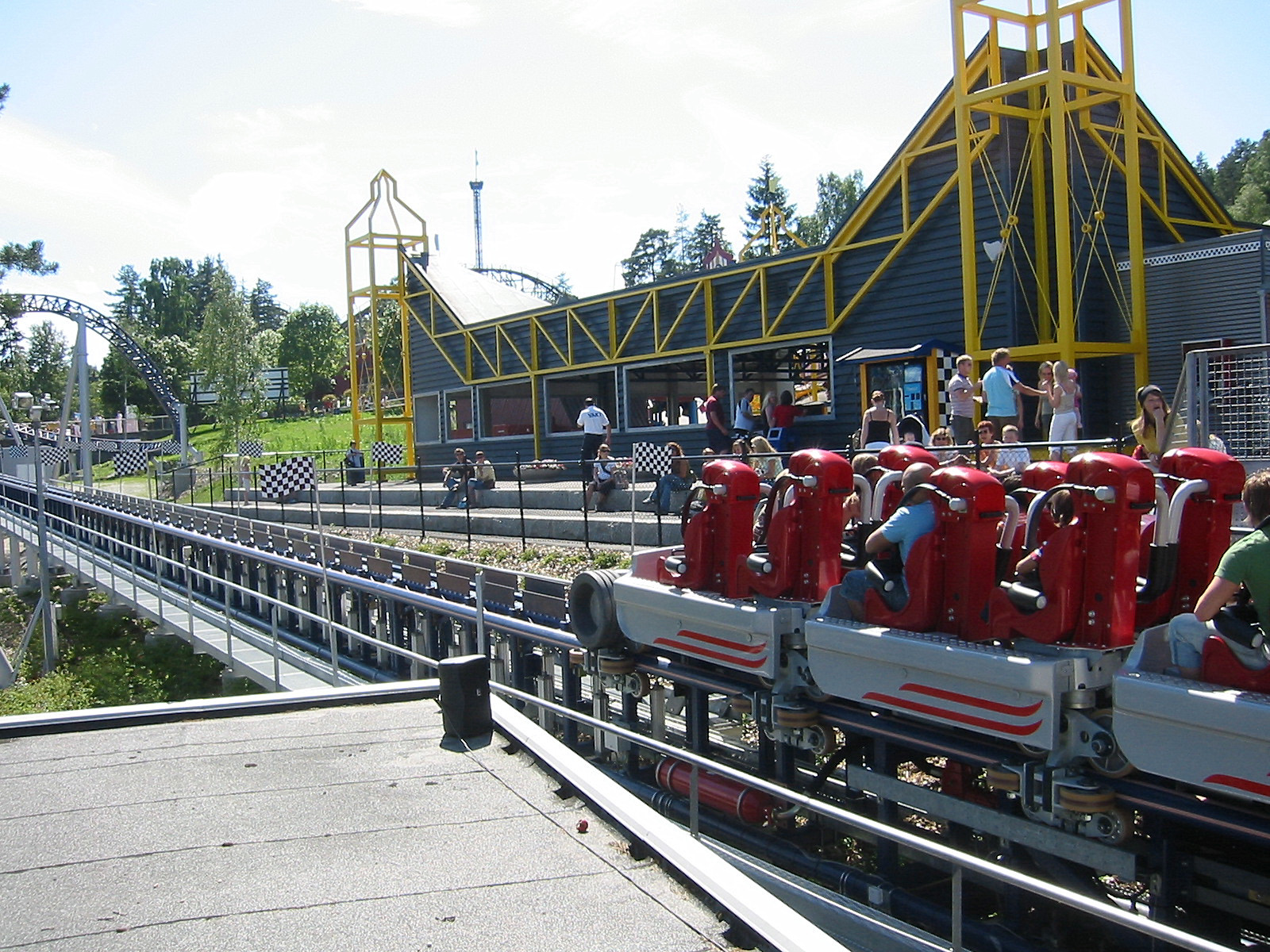
The launch track on SpeedMonster

A launch track is a straight section of track along a launched roller coaster layout in which the train is quickly accelerated to a significant velocity in a matter of seconds. It serves the same basic purpose as a lift hill—providing energy to the train—but does so in a different manner. A lift hill gives the train potential energy as it is slowly raised to the highest point of the lift hill and released. A launch track gives the train kinetic energy immediately during its quick acceleration at launch, which often occurs before the train enters its first significant incline.

A launch track normally includes some form of brakes to brace for an expected return of the train, such as in a shuttle roller coaster design, or for an unexpected return of the train when a rollback occurs on a complete-circuit coaster. Rollbacks are more common on coasters that feature a top hat element, such as Stealth at Thorpe Park, and Top Thrill 2 at Cedar Point. Typically, brakes on a launch track retract to a lower position during launch and move into an engaged position immediately after launch.

=== Lift hill ===
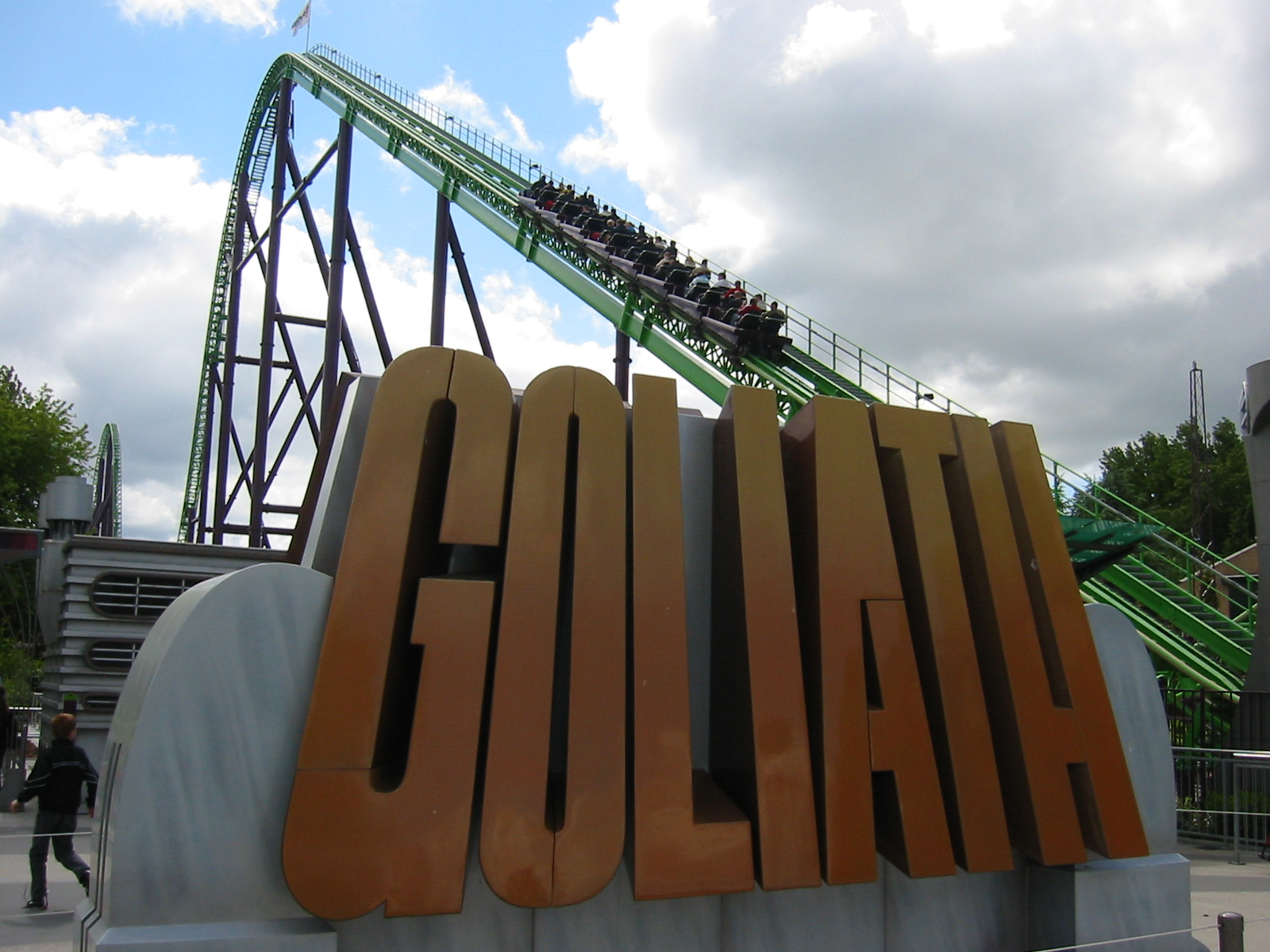
A 150-foot (46 m) lift hill on Goliath at Walibi Holland

A lift hill, or chain lift, is often the initial upward section of track on a typical roller coaster that initially transports the roller coaster train to an elevated point. Upon reaching the top, the train is then disengaged from the lift hill and allowed to coast through the rest of the roller coaster's circuit.

Lift hills usually propel the train to the top of the ride via one of a few different types of methods: a chain lift involving a long, continuous chain which trains hook on to and are carried to the top; a drive tire system in which multiple motorized tires push the train upward; a cable lift system as seen on Millennium Force at Cedar Point; or a linear synchronous motor system as seen on Maverick, also at Cedar Point.

Launch lift hills are similar to launch tracks, but inclined rather than flat. Sometimes, launch lift hills serve the same purpose as lift hills but offer faster transport to the top of the lift hill; or they are sometimes used to power the train up into an element, like on The Incredible Hulk Coaster at Universal's Islands of Adventure. Launch lift hills use mostly linear synchronous motors or linear induction motors but sometimes use drive tires.

=== Linear induction motor ===
The linear induction motor is a simple but powerful type of electric motor used to propel the cars. Rather than using a standard enclosed spinning rotor and drive wheels, there is a long flat magnetic pole plate with closely spaced electric coils. This pole plate mounts on the track underneath the car and a matching metal plate attached to the car moves across the magnetic pole faces. By applying a multiphase alternating current to the poles, the pole plate induces eddy currents into the moving plate and can be used to accelerate or brake the car.

Compared to other drive mechanisms, the linear motor is typically maintenance-free. The pole faces on the track and moving plate attached to the car do not need to touch, and the gap between them can be quite wide to accommodate any side-to-side car motion, so there is no friction or wear between them. Further, the magnetic coil assembly on the driving pole plates are either potted or sealed in a weathertight enclosure, so that rain, vibration, and dust do not affect motor performance or cause drive motor slippage.

=== On-ride camera ===
An on-ride camera automatically photographs riders as they pass a designated point along a roller coaster's track. Cameras may be positioned to capture riders' reactions during some of the ride's more thrilling elements such as drops. The photographs are available for viewing and purchase after the ride, and some attractions also offer video recordings or animated GIFs. Seven Dwarfs Mine Train and Tron Lightcycle / Run at Magic Kingdom, for example, offer video recordings of riders through Disney PhotoPass.

=== Pre-drop ===
A pre-drop, or preliminary drop, is any small hill following the lift hill that precedes the main drop. After a train is hauled up the lift and begins to descend down the hill in a standard configuration, the force of gravity pulls the train cars that are still hooked to the lift. When a pre-drop is used, the tension and stress on the lift mechanism is reduced prior to the train's release. The element is commonly found on early B&M roller coasters, as well as older roller coasters from other manufacturers. An alternative name "trick hill" comes from the illusion created from the pre-drop, which "tricks" riders into thinking they have already started the main descent, when in fact they haven't.

=== Station ===
The station is the area where riders board and exit the ride vehicle. On many roller coasters, the queue divides into separate lines corresponding to the rows of seats, with gates controlling access to the boarding area. These gates separate waiting riders from moving vehicles and open to allow boarding. Before departure, ride attendants check that riders' restraints are secured.

=== Train ===
A roller coaster train consists of two or more connected cars that carry riders along the track. Joints between the cars allow them to move relative to one another as the train follows the track. Some roller coasters, including wild mouse roller coasters, use individual cars instead of trains.

=== Tunnels ===
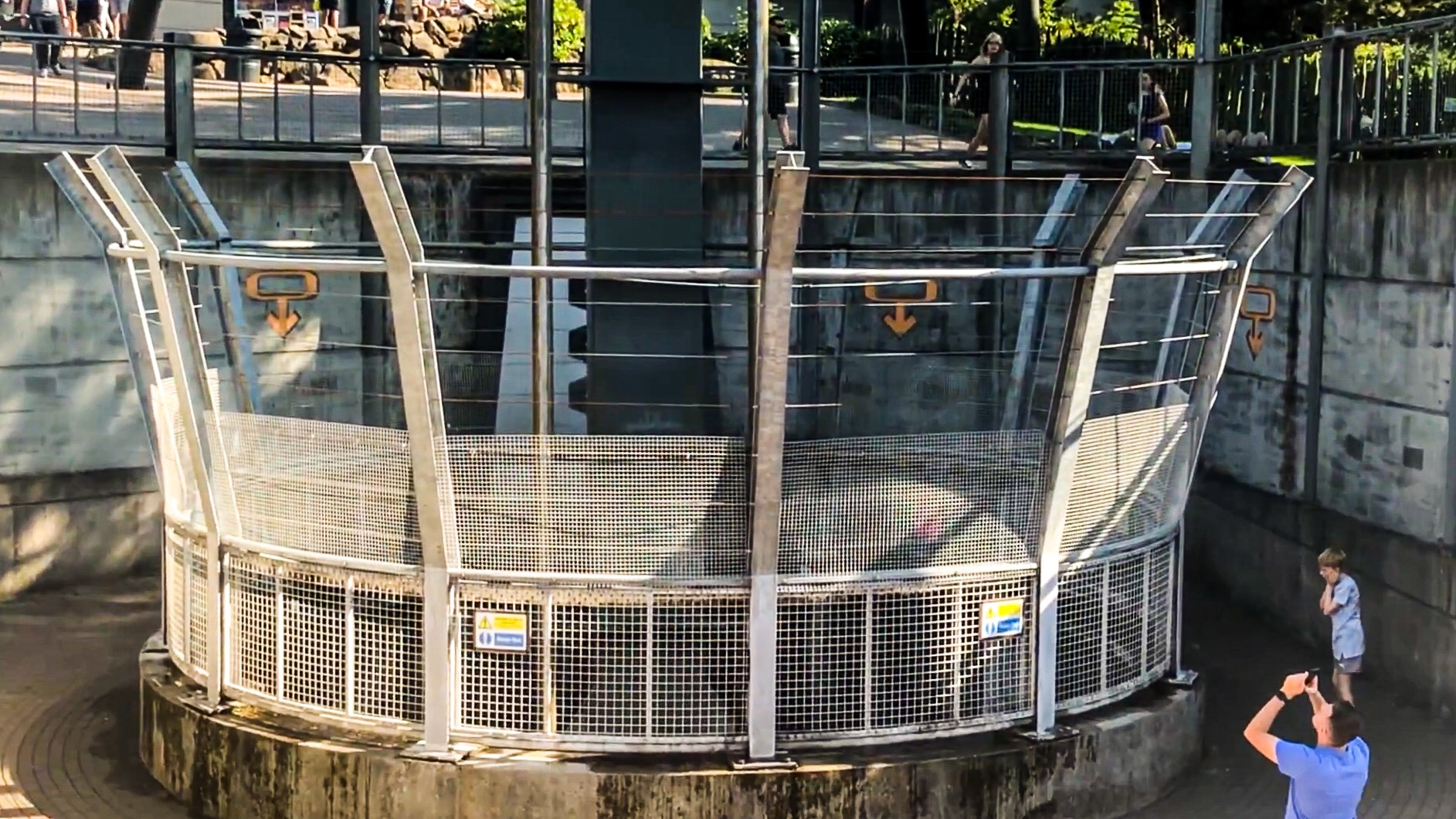
The tunnel entrance on Oblivion

Some roller coasters feature tunnels, which may incorporate special effects such as lighting, fog, and sound. Iron Rattler at Six Flags Fiesta Texas features fog and synchronized lighting in its quarry tunnel. The tunnel on Loch Ness Monster at Busch Gardens Williamsburg includes lighting, sound effects, and LED screens depicting the ride's namesake creature.

== Non-inverting track elements ==
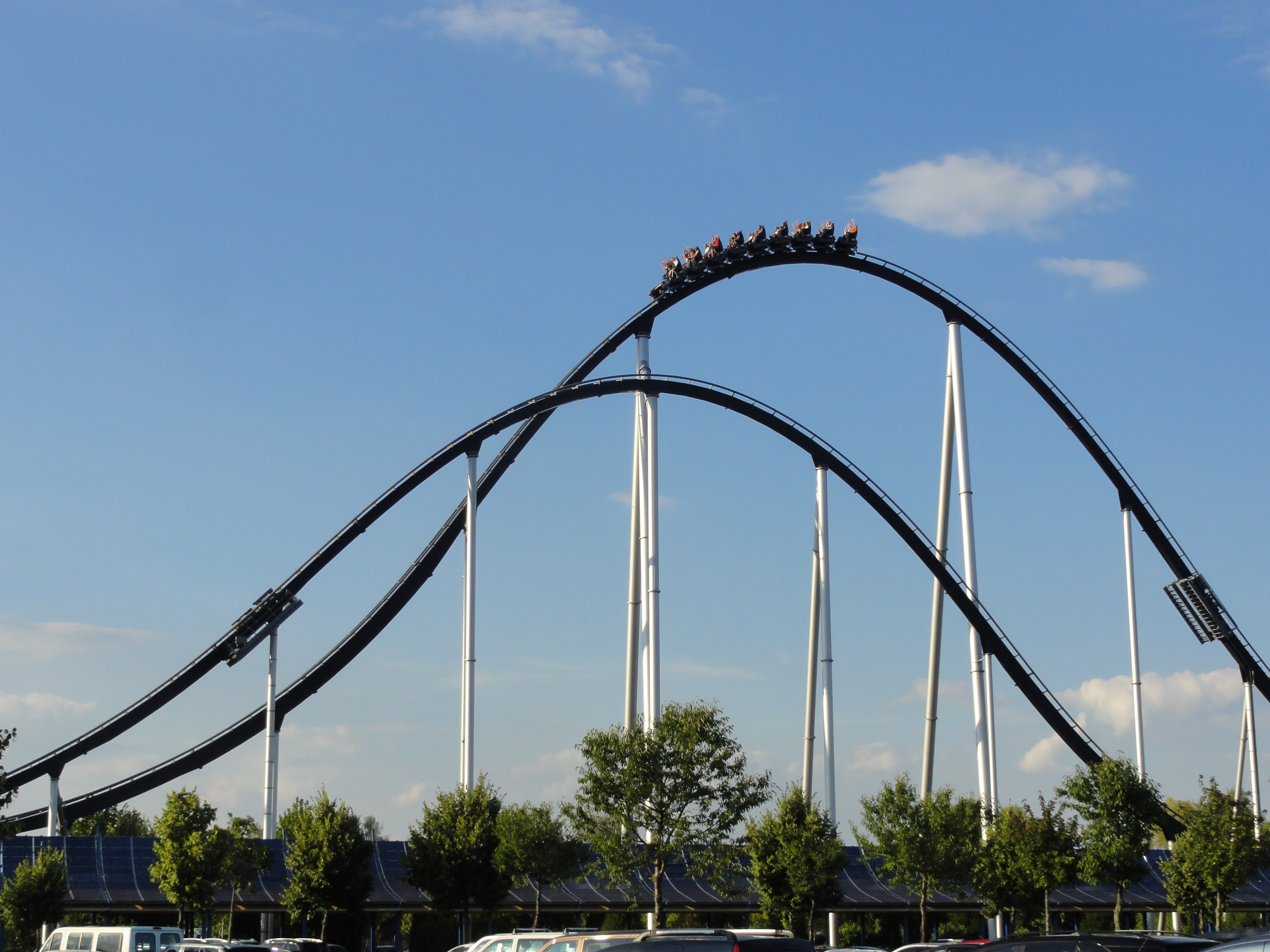
Camelback hills on Silver Star

=== Camelback ===
A camelback or camelback hill, also known as an airtime hill or bunny hop, is a hump-shaped hill that travels in a straight line and is designed to lift riders out of their seats to provide a feeling of weightlessness. The effect is commonly known as airtime, and camelbacks produce negative g-force to achieve the effect. The term has been used to describe a series of smaller hills typically found near the end of a track's layout, which is a common finale on older wooden coasters. A modern coaster's implementation of a camelback can be a much larger, single hill often found earlier in the track's layout.

=== Double dip ===
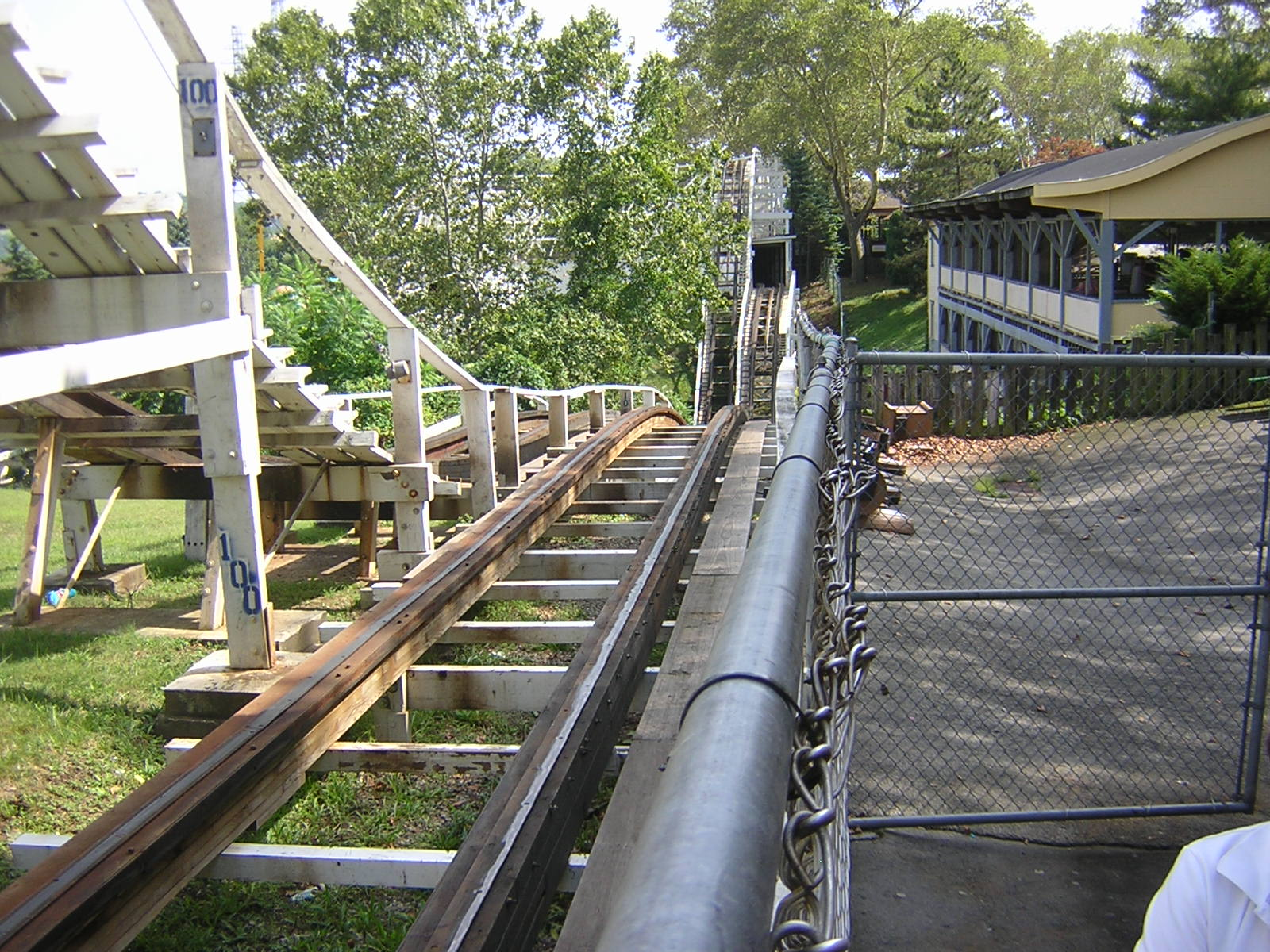
A double dip on Jack Rabbit

A double dip element, also known as a double drop or double down, is created when a hill is divided into two separate drops by a flattening out of the drop midway down the hill. Two notable rides featuring this element are Jack Rabbit located at Kennywood and Jack Rabbit located at Seabreeze, both of which are roller coasters designed by John A. Miller in 1920. The inverse of this element is known as a double up, where two inclines are separated by a level piece of track. Stampida at Portaventura Park is an example that incorporates both a double dip and a double up element.

=== Hammerhead turn ===
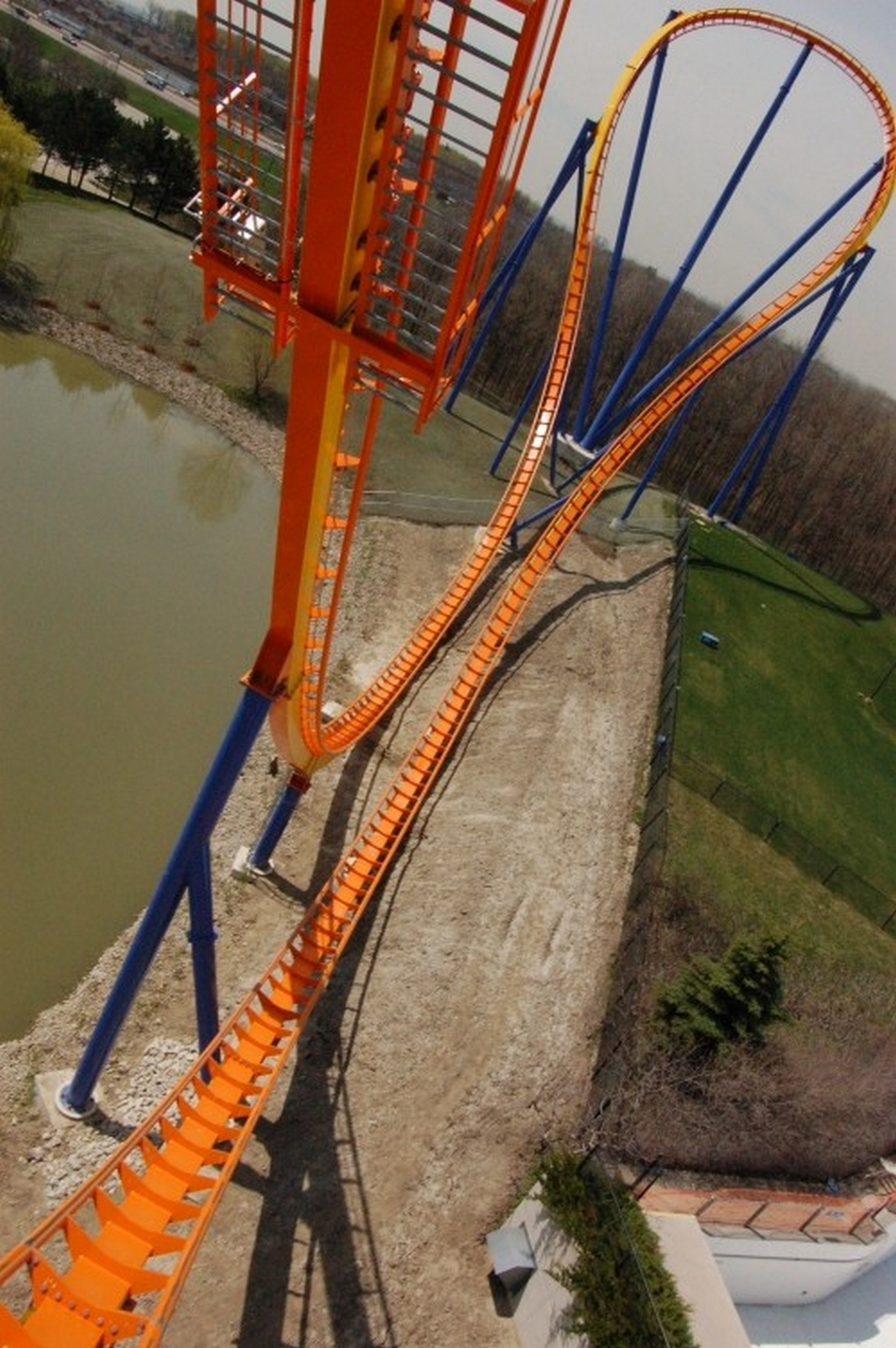
A hammerhead turn on Behemoth

A hammerhead turn is based on a flying maneuver by the same name and is similar to, but not the same as, a 180-degree overbanked turn. The train enters the element with a steep slope up and a slight curve in the direction opposite that of the overall turn (a so-called "priming" of the turn). The train then banks heavily to the side opposite the initial curve and finishes its climb while it negotiates the overall turn, beginning its descent midway through the turn. The second half of the element is the same as the first half, but in reverse order. While negotiating a hammerhead turn element, the train makes a turn of more than 180 degrees; however, because of the entry and exit curves, the overall effect is that of a 180-degree turn that exits toward the direction from which it entered, roughly parallel to the portion of track preceding the hammerhead turn. Hammerhead turns are found on some B&M hypercoasters. Examples of these coasters are Nitro at Six Flags Great Adventure, Behemoth at Canada's Wonderland, Diamondback at Kings Island and Mako at SeaWorld Orlando.

=== Horseshoe ===
A horseshoe is a type of turnaround maneuver found on Maurer Rides GmbH's Spinning Coaster model. The horseshoe is essentially a 180-degree turnaround with high banking so that riders are tilted at a 90-degree angle or more at the top at the element. The horseshoe is named that way because the element is shaped roughly like a horseshoe, with a semicircular shape at the top. It is found on coasters such as Dragon's Fury at Chessington World of Adventures and Laff Trakk at Hersheypark.

=== Junior Immelmann loop ===
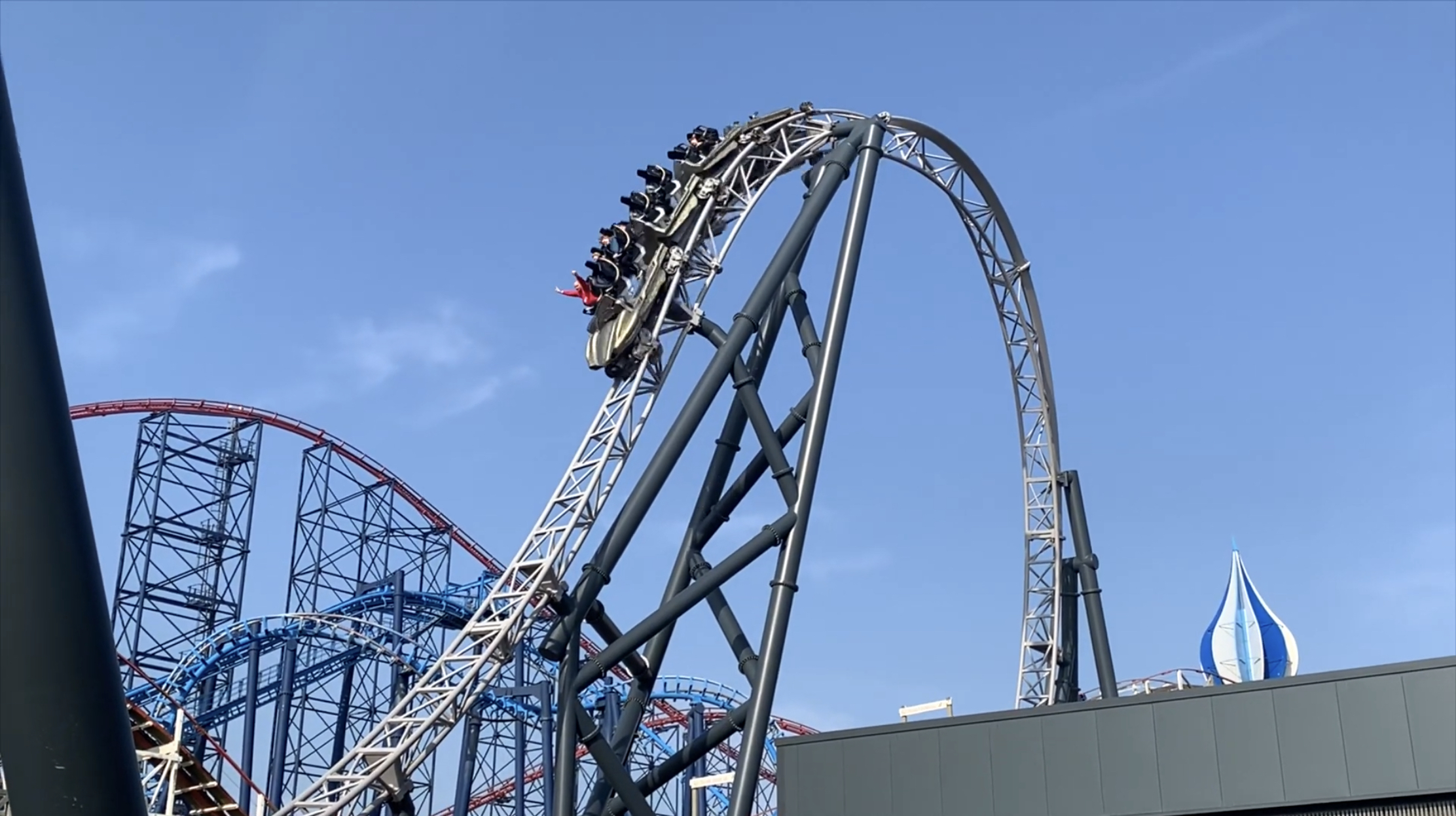
A junior Immelmann on Icon

A junior Immelmann loop is similar to a normal Immelmann loop, except riders are not inverted and only roll to 90 degrees instead of 180 degrees. The element first appeared on Black Mamba at Phantasialand.

=== Non-inverting cobra roll ===
A non-inverting cobra roll is similar to a cobra roll, except the half-loops at the entrance and exit level out before reaching 180 degrees, and the train therefore does not invert. Kondaa at Walibi Belgium is the only ride to feature this element.

=== Non-inverting loop ===
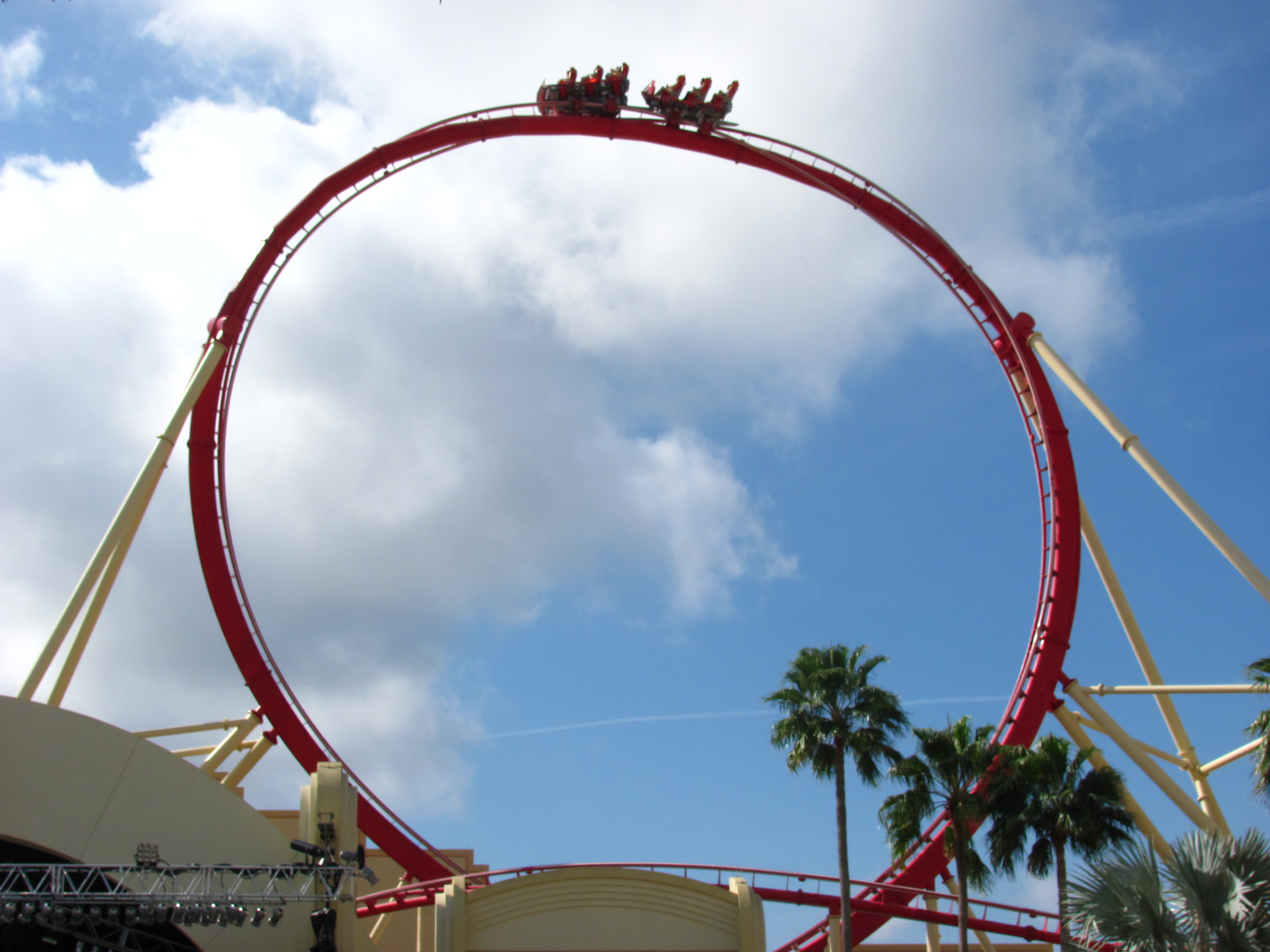
The non-inverting loop on Hollywood Rip Ride Rockit

The non-inverting loop is a variety of loop that, when coming up, twists similar to a heartline roll, leaving riders completely right-side-up when at the top of the loop. Some roller coasters with this element include Hollywood Rip Ride Rockit at Universal Studios Florida, Shock at Rainbow MagicLand, Superman: Ultimate Flight at Six Flags Discovery Kingdom, Flying Aces at Ferrari World, Soaring with Dragon at Hefei Wanda Theme Park, DC Rivals Hypercoaster at Warner Bros. Movie World and Tempesto at Busch Gardens Williamsburg.

=== Overbanked turn ===
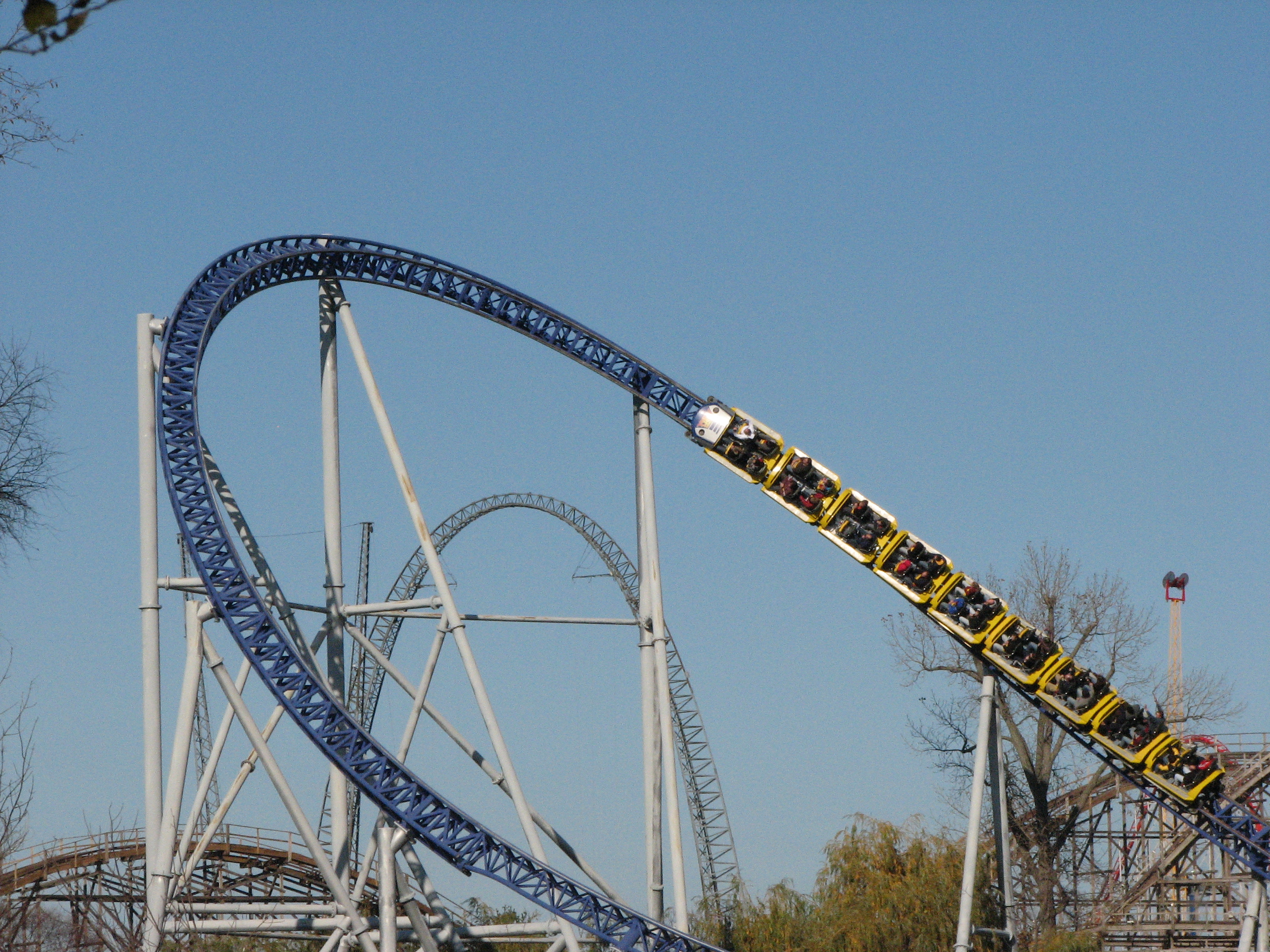
An overbanked turn on Millennium Force

An overbanked turn is a turn or curve in which the track tilts 90 degrees or more, often in the 100–120 degree range. The element is common on large steel roller coasters, particularly those built by Intamin and Rocky Mountain Construction. Two examples include the first turn-around on Superman the Ride at Six Flags New England and the overbanked turn that follows the barrel roll on Iron Gwazi at Busch Gardens Tampa Bay.

=== Stengel dive ===
A Stengel dive combines an overbanked turn with a camelback hill. The train first goes up a regular camelback hill, then quickly tilts beyond 90 degrees at the very top. It is the only roller coaster element named after its designer, in this case Werner Stengel. Examples of roller coasters that feature this element include Goliath at Walibi Holland and Thunderbolt at Luna Park.

=== Speed hill ===
A speed hill, also known as a high-speed float, is an airtime element commonly found in Bolliger & Mabillard steel coasters and Rocky Mountain Construction wooden coasters. The element is a mini-version of camelback entered at a high speed, which results in significant negative G-forces that exceed a typical camelback. Leviathan at Canada's Wonderland and Outlaw Run at Silver Dollar City are two roller coasters that feature this element.

=== Top hat ===
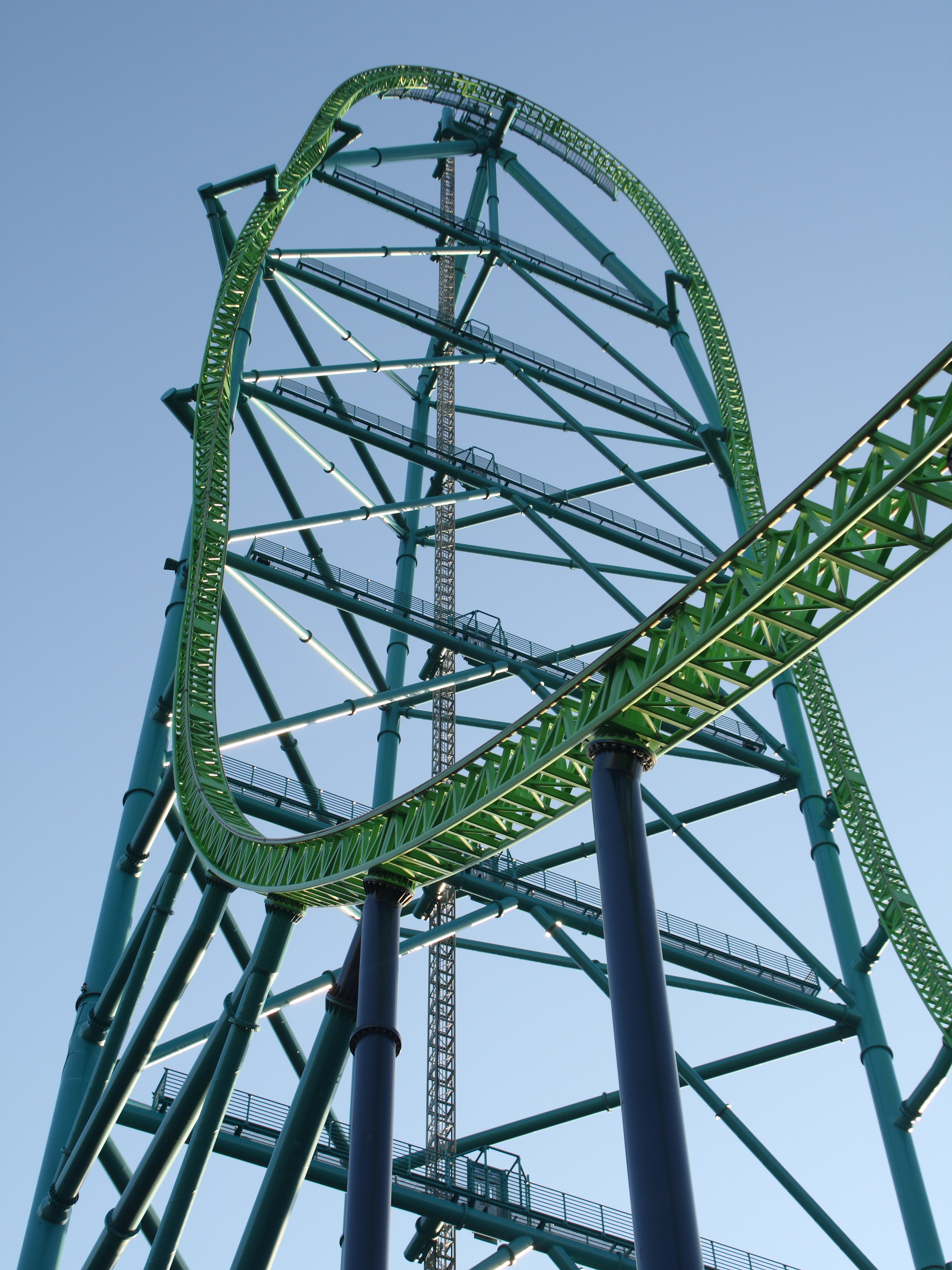
The top hat element on the now-defunct Kingda Ka

A top hat, also known as top cap, is an element consisting of a 90-degree ascent up a tall hill followed by a 90-degree descent, with the train usually exiting in the opposite direction from which it entered. Top hats are commonly found on launched coasters, and in a standard configuration, the track twists so that the train does not invert during the ride. Top Thrill 2 at Cedar Point — the only remaining strata coaster in existence after the closure of Kingda Ka at Six Flags Great Adventure in 2024 — features a top hat element.

In a top hat inversion, also called an inside top hat or inverted top hat, the track makes a 90-degree twist as the train approaches the top. The train travels on the inside of the element, and once it reaches the apex, the train becomes inverted. Mr. Freeze Reverse Blast at Six Flags St. Louis is an example that features this variant.

=== Wave turn ===
A wave turn, commonly found on Rocky Mountain Construction roller coasters, is a 90-degree banked turn that incorporates a small camelback hill. The airtime feature separates wave turns from typical banked turns. When a train banks either right or left into an inclined turn, it traverses an airtime hill while banked at 90 degrees. The element finishes with the train exiting in the opposite direction that it entered.

== Inverting elements ==
=== Banana roll ===
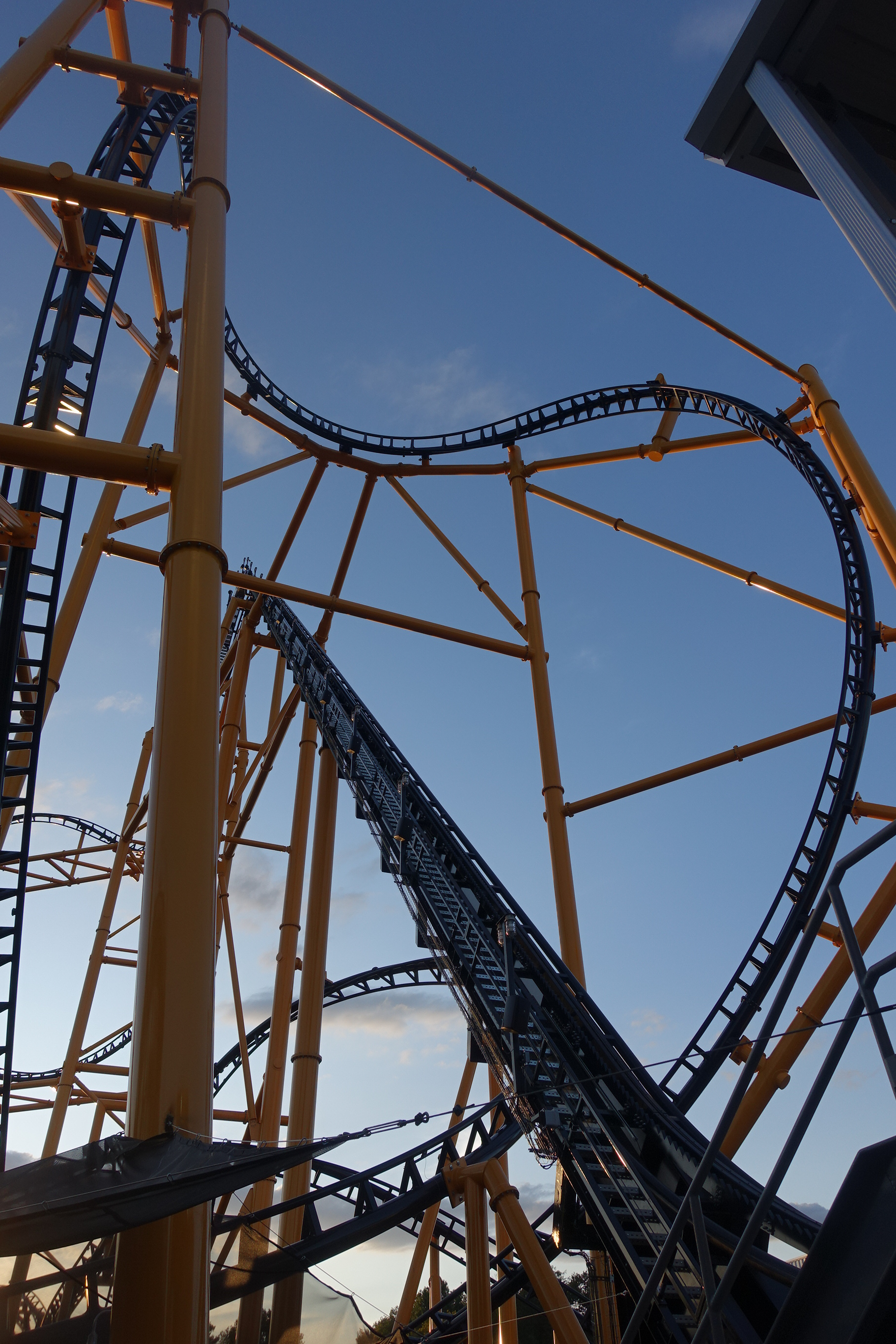
The banana roll on Steel Curtain

A banana roll is an inversion element similar to an elongated cobra roll and is named after its shape. Unlike a cobra roll, the banana roll only inverts riders once. The element first appeared on Takabisha at Fuji-Q Highland in 2011, and it also appears on TMNT Shellraiser at Nickelodeon Universe and Steel Curtain at Kennywood.

=== Batwing ===
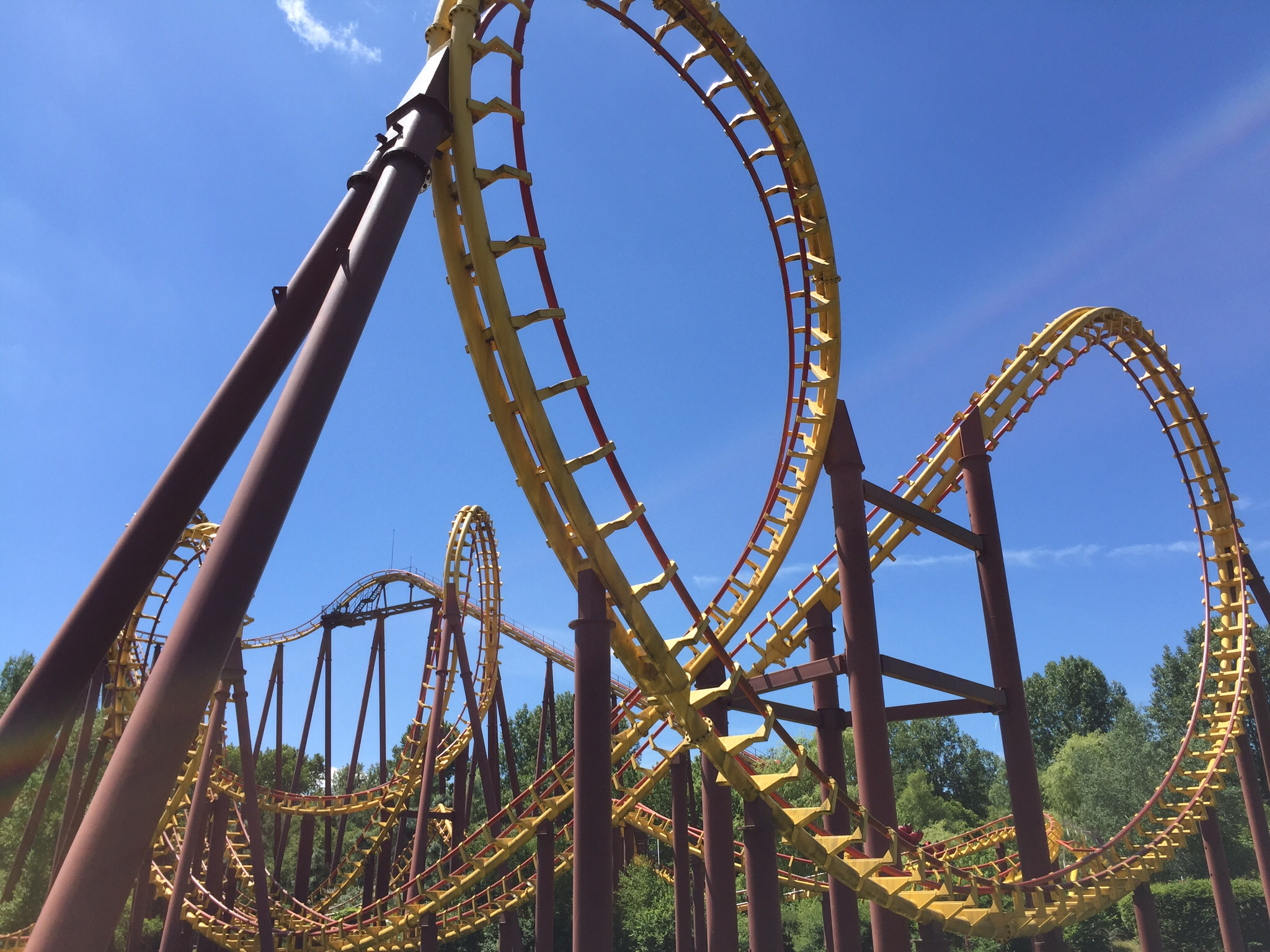
A batwing on Goudurix

A batwing is a heart-shaped roller coaster element that features two inversions. The train goes into a reverse sidewinder, followed by a sidewinder. It is the inverse of a cobra roll. Like other inversions, this element has different names depending on the roller coaster's manufacturer. It is most commonly known as a batwing, which is the term used by Bolliger & Mabillard (B&M). Afterburn at Carowinds and Montu at Busch Gardens Tampa Bay are two examples that feature this element. It was first marketed as a Kamikaze Kurve by Arrow Dynamics during the construction of Orient Express at Worlds of Fun, which opened in 1980. Arrow Dynamics would later refer to the element as a boomerang in future projects, such as the defunct Great American Scream Machine at Six Flags Great Adventure. One variation of the batwing is known as a bowtie, where the entrance and exit of the inversion are in the same direction. Dragon Mountain at Marineland of Canada was the only coaster to feature this element, according to the Roller Coaster DataBase.

=== Bent Cuban eight ===
A bent Cuban eight is a double inversion element that features two "bent and twisted" Immelmann loops that are connected back to back. Designed by Maurer Rides GmbH, the element only appears on two X-Car roller coaster models from the company, including G Force, formerly located at Drayton Manor Theme Park.

=== Butterfly ===
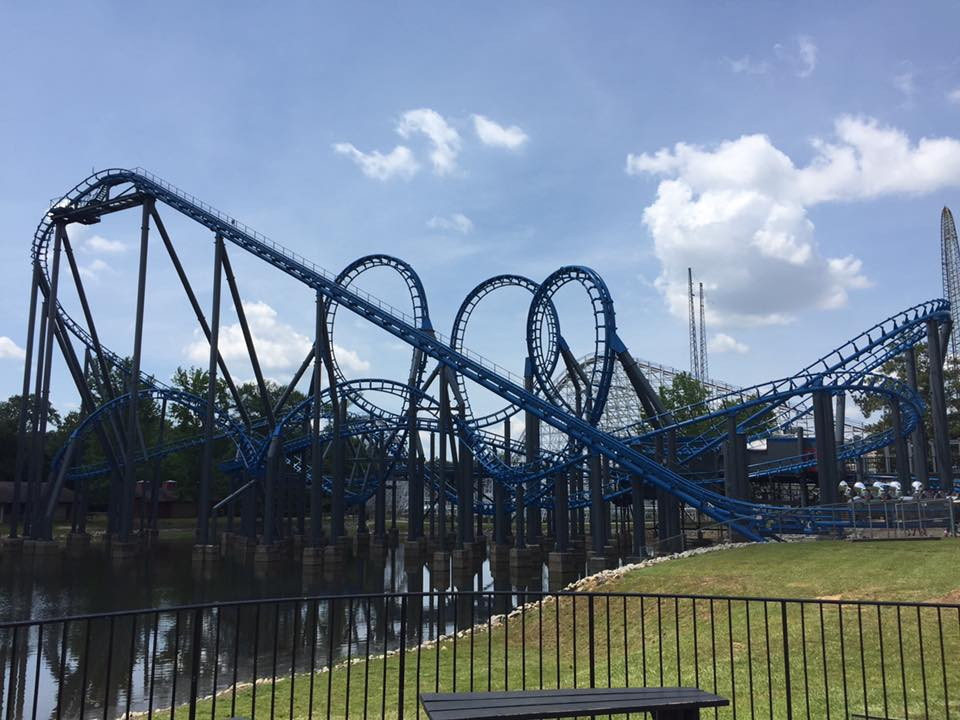
A butterfly element on Blue Hawk (can be seen near the middle)

A butterfly is sometimes found on Vekoma roller coasters. A butterfly begins like a vertical loop, but as the track goes up, it twists 45 degrees to one side or the other, and then when it is headed down the track twists back. The maneuver is then repeated but in reverse. It is essentially the same in construction as a batwing or boomerang except for the coaster exiting the construct traveling in the same direction as it began. Examples include Goudurix at Parc Astérix and Blue Hawk at Six Flags Over Georgia.

=== Cobra roll ===
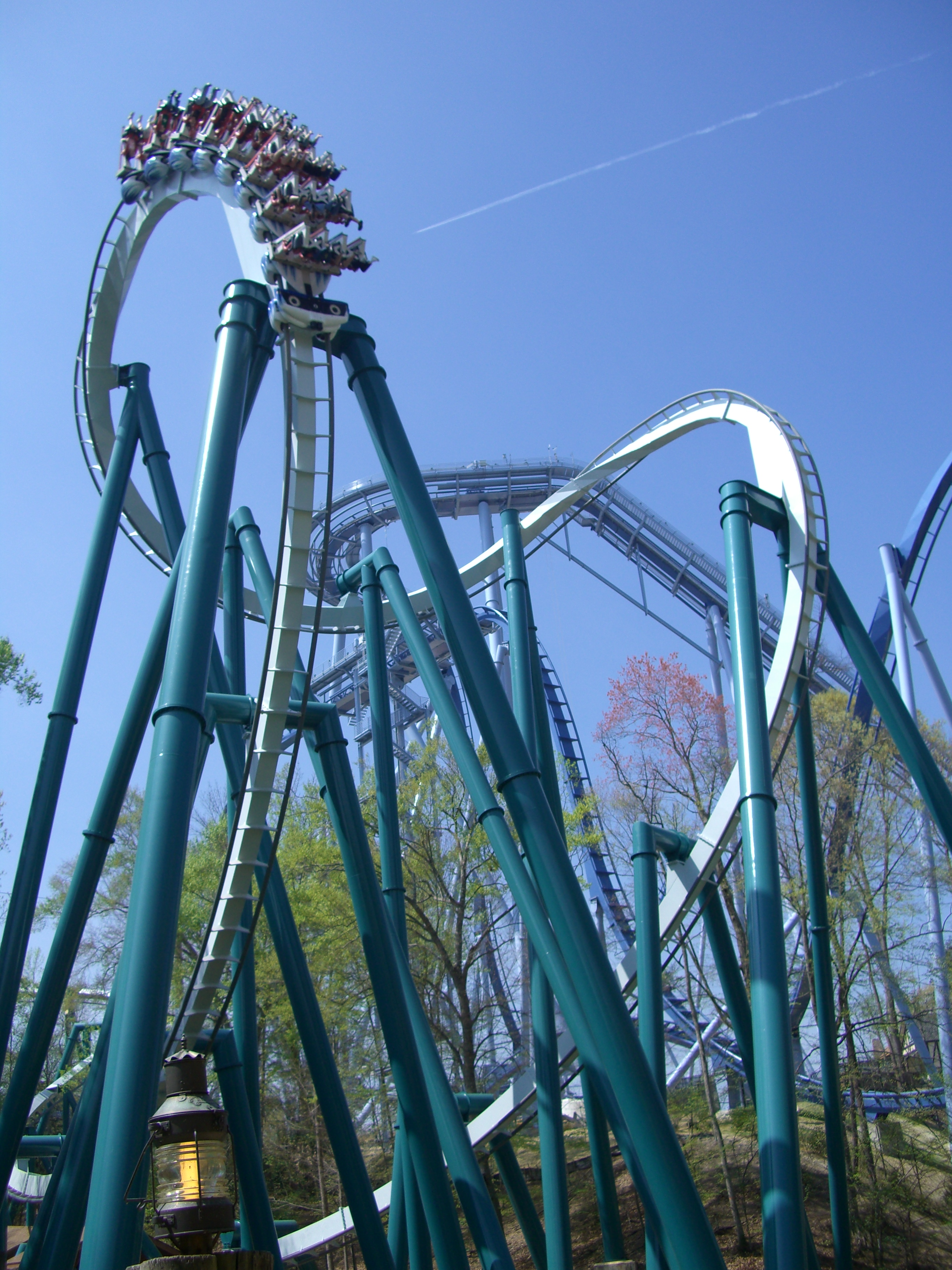
A cobra roll on Alpengeist

The cobra roll is a roller coaster inversion that resembles the shape of a cobra head when flaring its hood. The element consists of two half vertical loops facing the same direction joined by two half corkscrews that each twist in opposite directions. As the train completes the first half loop, it turns perpendicular into a half corkscrew, completing a first inversion. This is immediately followed by another half corkscrew that twists in the opposite direction into the other half vertical loop, completing a second inversion. The train exits the cobra roll traveling in the opposite direction from which it entered.

Vekoma's Boomerang was the first model to incorporate a cobra roll, and the first Boomerang installation was Sea Serpent at Morey's Piers in 1984.

=== Corkscrew ===
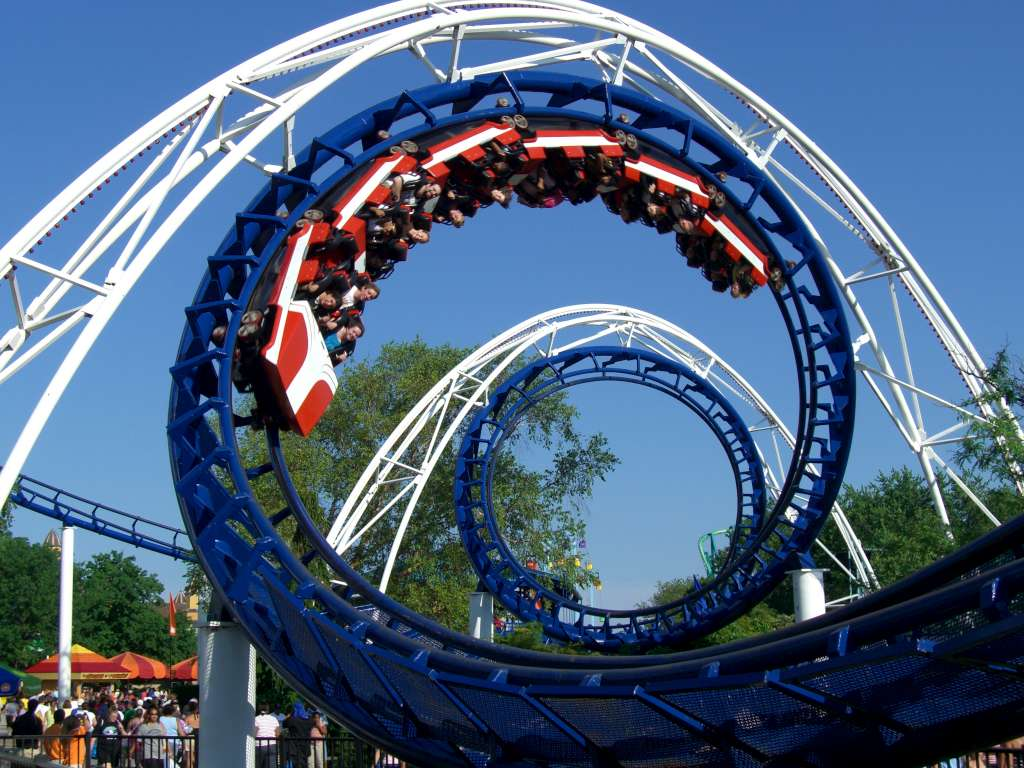
A corkscrew on the Cedar Point ride of the same name

A corkscrew inversion resembles a helix that rotates riders 360 degrees perpendicular to the track. It was named for its resemblance of a corkscrew tool used to remove bottle corks. Unlike vertical loops, riders face forward for the duration of the inversion. The corkscrew was the first modern-day coaster inversion element. It first appeared in 1975 on a roller coaster of the same name at Knott's Berry Farm, designed by Arrow Dynamics. The element was well-received and became a staple of many early roller coasters that inverted riders.

Corkscrews commonly exist in pairs, where the end of one leads straight into the next. Another configuration involves interlocking corkscrews, where two corkscrews are intertwined, with each crossing over the other's track. Both Nemesis Inferno at Thorpe Park and Medusa at Six Flags Great Adventure feature interlocking corkscrews. Bolliger & Mabillard introduced a variation of the corkscrew that they call a flat spin, where riders are quickly snapped through the inversion at varying speeds, as opposed to a standard corkscrew that rotates riders at slower, constant speeds.

=== Cutback ===
A cutback is an inversion similar to a corkscrew, except the second half of the element is reversed. The train exits the inversion in the opposite direction from which it entered. Arrow Dynamics debuted the feature on Drachen Fire at Busch Gardens Williamsburg in 1992. It can also be found on other coasters such as Twisted Timbers at Kings Dominion, Steel Curtain at Kennywood, and Wonder Woman Golden Lasso Coaster at Six Flags Fiesta Texas.

=== Dive drop ===
A dive drop (also known as a wing over drop) is a roller coaster inversion in which a half-inline twist is performed at the top of a lift hill, leading into the initial drop. These elements are most common on wing coasters, including The Swarm at Thorpe Park, X-Flight at Six Flags Great America, and GateKeeper at Cedar Point.

=== Dive loop ===
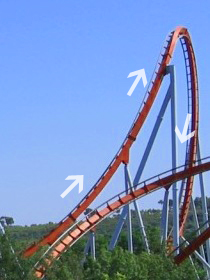
A dive loop on Dragon Khan

A dive loop, or diving loop, is a roller coaster inversion whose inspiration was taken from a stunt plane maneuver. It is the reverse of an Immelmann loop, where the track twists upward and to the side followed by a dive toward the ground in a half-vertical loop. This element is commonly found on B&M and Gerstlauer roller coasters. Arrow Dynamics and Vekoma feature a similar version of the inversion they call a reverse sidewinder, which can be found in Arrow Dynamics' Gold Coaster at Dreamworld in Australia and Vekoma's Blue Hawk at Six Flags Over Georgia.

=== Finnish loop ===
A Finnish loop consists of a twisted dive followed by a vertical loop. It was first used by Gerstlauer at Power Park's Junker in 2015.

=== Heartline roll ===
An inline twist (left) versus a heartline roll (right)

A heartline roll, also known as a barrel roll, is a 360-degree roller coaster inversion that rotates at the center of the train on one axis. The focus of the element is keeping the train moving in a straight line, which is accomplished by having the track change in elevation – rising and falling – throughout the inversion. From the rider's point of view, the rotation occurs near the chest, hence the name "heartline roll". Colossus at Thorpe Park notably features five heartline rolls. In a similar element known as an in-line twist, the track remains at the same elevation throughout the inversion, producing a different point of rotation that is either above or below the rider's point of view.

=== Immelmann loop ===
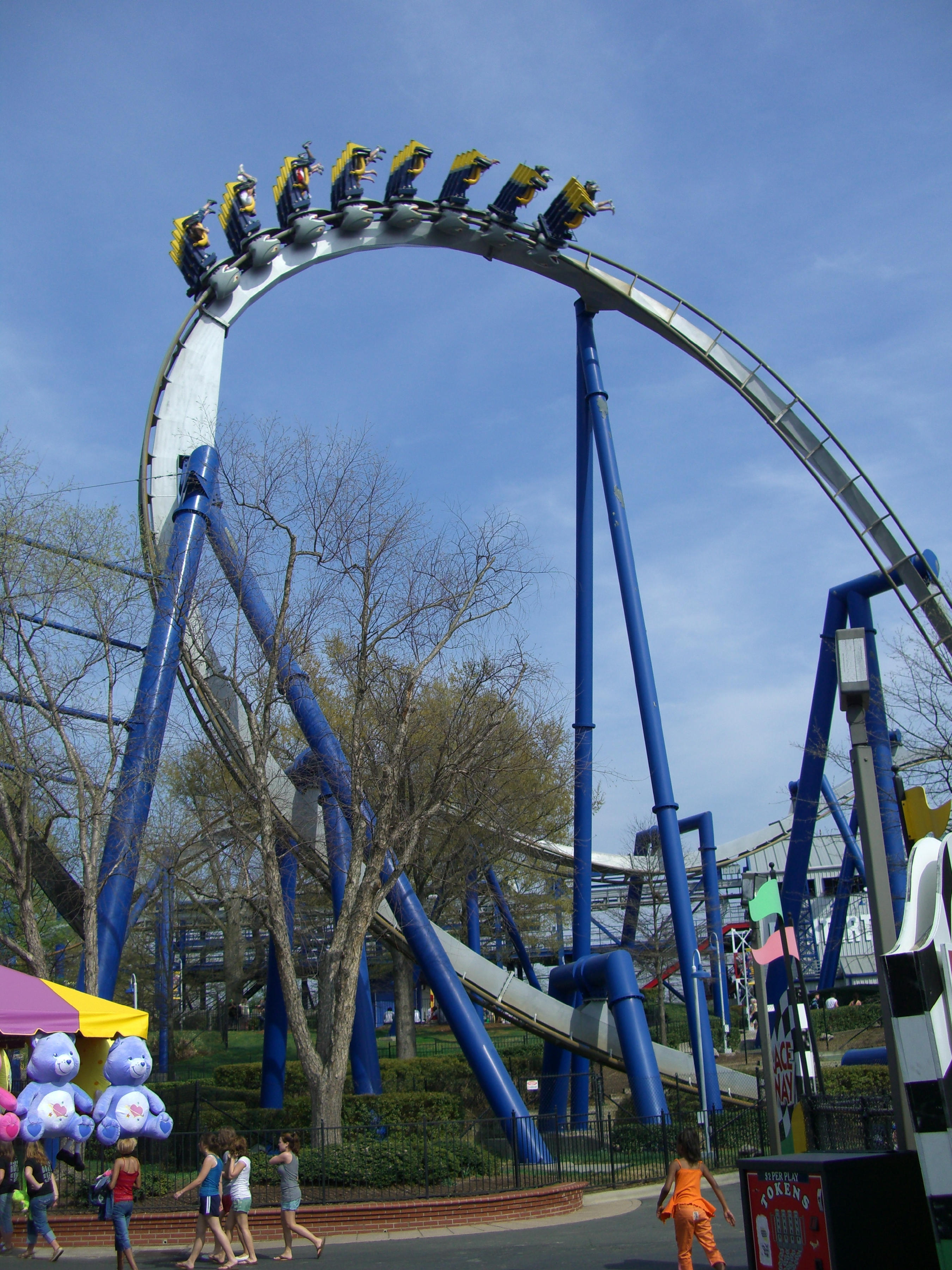
An immelmann loop on Afterburn

An Immelmann loop is a popular inversion found on many B&M roller coasters. In an Immelmann loop, riders enter a half-loop followed by a half twist, and then exit the element traveling in the opposite direction making a 180-degree turn. The inversion is similar to a sidewinder which exits closer to 90°, or perpendicular to the entrance point.

An Immelmann loop becomes a dive loop if the entrance and exit points are reversed. The name "Immelmann" comes from the Immelmann turn, an aircraft maneuver named after the World War I German fighter pilot Max Immelmann. Immelmanns are commonly found as the first element on B&M Dive Coasters. A notable example is Valravn at Cedar Point, which has an Immelmann loop immediately following the first drop.

=== Inclined dive loop ===
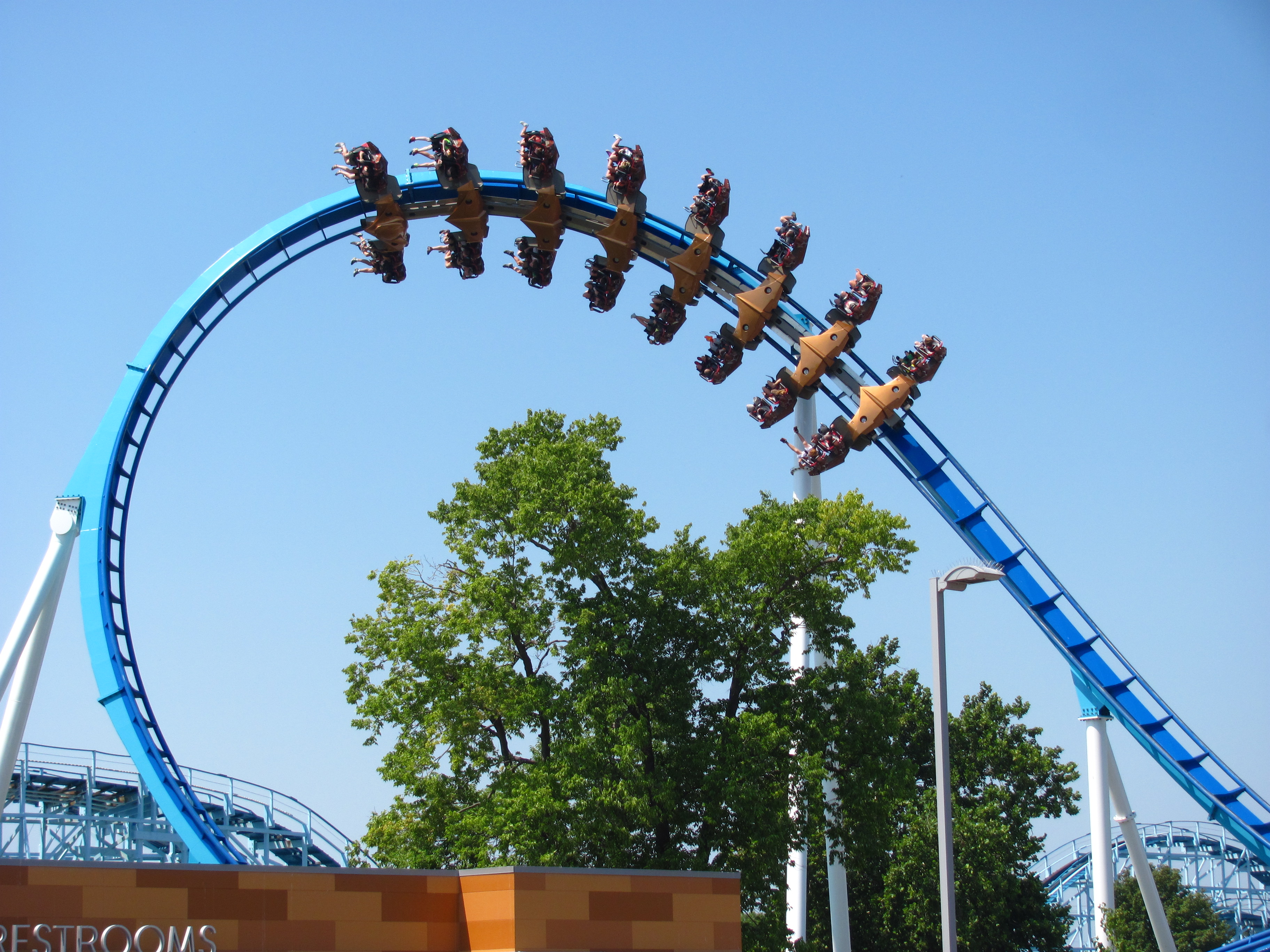
An inclined dive loop on GateKeeper

An inclined dive loop is essentially a dive loop that has been tilted. Instead of exiting vertically, an inclined dive loop exits at an angle. The only two examples are on Hydra the Revenge at Dorney Park & Wildwater Kingdom and GateKeeper at Cedar Point.

=== Inclined loop ===
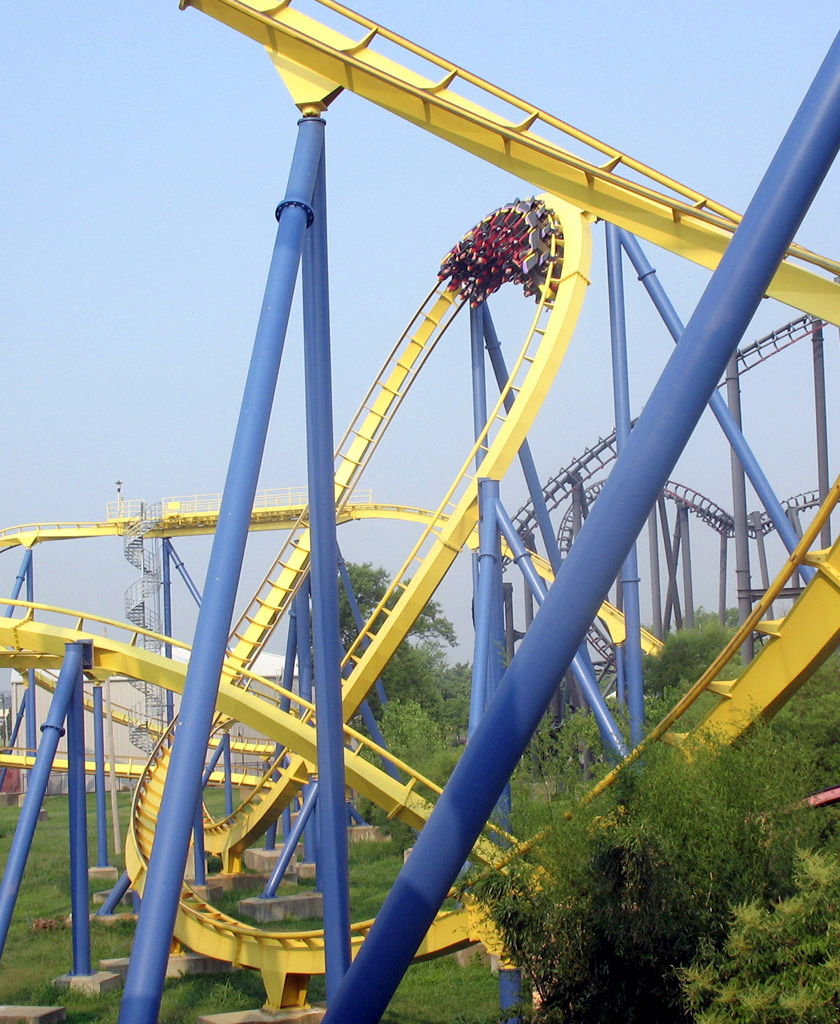
An inclined loop on the now-defunct Chang

An inclined loop, also known as an oblique loop, is a 360° loop that has been tilted at an angle. It is not entered vertically, like a vertical loop, or horizontally like a helix. Instead, it is usually entered at an angle between 45° and 80°. Inclined loops can be found on B&M stand-up roller coasters, B&M Wing Coasters, and B&M Floorless Coasters. Examples include: Rougarou at Cedar Point; Riddler's Revenge at Six Flags Magic Mountain; and The Swarm at Thorpe Park.

=== In-line twist ===
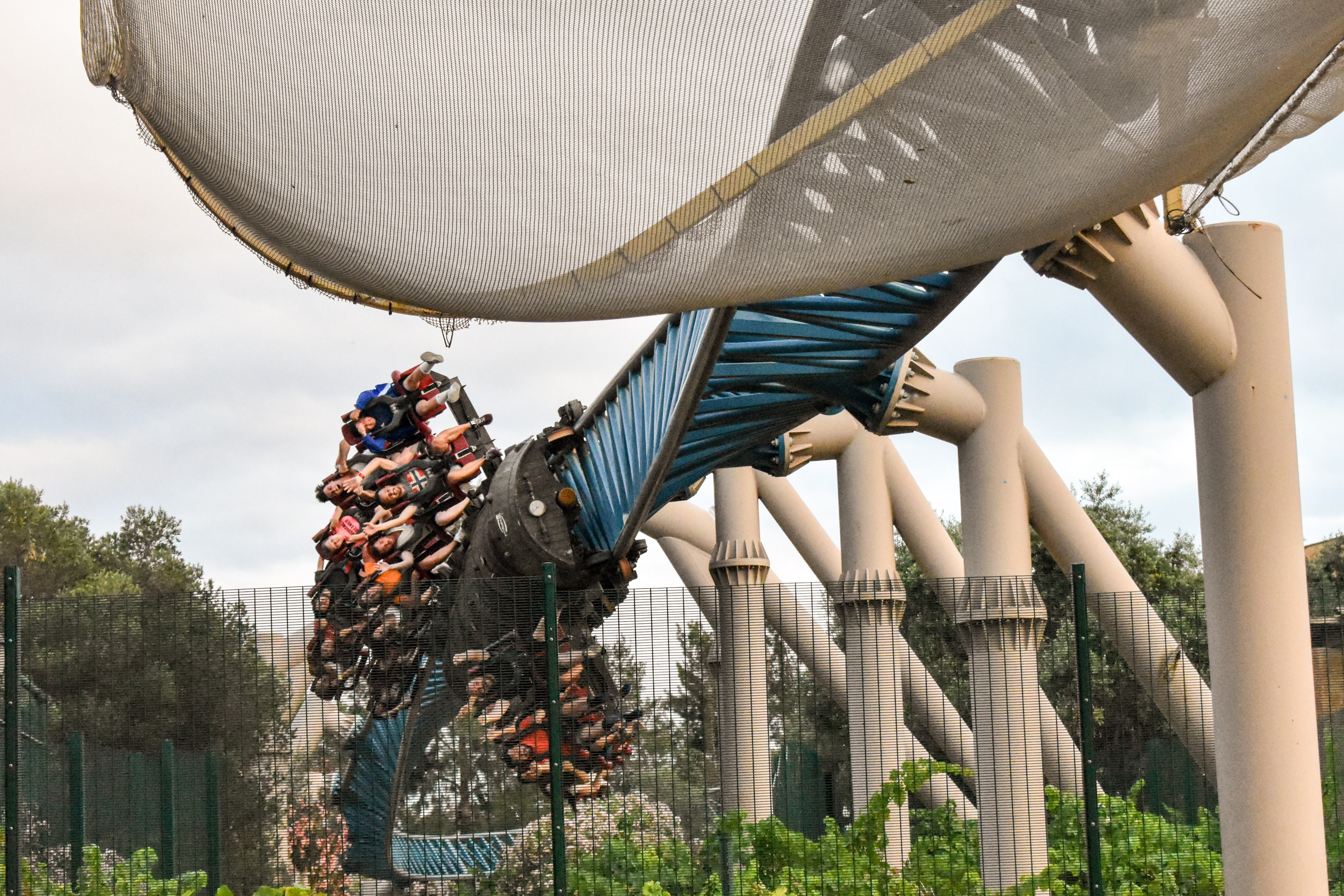
An in-line twist on Furius Baco

An in-line twist is a roller coaster inversion in which the vehicle performs a 360-degree roll. The in-line twist is often found on flying coasters and wing coasters, such as Galactica at Alton Towers, Batwing at Six Flags America, Superman: Ultimate Flight at Six Flags Over Georgia, Firehawk at Kings Island, Manta at SeaWorld Orlando, and Raptor at Gardaland. It can be confused with a heartline roll, also known as a barrel roll. In a heartline roll the center of the train rotates on one axis so the height of the average rider's heart never changes, whereas during an in-line twist the train rotates around the track and there is usually little to no elevation difference in the track. It can also provide hangtime.

=== Norwegian loop ===
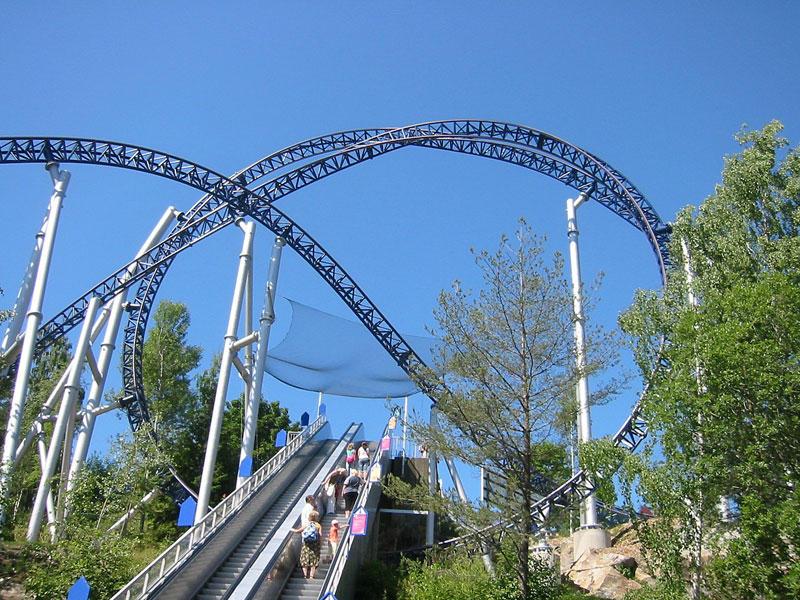
A Norwegian loop on SpeedMonster

A Norwegian loop is an element made out of two elements: a dive loop, then an Immelmann; forming an inversion that looks like two side by side loops. This element is similar to the flying coasters pretzel loop, except that the train goes through a twist when entering and exiting the loop. It may also been seen as a normal loop entered from the top. It was first introduced on Speed Monster in TusenFryd, Norway (hence why it is called a "Norwegian" Loop). Other examples of a Norwegian Loop can be found on Hersheypark's roller coaster Fahrenheit and Helix at Liseberg.

=== Pretzel knot ===
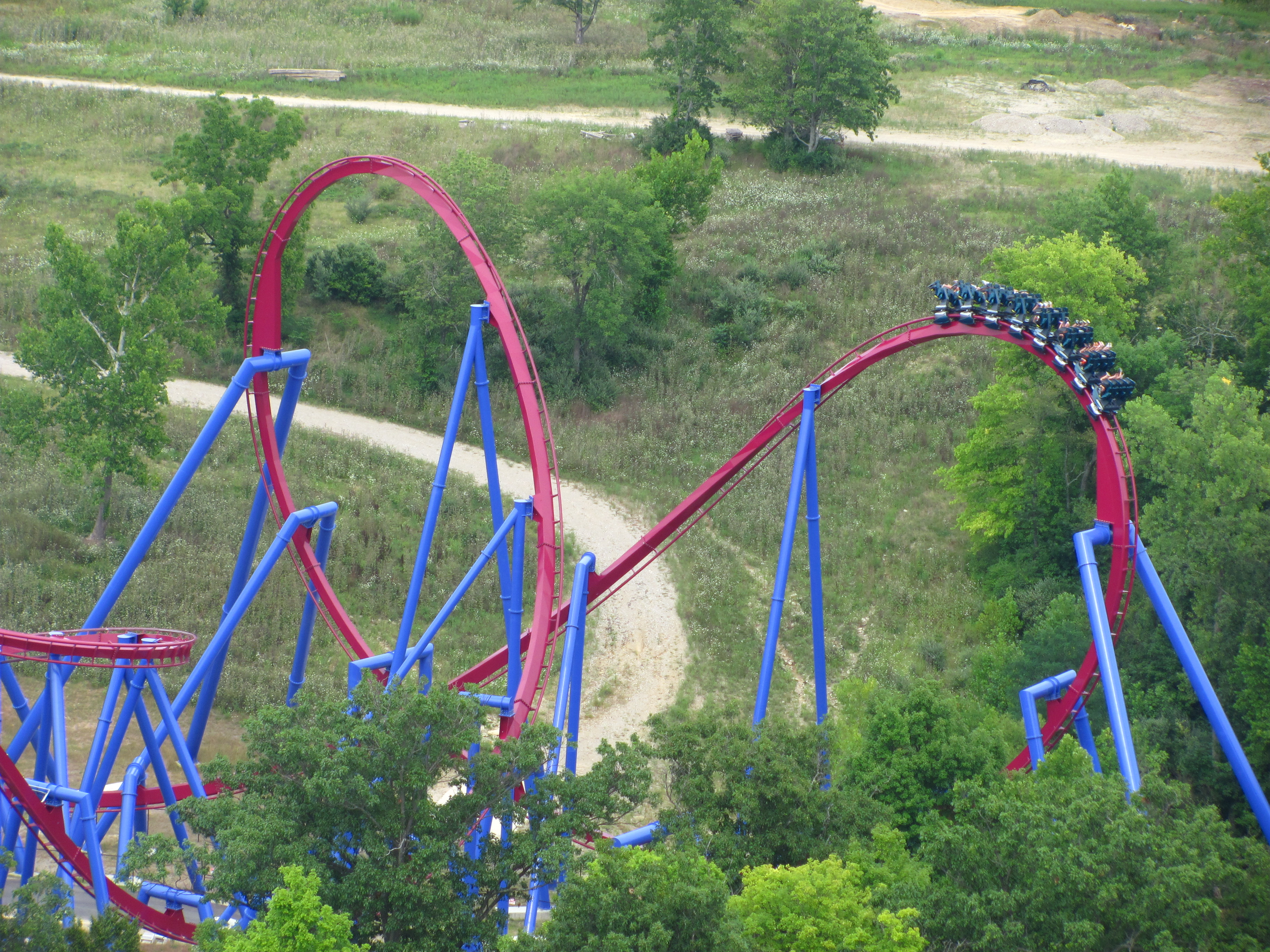
A pretzel knot on Banshee

A pretzel knot is an element similar to the batwing, except the entrance and exit of the inversion is formed differently. In a pretzel knot, the twisted formation of the element's entrance and exit resembles a pretzel shape as opposed to a batwing's heart shape. The defunct Moonsault Scramble at Fuji-Q Highland was the first coaster to feature this element. The second was Banshee at Kings Island.

=== Pretzel loop ===
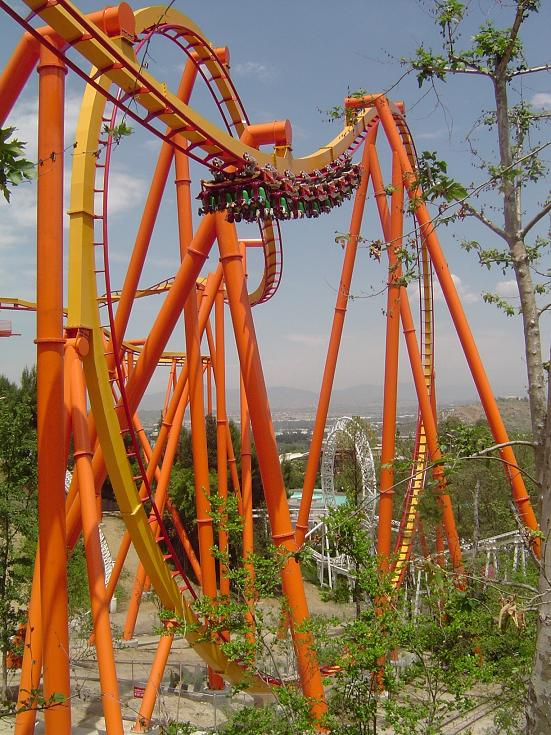
A pretzel loop on Tatsu

The pretzel loop is a large inversion found on flying coasters from Bolliger & Mabillard. The element debuted on Superman: Ultimate Flight at Six Flags Over Georgia and has been used on many other B&M flying coasters since then. It consists of a downward half loop and upward half loop. The entrance and exit points of the loop overlap at its peak forming a shape resembling a pretzel.

=== Raven turn ===
A raven turn is a half-inversion which looks like half a loop followed by a drop and then levels out near the same height as it began. The raven turn is only usable on either flying roller coasters or 4D roller coasters at the moment and has only been used on three 4D coasters and one flying coaster.

The general term raven turn refers to any inversion that follows the design described above; however, there are two types of raven turns. Assuming the train is going round the half-loop first, an inside raven turn is where the rails are below the train at the start whereas an outside raven turn is one in which the rails are above the train at the start of the element. X2 at Six Flags Magic Mountain, Eejanaika at Fuji-Q Highland, and Dinoconda at China Dinosaurs Park feature examples of raven turns.

=== Roll over ===
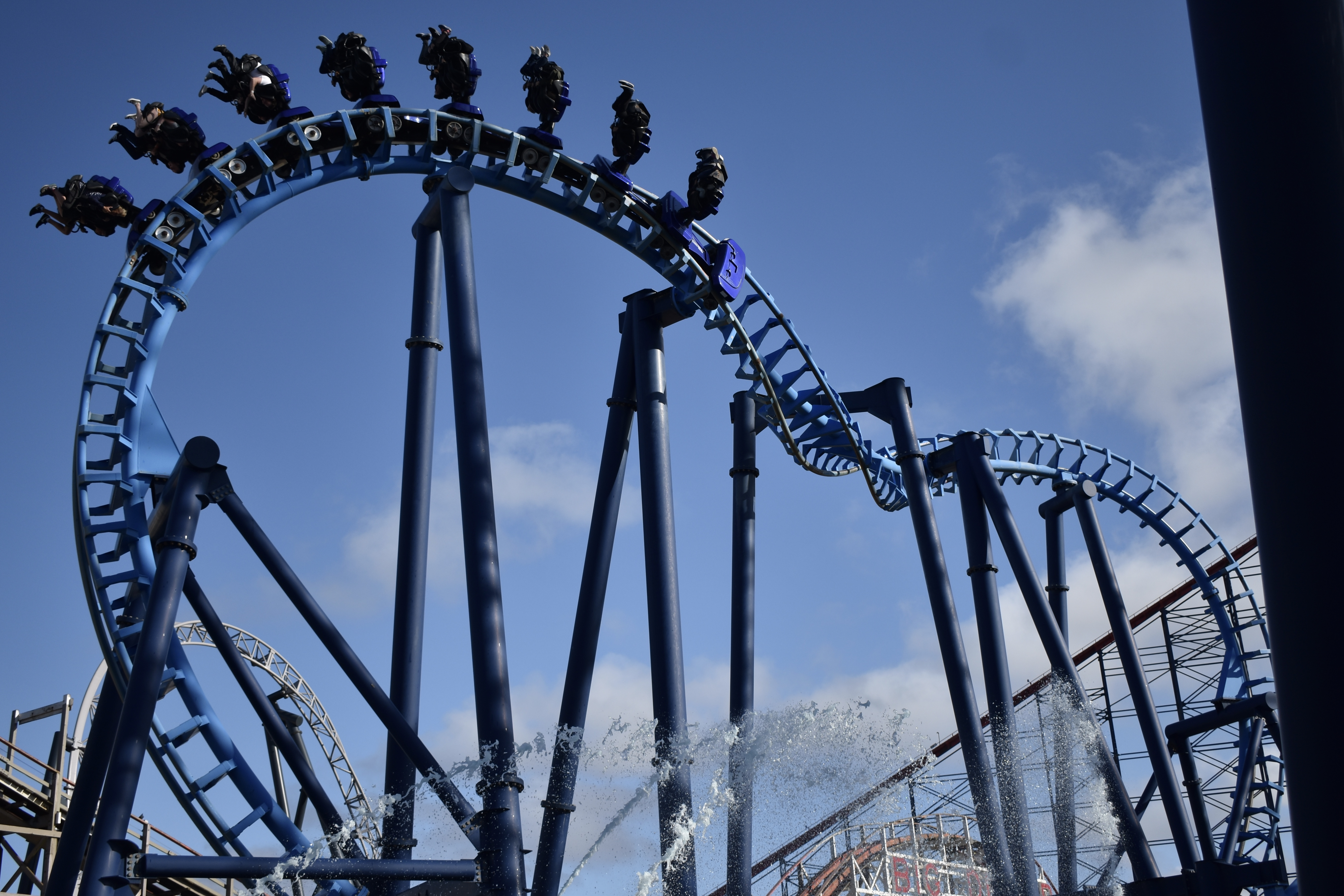
A roll over on Infusion

This element, known as a roll over on roller coasters built by Vekoma, is an inversion featuring two half loop halves, connected by two opposite-facing half inline twists. This inversion can be found on most Vekoma SLCs.

=== Sea serpent ===
The sea serpent is a roller coaster element with two inversions similar to a cobra roll, but the train enters and exit in the same direction. It features two vertical loop halves connected by two half corkscrews that face in opposite directions. The second half loop is on the opposite side in comparison to a cobra roll, which changes the exit's direction. Examples featuring this element include Vekoma's Rock 'n' Roller Coaster located at Disney's Hollywood Studios and The Smiler at Alton Towers.

=== Sidewinder ===
A sidewinder is an inversion element where riders enter a half-loop followed by a half-corkscrew, and then exit the element perpendicular to the direction in which they entered. The element is commonly found on Arrow Dynamics and Vekoma roller coasters. It is similar to the Immelmann loop, with the exception that riders exit in a different direction usually 90 degrees from the entrance point. When travelled in reverse it is simply a Reverse Sidewinder.

=== Twisted horseshoe roll ===
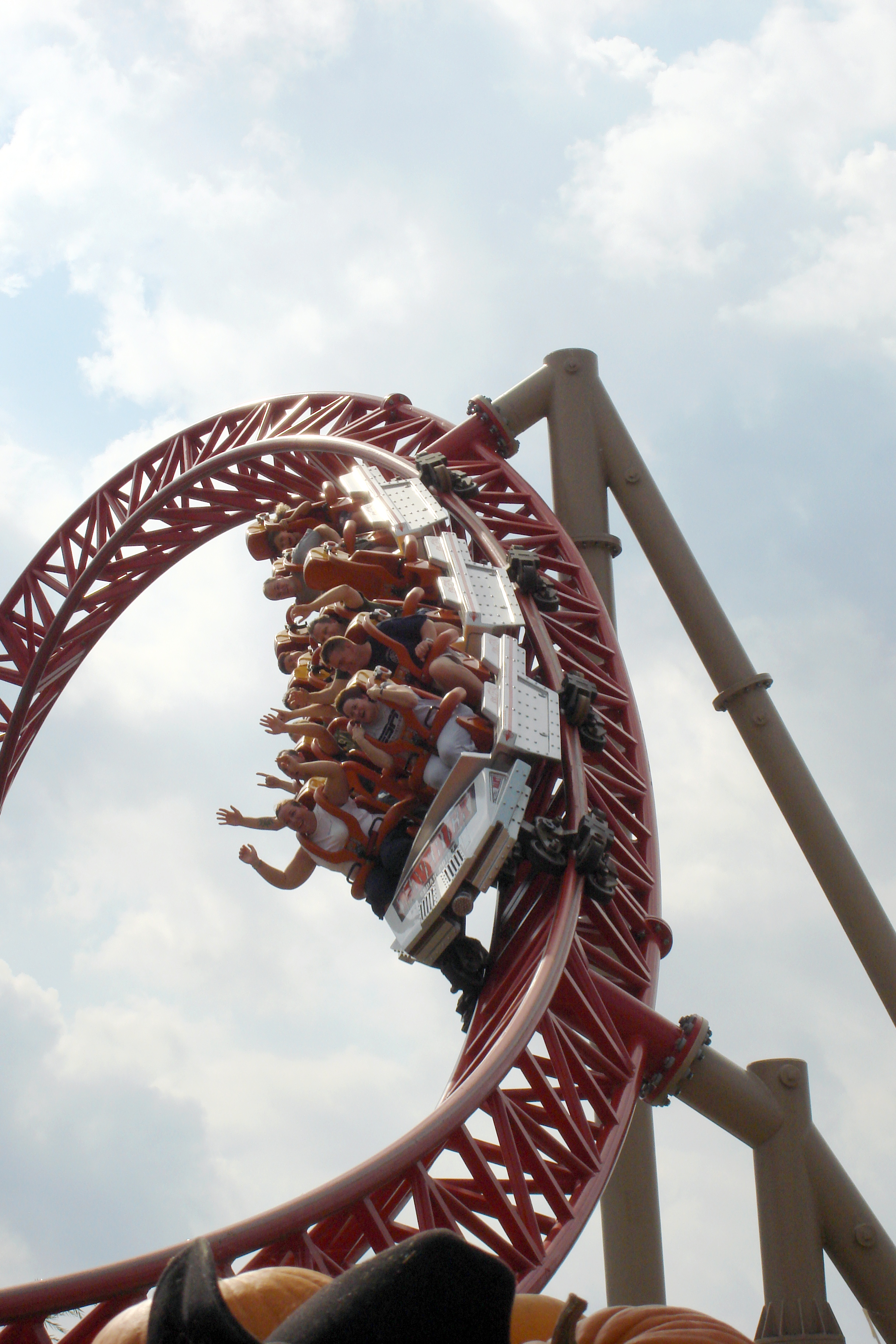
A twisted horseshoe roll on Maverick

A twisted horseshoe roll is an inversion element that begins with a corkscrew that leads into a 180-degree banked turn and ends with another corkscrew that rotates in the opposite direction as the first. Two roller coasters that feature this element are Maverick at Cedar Point and Blue Fire at Europa-Park.

=== Vertical loop ===
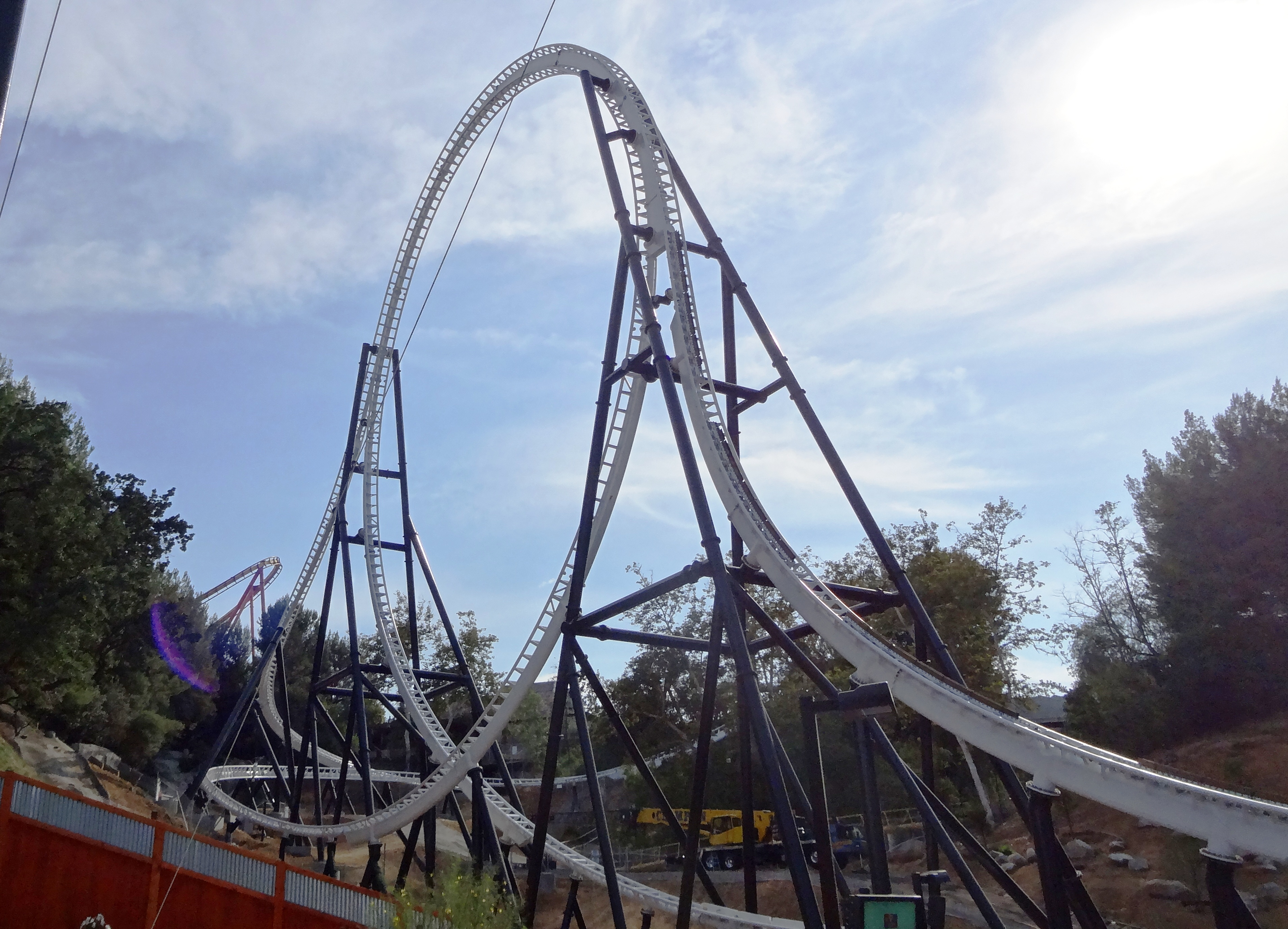
The vertical loop on Full Throttle is one of the world's tallest and largest at 160 feet (49 m)

A vertical loop is one of the earliest and most common roller coaster inversions in existence. It is a continuous, upward-sloping section of track that eventually completes a 360-degree turn, inverting riders halfway into the element. It moves them slightly left or right of the starting point. They are ellipses in the shape of an oval or teardrop. Early roller coaster designs attempted to incorporate circular vertical loops, resulting in massive g-force that had dangerous effects on riders. The modern vertical loop was first implemented on The Great American Revolution, which opened at Six Flags Magic Mountain in 1976.

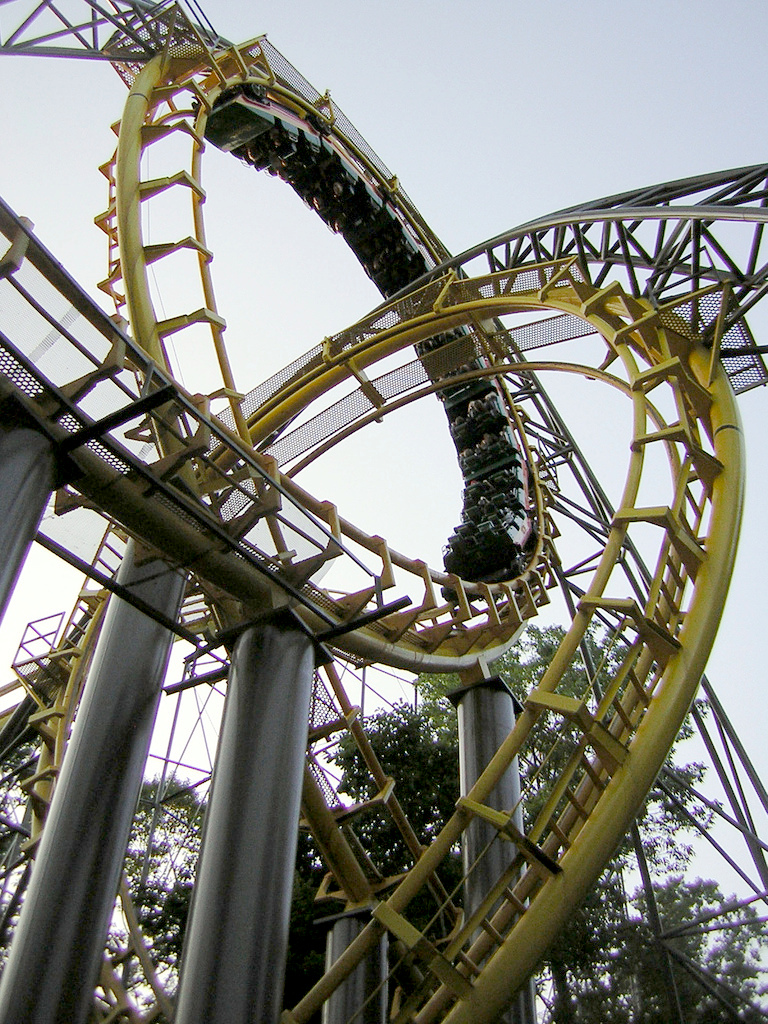
The interlocking loops on Loch Ness Monster

Arrow Dynamics designed several roller coasters with interlocking loops, including Loch Ness Monster at Busch Gardens Williamsburg and Orient Express at Worlds of Fun. This element consists of two perpendicular vertical loops that are intertwined, with one wrapping inside the other.

=== Zero-g roll ===
A zero-g roll or zero-gravity roll is a roller coaster inversion where the track twists 360 degrees as it rises and falls in elevation, usually at the crest of a hill. The element gets its name from the weightless effect of zero g-force that a rider experiences during the inversion.

=== Zero-g stall ===
A zero-g stall or zero-gravity stall is an inversion where the track twists 180 degrees during ascent, and at its crest, remains inverted for a short section of track. It then twists another 180 degrees during descent, usually in the opposite direction of the initial twist. Similar to a zero-g roll, riders experience a feeling of weightlessness during the short inverted section.

The stall element is commonly found on Rocky Mountain Construction (RMC) installations including Goliath and Wildfire. S&S has also included this element in Kennywood's Steel Curtain.

== Visual elements ==
=== Splashdown ===
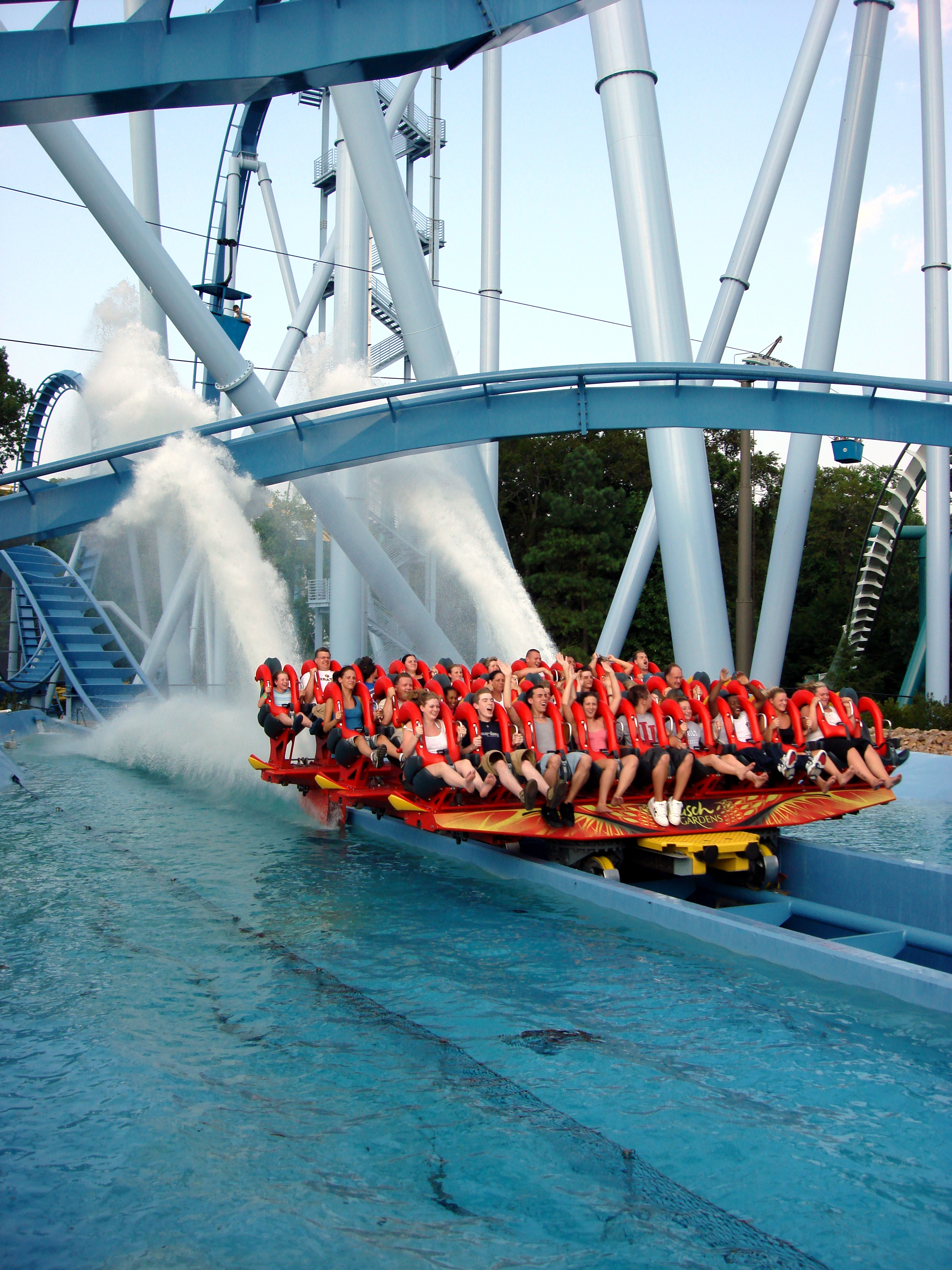
The splash down on Griffon

A splashdown is a visual element in which the ride vehicle physically interacts with a body of water, forcefully spraying or jetting water on impact. Splashdowns can be used as a natural braking system, and some coasters feature pathways for non-riding visitors to view or get wet from the splashdown element. There are two types.

- A natural splashdown is an element in which the track of the vehicle partially submerges underwater. It is featured on several roller coasters such as Matterhorn Bobsleds at Disneyland.
- A scoop splashdown is an element in which each train is equipped with two tubes – called scoops – on the rear sides of each train. The scoops are angled upward, causing water to spray as the train passes close to a body of water. A number of Bolliger & Mabillard coasters feature the element, such as Griffon at Busch Gardens Williamsburg, SheiKra at Busch Gardens Tampa, and Diamondback at Kings Island. Depending on the width of the train and the angle of the scoops, the effect can produce different results, such as two distinct streams (Griffon) or one large plume (Diamondback).

=== Water spout ===
A water spout is a visual element encompassing a number of different methods to simulate a roller coaster's interaction with a body of water – the ride vehicle does not make contact with the water. Water spouts are intended to be visually appealing. The following are some examples of roller coasters that utilize this effect.

- Atlantis Adventure at Lotte World in South Korea features a variety of water effects including water spouts that fire in synchronized fashion in more than one area of the ride.
- Hyperion at Energylandia in Poland has a water feature immediately before the final brake run.
- The Incredible Hulk Coaster at Universal's Islands of Adventure has a water spout that fires immediately following its zero-G roll as the train dives toward the water below.
- Manta at SeaWorld Orlando utilizes both water spouts and fountains that synchronize at the point the train dips toward the water, giving the illusion it is skimming the water's surface.
- Maverick at Cedar Point features several water spouts that fire upward as the train rounds a turn.

== See also ==
- Physics of roller coasters
