= Georgia Scorcher =

Stand-up roller coaster at Six Flags Over Georgia

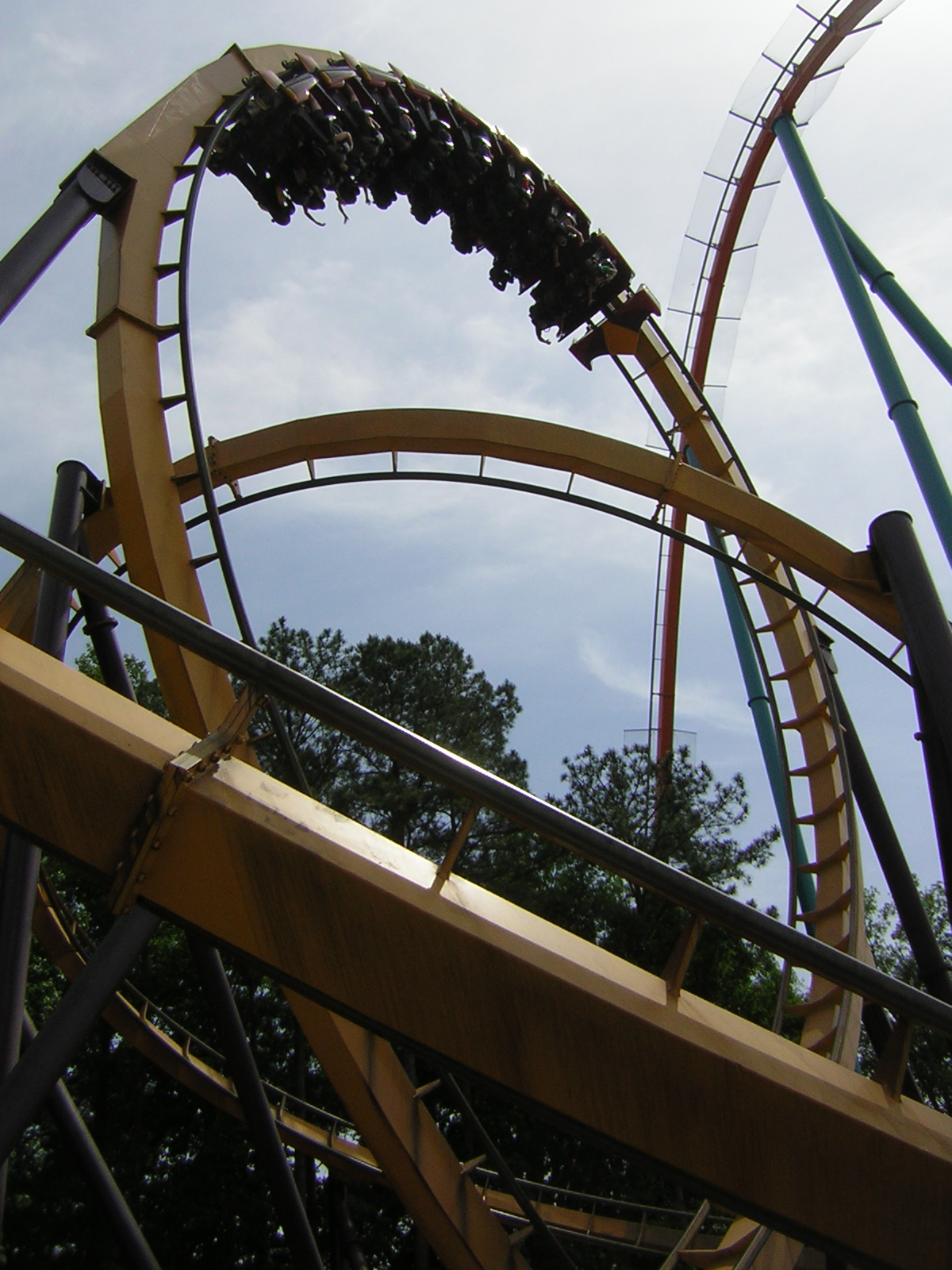
- Georgia Scorcher's vertical loop element in 2006

Six Flags Over Georgia
- Location: Six Flags Over Georgia
- Park section: Georgia
- Coordinates: 33°46′13″N 84°33′02″W
- Status: Operating
- Opening date: May 8, 1999

General statistics
- Type: Steel – Stand-up
- Manufacturer: Bolliger & Mabillard
- Designer: Werner Stengel
- Model: Stand-Up Coaster
- Lift/launch system: Chain lift hill
- Height: 107 ft (33 m)
- Drop: 101 ft (31 m)
- Length: 3,000 ft (910 m)
- Speed: 54 mph (87 km/h)
- Inversions: 2
- Duration: 1:24
- Max vertical angle: 52°
- Capacity: 1300 riders per hour
- G-force: 4
- Height restriction: 54 in (137 cm)
- Trains: 2 trains with 8 cars; riders arranged 4 across in a single row for a total of 32 riders per train
- Fast Lane available
- Georgia Scorcher at RCDB

Georgia Scorcher, or simply Scorcher, is a stand-up roller coaster located at Six Flags Over Georgia located in Austell, Georgia, United States. Manufactured by Bolliger & Mabillard, Georgia Scorcher opened on May 8, 1999, and was the last stand-up coaster installation built for almost 24 years until 2023 when SeaWorld Orlando opened Pipeline: The Surf Coaster. Georgia Scorcher is 107 feet (33 m) tall and reaches a maximum speed of 54 mph (87 km/h). The attraction was marketed with the tagline, "Put your feet to the fire."

== History ==
Georgia Scorcher is the third attraction to occupy this location in the Georgia section of the park. It replaced the Ragin' Rivers "wet-dry" raft slide tower that was added for the 1991 season, which itself replaced one of the two Log Jamboree log flumes.

Unlike Mantis, Chang and The Riddler's Revenge, which opened at Cedar Point in 1996, Six Flags Kentucky Kingdom in 1997 and Six Flags Magic Mountain in 1998 respectively, Georgia Scorcher did not continue the trend of the world's tallest and fastest stand-up roller coasters. Compared to them, its layout is more modest, due to the long, narrow site selected for it.

On November 10, 1998, Six Flags Over Georgia announced that they would be building a new stand-up roller coaster. It would be named Georgia Scorcher and was scheduled to open for 1999 season.

Georgia Scorcher would open to guests in May 1999.

The track was originally painted yellow with purple supports. For the 2019 season, the track was repainted cherry red with dark grey supports.

== Track layout ==
Georgia Scorcher departs the station and climbs its 107-foot (33 m) lift hill, then drops down a 101 ft drop. Then the roller coaster enters its 81-foot (25 m) vertical loop. It then climbs to the right, circling back towards the station before diving sharply down to the left, entering a non-inverting inclined loop that threads through the center of the vertical loop. After exiting the element, the roller coaster then climbs a small hill and is twisted over on its right side, twisting back as it enters its second inversion, a corkscrew. The roller coaster then climbs up to the left, crossing over the start of the lift hill, before diving down and performing a ground-level 270-degree helix turn, crossing itself again as it rises one final time to enter the brake run, returning to the station via a U-turn to the left.
