= Patriot (California's Great America) =

Floorless roller coaster

- Previously known as Vortex (1991–2016)

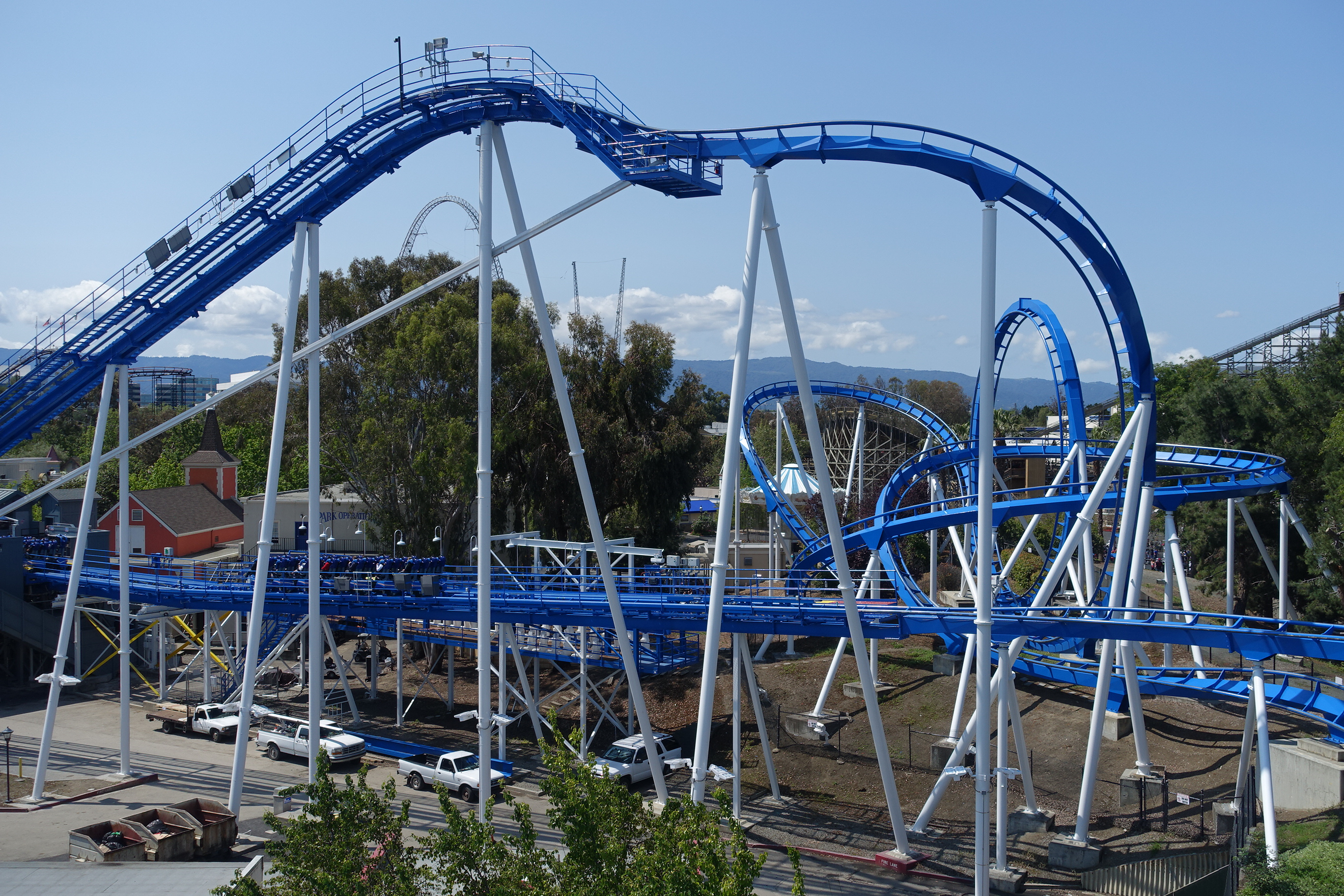

California's Great America
- Location: California's Great America
- Park section: Hometown Square
- Coordinates: 37°23′48.11″N 121°58′23.61″W
- Status: Operating
- Opening date: March 9, 1991

General statistics
- Type: Steel – Floorless Coaster
- Manufacturer: Bolliger & Mabillard
- Designer: Werner Stengel
- Model: Floorless Coaster
- Lift/launch system: Chain lift hill
- Height: 91 ft (28 m)
- Length: 1,920 ft (590 m)
- Speed: 45 mph (72 km/h)
- Inversions: 2
- Duration: 2:14
- Capacity: 1200 riders per hour
- Height restriction: 54–78 in (137–198 cm)
- Trains: 2 trains with 7 cars; riders arranged 4 across in a single row for a total of 28 riders per train
- Fast Lane available
- Patriot at RCDB

Patriot is a floorless roller coaster located in Hometown Square at the California's Great America amusement park in Santa Clara, California, United States. The roller coaster originally opened as Vortex on March 9, 1991. It was a stand-up roller coaster designed by Werner Stengel and manufactured by Bolliger & Mabillard.

Vortex last operated as a stand-up coaster on September 5, 2016, and it reopened as Patriot on April 1, 2017. The ride was converted to a sit-down configuration featuring new floorless trains and a new color scheme. On November 6, 2026, Six Flags announced that California’s Great America would be permanently closing on September 6, 2027.

== History ==
=== Vortex (1991–2016) ===
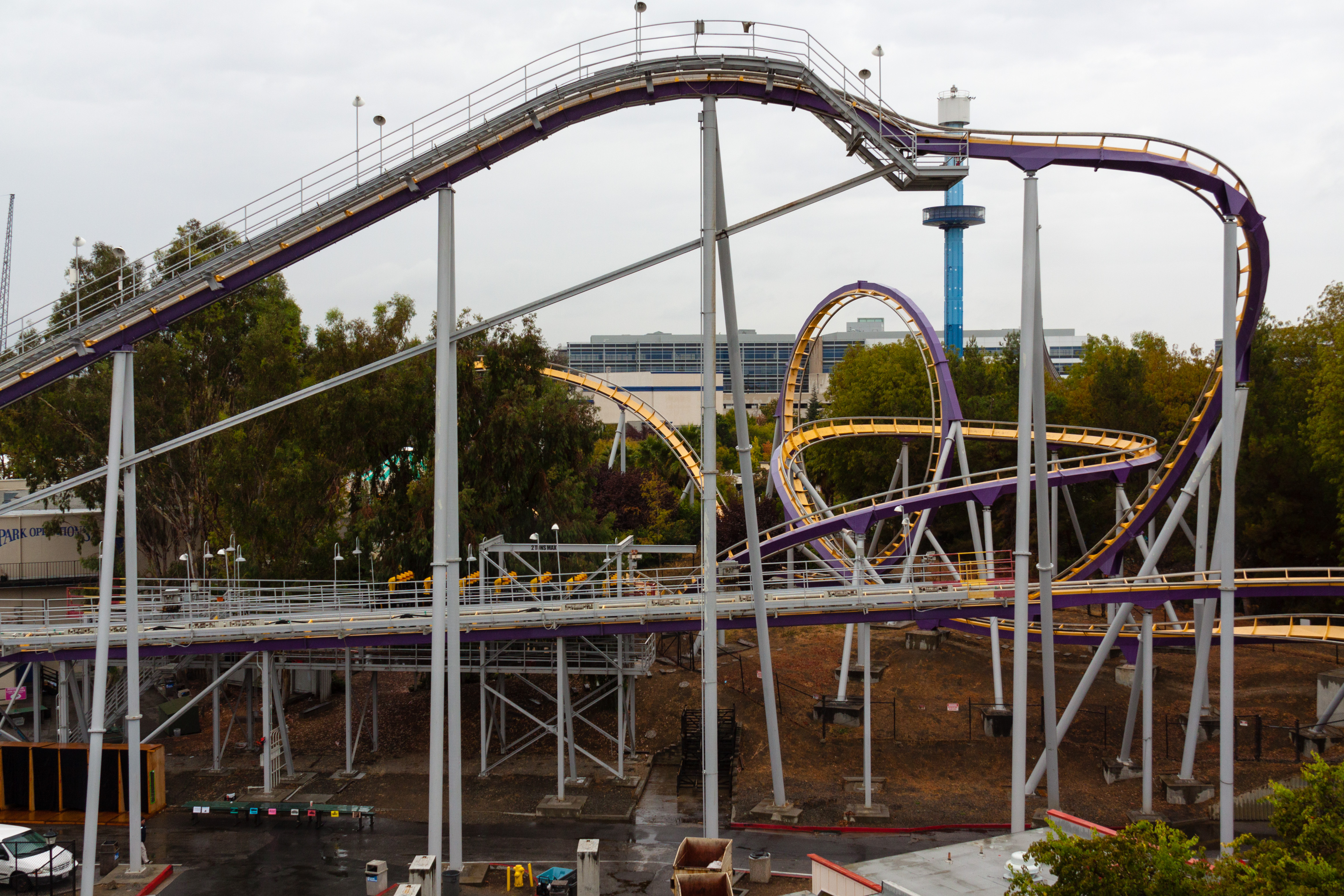
When the ride was known as Vortex (1991–2016)

Vortex was a stand-up roller coaster that officially opened at California's Great America on March 9, 1991. It was the second coaster from the manufacturer Bolliger & Mabillard following Iron Wolf, which was installed a year earlier at sister park Six Flags Great America. It shares a similar design with Vortex at sister park Carowinds but features a different layout. It featured purple track with yellow rails and gray supports. The ride became rough over the years, and its last day of operation was on September 5, 2016.

=== Patriot (2017–present) ===
On August 18, 2016, the park announced Vortex would be converted to Patriot for the 2017 season, including new Bolliger & Mabillard floorless trains and a new color scheme consisting of (repainted) blue track and white supports. Although this is the first floorless coaster in the park’s 41-year history it is the second floorless conversion in the Cedar Fair (now Six Flags) chain, following Mantis turning into Rougarou at Cedar Point back in 2015.

Patriot will be an outstanding addition to our family of roller coasters and we’re honored to provide active and past military service members free admission through Memorial Day (March 25 - May 29, 2017) weekend.

— California’s Great America Vice President and General Manager Raul Rehnborg

The transformation began in September 2016 shortly after Vortex closed. The park opened on Saturday, March 25 for the 2017 season, with Patriot opening to the public the following Saturday on April 1. In celebration of the opening (and name) of the coaster, the park offered free entry to all current and past military service members through Memorial Day (May 29, 2017) weekend with up to 6 of their guests being offered discount tickets. Season pass holder previews were announced to start on March 31, 2017, a day before the official opening of the ride.

When looking at the logo of the ride, it closely resembles the other one of its namesake, Patriot, which is located at the Worlds of Fun amusement park in Kansas City, Missouri, which also forms part of the Six Flags chain of amusement parks.

== Ride experience ==
=== Track elements ===
- Loop
- Corkscrew

The coaster takes riders to a 91-foot height after which it makes an initial left hand drop into its first loop. It then executes a left turnaround to travel into another left turnaround through its loop. The train then travels to the other end of its layout into the corkscrew element and another left turnaround after which it enters into the final brake run.

The course used to cross over the park train's railroad tracks by the corkscrew. The coaster's lift hill stands parallel to the footers of the former Tidal Wave looping shuttle coaster.
