= Banshee (roller coaster) =

Ride at Kings Island in Mason, Ohio, US

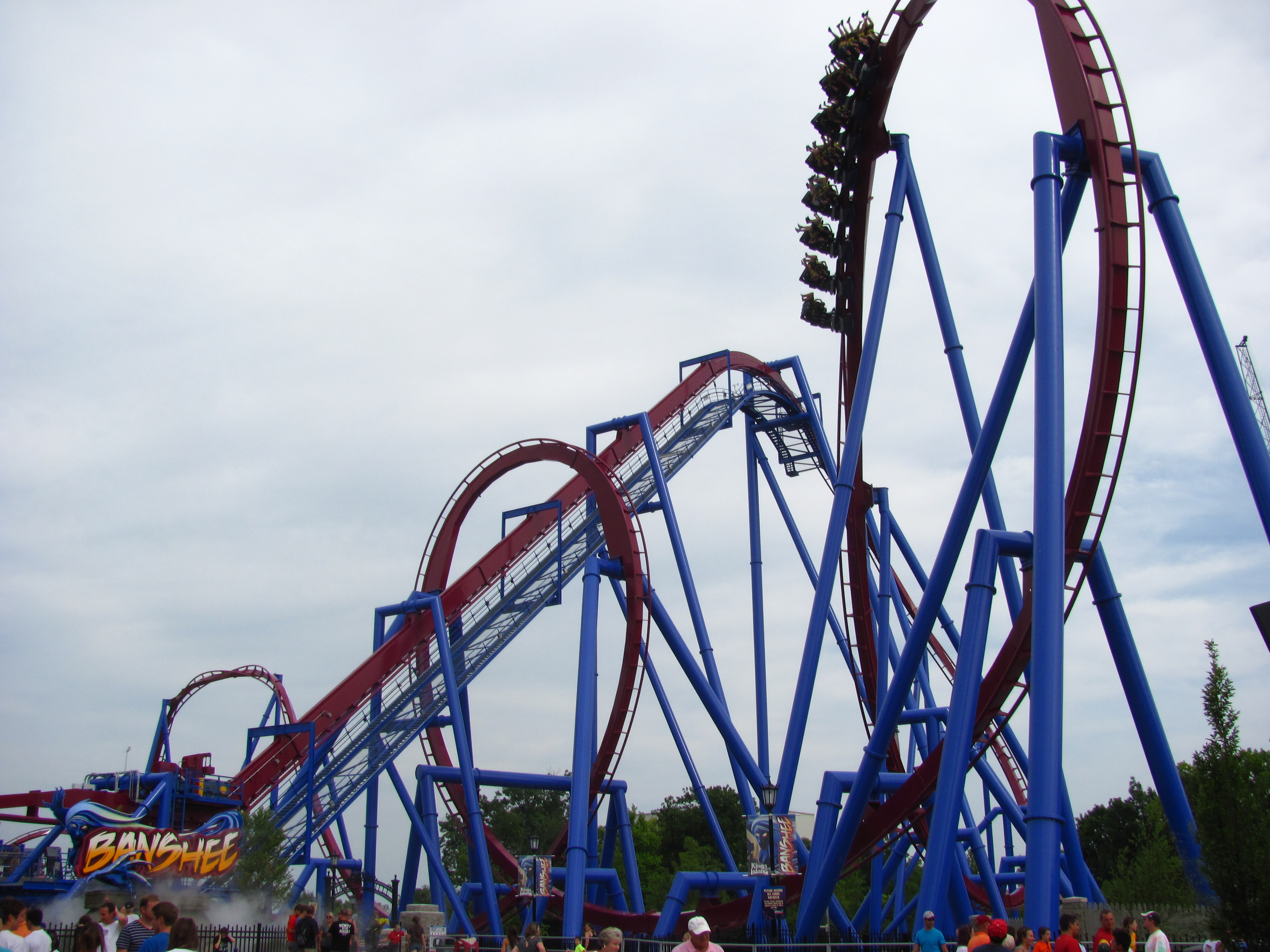
- Banshee's Logo (Top) Banshee's Lift Hill, First Drop, Dive Loop, First Vertical Loop, and Zero-G Roll (Bottom)

Kings Island
- Location: Kings Island
- Park section: Action Zone
- Coordinates: 39°20′44.39″N 84°15′55.70″W
- Status: Operating
- Opening date: April 18, 2014
- Cost: $24 million
- Replaced: Son of Beast; Thunder Alley

General statistics
- Type: Steel – Inverted
- Manufacturer: Bolliger & Mabillard
- Model: Inverted Coaster
- Track layout: Terrain
- Lift/launch system: Chain lift hill
- Height: 167 ft (51 m)
- Drop: 150 ft (46 m)
- Length: 4,124 ft (1,257 m)
- Speed: 68 mph (109 km/h)
- Inversions: 7
- Duration: 2:40
- Capacity: 1,650 riders per hour
- Height restriction: 52–78 in (132–198 cm)
- Trains: 3 trains with 8 cars; riders arranged 4 across in a single row for a total of 32 riders per train
- Fast Lane available
- Banshee at RCDB

Banshee is an inverted roller coaster located at Kings Island amusement park in Mason, Ohio, United States. Designed and manufactured by Swiss company Bolliger & Mabillard, the ride opened to the public on April 18, 2014, and is the longest inverted coaster in the world, featuring a track length of 4,124 feet (1,257 m). Banshee was also the most expensive project in Kings Island's history at the time, costing the park $24 million to construct. The ride includes seven inversions and travels up to a maximum speed of 68 mph (109 km/h). It operates with three trains, each with eight cars, producing an hourly capacity of 1,650 riders.

Banshee was built at the former location of a short-lived, record-breaking wooden coaster, Son of Beast, as well as the Thunder Alley go-kart attraction. The ride was officially announced on August 8, 2013, although its name "Banshee" had been trademarked earlier in April 2013. Construction took place from August 2013 through January 2014. When Banshee opened, it was well-received, accommodating over one million riders in less than three months. It has also consistently ranked among the top 50 steel roller coasters worldwide in the annual Golden Ticket Awards publication from Amusement Today.

== History ==
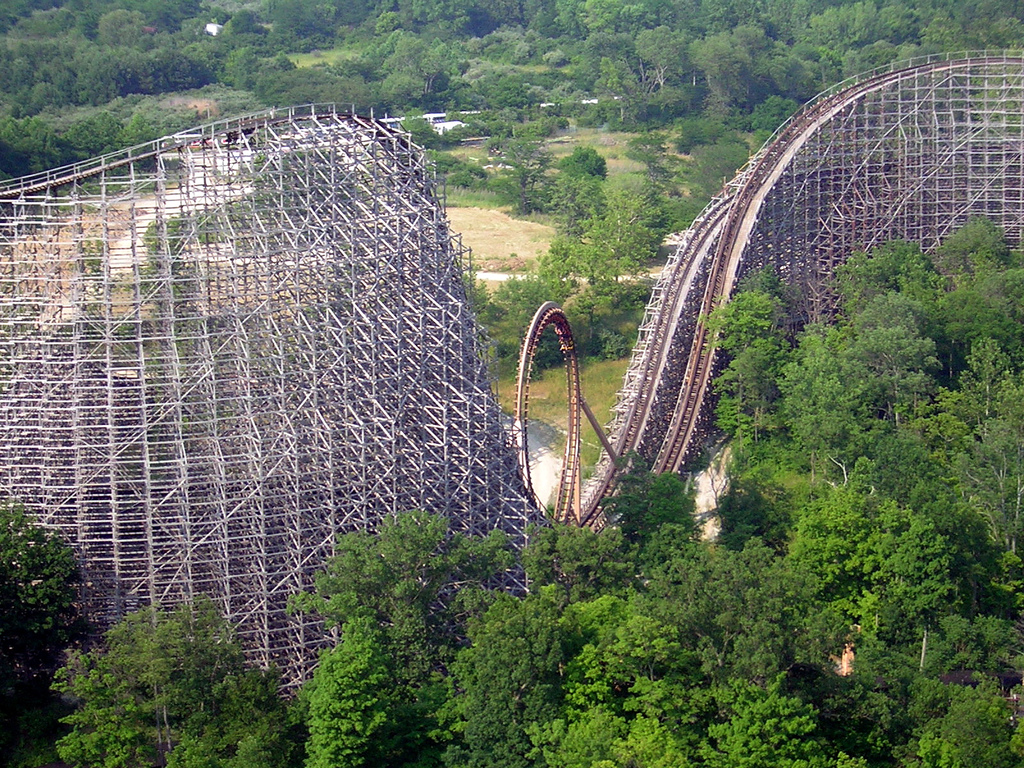
Banshee replaced Son of Beast (pictured), which closed in 2009 before being demolished three years later

Banshee was built at the former location of Son of Beast, a wooden roller coaster plagued with issues and demolished in 2012, and the Thunder Alley go-kart attraction that was removed the same year. A memorial for Son of Beast is located in Banshee's queue line. Following their removal, it was not immediately clear what would replace the attractions.

=== Construction ===
Construction on a new attraction began on April 22, 2013, and a trademark for the name "Banshee" was filed the next day. Owner Cedar Fair had previously considered using the name for a stand-up roller coaster at Cedar Point, though Cedar Point's coaster was ultimately named Mantis. Kings Island began teasing the new attraction on the first day of the 2013 season. Along the perimeter of the former Thunder Alley go-kart track, a fence was set up with a sign that read, "Due to the increasing occurrence of mysterious and bone-chilling screams, it has become necessary to close this section of the park until the cause of this evil phenomenon can be identified." During the course of the summer, several clues about the attraction were set up around the construction site. On June 10, 2013, the park launched their social media campaign by posting a photo showing the construction site with the caption, "Field of Dreams". The campaign continued with five scarecrows around the construction site and several Twitter posts about the future attraction. Then, at the beginning of July 2013, recordings of someone screaming could be heard by park guests near the construction area. Two weeks later, farm owls were placed in nearby trees.

On July 31, 2013, Kings Island detailed plans to reveal a new world record-breaking attraction at 10 p.m. on August 8. Media packages containing a silver comb, artificial hair, and a tag were sent out to media outlets to notify them of the upcoming announcement. A limited number of tickets were also made available to the public giving access to a tour of the construction site prior to the revealing and reserved seats at the event, with net proceeds being donated to breast cancer research. Blueprints for the project were leaked to the public on August 1, 2013. One week later, on August 8, Kings Island officially announced that it was constructing Banshee, the world's longest inverted roller coaster. Banshee would feature seven inversions, including a pretzel knot inversion and a vertical loop around the lift hill. Banshee would be the second coaster constructed at Kings Island by Swiss company Bolliger & Mabillard (after Diamondback, which opened in 2009), as well as the park's 14th operating roller coaster.

The foundation work for the supports was done by R.E. Middleton, and the rest of the ride's construction was performed by Adena Corporation. The first pieces of track and supports were delivered to the park from Clermont Steel Fabricators on August 16, 2013; the first track piece was erected on August 27, 2013. The lift hill was completed on September 29, 2013, and by the end of October, other elements such as the first drop, dive loop, and vertical loop were installed. Work on the station commenced that November, and the ride was 40 percent complete by the next month. The final piece of track was installed on January 23, 2014. Workers began installing the ride's trains that February, and testing began on March 15.

=== Operation ===
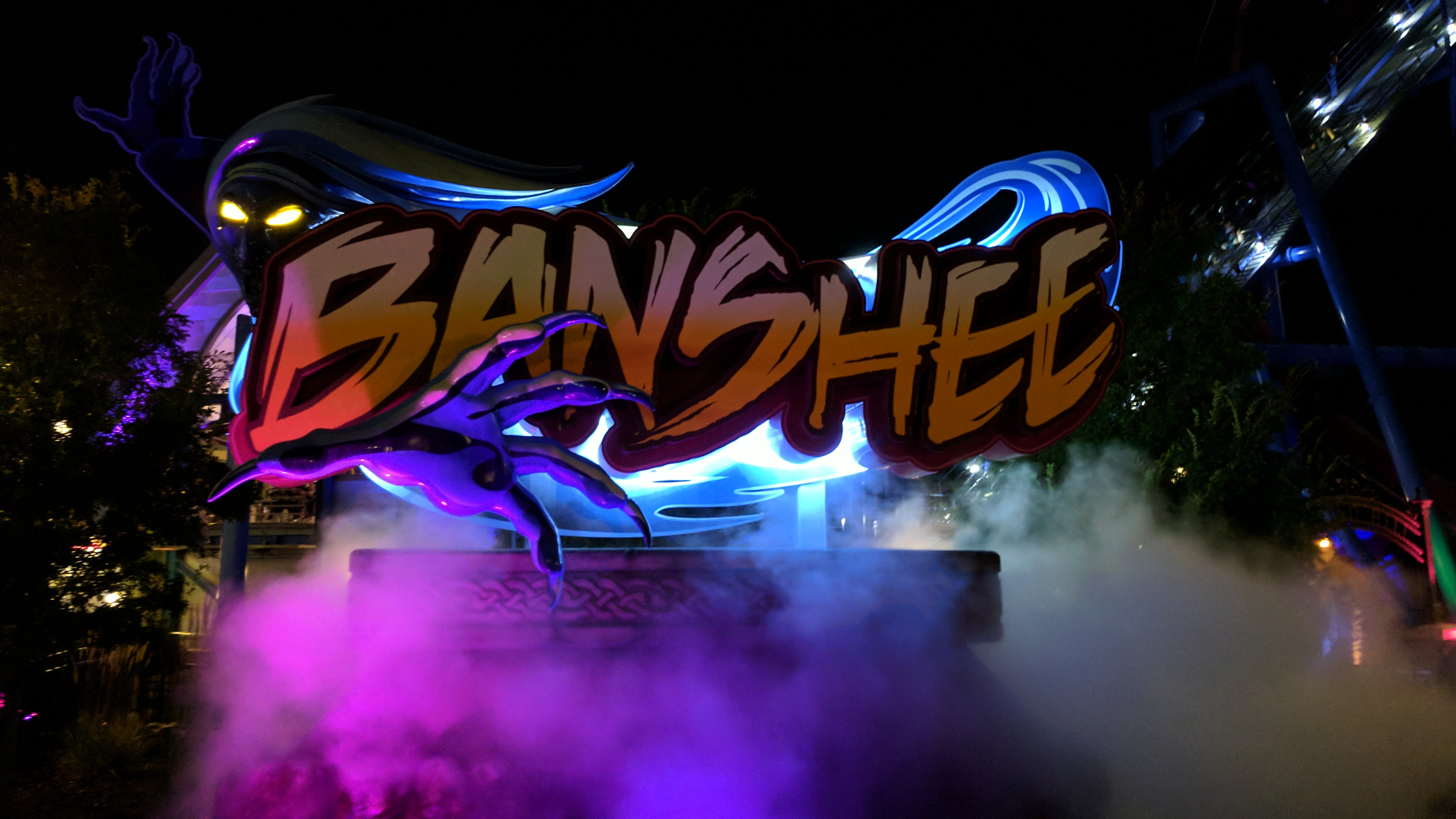
Banshee's entrance sign at night (2017)

Kings Island hosted a preview event for Banshee on April 17, 2014. Several hundred journalists and members of the public, coming from 28 U.S. states as well as Canada and the UK, gathered at the park at as early as 4:00 a.m. The ride officially opened to the public the next day, April 18, 2014. At a cost of $24 million, the ride was the single biggest investment in Kings Island's history at the time. Banshee's opening coincided with increased ticket sales at Kings Island, which opened for the season on the same day. Kings Island officials reported that more people visited the park during the weekend of April 18–20, 2014, than on any other opening weekend in the park's 43-year history.

Banshee had attracted one million riders by July 10, 2014, less than three months after its opening. On that day, Kings Island gave the ride's millionth guest a gift package and a commemorative sign. At the time, Banshee was projected to be Kings Island's most popular new ride in 25 years; by comparison, Vortex had given 2,183,642 rides the year after it opened in 1987. The ride recorded its two-millionth rider on November 2, 2014.

== Characteristics ==
Banshee stands 167 feet (51 m) tall and features a first drop of 150 feet (46 m). With a length of 4,124 feet (1,257 m), the ride became the longest inverted roller coaster in the world when it opened in 2014. The ride includes seven inversions: two vertical loops, a dive loop, a zero-g roll, a pretzel knot, and an inline twist. It is also tied with Montu at Busch Gardens Tampa for achieving the most inversions on any inverted coaster. The first vertical loop wraps around the lift hill, an element that can be found on two other Bolliger & Mabillard roller coasters, The Riddler's Revenge at Six Flags Magic Mountain and Kumba at Busch Gardens Tampa. Riders experience speeds of up to 68 miles per hour (109 km/h) on the ride, which lasts two minutes and forty seconds. Due to the terrain underneath Banshee, the highest point of the lift hill is 208 feet (63 m) above the lowest point of the ride, which is at the bottom of the pretzel knot. As a result, Banshee reaches its maximum speed approximately halfway through the layout, rather than after the first drop, as is the case with most roller coasters.

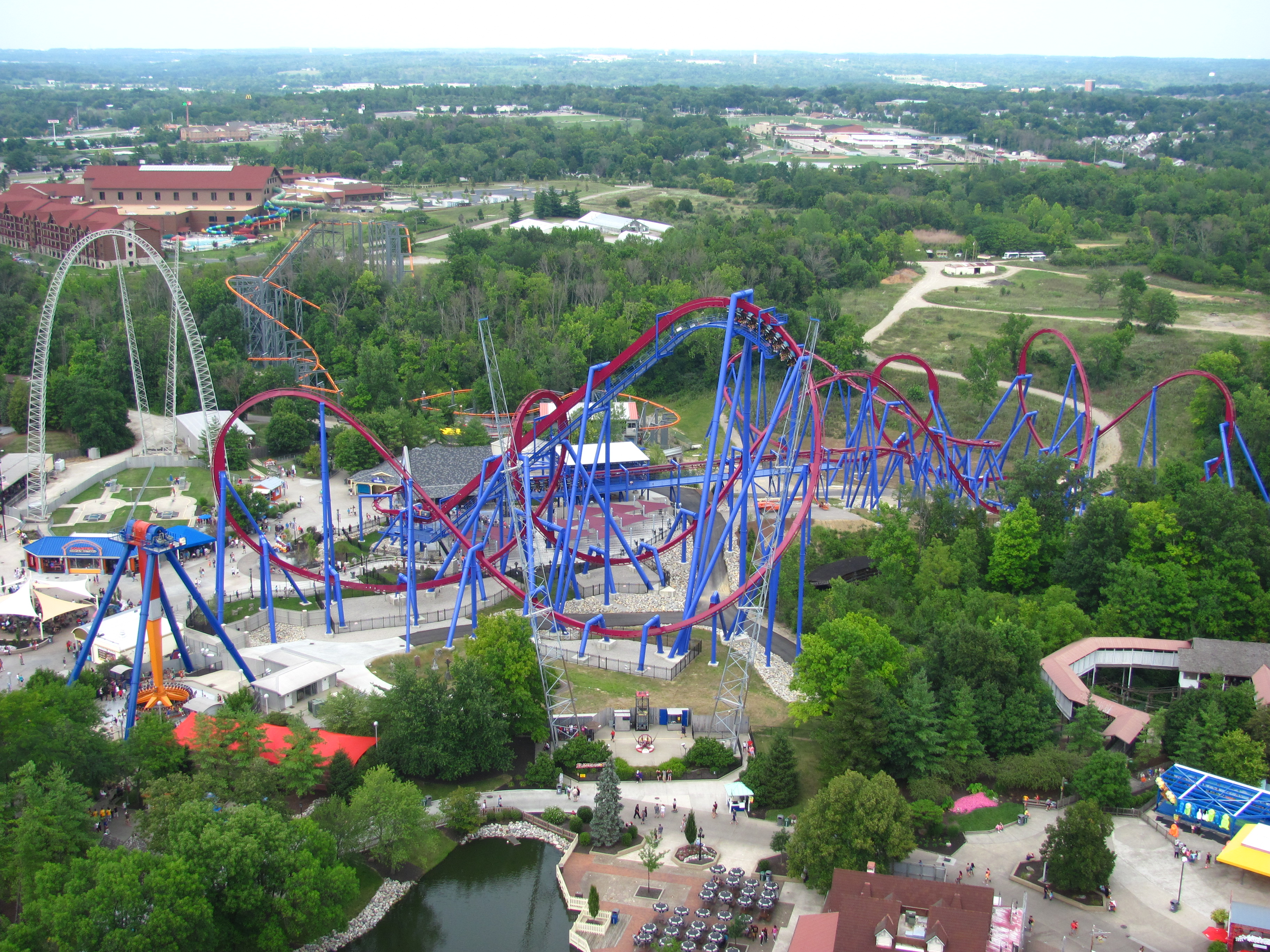
A view of Banshee from the Eiffel Tower

Banshee operates with three trains made of steel and fiberglass with eight cars per train. In each car, riders are seated four across in a single row for a total of 32 riders per train. The configuration has a theoretical capacity of 1,650 riders per hour. Riders are secured by flexible, over-the-shoulder restraints and interlocking seat belts, known as vest restraints, similar to those used on Bolliger & Mabillard's Wing Coaster models. Each train is painted a different color: blue, green, or purple.

Banshee's tubular steel track was manufactured by Clermont Steel Fabricators in Batavia, Ohio. At night, the ride is illuminated and features fog effects.

As the name suggests, the ride is themed after the mythological female spirit of the same name. The ride's backstory details sightings and screams of the banshee dating back to when the construction of Kings Island began in 1970. The ride features its own plaza area, with its station being themed appropriately.

== Ride experience ==
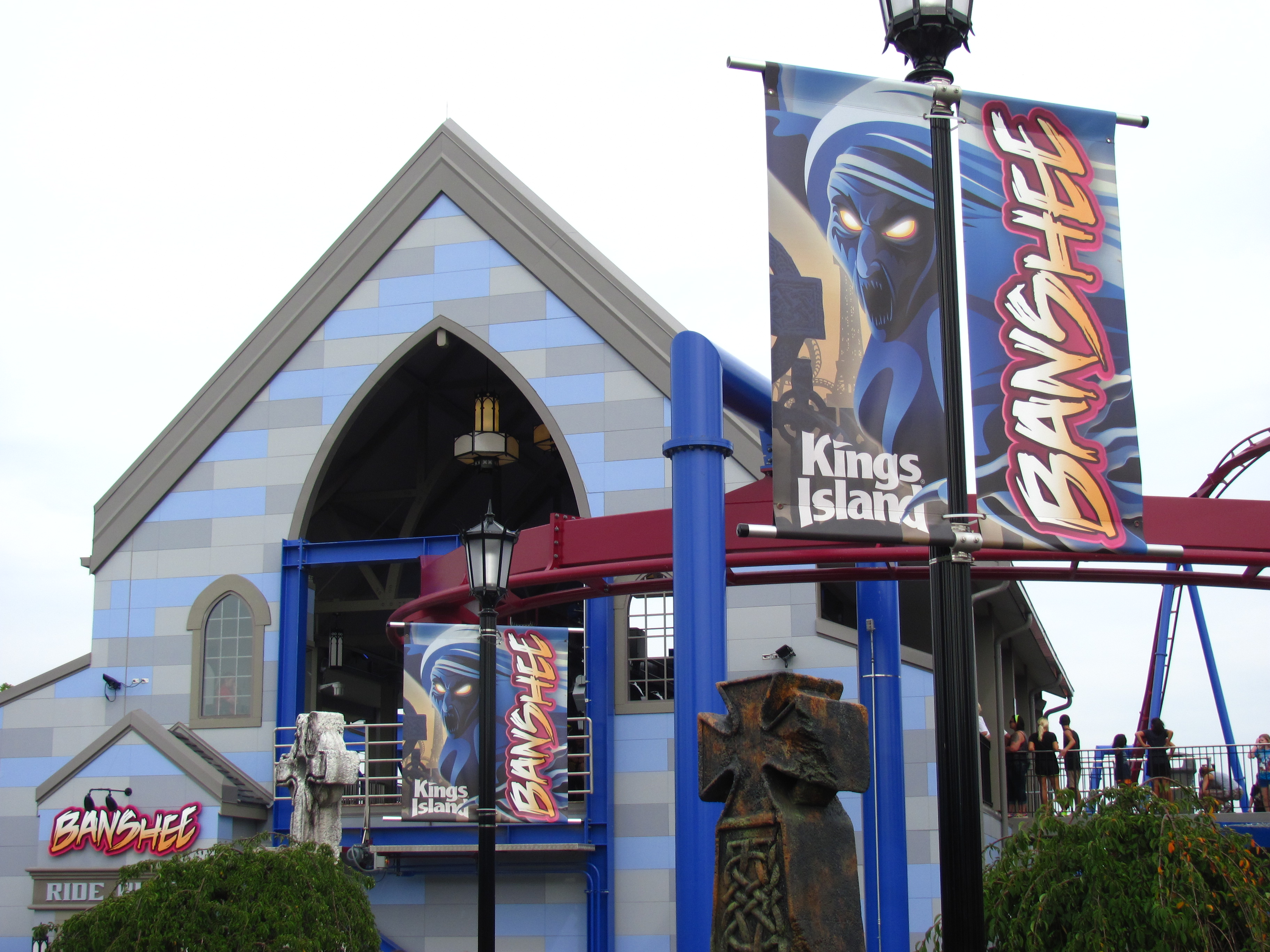
The station of Banshee

After departing from the station, the train makes a left turn towards the 167-foot (51 m) chain lift hill. After reaching the top, the sound of a banshee screaming is played as the train drops into a heavily banked right turn. After reaching the bottom of the drop, riders enter a dive loop immediately followed by a vertical loop around the lift hill. Continuing down the valley, the train enters the third inversion, a zero-gravity roll, where riders experience the feeling of weightlessness. Next, the train makes an upward left-hand turn into a "pretzel knot" (an element where the train enters a dive loop, followed by an Immelmann loop). Upon exiting the pretzel knot, the train enters a second vertical loop before making a right turn into an inline twist. Following a downward left hand helix, the train makes a final banked right turn into the final brake run leading back to the station.

== Incidents ==
On June 19, 2024, a 38-year-old man, Arntanaro Nelso, from Wilmington, Ohio, was critically injured after he entered a restricted area and was struck by a moving train. He was rushed to a nearby hospital, where he died two days later on June 21.

== Reception ==
Following the announcement of Banshee, Screamscape amusement park enthusiast Lance Hart called the new roller coaster "The perfect addition to an already great coaster line-up" at Kings Island. Brian Krosnick from Theme Park Tourist said that though he was excited for Banshee, he questioned why the park did not choose to add additional theming throughout the layout of the ride. In a poll conducted by CoasterRadio.com, respondents ranked Banshee as the best new roller coaster for 2014. The same year, Banshee received a Golden Ticket Award for Best New Ride from Amusement Today magazine, as well as a Golden Ticket Award for being the 16th best steel roller coaster worldwide.

Golden Ticket Awards: Best New Ride for 2014
Ranking	2

Golden Ticket Awards: Top steel Roller Coasters
Year									1998	1999
Ranking									–	–
Year	2000	2001	2002	2003	2004	2005	2006	2007	2008	2009
Ranking	–	–	–	–	–	–	–	–	–	–
Year	2010	2011	2012	2013	2014	2015	2016	2017	2018	2019
Ranking	–	–	–	–	16	20	13	22	29	33
Year	2020	2021	2022	2023	2024	2025	2026			
Ranking	N/A	37	37	41 (tie)	38	46 (tie)	–			

Preceded by Pyrenees	World's longest inverted roller coaster April 2014–present	Current holder
