= Pipeline: The Surf Coaster =

Roller coaster at SeaWorld Orlando

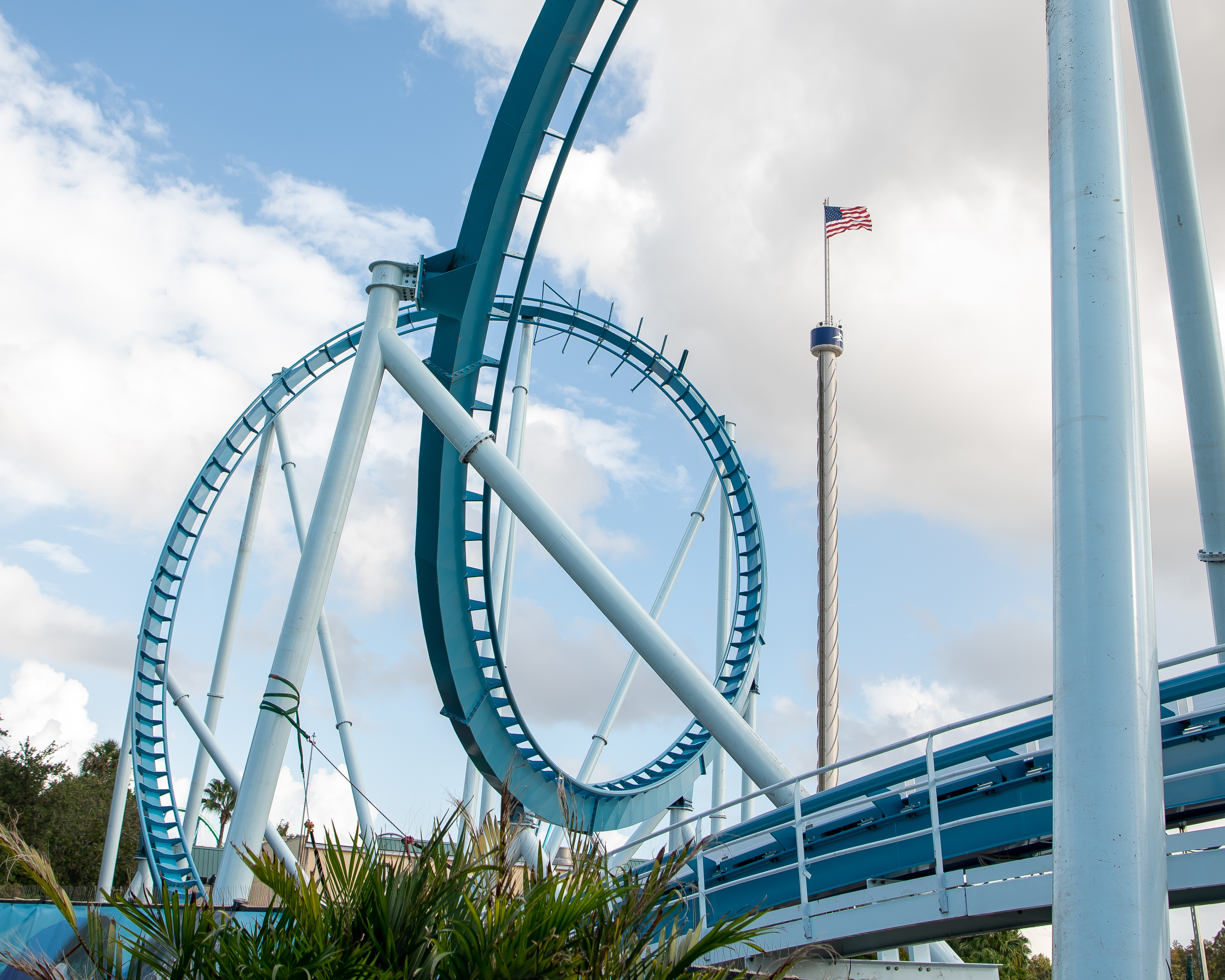
- Pipeline's overbanked turn

SeaWorld Orlando
- Location: SeaWorld Orlando
- Park section: Sea of Power/Port of Entry
- Coordinates: 28.4109°N 81.4639°W
- Status: Operating
- Soft opening date: May 12, 2023
- Opening date: May 27, 2023

General statistics
- Type: Steel – Launched – Stand-up
- Manufacturer: Bolliger & Mabillard
- Model: Surf Coaster
- Lift/launch system: LSM launch
- Height: 110 ft (34 m)
- Length: 2,950 ft (900 m)
- Speed: 60 mph (97 km/h)
- Inversions: 1
- Duration: 1:50
- Height restriction: 54–78 in (137–198 cm)
- Trains: 2 trains with 6 cars. Riders are arranged 2 across in 2 rows for a total of 24 riders per train.
- Theme: Surfing
- Website: Official website
- Quick Queue available
- Pipeline: The Surf Coaster at RCDB

Pipeline: The Surf Coaster, or simply Pipeline, is a steel launched stand-up roller coaster at SeaWorld Orlando in Orlando, Florida. Manufactured by Bolliger & Mabillard (B&M), the roller coaster opened on May 27, 2023. Pipeline is a Surf Coaster model and is themed to surfing, featuring surfboard-shaped trains. Pipeline is the first stand up roller coaster built since Georgia Scorcher debuted at Six Flags Over Georgia in 1999.

The roller coaster is a prototype, where the seats of riders shift up and down along the course of the ride. It reaches a height of 110 feet (34 m) and maximum speeds of 60 mph (97 km/h), and features a track length of 2,950 feet (900 m). The ride is located in the Sea of Power and Port of Entry sections of the park.

== History ==
The roller coaster manufacturer Bolliger & Mabillard filed a patent trademark for "Surf Coaster" on May 28, 2019. A project at SeaWorld Orlando codenamed "Project Penguin" was revealed in January 2020 after site-work plans were filed with Orange County officials for a new attraction in 2021. The new project was planned to be built toward the front of the park near a pathway that runs along Bayside Stadium. The area had been used in the past for festivals in the park. Subsequent plans were announced in June and September 2020, which also confirmed the new project to be a "custom launch coaster" featuring a stand-up restraint design. Early reports speculated that the Surf Coaster model would be built at SeaWorld Orlando.

Teasers for SeaWorld Orlando's new roller coaster began in April 2022. A picture of trees with roller coaster track in the background was depicted in the first teaser. Construction fencing began appearing along the surrounding area. In June 2022, the park teased the warning "High surf advisory". The teaser warning would later be used as a hashtag to promote the roller coaster on social media. Due to the fallout from Hurricane Ian in September 2022, the official unveiling of the new coaster was delayed.

The final teaser video was released in early October 2022. In the video, the attraction's construction progress was on display. On October 18, 2022, the park officially unveiled Pipeline: The Surf Coaster in an announcement. The scheduled opening was stated to be spring of 2023. It was marketed as the first Surf Coaster in the world. Track construction went vertical in late October 2022. Pipeline's trains were put on display at the International Association of Amusement Parks and Attractions (IAAPA) Expo on November 15, 2022.

Construction of the track was completed a month later on December 19, 2022, and testing began in March 2023. The official opening date was announced to be May 27, 2023, with a soft opening preview period for passholders starting on May 12, 2023.

== Ride experience ==
After exiting the station, the surfboard-themed train launches 60 miles per hour (97 km/h) into a 110 feet (34 m) overbanked turn to the right. Following the overbanked turn, the train turns left into an inversion billed as a "wave curl", before the train goes up and turns right into one of two helix elements. After traversing the 360° helix, the train immediately turns into a second overbanked turn. Traveling into a banked airtime hill, the train turns right and then whips to the left into a second 270° helix. Upon exiting the helix, the train turns left before making a final right turn into the brake run. A ride cycle is approximately one minute and 50 seconds.

== Characteristics ==
Pipeline: The Surf Coaster is a Surf Coaster model manufactured by Bolliger and Mabillard. It was described by American Coaster Enthusiasts (ACE) as a "new breed of standup coaster", which was a form of coaster that had been dormant since Georgia Scorcher opened in 1999. ACE also noted that it was the first launched coaster from B&M to feature more than one rider per row. At the IAAPA Expo on November 15, 2022, SeaWorld Orlando executive Jonathan Smith mentioned that that the restraints on Surf Coasters have movement, which differ from older stand-up coasters, where riders stand "erect" and do not move.

=== Track ===
The steel box track for Pipeline: The Surf Coaster is approximately 2,950 feet (900 m) long. and the height of the highest peak (the first overbanked turn) is 110 feet (34 m). The color of the track is teal and the supports are white.

=== Theme ===
Pipeline: The Surf Coaster is themed to surfing, especially surfing cultures in California and Australia. The park bills the launch section of the roller coaster as a "surfing launch" featuring "wave jumping motions", which shift rider's seats up and down to resemble the feeling of surfing. Additionally, the roller coaster's trains are designed to mimic surfboards. The roller coaster's only inversion is nicknamed the "wave curl" inversion, inspired by the "cork alley oop" surfing maneuver.

== See also ==
- Stand-up roller coaster
