= Goliath (Six Flags Great America) =

Wooden roller coaster

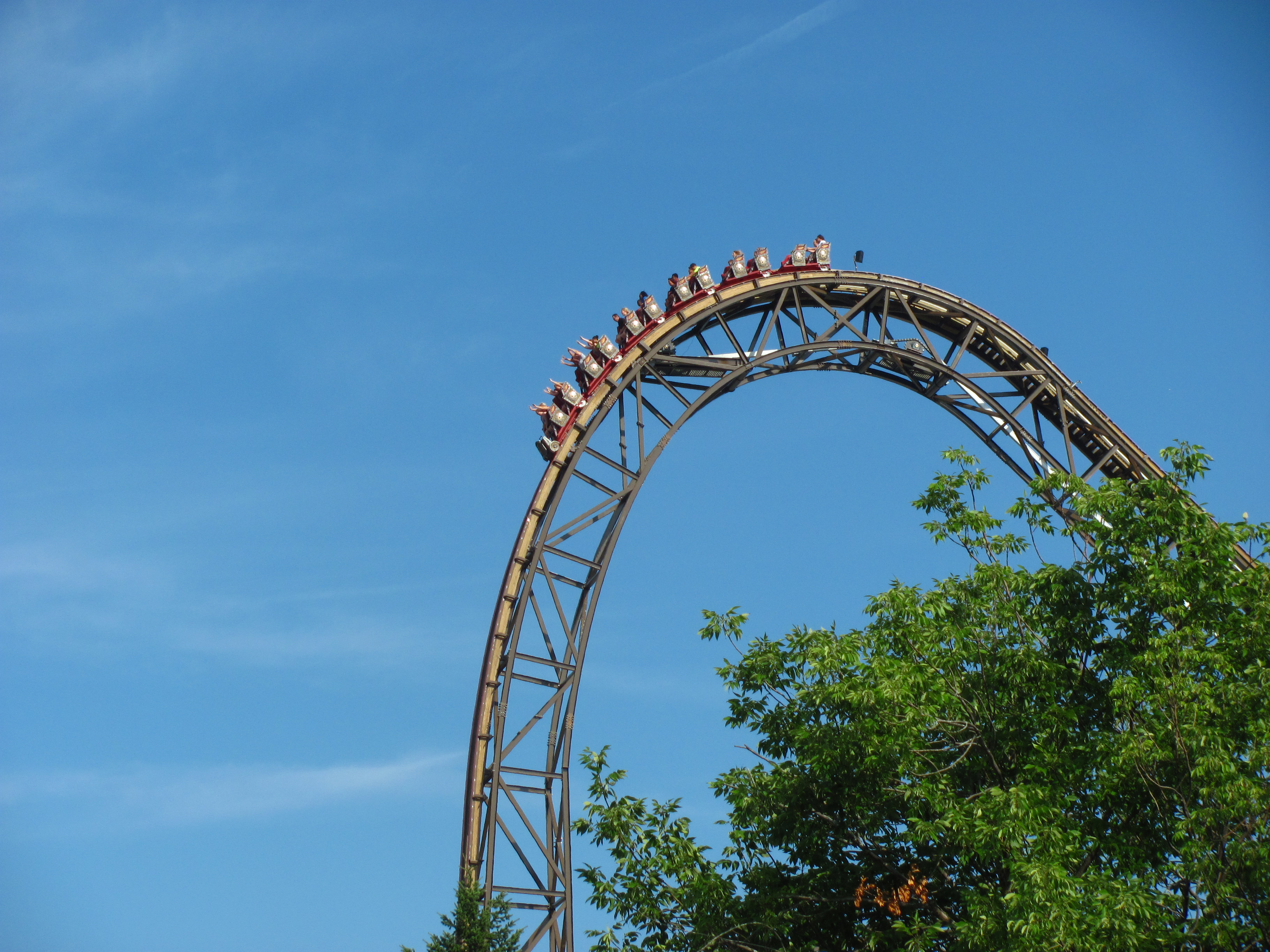
- Goliath's 180 feet (55 m) drop

Six Flags Great America
- Location: Six Flags Great America
- Park section: County Fair
- Coordinates: 42.366111°N 87.931111°W
- Status: Operating
- Soft opening date: June 18, 2014
- Opening date: June 19, 2014
- Replaced: Iron Wolf

General statistics
- Manufacturer: Rocky Mountain Construction
- Designer: Alan Schilke
- Model: Topper Track – Custom
- Lift/launch system: Chain lift hill
- Height: 165 ft (50 m)
- Drop: 180 ft (55 m)
- Length: 3,100 ft (940 m)
- Speed: 72 mph (116 km/h)
- Inversions: 2
- Duration: 1:45
- Max vertical angle: 85°
- Capacity: 800 riders per hour
- Height restriction: 48 in (122 cm)
- Trains: 2 trains with 6 cars; riders arranged 2 across in 2 rows for a total of 24 riders per train
- Fast Lane available
- Must transfer from wheelchair
- Goliath at RCDB

Goliath is a wooden roller coaster located at Six Flags Great America in Gurnee, Illinois. Manufactured by Rocky Mountain Construction (RMC) and designed by Alan Schilke, the roller coaster features RMC's Topper Track design and opened to the public on June 19, 2014. Goliath initially set three world records among wooden coasters, having the longest drop at 180 feet (55 m), the steepest angle of 85 degrees, and the fastest speed of 72 mph (116 km/h). It still holds all 3 records for the longest drop, steepest angle, and fastest wooden roller coaster in the world. In addition, the ride also features two inversions and a maximum descent that reaches 15 feet (4.6 m) below ground level.

Goliath was constructed over a nine-month period on the site previously occupied by Iron Wolf, a steel roller coaster removed in 2011 and relocated to Six Flags America. Goliath's opening allowed Great America to claim the title of having the most wooden track in one park, a recognition that was later claimed by Kings Island. Following its record-breaking debut, the coaster was well-received by the media and enthusiasts, and it has consistently ranked in the top 25 among wooden coasters in the annual Golden Ticket Awards publication from Amusement Today.

== History ==
On August 5, 2011, Six Flags Great America announced on its official Facebook page that the Iron Wolf would be closing permanently on September 5, 2011. The ride was subsequently removed and relocated to Six Flags America, where it reopened as Apocalypse: The Last Stand. For a brief period, Great America did not release any definitive plans for the site's replacement.

In early August 2013, Six Flags Great America released a teaser campaign entitled "Follow the Journey". Later that month, it was revealed Six Flags Great America would be building a 165-foot-tall roller coaster (50 m), with plans to lobby the local zoning committee to exceed the 125-foot (38 m) height limit imposed on the park. The official announcement for Goliath came on August 29, 2013, where it was revealed the new wooden roller coaster would be manufactured by Rocky Mountain Construction (RMC) and open in 2014. As part of the announcement, the ride's statistics were released, along with a concept computer-animated video demonstrating the ride's layout. Situated on the site of the former Iron Wolf, Goliath utilized a majority of the station and line queue from the former ride, and the station was lengthened to accommodate the longer twelve-row trains.

Final design photos were released on Great America's Facebook page on February 21, 2014. These revealed a design change in Goliath's lift hill, which was modified to an all-steel structure as opposed to the original wood design. Another computer-animated video was also released on the park's official YouTube channel the same day.

Construction began in September 2013, employing a crew of approximately 35 workers by RMC. The team worked 11-hour days, six days a week through winter in occasional sub-zero temperatures finishing in May 2014, which amounted to approximately 40,000 man hours. Goliath was set to open on May 31, 2014, but the opening was delayed. The lift hill was topped off on May 16, with the first test run taking place two weeks later on May 31, the same day as the original opening. Lightning struck a small section of the ride's station on June 6, 2014, causing it to catch fire briefly before being extinguished. There were no reported injuries or major damage. After testing was completed, Goliath officially opened to the public on June 19, 2014.

== Characteristics ==
Goliath was Rocky Mountain Construction's second ground-up wooden roller coaster following the opening of Silver Dollar City's Outlaw Run in early 2013. Although the ride is located in the County Fair section of Six Flags Great America, the name and theme of the ride was chosen purely on the basis of the ride's size and scale. The 3,100-foot-long (940 m) ride stands 165 feet (50 m) tall; however, the ride drops a total of 180 feet (55 m) at an angle of 85° into an underground tunnel. Goliath features two inversions, two overbanked turns, and a top speed of 72 miles per hour (116 km/h). Because Goliath was built in such a small space, the lift hill is abnormally steep at an angle of 45°. The entire track was filled with grout to allow a quieter and smoother ride experience. The ride was designed by Alan Schilke.

=== Track ===
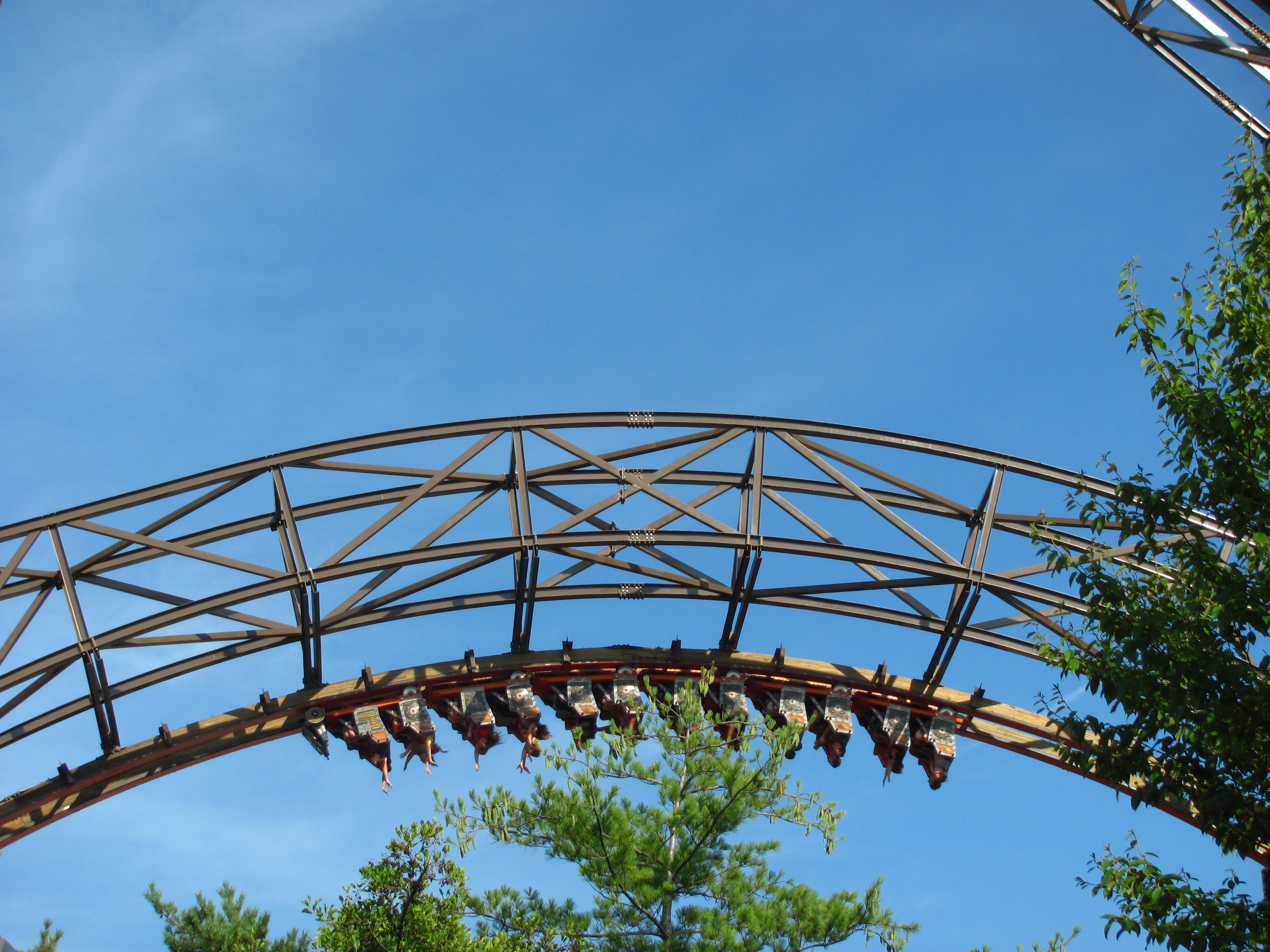
Goliath's zero gravity stall inversion

The 3,100 feet (940 m) of track is made of six layers of laminated wood, with a steel rectangular tube acting as the topmost layer of track. This type of track is known as Topper Track and allows for more dynamic roller coaster elements to be performed on a wooden roller coaster. Additionally, this track style is designed to reduce the maintenance typically required for a wooden roller coaster and to provide a smoother ride experience.

=== Trains ===
Goliath operates with two trains manufactured by Rocky Mountain Construction. Each train is made up of six cars, with riders being arranged in two rows of two for a total of 24 riders per train. This configuration caters for approximately 800 riders per hour. The trains feature polyurethane wheels, allowing for a quieter ride. Riders are restrained through the use of an individual lap bar, shin bar, and seatbelt.

== Ride experience ==
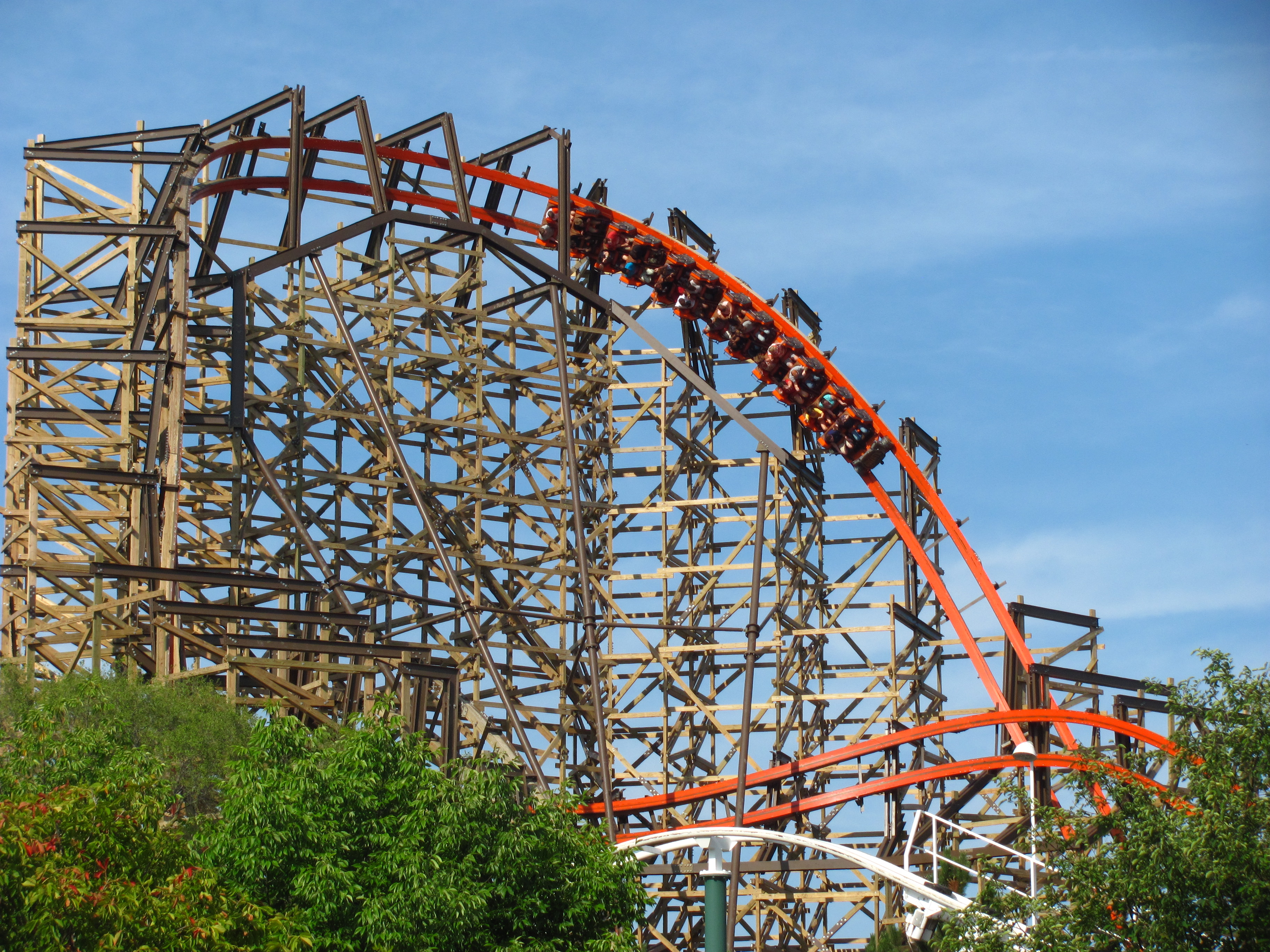
A train going through an overbanked turn on Goliath

The ride begins with a left turn out of the station before ascending the 165-foot-tall (50 m) chain lift hill at a 45° angle. From the highest point, trains drop 180 feet (55 m) at an angle of 85°, 15 feet (4.6 m) below ground level, reaching their top speed of 72 miles per hour (116 km/h). After this, cars ascend to a height of 125 feet (38 m) for an overbanked turnaround, followed by a descent back to the ground and a small air-time hill. A dive loop is next, where riders are inverted before descending a half loop. The track then enters the second inversion, a zero gravity stall, where the train is suspended upside-down as it crests over a hill underneath the lift hill. This element is followed by a second overbanked turnaround, leading to the brake run and a short path back to the station. One cycle of the ride takes approximately 105 seconds to complete.

== Records ==
Goliath claimed three records upon opening. The ride's 180-foot-tall (55 m) drop at 85° is the steepest and longest in the world for wooden roller coasters. The steepness record was held by Switchback at ZDT's Amusement Park until its closure in 2025, whose train at one point went 87 degrees. Goliath is also the fastest wooden roller coaster in the world, with a top speed of 72 miles per hour (116 km/h). After Goliath opened, Six Flags Great America had the most wooden roller coaster track of any amusement park in the world. However, this record was later surpassed by Kings Island with the opening of Mystic Timbers in 2017.

== Reception ==
The opening of Goliath was widely reported across the world, with those experiencing the ride giving positive reviews. Jessica D'Onofrio of ABC7 Chicago stated Goliath was the smoothest roller coaster she had ever been on, describing it as "a great adrenaline rush". Marcus Leshock of WGN-TV commended the uniqueness of the zero-g stall element, stating "it's something I've never really felt on a coaster before". He describes hanging upside down as a "really nice, fun, exhilarating feeling" without feeling disoriented. Reviewing the ride for Shaw Media, Taylor Trimby of American Coaster Enthusiasts described Goliath as a wonderful ride, stating "You don't have time to prepare for anything. ... You're twisting and turning. ... It's great". Anthony Murphy of Theme Park Insider praised the ride for being "one of the most intense roller coasters" he has ever ridden.

Golden Ticket Awards: Best New Ride for 2014
Ranking	3

Golden Ticket Awards: Top wood Roller Coasters
Year									1998	1999
Ranking									–	–
Year	2000	2001	2002	2003	2004	2005	2006	2007	2008	2009
Ranking	–	–	–	–	–	–	–	–	–	–
Year	2010	2011	2012	2013	2014	2015	2016	2017	2018	2019
Ranking	–	–	–	–	23	14	13	13	19	27
Year	2020	2021	2022	2023	2024	2025	2026			
Ranking	N/A	26	26	32	24	26	28			

Preceded by Outlaw Run	World's Steepest Wooden Roller Coaster; June 19, 2014 – Present	Succeeded by Current Holder
Preceded by El Toro	World's Fastest Wooden Roller Coaster; June 19, 2014 – Present	Succeeded by Current Holder
