= Clermont Steel Fabricators =

US steel products manufacturing company

Coordinates: 39.0683°N 84.1252°W

- Type: Private
- Predecessor: Southern Ohio Fabricators
- Founded: Batavia, Ohio, U.S. (June 2004)
- Headquarters: Batavia, Ohio, United States
- Number of locations: 1
- Area served: Worldwide
- Products: Roller coasters, turbine power bases and enclosures, weldments, machine bases, louvers, dampers, industrial equipment, structural steel
- Services: Manufacturing
- Number of employees: 65 (2013)
- Website: clermontsteel.com

Clermont Steel Fabricators (abbreviated as CSF) was a private steel products manufacturing company known for making Bolliger & Mabillard roller coasters. The plant was located in Batavia, Ohio. CSF was founded in 2004 after the closing of Southern Ohio Fabricators. As of 2013, Clermont had 65 employees.

== History ==
In 1989, Walter Bolliger asked Clermont's general manager, Ken Miller—who was then general manager of Southern Ohio Fabricators (SOF)—if he would be interested in manufacturing roller coasters for Bolliger's company, Bolliger & Mabillard of Switzerland. As a result, SOF manufactured its first coaster, Iron Wolf at Six Flags Great America. Prior to the project, SOF's main focus was manufacturing commercial and industrial buildings. In 2004, SOF closed and Miller and a group of investors bought the company, renaming it Clermont Steel Fabricators and making the decision to focus on coaster manufacturing.

The company manufactures other steel products, including turbine power bases and enclosures, heavy weldments, machine bases, structural steel, louvers and dampers, and industrial equipment.

== Location ==
Clermont Steel Fabricators was situated in Batavia across Old State Route 32 from the former Ford Batavia Transmission plant which closed in 2008. Its main building had 152,000 square feet (14,100 m^{2}) of production space, and there was 76,500 square feet (7,110 m^{2}) of outdoor storage space surrounding it.
