= The Riddler's Revenge =

Roller coaster at Six Flags Magic Mountain

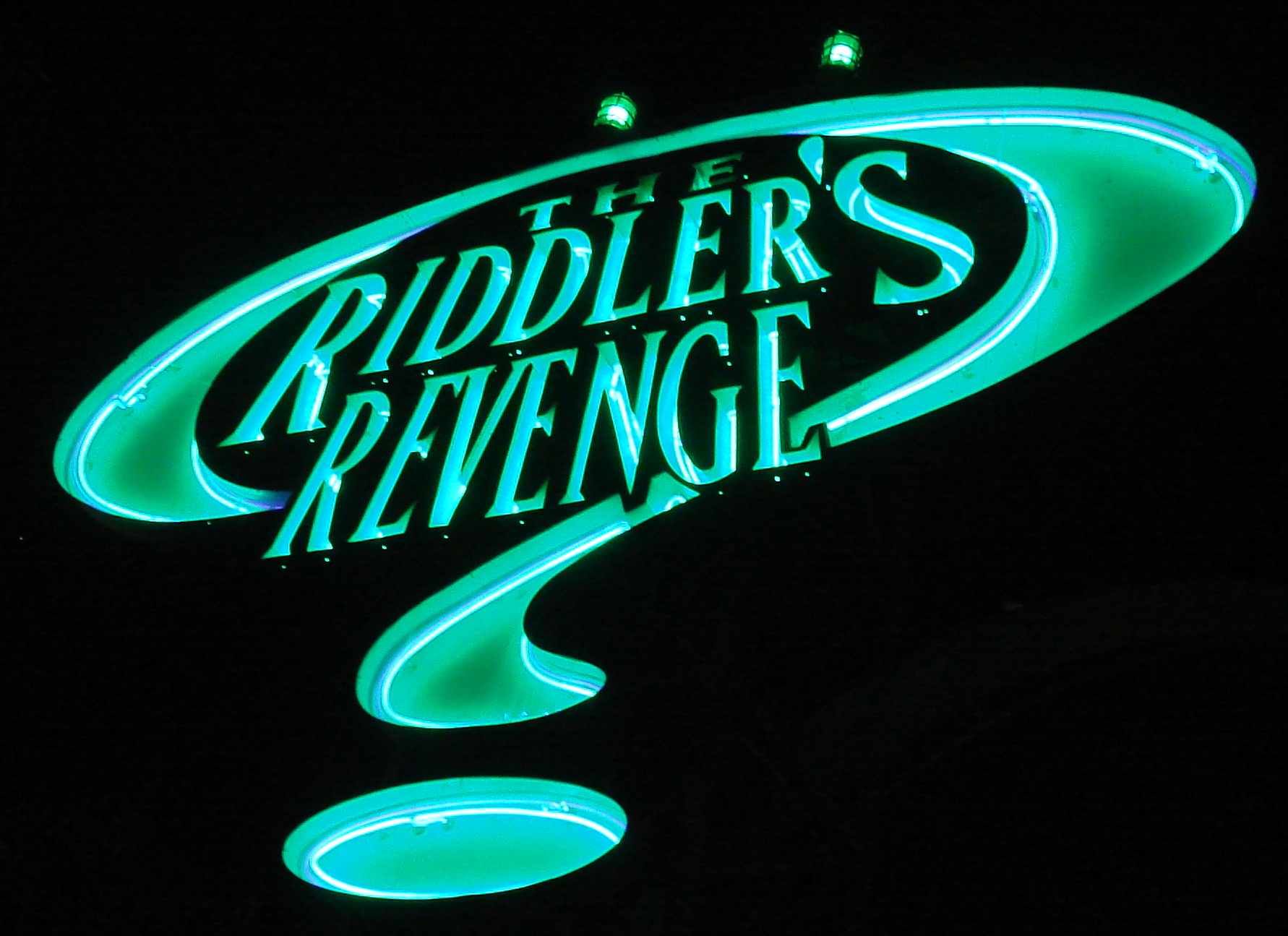

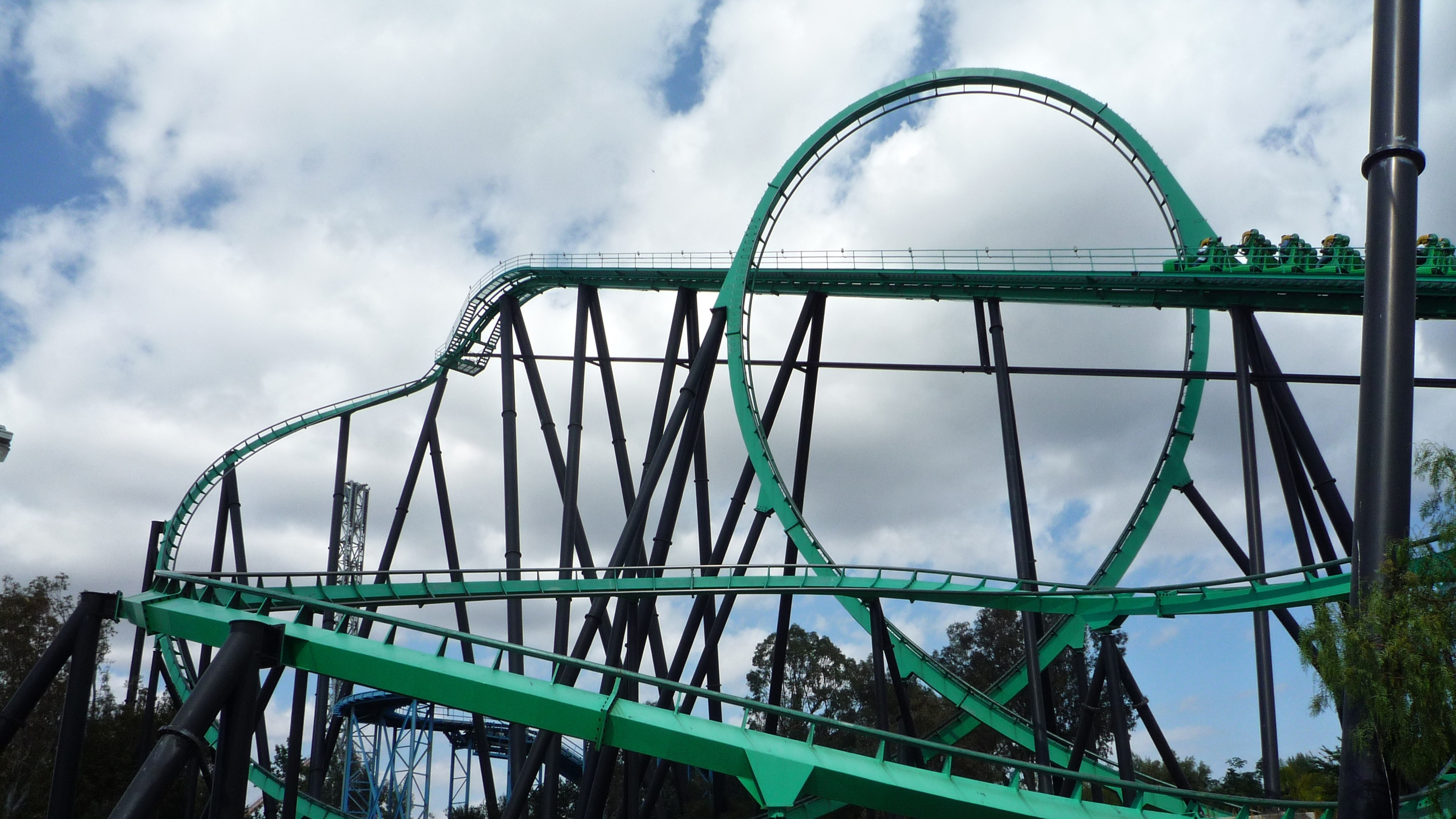
- The chain lift hill and vertical loop of Riddler's Revenge

Six Flags Magic Mountain
- Location: Six Flags Magic Mountain
- Park section: Metropolis
- Coordinates: 34.424524°N 118.600637°W
- Status: Operating
- Soft opening date: April 1, 1998
- Opening date: April 4, 1998
- Cost: US$14,000,000

General statistics
- Type: Steel – Stand-up
- Manufacturer: Bolliger & Mabillard
- Designer: Werner Stengel
- Model: Stand-Up Coaster
- Lift/launch system: Chain lift hill
- Height: 156 ft (48 m)
- Drop: 146 ft (45 m)
- Length: 4,370 ft (1,330 m)
- Speed: 65 mph (105 km/h)
- Inversions: 6
- Duration: 3:00
- Capacity: 1,610 riders per hour
- G-force: 4.2
- Height restriction: 54 in (137 cm)
- Trains: 3 trains with 8 cars; riders arranged 4 across in a single row for a total of 32 riders per train
- Fast Lane available
- The Riddler's Revenge at RCDB

The Riddler's Revenge is a steel stand-up roller coaster located at Six Flags Magic Mountain. Manufactured by Bolliger & Mabillard, the ride opened as the park's eleventh roller coaster on April 4, 1998, setting multiple world records among stand-up coasters. Originally located in the Movie District section of the park, which later became Metropolis in 2017, The Riddler's Revenge was also the park's single biggest investment at a cost of $14 million. It features a height of 156 feet (48 m), a maximum speed of 65 mph (105 km/h), six inversions, and a track length of 4,370 feet (1,330 m).

== History ==
Construction of the coaster began in late 1997. The ride's name was revealed in January 1998. It would be called The Riddler's Revenge, and would set world records for the stand-up coaster in height, drop, speed, length and number of inversions. The ride also broke the record for the world's tallest vertical loop. The previous holder of all these records was Chang at Kentucky Kingdom, which was installed exactly one year prior.

The Riddler's Revenge soft opened on April 1, 1998. Three days later on April 4, 1998, the ride officially opened. The opening of the ride was part of a redevelopment of the Monterey Landing themed area, which became a 4.9-acre (2.0 ha) themed area known as Movie District. As part of the expansion the park added new restaurants, retail outlets, and rethemed some existing rides.

In March 2000, The Riddler's Revenge conceded the title of the world's largest vertical loop to Superman: Krypton Coaster at Six Flags Fiesta Texas. The floorless roller coaster featured a 145-foot-tall (44 m) vertical loop, 21 feet (6.4 m) taller than that of The Riddler's Revenge. The park closed several rides including The Riddler's Revenge in early 2017 to begin the construction of Metropolis, a new themed area that resulted in new paint schemes along with modified entrances and exit queues for some attractions. The new area opened on July 12, 2017, which marked the reopening of The Riddler's Revenge.

== Characteristics ==
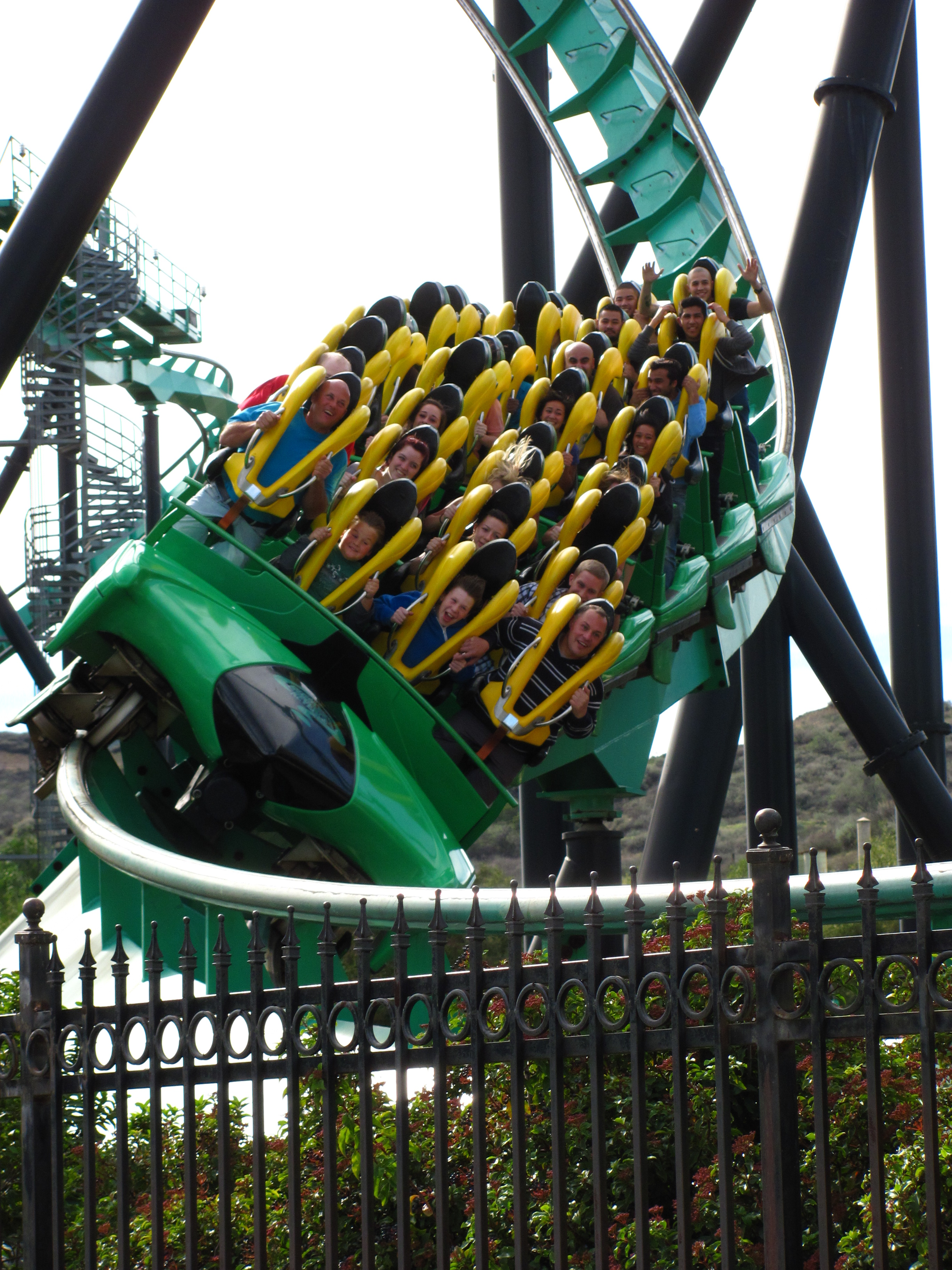
One of the trains on The Riddler's Revenge

=== Statistics ===
The 4,370-foot-long (1,330 m) Riddler's Revenge stands 156 feet (48 m) tall. With a top speed of 65 miles per hour (105 km/h), the ride features six inversions including a 124-foot-tall (38 m) vertical loop, two dive loops, an inclined loop, and two corkscrews. The vertical loop wraps around the lift hill, a rare feature that is also found on Kumba at Busch Gardens Tampa and Banshee at Kings Island. Riders experience up to 4.2 times the force of gravity on the three-minute ride.

The Riddler's Revenge operates with three steel-and-fiberglass trains. Each train has eight cars with four seats in a single row, for a total of 32 riders per train. Riders are secured by an over-the-shoulder harness. Although The Riddler's Revenge is a stand-up roller coaster, there is a small bicycle seat which riders straddle.

=== Manufacturer ===
The Riddler's Revenge is one of four Bolliger & Mabillard roller coasters at Six Flags Magic Mountain, joining Batman: The Ride, Scream, and Tatsu. The coaster is the park's second stand-up coaster; the first, Shockwave, was a smaller coaster manufactured by Giovanola and contracted by Intamin. It operated at the park from 1986 to 1988. Shockwave was relocated to Six Flags Great Adventure, preceding the installation of Green Lantern (a retheming and relocation of Chang).

=== Theme ===
As its name suggests, The Riddler's Revenge is themed after the DC Comics character Riddler. The track was originally painted green with black supports until 2017, when the supports were repainted yellow. As the Riddler was an archenemy of Batman, The Riddler's Revenge is located appropriately adjacent to Batman: The Ride, in the back of the park. The Riddler's signature question mark is featured on the coaster's logo. The techno music that played on the loading platform is Ecuador (Bruce Wayne Mix) by Sash! (Bruce Wayne being the secret identity of Riddler's nemesis, Batman).

== Ride experience ==
=== Queue and station ===
After waiting in line in the outdoor portion of the queue, guests enter a building housing the station. Prior to entering, The Flash Pass queue merges with the general queue. Guests climb a staircase and head into the boarding area. Inside, there are laser lighting special effect units mounted at various points, which use moving mirrors to reflect a green question mark shape around the interior of the queue. Near the boarding area, the line breaks into eight separate rows, with each one leading to a gate that boards a specific row on the train. There is also a separate single rider entrance and queue that leads to directly to the boarding area.

=== Layout ===
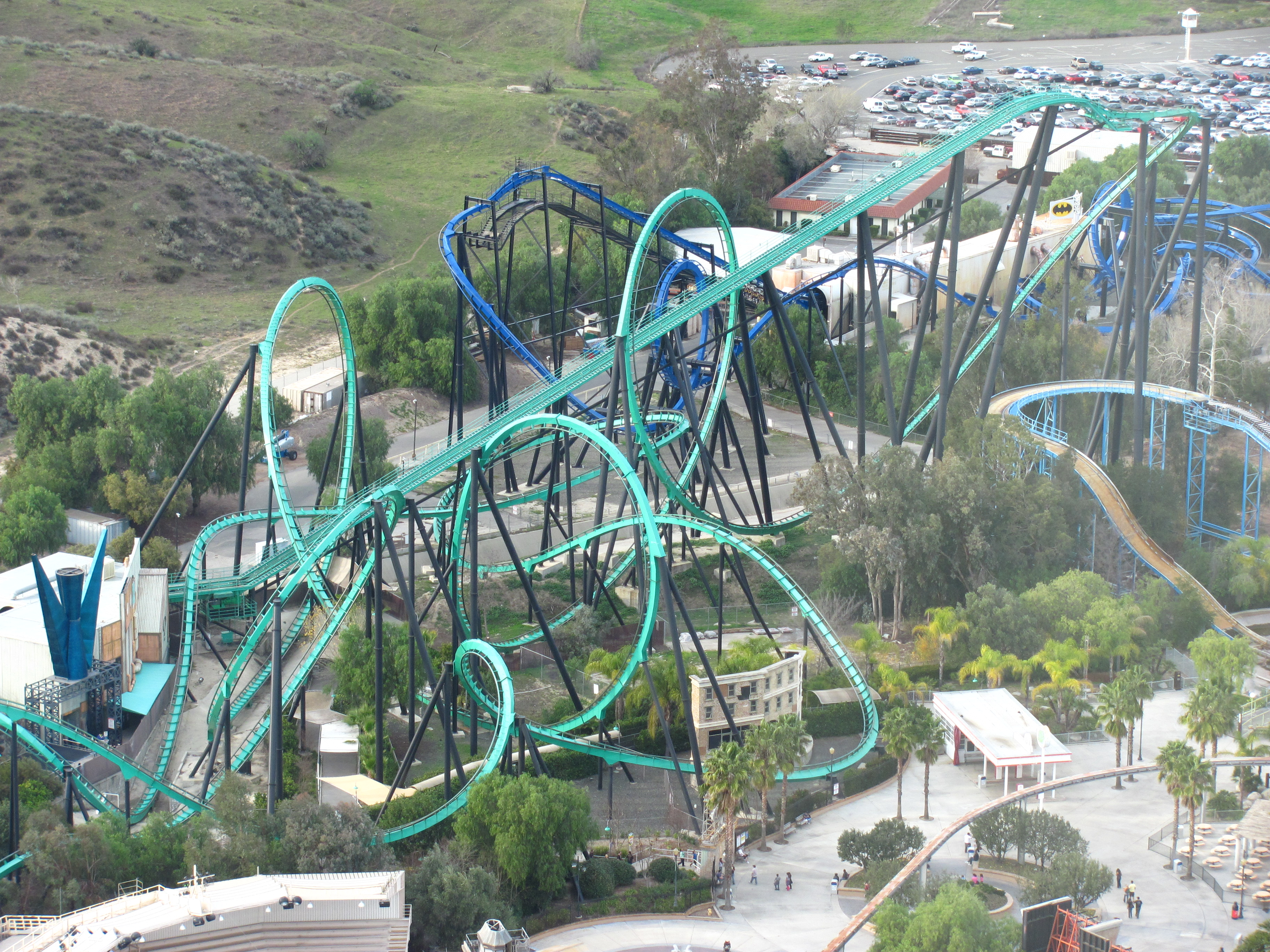
An overview of Riddler's Revenge

The ride begins with a right turn out of the station. Once the train ascends the 156-foot-tall (48 m) lift it goes through a small pre-drop, before dropping 146 feet (45 m) on a banked left turn. It then enters the 124-foot-tall (38 m) vertical loop which wraps around the lift hill. Two dive loops follow, the second of which also wraps around the lift hill. An inclined loop is followed by two right turns that lead up and into the mid-course brake run. After dropping out of the brake run, the train immediately enters a corkscrew to the left. A series of direction and elevation changes lead into a second corkscrew, the inverted part of which is just above a portion of the queue line. The track then turns to the right and enters the final brake run before returning to the station.

== Reception ==
The Riddler's Revenge has made four appearances on Amusement Today's annual Golden Ticket Awards top 50 steel roller coasters. It debuted on the poll in 2003 at position 41, before peaking at 38 in 2006.

Golden Ticket Awards: Top steel Roller Coasters
Year									1998	1999
Ranking									–	–
Year	2000	2001	2002	2003	2004	2005	2006	2007	2008	2009
Ranking	–	–	–	41	44	45	38	–	–	–
Year	2010	2011	2012	2013	2014	2015	2016	2017	2018	2019
Ranking	–	–	–	–	–	–	–	–	–	–
Year	2020	2021	2022	2023	2024	2025	2026			
Ranking	N/A	–	–	–	–	–	–			

Preceded by Chang	World's Tallest Vertical Loop; April 1998–March 2000	Succeeded by Superman: Krypton Coaster
