= Firebird (roller coaster) =

Defunct steel coaster at Six Flags America

- Previously known as Iron Wolf (1990–2011); Apocalypse (2012–2018)

Six Flags America
- Park section: Chesapeake
- Coordinates: 38°54′30″N 76°46′26″W
- Status: Closed
- Opening date: May 19, 2019
- Closing date: November 2, 2025
- Replaced: Skull Mountain

Six Flags Great America
- Name: Iron Wolf
- Park section: County Fair
- Coordinates: 42°21′58″N 87°55′52″W
- Status: Removed
- Opening date: April 28, 1990
- Closing date: September 5, 2011
- Replaced: Z-Force
- Replaced by: Goliath
- Iron Wolf at Six Flags Great America at RCDB

General statistics
- Type: Steel – Floorless Coaster
- Manufacturer: Bolliger & Mabillard
- Designer: Werner Stengel
- Model: Floorless
- Track layout: Twister
- Lift/launch system: Chain lift hill
- Height: 100 ft (30 m)
- Drop: 90 ft (27 m)
- Length: 2,900 ft (880 m)
- Speed: 55 mph (89 km/h)
- Inversions: 2
- Duration: 2:00
- Capacity: 1220 riders per hour
- Height restriction: 54–76 in (137–193 cm)
- Trains: 2 trains with 6 cars; riders arranged 4 across in a single row for a total of 24 riders per train
- Firebird at RCDB

Firebird is a defunct floorless roller coaster located at Six Flags America in Prince George's County, Maryland, United States. Originally designed as a stand-up roller coaster by Swiss manufacturer Bolliger & Mabillard (B&M), the ride first opened as Iron Wolf in 1990 at Six Flags Great America. It debuted as the tallest and fastest stand-up coaster in the world, featuring a height of 100 feet (30 m) and a maximum speed of 55 mph (89 km/h). Iron Wolf also held the distinction as being the first coaster from B&M, a company that later became one of the industry's leading coaster manufacturers. The stand-up coaster was later relocated to Six Flags America, where it reopened as Apocalypse in 2012.

After the park announced plans to retire the ride at the end of the 2018 season, they released a follow-up announcement two weeks later unveiling Firebird, a conversion from stand-up to floorless utilizing new floorless trains from B&M. The track layout remained unchanged. Firebird debuted in 2019 and operated until the park's permanent closure in 2025.

== History ==
=== Six Flags Great America (1990–2011) ===
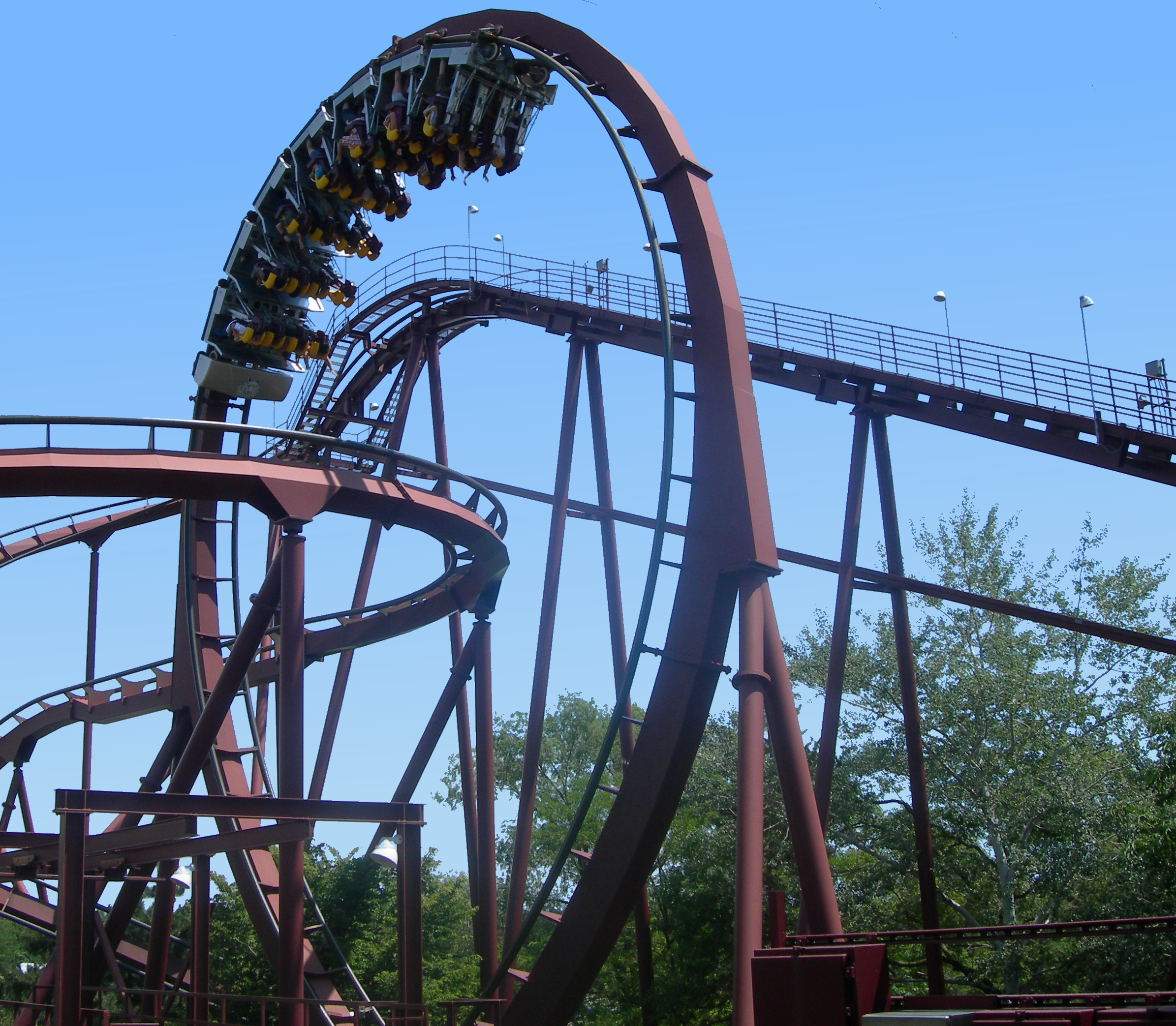
Iron Wolf at Six Flags Great America (2011)

On April 28, 1990, Iron Wolf opened at Six Flags Great America on the former site of Z-Force (the only Intamin Space Diver ever manufactured). It debuted in 1990 as the tallest and fastest stand-up roller coaster in the world. Its height record was surpassed in 1992 by Milky Way at Mitsui Greenland, which stands at 125 feet (38 m), and its speed record was exceeded by Mantis at Cedar Point in 1996, which had a maximum speed of 60 mph (97 km/h).

In 1994, Iron Wolf appeared in the movie Richie Rich as Richie's backyard roller coaster.

On August 5, 2011, Six Flags Great America announced on their official Facebook page that the Iron Wolf would be closed on September 5, 2011: "After a long 21 year history at the park, we will be removing Iron Wolf. Make sure to get your last rides in – Iron Wolf’s Last Stand is September 5". 'The Last Stand' is also a reference to the slogan afforded to Apocalypse. Iron Wolf's former site would be taken over in 2014 by a custom RMC coaster, Goliath.

=== Six Flags America (2012–present) ===
==== Apocalypse (2012–18) ====
Fire effects on Apocalypse

On August 22, 2011, Six Flags America announced on their Facebook page that they would be adding a new attraction in 2012. From this day, the park began to slowly remove burnt pieces from an envelope each days leading up to the official announcement on September 1, 2011. On September 1, 2011, Six Flags America announced that they would be adding Apocalypse in 2012.

Iron Wolf closed on September 5, 2011, and work began on preparing it for transport to its new location. The new owners planned to add the roller coaster to the Skull Island section of their park, but before the relocation could take place, the Skull Mountain ride at Six Flags America had to be closed and demolished to make room for the new attraction. Vertical construction of Apocalypse began in February 2012. This continued until the end of March 2012 when the final piece of track was installed.

The official Facebook page for Six Flags America had stated that the ride would officially open on May 25, 2012, but this was later changed to June 7, 2012.

==== Firebird (2019–present) ====
On August 16, 2018, the park announced on their social media platforms that Apocalypse would close on September 8, 2018. An announcement two weeks later on August 30 revealed that the park planned to convert Apocalypse from a stand-up to a floorless coaster, as well as rename it Firebird for the 2019 season.

A preview event for Firebird was held for Six Flags passholders at the Platinum level and higher on May 3, 2019. The floorless coaster officially opened to the public on May 17, 2019. The former Apocalypse train was donated to the National Roller Coaster Museum.

Firebird ceased operation when Six Flags America permanently closed on November 2, 2025.

== Ride experience ==
After departing the station, the train makes a 180 degree turn leading to the 100-foot (30 m) chain lift hill. Once at the top, the train goes through a pre-drop before making a sharp left hand turn leading into the first drop. Once the train is at the bottom of the first drop, it immediately goes through the first of two inversions, a vertical loop. The train then makes an upward right turn before making a left turn back down to the ground. The train continues to go left before going through an upward helix. After, the train makes a downward right s-bend leading into the second and final inversion, a corkscrew. The train makes a left turn back up before going through another s-bend, small over-banked turn which leads to the brake run. One cycle lasts about 2 minutes with riders reaching a top speed of 55 miles per hour (89 km/h).

Firebird station house

=== Trains ===
Firebird operates with two floorless trains. Each train has six rows with four each for a total of 24 riders per train.

When the roller coaster was known as Iron Wolf, both trains featured the face of a wolf on the front of the train. After the ride was relocated to Six Flags America, the wolf was removed and the word "Apocalypse" replaced it.

=== Track ===
The steel track is approximately 2,900 feet (880 m) in length and the height of the lift is approximately 100 feet (30 m). The first drop is 90 feet (27 m). The track spine is painted orange and the rails red. The supports are dark gray.

When the coaster was known as Iron Wolf at Six Flags Great America, the track was brown.

=== Theme ===
Between 1990 and 2011, when Apocalypse was known as Iron Wolf, there was no theme for the roller coaster. After its relocation to Six Flags America, to match the new name of the coaster, an end of the world apocalypse theme was added with fire, crashed planes and zombies located in the queue line and along the layout of the roller coaster. As guests went further in the queue line to the end at the station, it mimicked an end of the world apocalypse scenario. The skull from Skull Mountain also serves as a backdrop to the ride.

After being converted to Firebird, much of the Apocalypse theming has been removed. The fire effect is still used, however.

== See also ==
- 2011 in amusement parks
- 2012 in amusement parks
- 2019 in amusement parks
