= Stand-up roller coaster =

Type of roller coaster

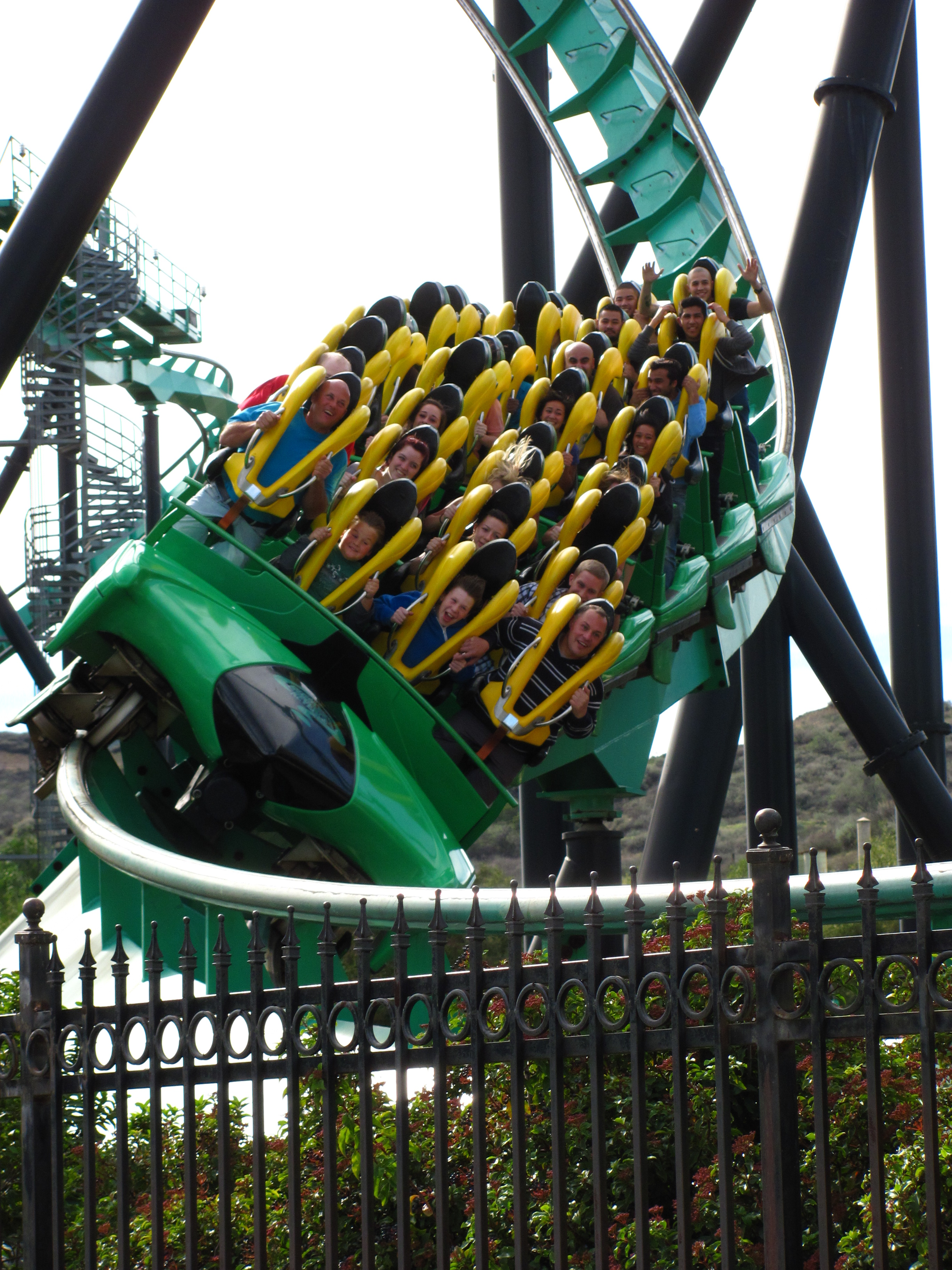
- The Riddler's Revenge, a stand-up coaster that features a vertical loop which wraps around the lift hill.
- Status: In production
- First manufactured: 1984
- No. of installations: 22 (9 in operation)
- Manufacturers: TOGO; Arrow Dynamics; Bolliger & Mabillard; Intamin
- First retrofit: 1982

A stand-up roller coaster is a roller coaster where passengers aboard a train stand throughout the course of the ride. The first manufacturer to employ the format was TOGO, a Japanese company that converted two traditional roller coasters in 1982 to stand-up configurations. Arrow Dynamics followed suit in the United States the following year with their own conversion. The first roller coaster designed from the ground up as a stand-up coaster was King Cobra, built by TOGO, which opened at Kings Island in 1984. Intamin and Bolliger & Mabillard (B&M) have also designed stand-up models beginning in the 1990s, with the latest opening in 2023 as Pipeline: The Surf Coaster in SeaWorld Orlando, which was the first stand up roller coaster built since 1999's Georgia Scorcher at Six Flags Over Georgia.

Although riders stand, they have access to a height-adjustable bicycle seat in many configurations. Older designs from the now-defunct TOGO typically used over-the-shoulder or lap-bar restraints to secure riders. B&M models add a seat belt that connects the bicycle seat to the harness for additional security.

== History ==
The first stand-up roller coasters in the world were originally built as sit-down roller coasters. Japanese manufacturer TOGO designed stand-up roller coasters that were first deployed in 1982 on Momonga Standing & Loop Coaster, originally built in 1979 at Yomiuriland in Tokyo, Japan. The same change was also performed on Dangai at the former Thrill Valley amusement park in Gotemba, Shizuoka, Japan. Both rides added stand-up trains in 1982, with Dangai opening one day before Momonga Standing & Loop Coaster.

The first stand-up roller coaster in the United States was also a former sit-down model. Screamroller at Worlds of Fun was a common corkscrew layout found at multiple parks and was built by Arrow Dynamics in 1976. In 1983, Arrow designed its own stand-up train for the attraction, and the ride was subsequently renamed ExtremeRoller after the trains were added. The original sit-down trains were reinstalled several years later. Arrow retrofitted another coaster in 1984 called River King Mine Train, which originally debuted at the grand opening of Six Flags St. Louis in 1971. Arrow added stand-up trains for the 1984 season, and the attraction was renamed Rail Blazer. The track wasn't intended for use with stand-up trains, and a fatal accident in 1984 – involving a passenger that was ejected from her seat – prompted a recall of the trains. The original trains and name of the ride were restored in 1985.

TOGO set out to design the first ever stand-up roller coaster from the ground up and successfully tested a prototype in the parking lot of their Tokyo plant. Named Astro-Comet, the prototype was purchased by Kings Island, an amusement park in the US looking for the proper ride to celebrate the 100th anniversary of America's first roller coaster. It opened at Kings Island in 1984 as King Cobra and operated until 2001.

In 1986, Intamin built their first stand up coaster, Shockwave at Six Flags Magic Mountain (later renamed Batman: The Escape and relocated to the now-defunct Six Flags AstroWorld), which used four across seating and their new box spine track, and featured Intamin's first vertical loop. In 2005, it was disassembled and placed in storage at Six Flags Darien Lake, where it sat until its eventual removal in 2017.

The most recent stand-up roller coaster to be manufactured (the first since 1999's Georgia Scorcher at Six Flags Over Georgia) was SeaWorld Orlando's surfing-themed Pipeline: The Surf Coaster, which opened on May 27, 2023. In addition to surfboard-designed cars, Pipeline features modernized and comfortable vest restraints and bicycle-style seats which move several inches up and down, to simulate the feelings of actually surfing. Unlike the older style, it also features two across seating and a launch.

Since 2015, several stand-up roller coasters have been converted into more traditional sit-down or floorless roller coasters, in response to rider discomfort with the standing position and saddle seats of stand-up coaster cars. This included Mantis in 2015, Vortex in 2017, Apocalypse in 2019, and Shockwave in 2024.

== Design ==
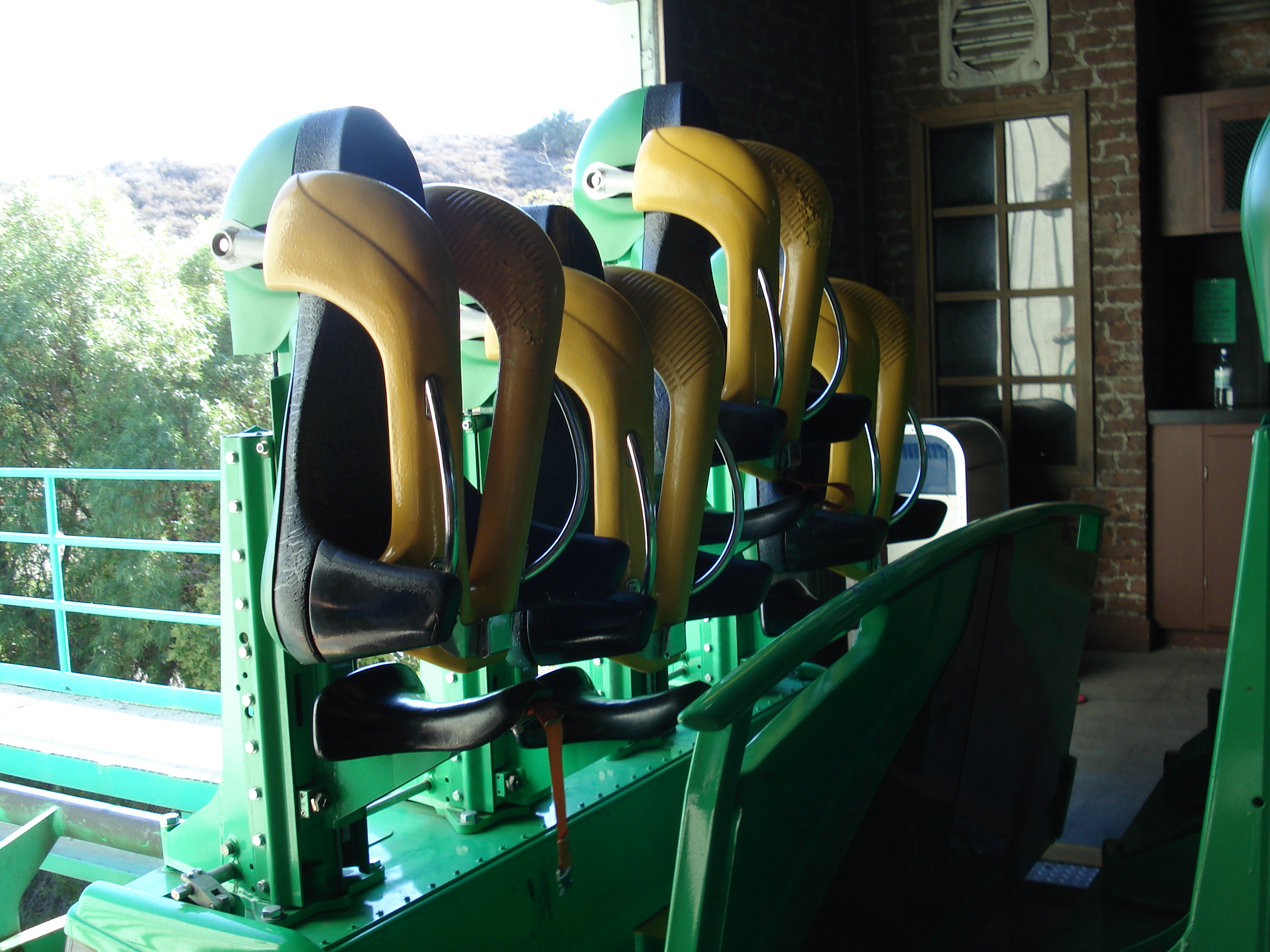
Trains feature saddle seats that move vertically to accommodate various heights. (The Riddler's Revenge at Six Flags Magic Mountain)

Three manufacturers—TOGO, Intamin and Bolliger & Mabillard—have constructed multiple stand-up roller coasters. TOGO's stand-up models feature cars that seat four passengers in two rows of two. Models from Intamin and B&M also seat four riders per car, but in a single four-abreast row.

On a standard roller coaster, the rider is held in their seat by some form of harness, such as a lap bar or an over-the-shoulder restraint. As stand-up roller coasters, by their design, do not have "seats," the harness system must both restrain and support the rider. Typical stand-up roller coaster harnesses are mounted on vertical posts, which allow the harness to adjust to riders of different heights. At the bottom is a seat resembling that on a bicycle, while at the top is an over-the-shoulder harness. TOGO models normally use a lap bar to further secure riders, while B&M models add a seat belt to connect the bicycle seat to the shoulder harness.

With some exceptions, stand-up roller coasters normally feature at least one inversion. These inversions can include vertical loops, inclined loops, dive loops and corkscrews. Only one stand-up roller coaster, the Shockwave at Drayton Manor Theme Park in the United Kingdom, includes a zero-gravity roll.

== Installations ==
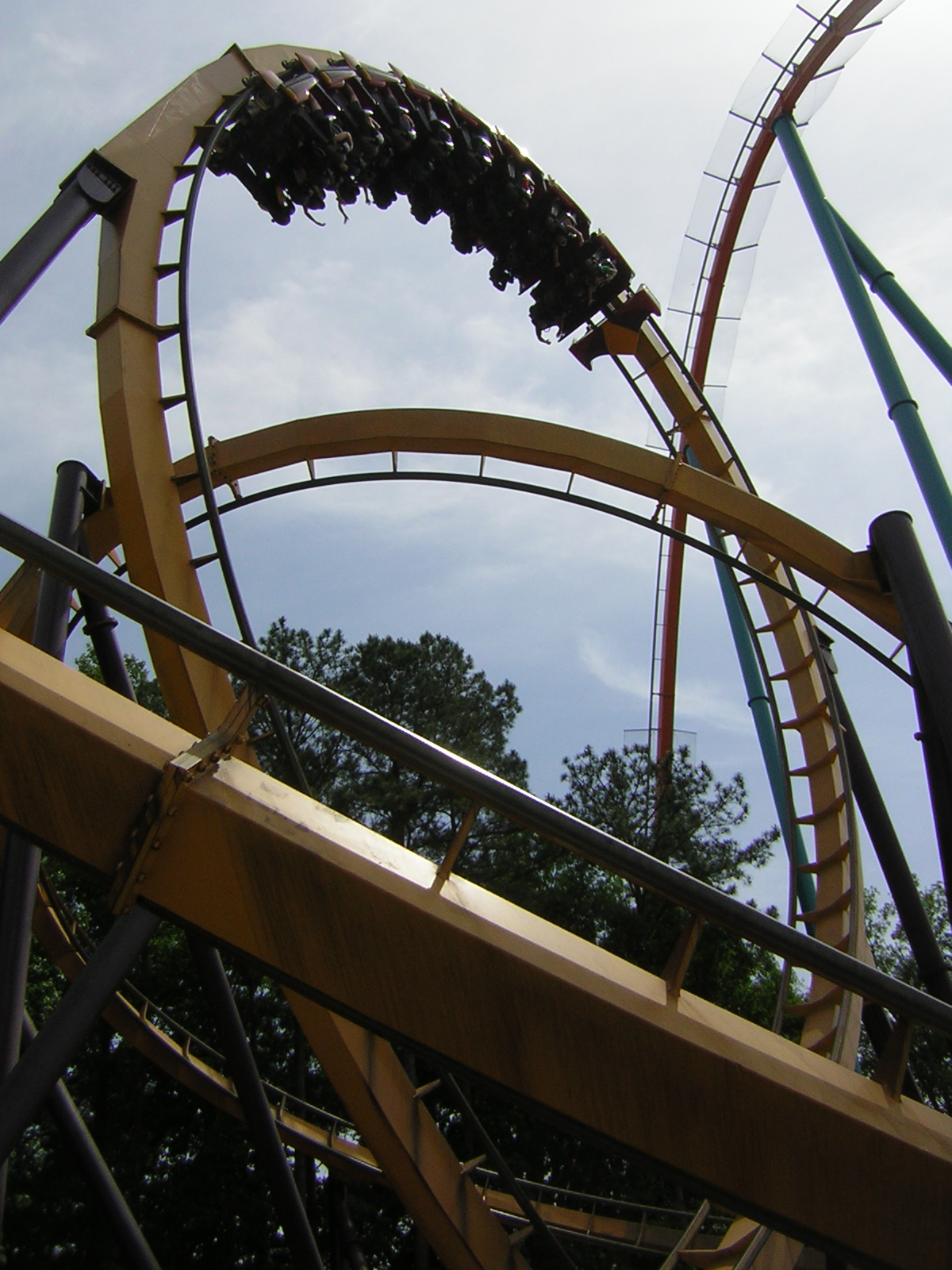
Georgia Scorcher, a 1999 stand-up coaster.

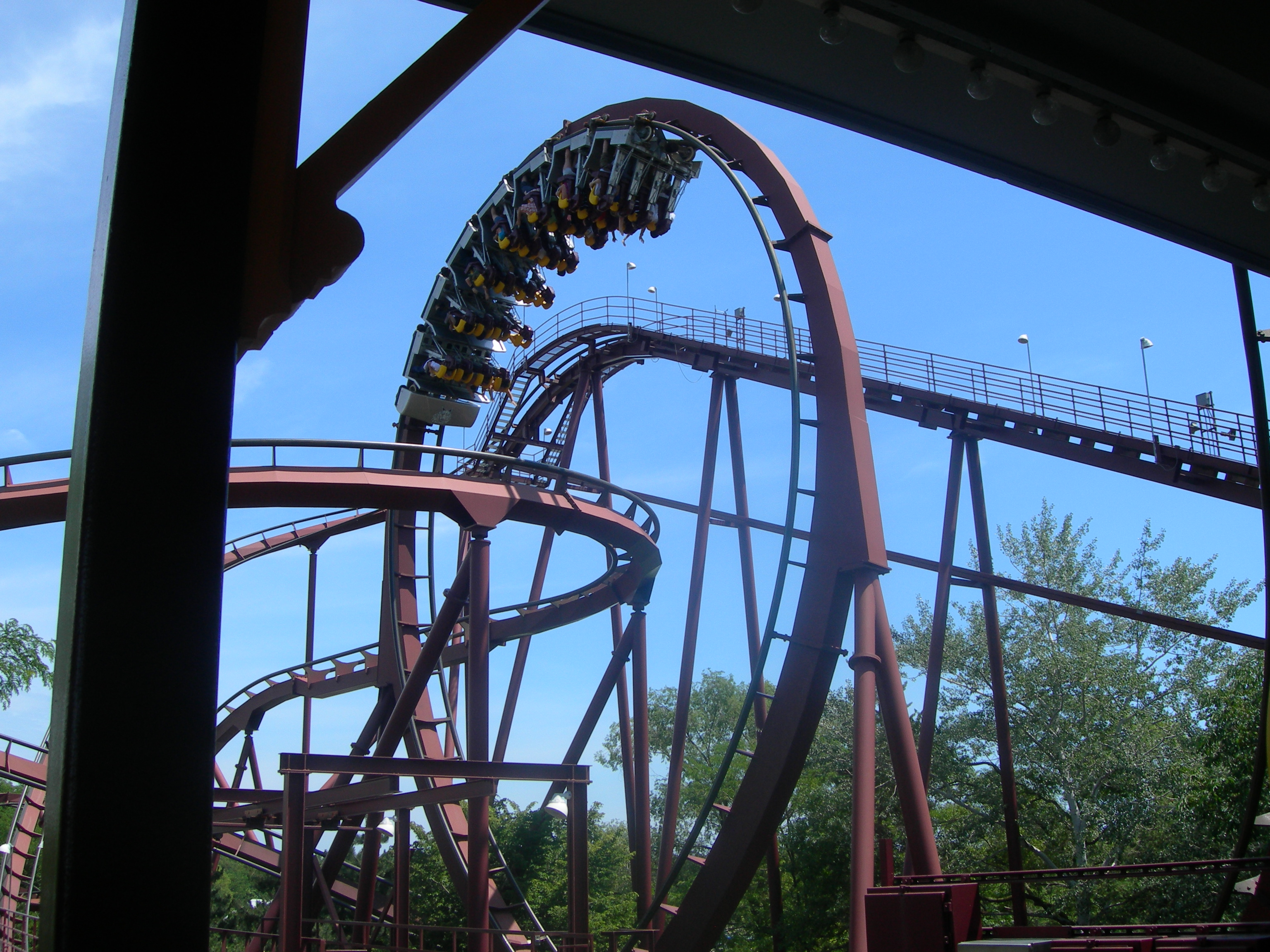
The first Bolliger & Mabillard stand-up coaster as well as the first roller coaster that Bollinger & Mabillard ever built, Iron Wolf.

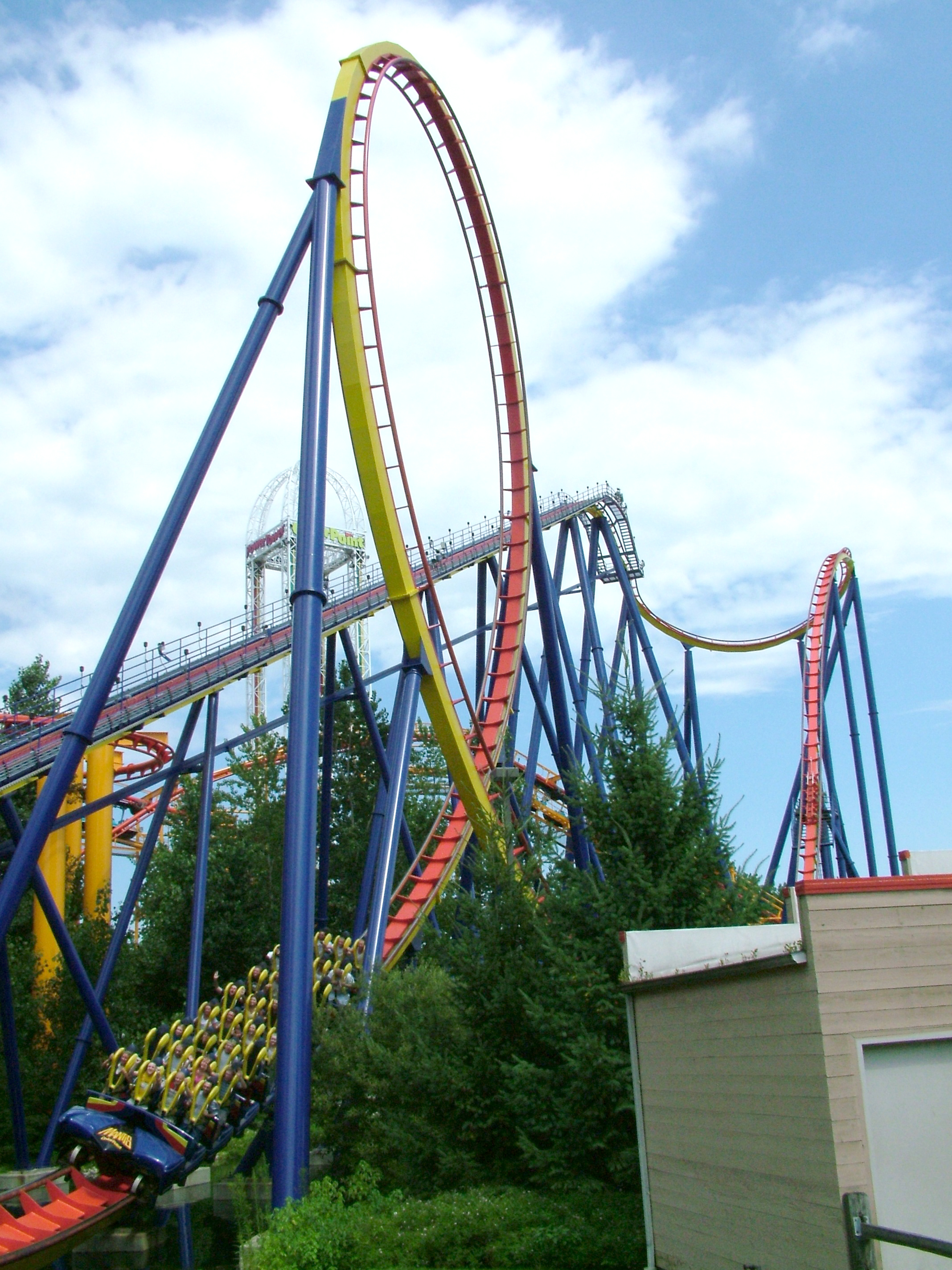
Mantis, a former Bolliger & Mabillard stand-up coaster.

=== Modified stand-up roller coasters ===
Name	Park	Manufacturer	Opened	Closed	Details
Momonga Standing and Loop Coaster	Yomiuriland	TOGO	1979	2021	Stand-up trains added in 1982
Dangai	Thrill Valley	TOGO	1982	2002	Stand-up trains added in 1982
Extremeroller	Worlds of Fun	Arrow Dynamics	1976	1988	Stand-up trains in added 1983, removed several years later
Rail Blazer	Six Flags St. Louis	Arrow Dynamics	1971	—N/a	Stand-up trains added in 1984, removed in 1985
Pink Typhoon Standing Coaster (formerly Star Jet)	Washuzan Highland	TOGO	1986	—N/a	Stand-up train added on or before 1998

=== Purpose-built stand-up roller coasters ===
Name	Park	Manufacturer	Opened	Closed	Details
King Cobra	Kings Island	TOGO	1984	2001	
Standing Coaster	Rusutsu Resort	TOGO	1985	—N/a	
Shockwave	Kings Dominion	TOGO	1986	2015	
Milky Way	Mitsui Greenland	TOGO	1991	—N/a	
Vortex	California's Great America	Bolliger & Mabillard	1991	2016	Converted to a floorless coaster (Patriot) in 2017
Vortex	Carowinds	Bolliger & Mabillard	1992	—N/a	
Fujin Raijin II	Expoland	TOGO	1992	2007	
Batman The Escape	Six Flags AstroWorld	Intamin	1993	2005	Formerly called Shockwave at Six Flags Great Adventure and Six Flags Magic Mountain
Shockwave	Drayton Manor Resort	Intamin	1994	2023	Converted to a sit-down coaster, The Wave in 2024
Cobra	La Ronde	Intamin	1995	2016	Formerly Stand Up at Skara Sommarland (1988–1994)
Mantis	Cedar Point	Bolliger & Mabillard	1996	2014	Converted to a floorless coaster, Rougarou, in 2015
Riddler's Revenge	Six Flags Magic Mountain	Bolliger & Mabillard	1998	—N/a	
Georgia Scorcher	Six Flags Over Georgia	Bolliger & Mabillard	1999	—N/a	
Green Lantern	Six Flags Great Adventure	Bolliger & Mabillard	2011	2024	Formerly Chang at Kentucky Kingdom (1997–2009)
Apocalypse	Six Flags America	Bolliger & Mabillard	2012	2018	Formerly Iron Wolf at Six Flags Great America (1990–2011); Converted to a floorless coaster, Firebird, in 2019
Freestyle	Cavallino Matto	TOGO	2015	—N/a	Formerly Skyrider at Canada's Wonderland (1985–2014)
Pipeline: The Surf Coaster	SeaWorld Orlando	Bolliger & Mabillard	2023	—N/a	First launched stand-up coaster

== Timeline ==
Each row is a coaster, multiple cells in a row show relocations.
