= Rougarou (roller coaster) =

Steel roller coaster at Cedar Point

- Previously known as Mantis (1996–2014)

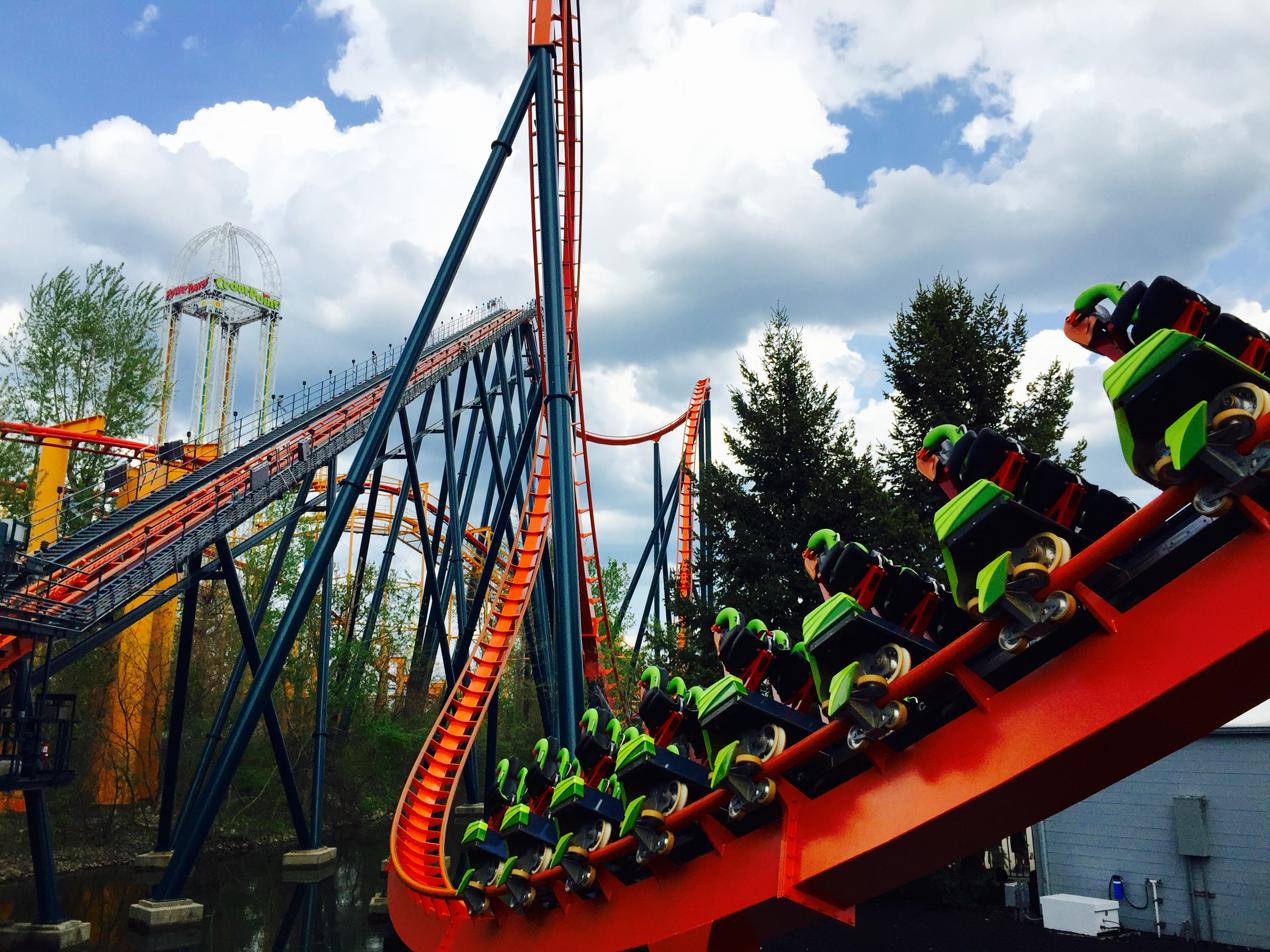
- A train coming out of the loop following the first drop

Cedar Point
- Location: Cedar Point
- Park section: Millennium Midway
- Coordinates: 41.482583°N 82.687353°W
- Status: Operating
- Opening date: May 9, 2015
- Cost: US$12,000,000
- Replaced: Mantis

General statistics
- Type: Steel – Floorless Coaster
- Manufacturer: Bolliger & Mabillard
- Designer: Werner Stengel
- Model: Floorless Coaster
- Lift/launch system: Chain lift hill
- Height: 145 ft (44 m)
- Drop: 137 ft (42 m)
- Length: 3,900 ft (1,200 m)
- Speed: 60 mph (97 km/h)
- Inversions: 4
- Duration: 2:40
- Max vertical angle: 52°
- Capacity: 1800 riders per hour
- Height restriction: 54–78 in (137–198 cm)
- Trains: 3 trains with 8 cars; riders arranged 4 across in a single row for a total of 32 riders per train
- Fast Lane available
- Rougarou at RCDB

Rougarou, formerly known as Mantis, is a floorless roller coaster located at Cedar Point amusement park in Sandusky, Ohio. Designed and built by Bolliger & Mabillard, the roller coaster originally opened in 1996 as a stand-up roller coaster called Mantis, which at the time was the tallest, fastest, and longest of its kind in the world. Cedar Point had planned to name the ride Banshee, but due to negative publicity following the announcement, the name was later changed to Mantis.

In September 2014, Cedar Point announced the pending closure of Mantis, scheduled for the following month. The park later revealed that Mantis would not be removed but would be transformed into a floorless roller coaster design for the 2015 season. It reopened as Rougarou on May 9, 2015.

== History ==
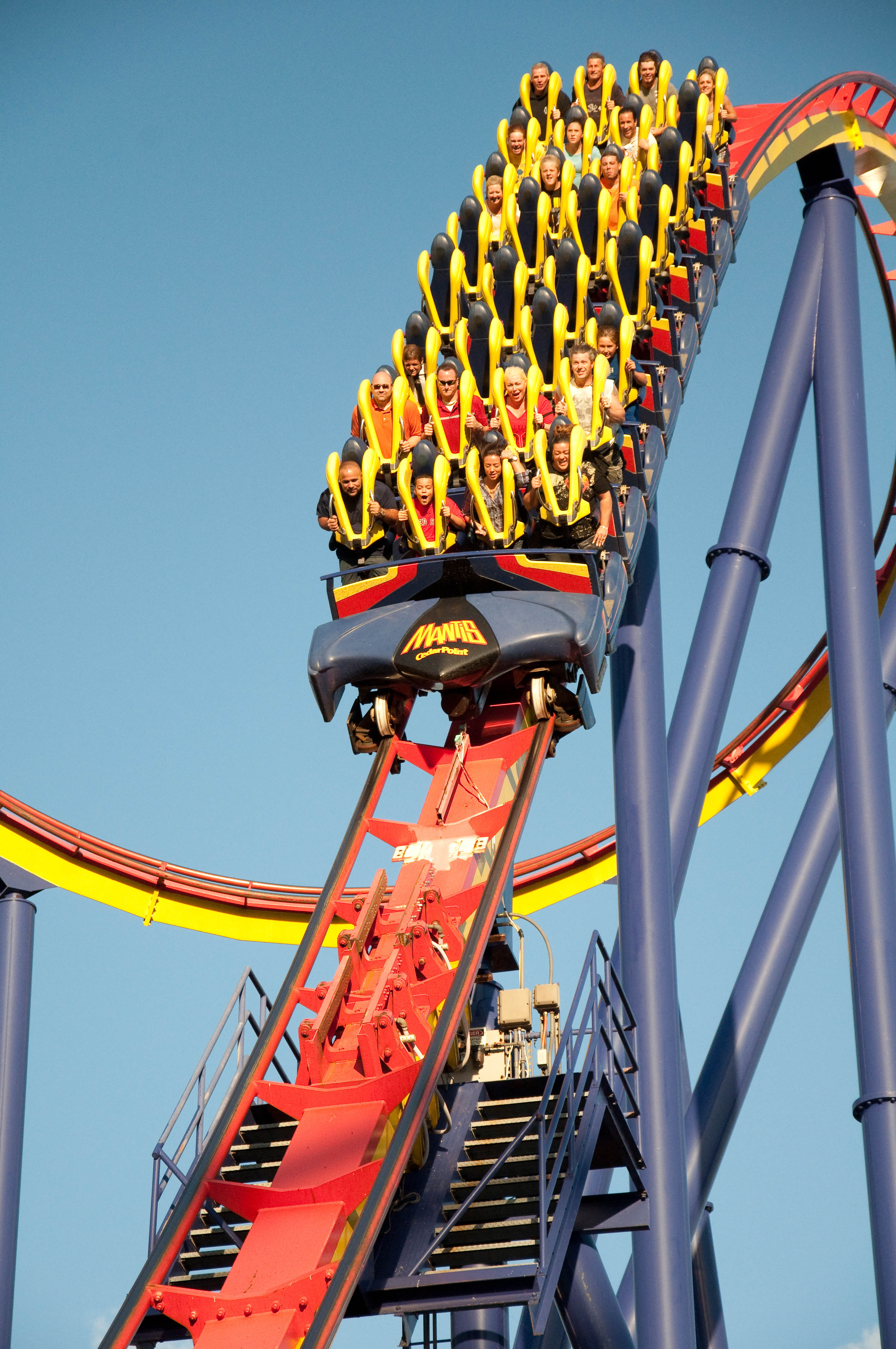
Rougarou when it operated as Mantis

On September 8, 1995, Cedar Point announced plans to build a new roller coaster, which would open as the tallest, fastest, and longest stand-up roller coaster in the world. The ride was to be named Banshee after the mythical wailing ghost in Irish folklore. In the days following the announcement, there was some negative reaction from the public regarding the term Banshee, which in the dictionary is described as a female spirit that warns of an impending family death. On November 14, 1995, Cedar Fair Entertainment Company filed a trademark for the name Mantis, which later became the ride's official name. As a result of the name change, its logo was also changed to resemble a mantis. The discarded logo would be repurposed by Dorney Park for use on Steel Force, while the Banshee name was eventually used for an inverted roller coaster that opened at Kings Island in 2014.

Construction on the new roller coaster began during the 1995-1996 off-season and was completed on January 9, 1996. More than 20% of the track was built over water. Cedar Point held a "Media Day" for Mantis on May 9, 1996, and the ride officially opened to the public on May 11, 1996.

Over the years, Mantis became known as a rough ride and its popularity began to decline. On September 2, 2014, after weeks of leaking clues that a major announcement was forthcoming, Cedar Point released a statement that Mantis would close on October 19, 2014. According to the park, the roller coaster had given over 22 million rides since its debut. However, Cedar Point revealed on September 18, 2014, that Mantis would not be removed, but instead would be converted into a floorless roller coaster complete with new trains, new colors, and a new theme. It reopened as Rougarou, the name of a legendary creature in French folklore that draws comparisons to the mythical werewolf, on May 9, 2015.

== Ride experience ==
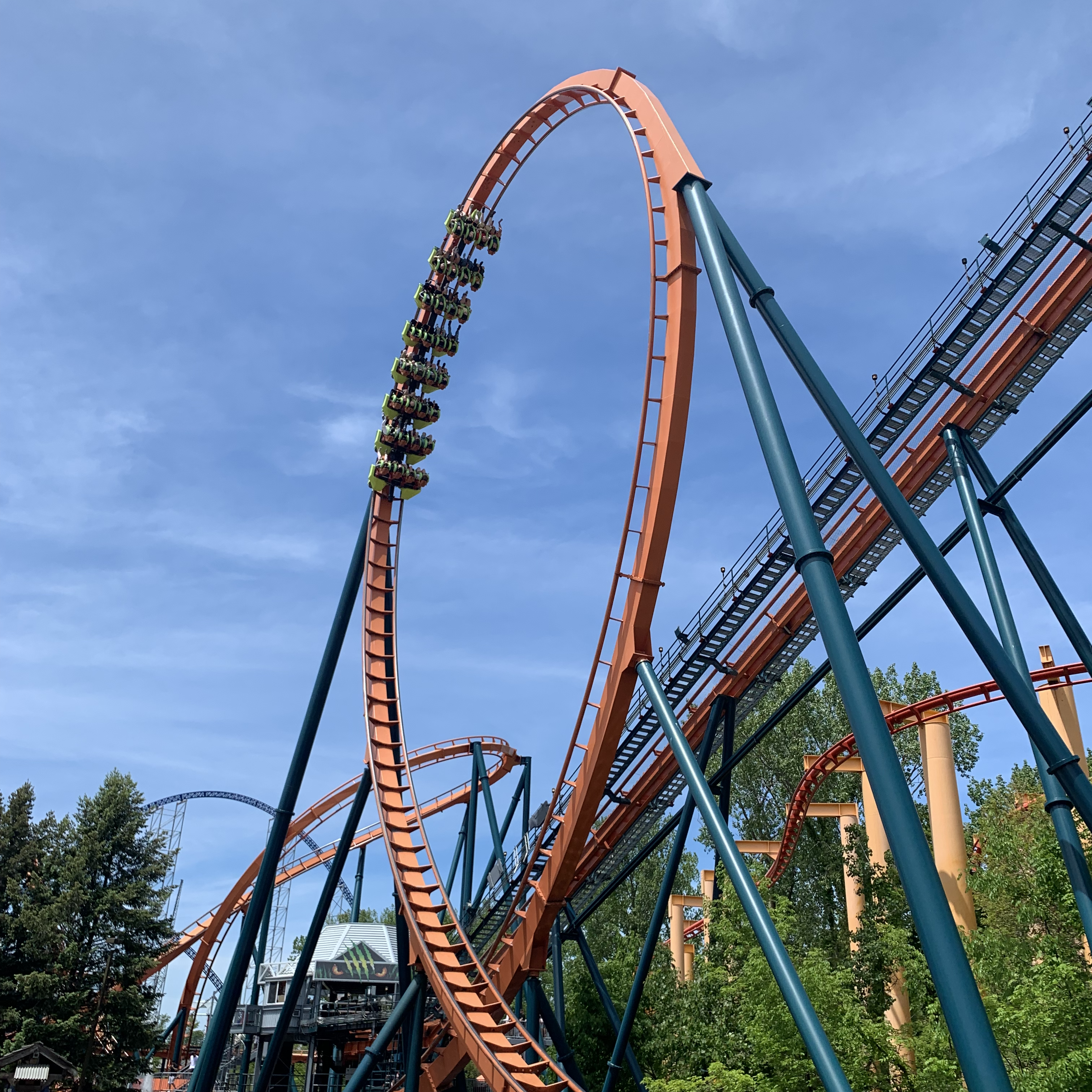
Rougarou's 119-foot-tall (36 m) vertical loop

=== Layout ===
Rougarou train going through loop

The ride starts with a slight left-turn and then the train begins to climb up the 145-foot (44 m) chain lift hill. Once the train reaches the top and passes through the pre-drop, the track makes a 180-degree right turn, leading into the first drop. Riders then drop 137 feet (42 m) at a 52-degree angle, reaching a top speed of 60 miles per hour (97 km/h) and enter a 119-foot (36 m) vertical loop. This is immediately followed by a 103-foot (31 m) dive loop, a non-inverting overbanked turn directly above the station, and an 83-foot (25 m) left-leaning inclined loop. From here, the track makes an uphill right turn into the mid-course brake run. Off the midcourse brakes, the track drops into a Corkscrew, and finish off with a figure-eight turn. The train then enters the final brake run, and then makes a right turn, passing through the transfer track before returning to the station.

=== Trains ===
As Mantis, the ride operated with two steel and fiberglass trains. Each train had eight cars with four seats in a single row supporting a total capacity of 32 riders. Mantis originally operated with three trains but the park later reduced operation to two trains due to the trains "stacking" on the brake run. Riders were secured by an over-the-shoulder harness. Although Mantis was a stand-up roller coaster, there was a small bicycle seat riders could lean on. Following the closure of Mantis, a portion of the trains were retained for parts while the rest were scrapped.

For its transition to Rougarou, the ride received three new floorless trains which allows riders' legs to dangle freely above the track, as there is no floor between rows. Each has the same 32-rider configuration as the previous trains on Mantis. Riders are also secured by an over-the-shoulder harness with an interlocking seatbelt.

== Records ==
Mantis set several records among stand-up roller coasters when it opened in 1996. It set the world record for height at 145 feet (44 m), speed at 60 miles per hour (97 km/h), and length at 3,900 feet (1,200 m). It was also the first stand-up roller coaster to feature a dive loop and an inclined loop.
