= Manta =

Manta or mantas may refer to:

- Manta ray, large fish belonging to the genus Mobula
  - Manta the former genus that manta rays belonged to, now a synonym of Mobula

== Arts and entertainment ==
=== App & Website ===
- Manta (platform), a Korean digital comics provider

=== Fictional entities ===
- Manta (comics), a character in American Marvel Comics publications
- Manta (Uridium), a spaceship in the British computer game Uridium
- Manta Oyamada, a character in the Japanese manga series Shaman King
- Manta and Moray, amphibious superheroes from the 1970s TV series Tarzan and the Super 7

=== Film ===
- Manta, Manta, a 1991 German-language action comedy film

== People ==
- Manta (surname) (includes a list of people with that name)
- Mantas, Lithuanian given name (includes a list of people with that name)
- Manta people, nomadic ethnic group in Bangladesh
- Manta (musician), an alias of Irish musician Liam McCay/Sign Crushes Motorist

== Places ==
- Manta, Benin a town and arrondissement in Atakora department, Benin
- Manta, Cundinamarca, a municipality and town Almeidas province, Colombia
- Manta, Ecuador, a city in Manabí Province, Ecuador
  - Manta Canton
  - Eloy Alfaro International Airport, formerly Forward Operating Base Manta
  - Manta Fútbol Club
- Manta, Piedmont, a municipality in Cuneo, Italy
- Manta, Cahul, a commune in Cahul district, Moldova
- Mantaş, Tarsus, a village in Mersin Province, Turkey

== Transportation ==
- Manta Cars, American manufacturer of the Manta Mirage and Manta Montage
- Aeros del Sur Manta, an Argentine ultralight trike aircraft
- Opel Manta, a German car
- HSV Manta, an Australian car
- TR-3A Black Manta, an American surveillance aircraft
- USS Manta, two U.S. Navy ships/submarines
- Lockheed Martin X-44 MANTA, an American concept aircraft
- Manta Foxbat, an American ultralight aircraft by Manta Products Inc

== Other uses ==
- Manta (dress), a traditional dress of indigenous peoples of the Americas
- Manta (SeaWorld San Diego), a roller coaster
- Manta (SeaWorld Orlando), a roller coaster
- M.A.N.T.A., a G.I. Joe toy
- Manta Force, a British toy
- Manta language, a Grassfields language of Cameroon
- Operation Manta, the French military intervention in Chad 1983–1984
- Manti (food), or manta, a type of dumpling in central Asian and Turkic cuisines
- Google Nexus 10, an Android tablet computer with the codename manta.

== See also ==
- Mant (disambiguation)
- Mantas (disambiguation)
- Mantra (disambiguation)
- Manta Ray (disambiguation)
- Black Manta, a character in American DC Comics publications
