= Mantas (disambiguation) =

Mantas is a Lithuanian given name.

Mantas may also refer to:

- Plural for any from Manta (disambiguation)
- Cheshmeh Mantash, a.k.a. Chashmeh Mantas
- Herkus Mantas, leader of the Great Prussian Uprising
- Jeffrey Dunn (born 1961), British guitarist known as Mantas
- Nick Mantas (born 1983), Canadian politician
- Mantas, an early name for the band Death
