= Acrobat (roller coaster) =

Roller coaster at Nagashima Spa Land

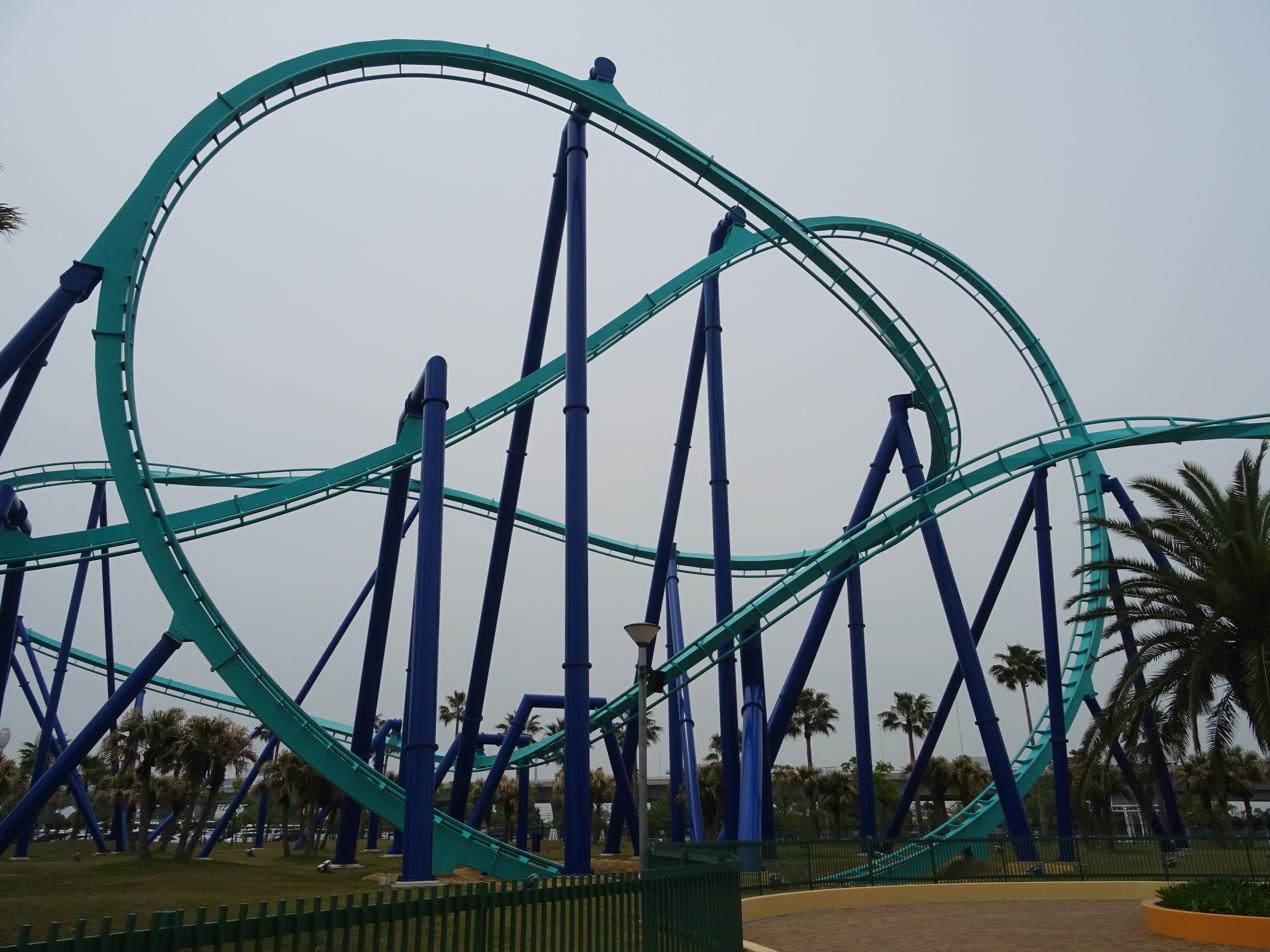

Nagashima Spa Land
- Location: Nagashima Spa Land
- Coordinates: 35.0322312°N 136.7298843°E
- Status: Operating
- Opening date: 18 July 2015

General statistics
- Type: Steel – Flying
- Manufacturer: Bolliger & Mabillard
- Model: Flying Coaster (Manta)
- Lift/launch system: Chain lift hill
- Height: 43 m (141 ft)
- Length: 1,021 m (3,350 ft)
- Speed: 90 km/h (56 mph)
- Inversions: 4
- Duration: 3:00
- Height restriction: 135–198 cm (4 ft 5 in – 6 ft 6 in)
- Acrobat at RCDB

Acrobat (Japanese: アクロバット, romanized: Akurobatto) is a flying roller coaster built by Swiss ride manufacturers Bolliger & Mabillard (B&M), located at Nagashima Spa Land in Kuwana, Mie Prefecture, Japan. The coaster debuted on 18 July 2015.

The 1,021-metre (3,350 ft) long track is 43 metres (141 ft) tall and features four inversions: a pretzel loop, two inline twists, and a corkscrew. The ride is a clone of another of B&M's flying coasters, Manta, located at SeaWorld Orlando in Florida.

== Ride experience ==
Riders start by being tilted up into the flying position, before departing the station and making a slight left- or right-hand turn onto the hill, due to the dual-station design. After ascending the lift, the train goes through a slight right-hand drop into the pretzel loop. After the pretzel loop, you do a slight left-hand drop and an inline twist into a right-hand drop. After the drop, the train goes through a zero-g roll and into the midcourse brake run. After the midcourse, the train goes through a right turn and a drop towards a pond, with fountains going off as it skims the pond. After, the train goes into a final right-hand turn into an inline twist, into a left turn, and into the brakes.

== Gallery ==
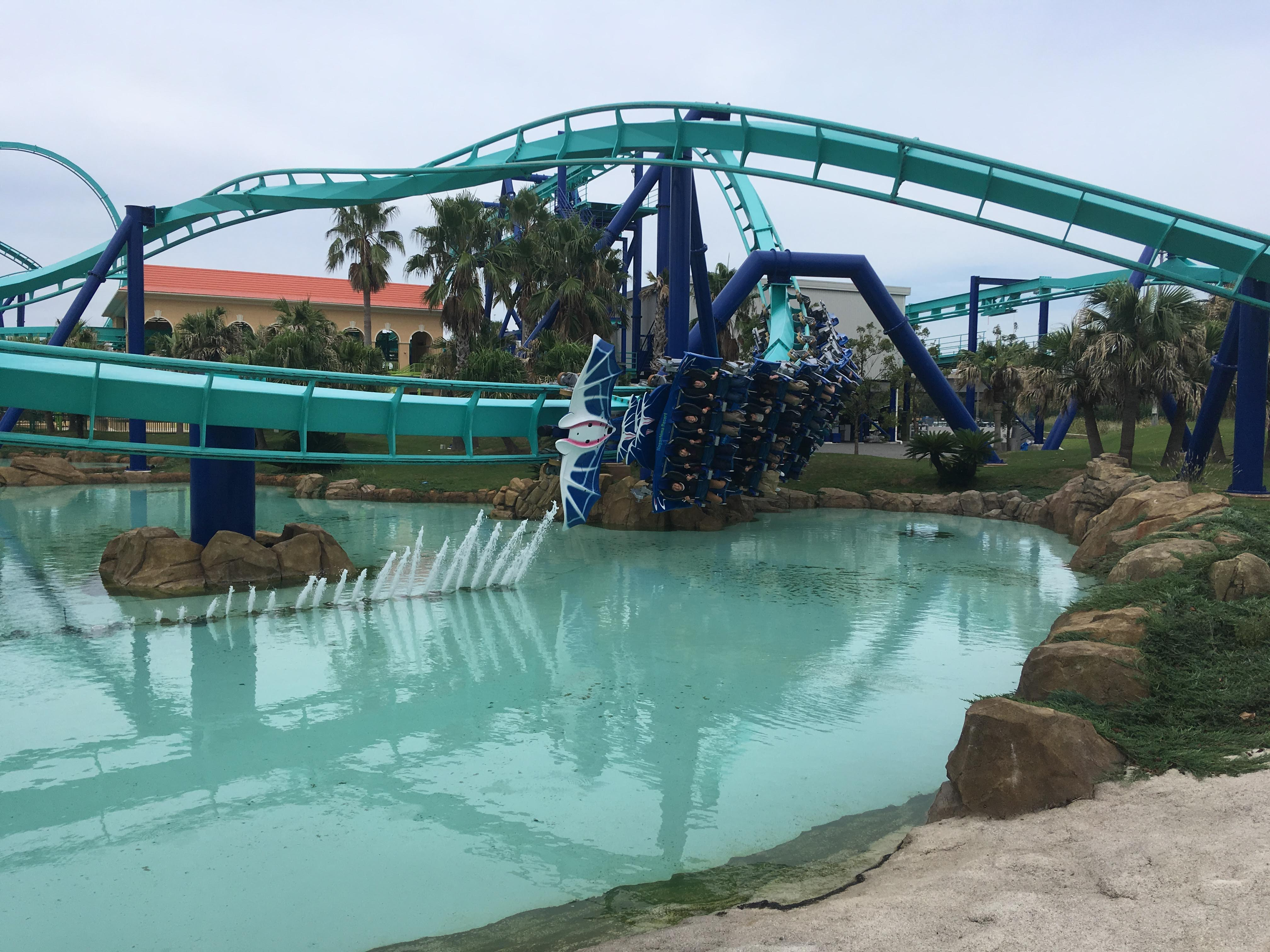
Acrobat beginning to skim the pond

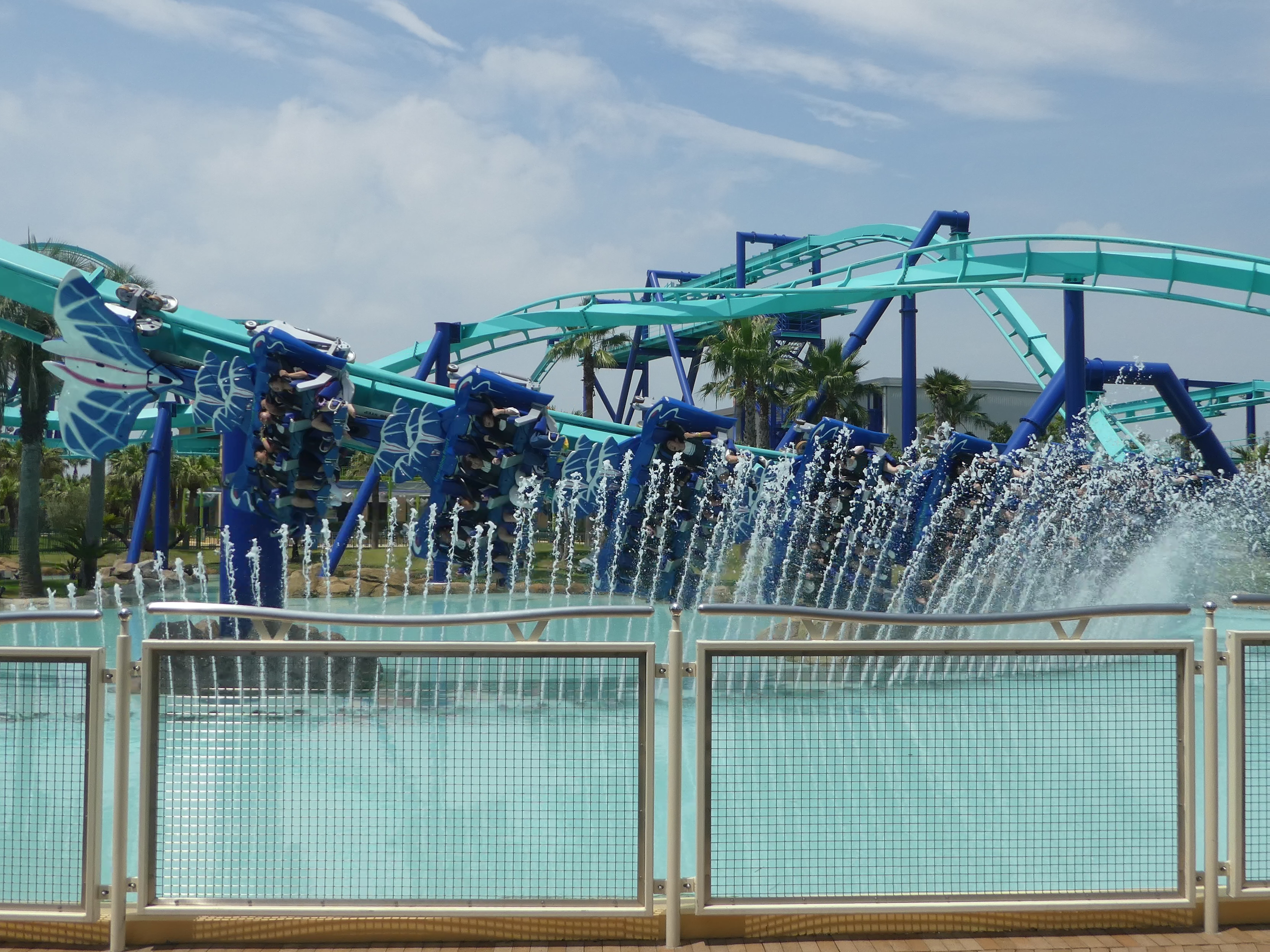
Acrobat in the middle of its pond dive

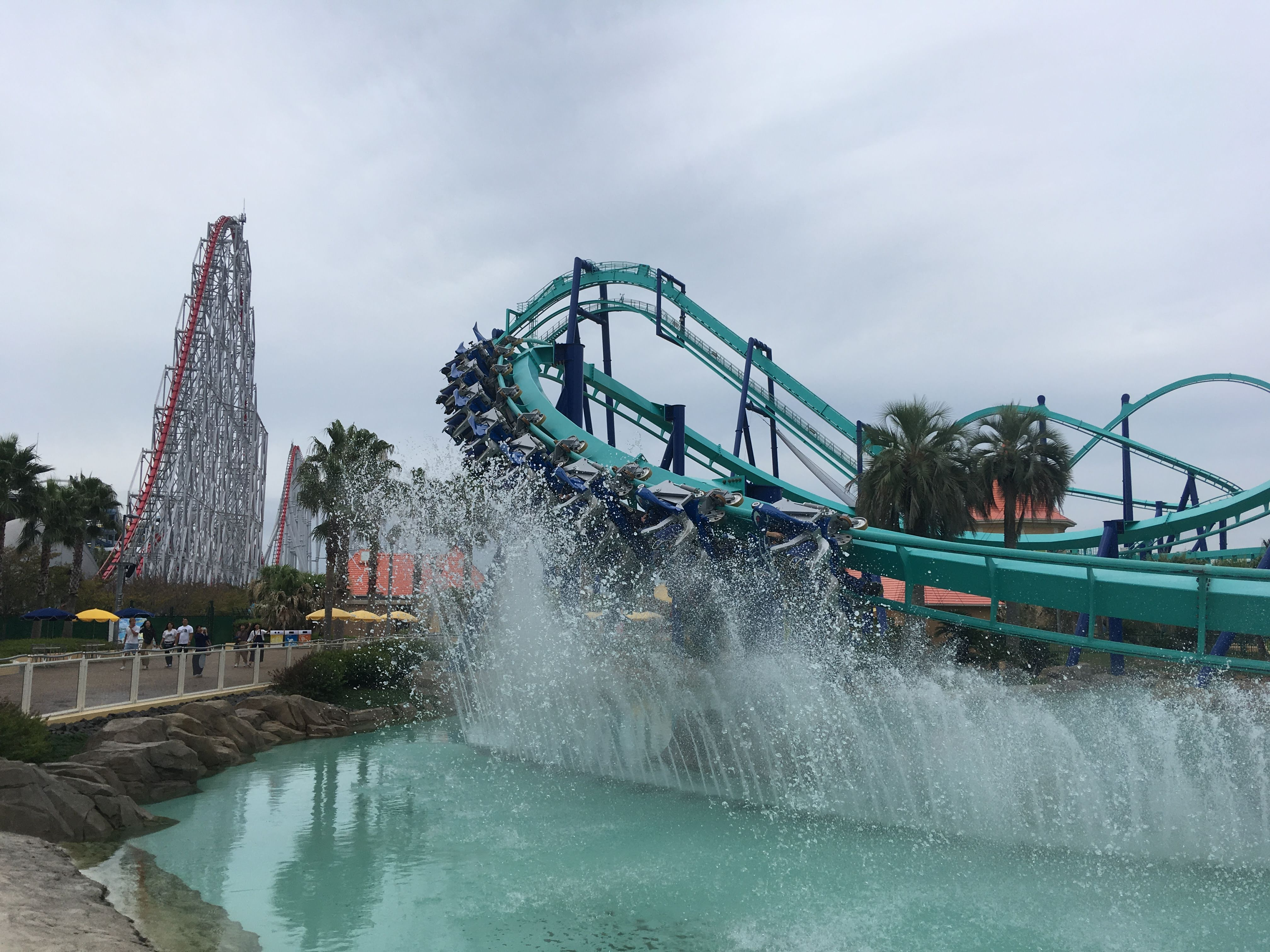
Acrobat exiting the pond dive

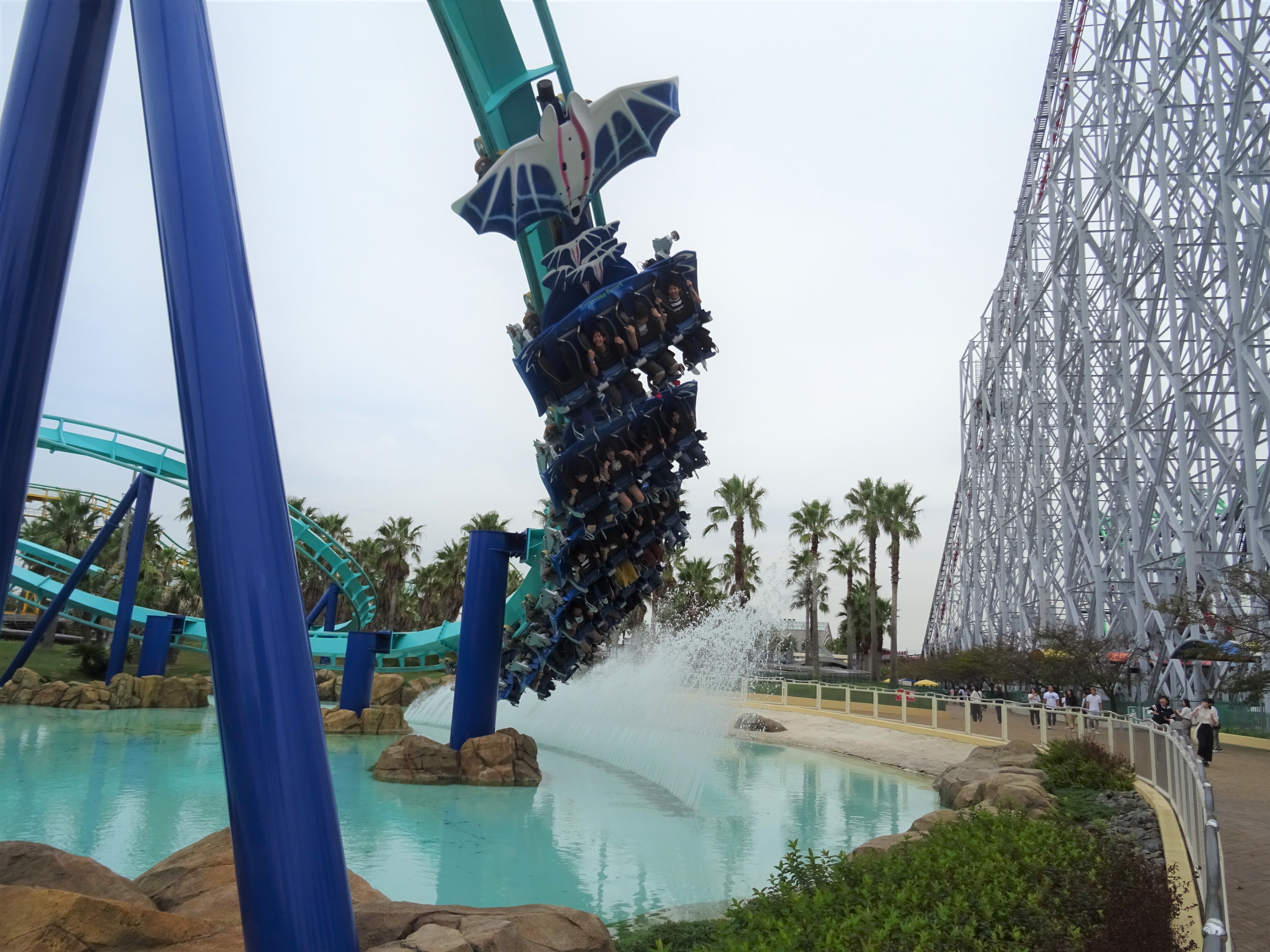
Acrobat rising after the pond dive

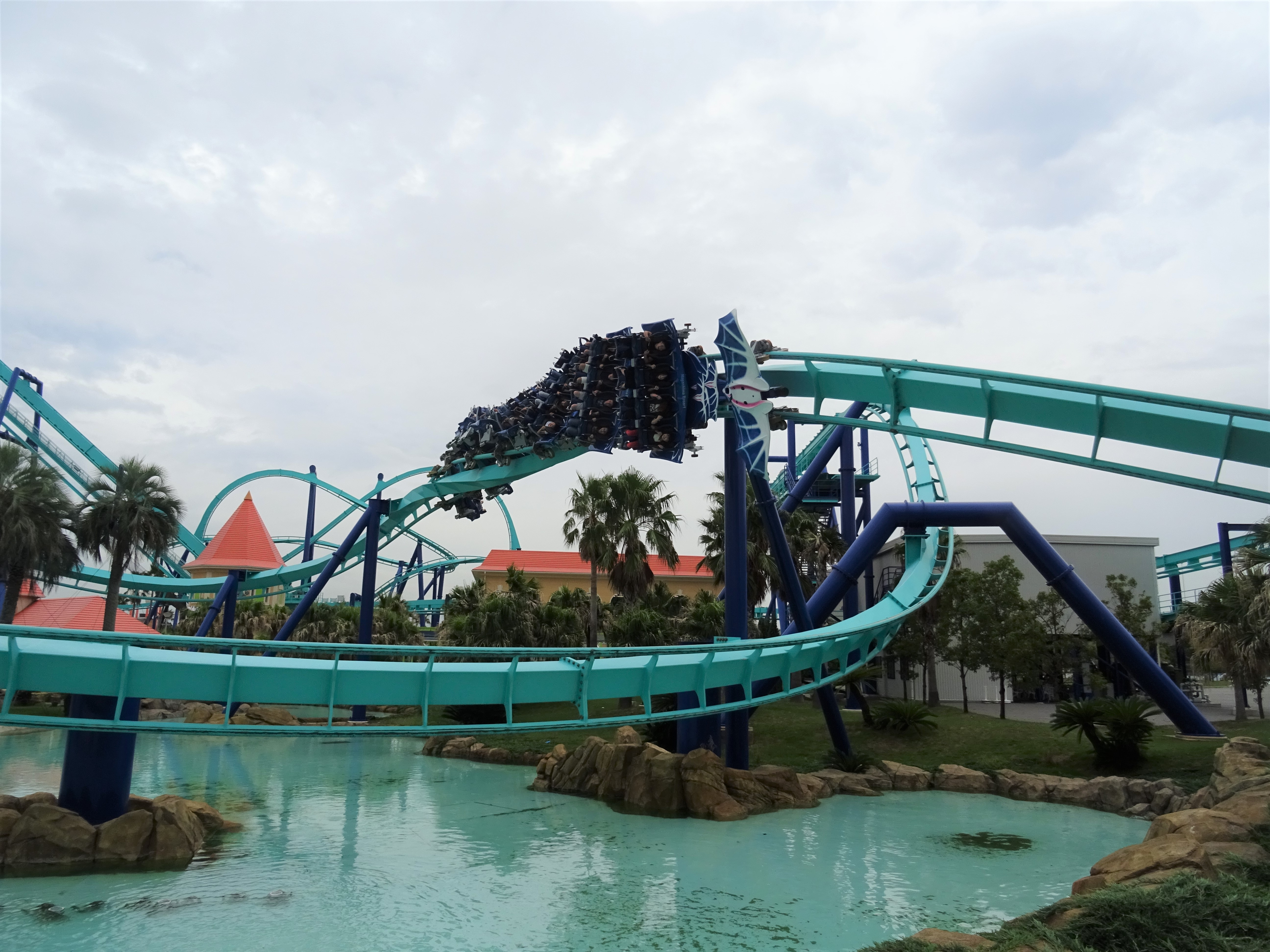
Acrobat going through the final inline twist
