= Tatsu =

Flying roller coaster

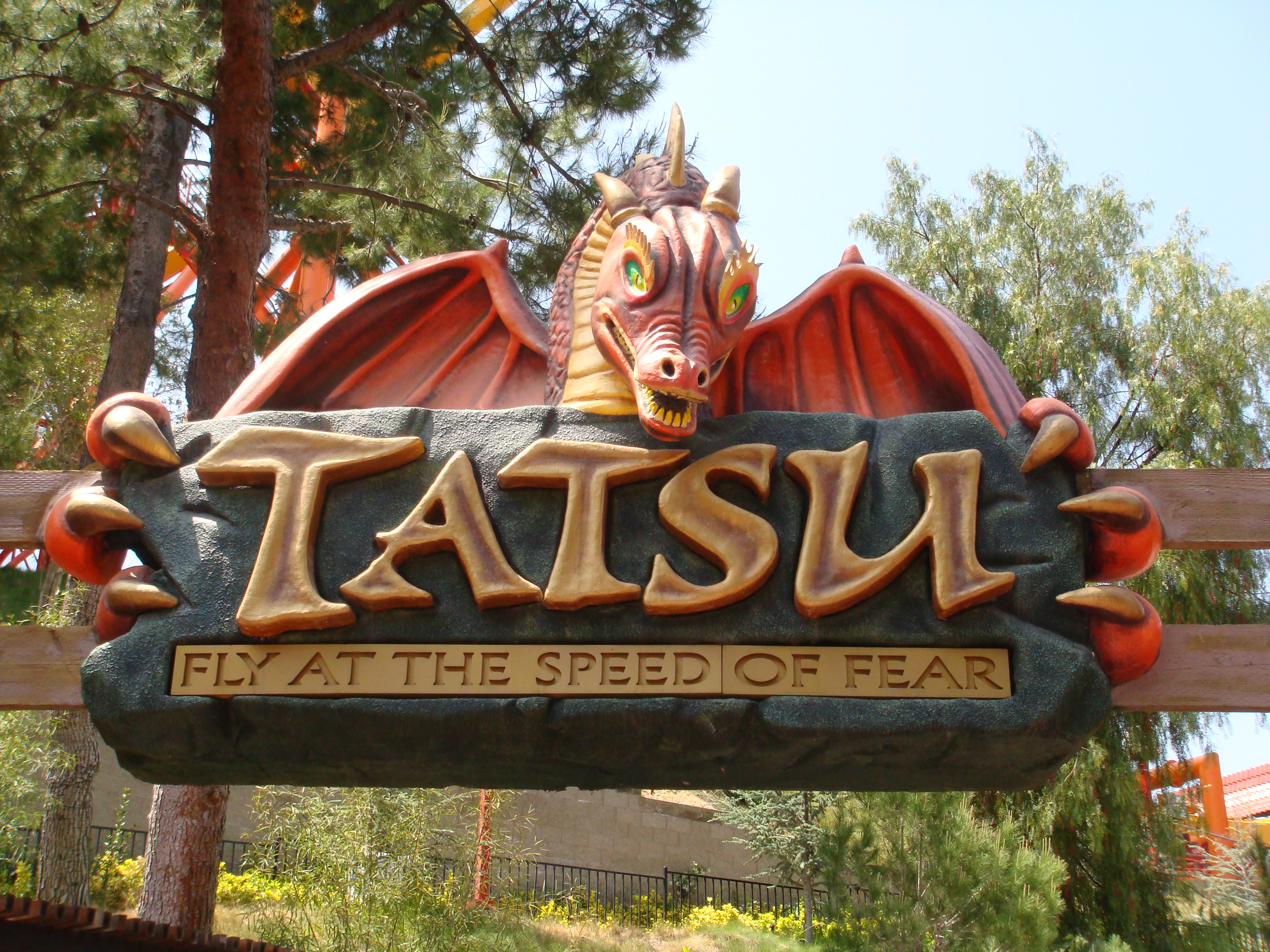

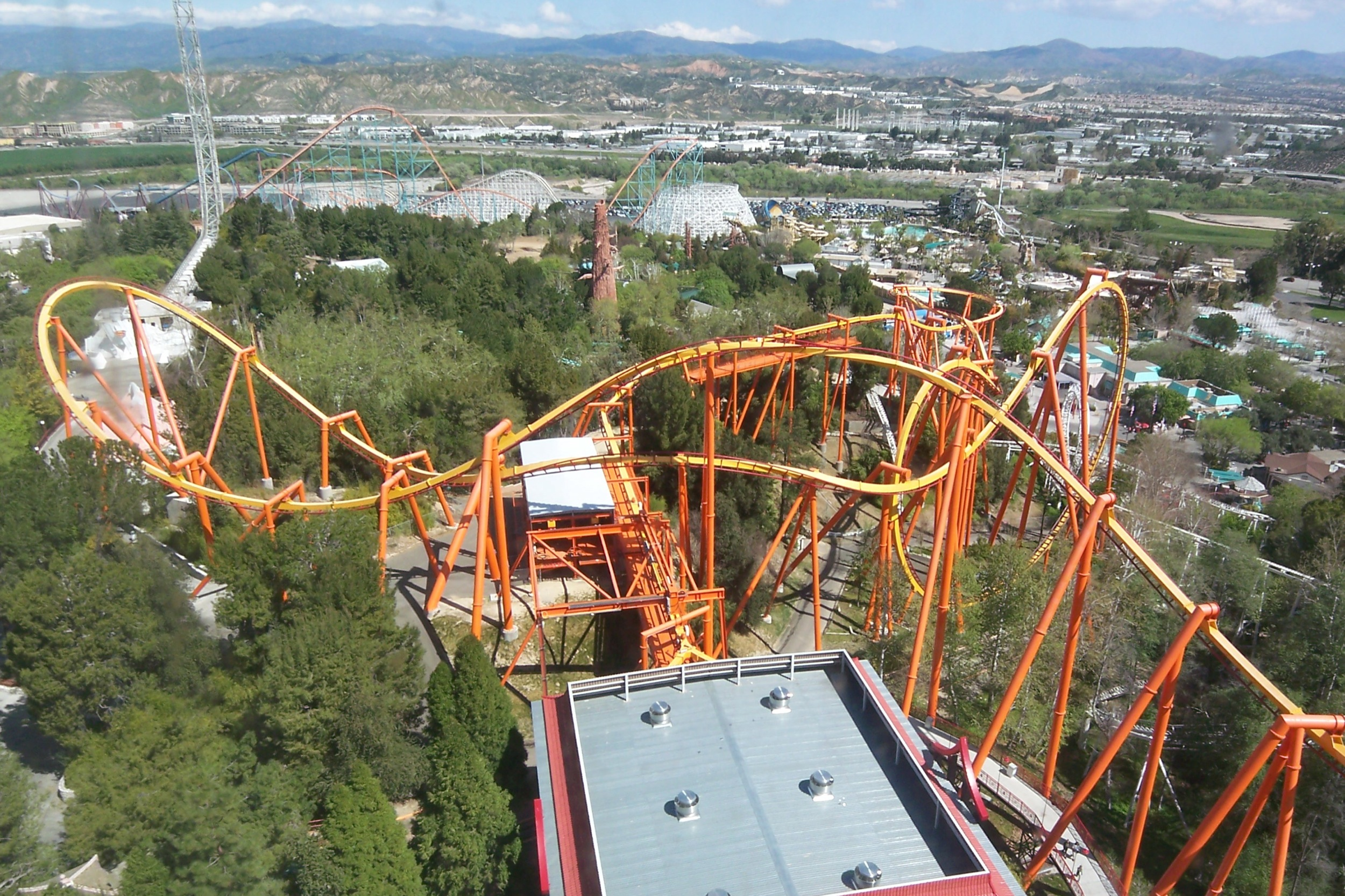
- Tatsu's terrain layout

Six Flags Magic Mountain
- Location: Six Flags Magic Mountain
- Park section: Samurai Summit
- Coordinates: 34°25′19″N 118°35′51″W
- Status: Operating
- Opening date: May 13, 2006
- Cost: $21 million

General statistics
- Type: Steel – Flying
- Manufacturer: Bolliger & Mabillard
- Model: Flying Coaster
- Track layout: Terrain
- Lift/launch system: Chain lift hill
- Height: 170 ft (52 m)
- Drop: 111 ft (34 m)
- Length: 3,602 ft (1,098 m)
- Speed: 62 mph (100 km/h)
- Inversions: 4
- Capacity: 1,600 riders per hour
- Height restriction: 54 in (137 cm)
- Trains: 3 trains with 8 cars; riders arranged 4 across in a single row for a total of 32 riders per train
- Fast Lane available
- Must transfer from wheelchair
- Tatsu at RCDB

Tatsu is a flying roller coaster designed by Bolliger & Mabillard at the Six Flags Magic Mountain amusement park located in Valencia, California, United States. Manufactured by Bolliger & Mabillard, it opened as the tallest, fastest, and longest flying coaster in the world on May 13, 2006. It became the park's seventeenth coaster, featuring a height of 170 feet (52 m), a track length of 3,602 feet (1,098 m), and a maximum speed of 62 mph (100 km/h). Tatsu also features the world's tallest pretzel loop and the only zero-gravity roll inversion on a flying coaster model. Nearly a decade later, The Flying Dinosaur opened at Universal Studios Japan in 2016, breaking Tatsu's length record and matching its speed. In its debut season, Tatsu was ranked 40th among steel coasters in the annual Golden Ticket Awards from Amusement Today, peaking with a rank of 28 in 2012.

== History ==
Land clearing began in mid-2005 around the Samurai Summit area of the park with track for the new roller coaster arriving soon thereafter. Construction permits filed by Six Flags Magic Mountain and a trademark for the name Tatsu (filed on August 23, 2005) were later found by the public. Tatsu was officially announced to the public on November 17, 2005. Both Revolution and Roaring Rapids were temporarily closed in order for the roller coaster to be built. After construction and testing was complete, Tatsu opened to the general public on May 13, 2006.

Tatsu broke several records upon opening, becoming the world's tallest, fastest, and longest flying roller coaster. It held these records until The Flying Dinosaur opened at Universal Studios Japan in 2016, which broke Tatsu's length record and matched the coaster's top speed of 62 mph (100 km/h). Tatsu still remains the tallest, and it also features the tallest pretzel loop in the world, which stands 124 feet (38 m). Its zero-gravity roll is the only one featured on a flying coaster model.

== Ride experience ==
After riders board the train situated in a vertical, standing position, each car then pivots its seats backward 90 degrees, transitioning riders into a horizontal flying position.

The train then dispatches from the station, makes a slight s-bend turn toward the 170-foot (52 m) chain lift hill. After reaching the top, riders descend 111 feet (34 m) through a downward right turn reaching a maximum speed of 62 mph (100 km/h). This is followed by an upward right turn into the first inversion, a 103-foot-tall (31 m) corkscrew. This leads into a downward left turn immediately followed by an upward left turn, and then the train enters a 96-foot (29 m) zero-gravity roll. Riders then experience a sharp drop followed by an 80-foot (24 m) horseshoe element. The train makes a left turn and enters a record-breaking 124-foot (38 m) pretzel loop. This is followed by a slight left turn leading into an inline twist and a 135-degree downward right turn. The train rises back up slightly, leveling out and entering a mid-course brake run. The train makes a left turn and dips slightly, ending at the final brake run.

One cycle of the ride lasts approximately two minutes.

== Characteristics ==
=== Trains ===
Tatsu operates with three steel and fiberglass trains. Each train has eight cars that can seat four riders in a single row for a total of 32 riders per train. Each seat has its own over-the-shoulder-restraint and a pair of ankle restraints to hold the riders' feet in place. The trains are painted green, yellow, orange, and red.

In the station, the trains are oriented in a vertical position in order to allow riders to board. Once the restraints are locked, the train seats are rotated forward 90 degrees into a horizontal position and the train is then dispatched from the station. When the train returns to the station, the seats rotate back down and the riders disembark for the next guests.

=== Track ===
The steel track of Tatsu is 3,602 feet (1,098 m) long and reaches its maximum height on the lift hill at 170 feet (52 m). To slow the train, air brakes are utilized in both brake runs. The track was fabricated by Clermont Steel Fabricators in Batavia, Ohio, which manufactures Bolliger & Mabillard's roller coasters. The coaster opened with red and yellow track with orange supports; it was later repainted to have orange track with green supports.

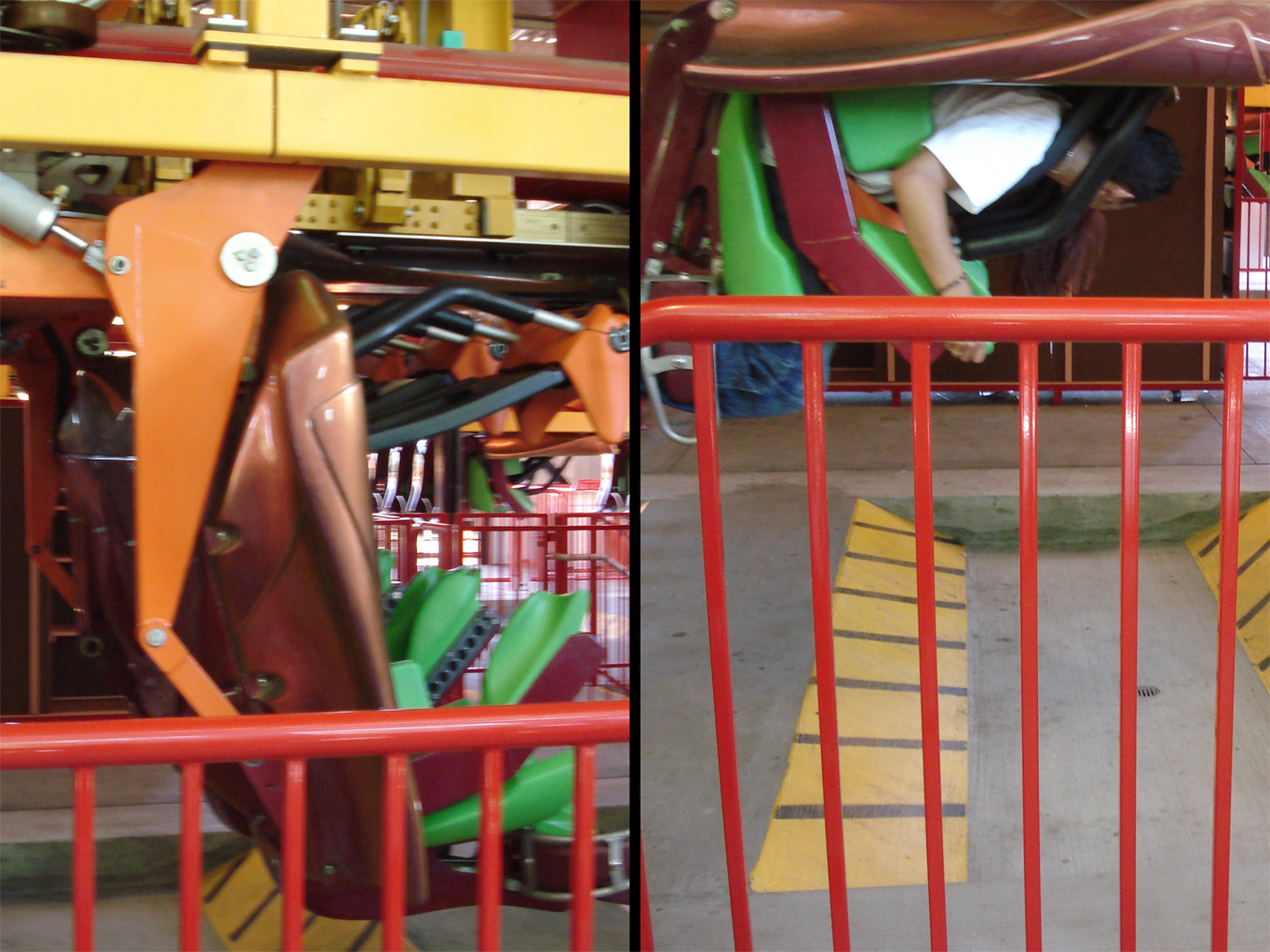
Seats are boarded normally, then rotate 90 degrees into flying position once engaged

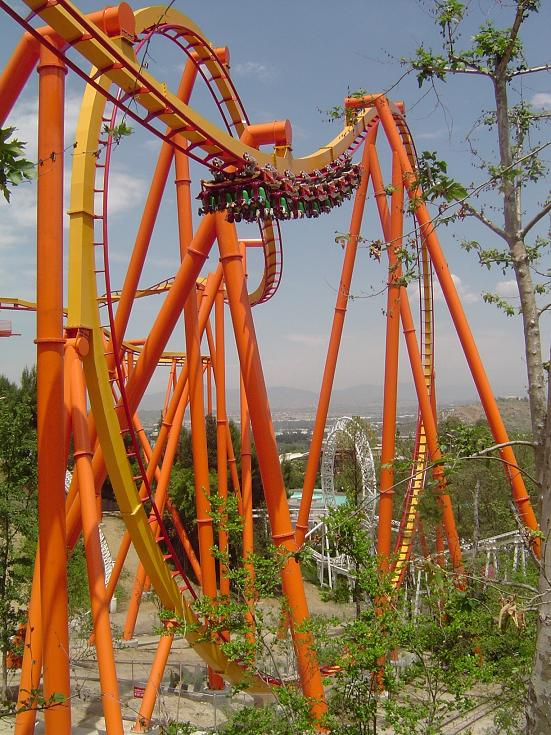
Tatsu's 124-foot-tall pretzel loop

== Reception ==
Joel Bullock from The Coaster Critic rated Tatsu a nine out of ten for its close-to-the-ground approaches and intense pretzel loop at the bottom of the element. Justice from Park Thoughts also rated the roller coaster a nine out of ten, stating, "The lift hill is one of the most suspenseful I have ever experienced." Both praised the ride's g-forces. In 2006, Discovery Channel's Mega Builders aired an episode which followed the construction of Tatsu. The episode showed how the coaster was assembled and the problems construction crews had to overcome.

In Tatsu's opening year, it was named the 40th best steel roller coaster in the world in Amusement Today's Golden Ticket Awards; tied with Talon at Dorney Park. It peaked at 28th place in 2012.

Golden Ticket Awards: Top steel Roller Coasters
Year									1998	1999
Ranking									–	–
Year	2000	2001	2002	2003	2004	2005	2006	2007	2008	2009
Ranking	–	–	–	–	–	–	40	41	36	32
Year	2010	2011	2012	2013	2014	2015	2016	2017	2018	2019
Ranking	40	39	28	50	34	–	–	–	–	49 (tie)
Year	2020	2021	2022	2023	2024	2025	2026			
Ranking	N/A	–	–	–	–	–	–			
