= Mant (disambiguation) =

Mant is a commune in the Landes department in Aquitaine in southwestern France.

Mant may also refer to:

- Mant!, a film within the 1993 film Matinee
- Mant Khas
- Mant Tehsil, in Mathura district of Uttar Pradesh, India
- Mant (Assembly constituency), in Mathura district of Uttar Pradesh, India
- Mantissa Plantarum Altera (abbreviated Mant. Pl. Alt.) 1771 book edited Carl Linnaeus

== People ==
- Mant (surname)

== See also ==
- Pish Mant-e Owl
