= Harpy (Xishuangbanna Theme Park) =

Steel roller coaster in China

Xishuangbanna Theme Park
- Location: Xishuangbanna Theme Park
- Coordinates: 22.027678°N 100.741991°E
- Status: Closed
- Opening date: September 26, 2015
- Closing date: May 2020

General statistics
- Type: Steel – Flying
- Manufacturer: Bolliger & Mabillard
- Model: Flying Coaster
- Lift/launch system: Chain lift hill
- Height: 131.3 ft (40.0 m)
- Length: 2,903.5 ft (885.0 m)
- Speed: 52.8 mph (85.0 km/h)
- Inversions: 2
- Harpy at RCDB

Harpy was a steel roller coaster at Xishuangbanna Theme Park in China. The roller coaster opened to the public on September 26, 2015 and closed in May 2020. The coaster reached a height of 131 feet (40 m) and a speed of 52.8 miles per hour (85.0 km/h).

== Ride experience ==
=== Station and loading ===
Riders first board the train in a similar style to inverted roller coasters. The restraints on this ride are padded vests and a lap bar coming from above. To make the ride more comfortable there are two flaps holding the legs in place during the ride. After the trains is loaded and ready to dispatch, the cars enter the flying position, and the train departs the station.

=== Layout ===
The ride begins with a 90° turn into the chain lift hill. After climbing this lift hill and descending the twisted first drop, riders experience a pretzel loop. The track then turns to the left, passing through the pretzel loop. After turning to the right, riders dip down towards a pond. After another right turn, the track crosses over the final brake run into an inline twist. Finally, the train traverses a helix and a turn before reaching the final brake run.

The ride's 2,903.5-foot (885.0 m) layout features two inversions and reaches a height of 131 feet (40 m) and a speed of 52.8 miles per hour (85.0 km/h).
