= Flying roller coaster =

Type of roller coaster

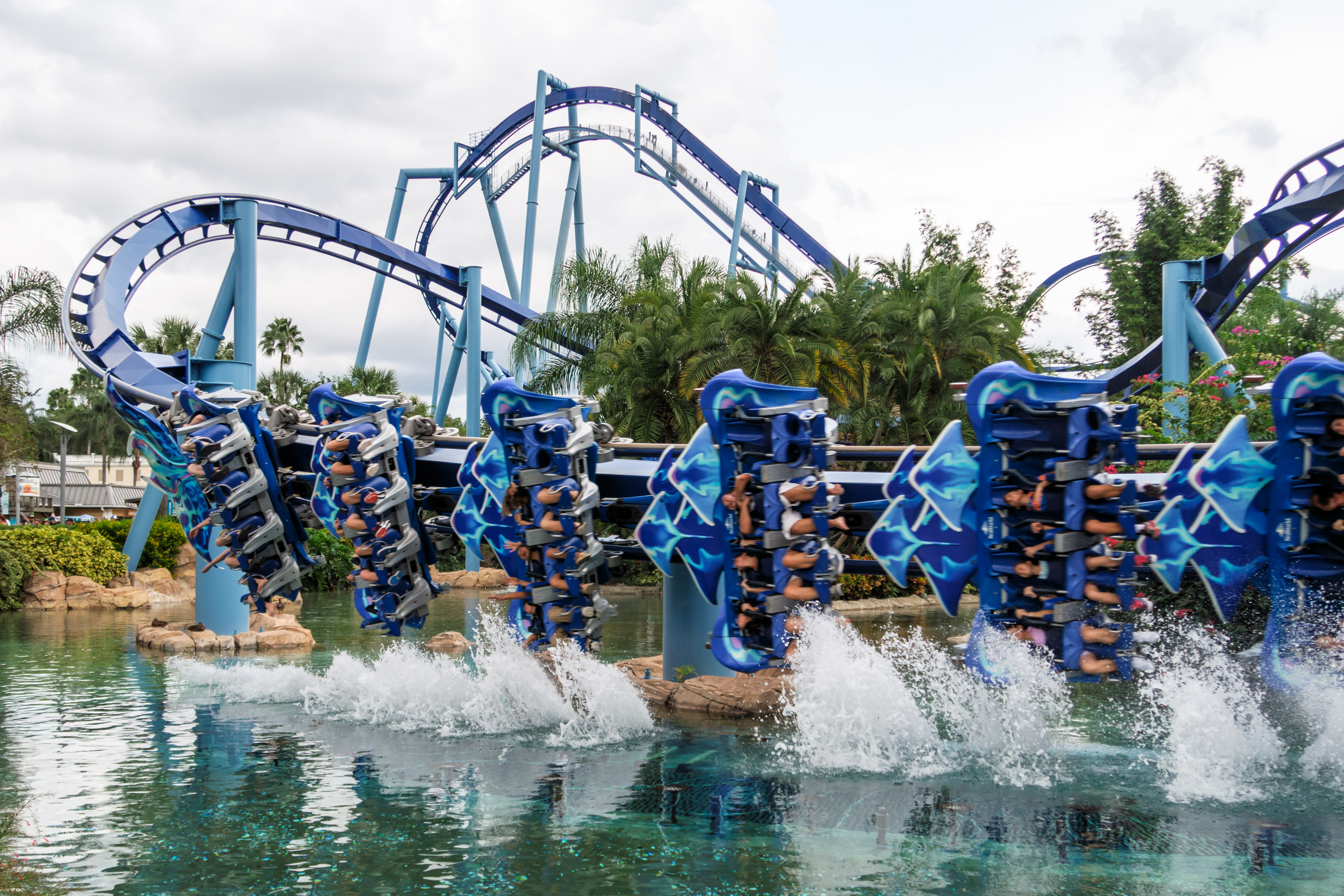
- Manta, a flying coaster at SeaWorld Orlando
- Status: In production
- First manufactured: 1997
- No. of installations: 26
- Manufacturers: Bolliger & Mabillard; Vekoma; Zamperla
- Restraint Style: Over-the-shoulder (most common style)

A flying roller coaster is a type of steel roller coaster meant to simulate the sensations of flight by harnessing riders in a prone position during the duration of the ride. The roller coaster cars are suspended below the track, with riders secured such that their backs are parallel to the track.

== History ==
The flying roller coaster is a relatively new concept. The world's first flying roller coaster was Skytrak, built in Manchester, United Kingdom at the Granada Studios Tour in 1997. The Skytrak used a single-passenger car. Riders would climb into the car in much the same fashion as climbing a ladder, then the car would be raised up to the track before being dispatched. The single-passenger design kept the ride's capacity low, at only 240 riders per hour. The park, and Skytrak itself, were short-lived; both closed in 1998.

== Design ==
=== Vekoma ===
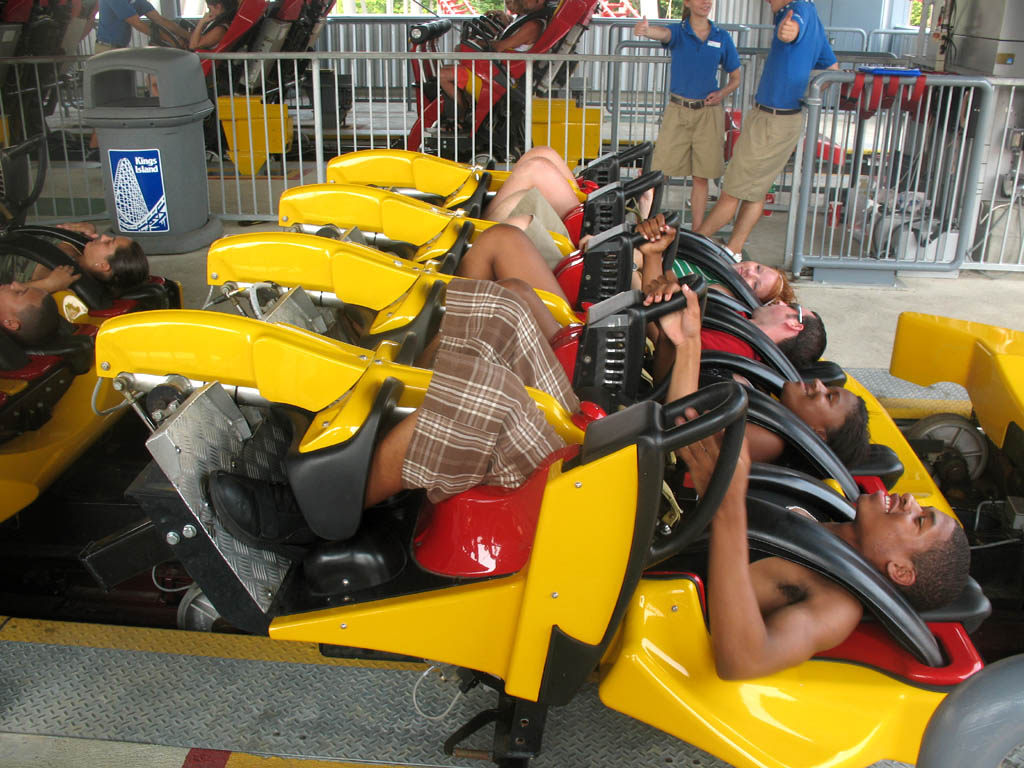
Coaster train on the now-defunct Firehawk at Kings Island in reclined position prior to leaving station. The train's direction of travel is to the right.

Dutch roller coaster manufacturer Vekoma constructed the first large-scale flying roller coaster, Stealth, for California's Great America in 2000. Nicknamed the 'Flying Dutchman' by Vekoma, Stealth featured a higher-capacity train with four-across seating. Riders load the trains in an upright sitting position, facing the rear of the train. After the train is fully loaded, a mechanism in the station lower the seats to the track, with the riders on their backs facing the ceiling. After cresting the lift hill, the track twists 180 degrees to flip the riders into the flying position for the rest of the ride. Just prior to reaching the roller coaster's final brake run, the track twists again, such that riders are lying on their backs facing upward. After reaching the station, the seats are raised back to loading position.

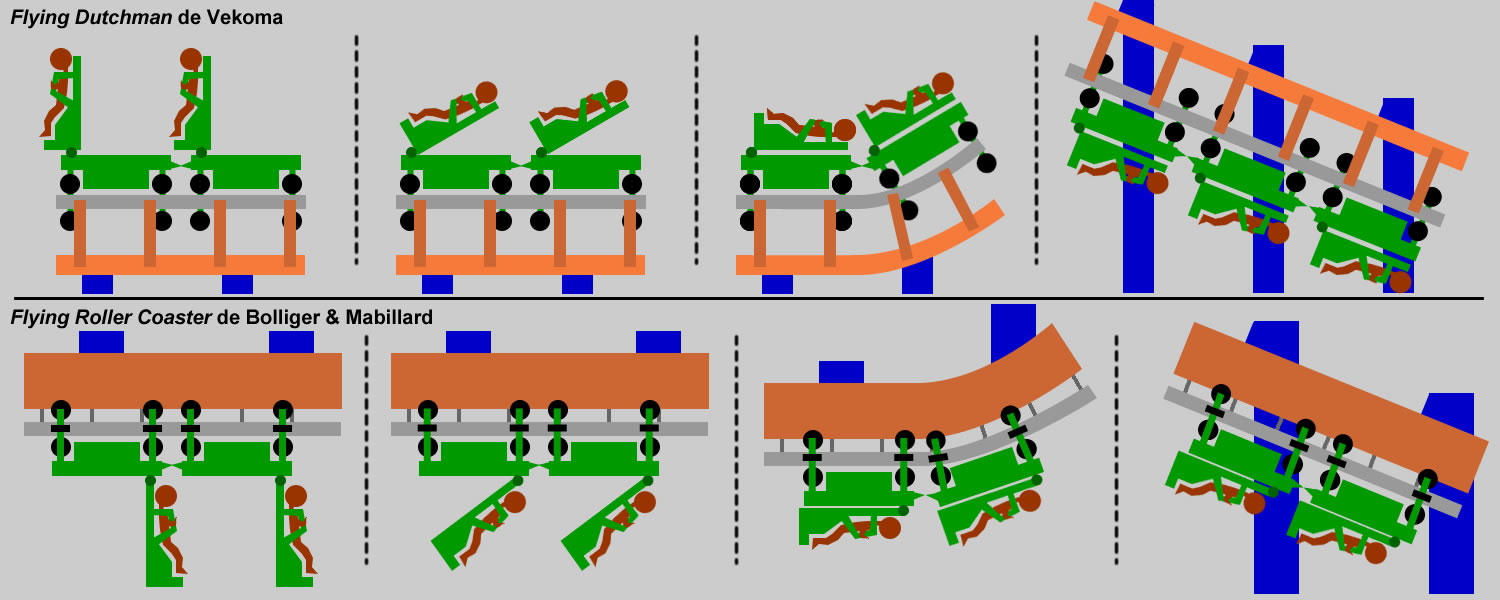
Diagram showing the difference between a Vekoma Flying Dutchman and Bolliger & Mabillard Flying roller coaster

The harness system for the Vekoma flying roller coaster consists of two main elements: the lap bar and the chest harness. After being seated, the operator pulls down the lap bar, which is hinged on the floor of the train. The bar locks into slots in the sides of the seat and secures the waist. Halfway up the bar is a pair of leg restraints, which hold the legs in place during the ride. The rider then fastens the buckles to close the chest harness and secure the upper body. Hand grips are placed at the ends of the arm rests of each seat.

Vekoma expanded upon the 'Flying Dutchman' prototype with two other installations in 2001, Batwing for Six Flags America and X-Flight for Geauga Lake. All three Vekoma Flying Dutchmans are no longer operating, following Batwing's closure in 2025. Stealth was relocated to Carowinds where it operated as BORG Assimilator from 2004 to 2007, and later as Nighthawk until its closure in 2024, while X-Flight operated at Kings Island as Firehawk until its closure on October 28, 2018. Vekoma's flying roller coasters had a 54-inch minimum-height requirement.

In 2009, Vekoma debuted a new, more compact flying roller coaster model nicknamed the 'Stingray', which used the same seating configuration as the original Flying Dutchman but with Vekoma's new track style as well as a vertical lift hill. Its first installation was at the Suzhou Giant Wheel Park in Suzhou, China, which opened on August 18, 2009. The ride was removed in 2018.

In 2014, Phantasialand in Brühl, Germany contracted Vekoma, to design and build a new flying roller coaster to be the center piece of a new immersive themed area of the park which would also include the park's third hotel. Noting previous design limitations and issues with other flying coaster models, particularly in regard to capacity as loading procedures were slow and complex. Phantasialand pursued two objectives for the design of their new flying coaster; a simplified and streamlined loading process, and custom layout designed to fit in the limited space (100m by 75m) available as well as height restrictions imposed upon the park. Vekoma spent the next few years designing and testing a prototype system at its factory in Vlodrop, with construction on the new coaster beginning in 2016 and finishing in 2019. In 2019, Phantasialand began a teaser campaign for the new coaster, announcing the name F.L.Y. (Flying Launch Coaster). On September 17, 2020, F.L.Y. officially opened to the public.

F.L.Y. features a completely brand new loading procedure never before seen on any flying coaster model. Upon entering the station, the track and trains rotate from a prone position 90 degrees onto the side, while the seats, which are two abreast, rotate at the same time so that the passengers move from a prone "flying" position to an upright position. The passengers load into a standard seated position and pull down the over-the-shoulder vest harness. Once secure, the train is dispatched out of the station and proceeds in the upright position through a short dark ride section before the track, train, and seats rotate into the prone flying position.

In addition to the new loading procedure, F.L.Y. is also the first flying roller coaster to utilize a launch system rather than a lift system. F.L.Y. features two separate LSM launches that launches trains up to a top speed of 48.5 mph (78.1 km/h) over 4,055.1 feet (1,236.0 m) of track making it the world's longest flying coaster.

Since opening, F.L.Y. has been met with positive reception for its innovative design, riding experience, operations, capacity, and theming that have won the coaster several industry awards.

=== Bolliger & Mabillard ===
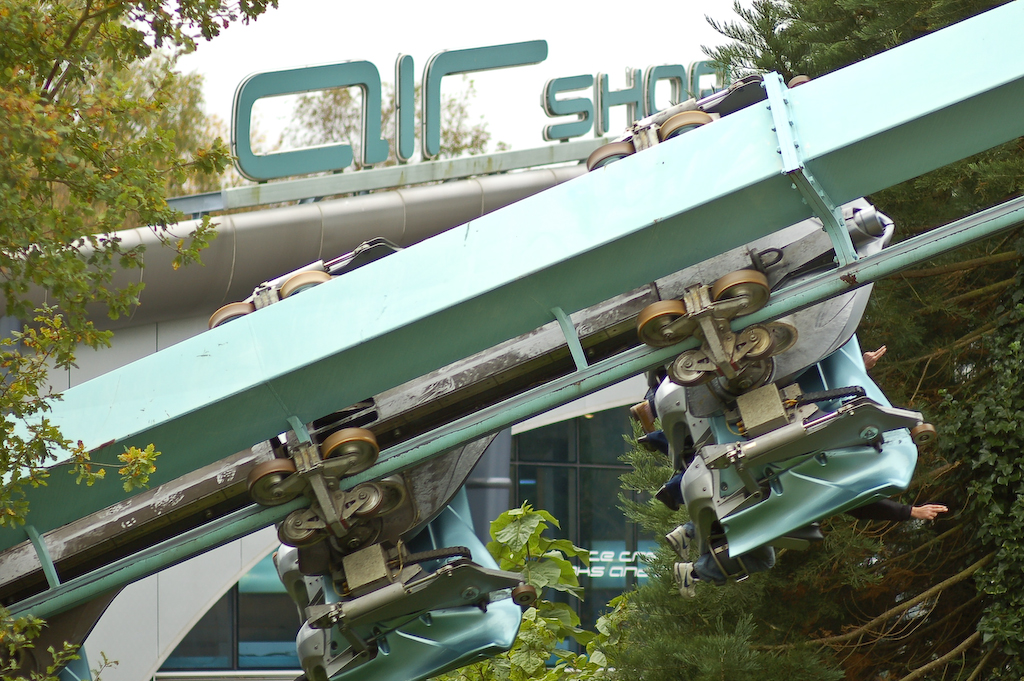
Galactica (Air from 2002 to 2015) at Alton Towers, Bolliger & Mabillard's first flying coaster

Swiss roller coaster manufacturer B&M debuted their flying coaster model Air (since renamed Galactica) at Alton Towers in 2002, jointly developed with ride designer John Wardley. Riders take a seating position like on a regular inverted coaster with a chest harness and leglocks. They are then tilted 90° so they assume a frontwards lying position. In total, B&M built 11 flying coasters. Air was followed by three installations of Superman: Ultimate Flight at different Six Flags parks over the next year, with a fourth Six Flags coaster added in 2006 with the construction of Tatsu at Six Flags Magic Mountain. The final American instilation came in 2009, with Manta at SeaWorld Orlando. The remaining five were installed in Asia: three in China (Crystal Wing, Starry Sky Ripper, and Harpy) and two in Japan (Acrobat and The Flying Dinosaur).

=== Zamperla ===
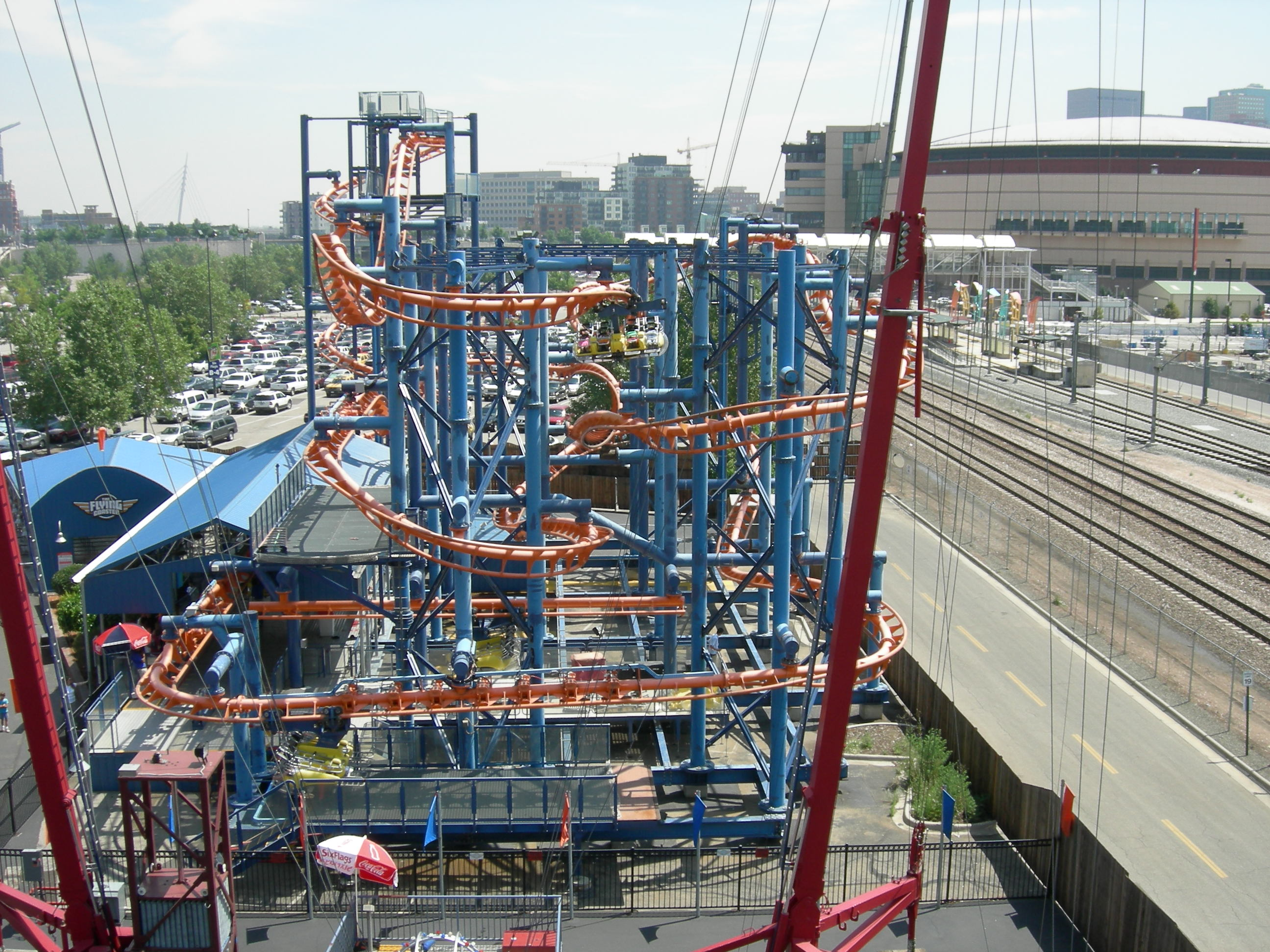
A Zamperla flying coaster, Soarin' Eagle, when it operated as Flying Coaster at Elitch Gardens

Italian design manufacturer Zamperla produces a flying roller coaster model dubbed 'Volare' (Italian for "to fly"). Riders lie down in the cars, which hang from an upper rail at a 45-degree angle. The car is then lifted up into a flying position while holding the riders inside. This model is very compact and affordable (estimated to be US$6 million) and comes with a unique spiral lift hill in which a tall spinning column with two vertical poles connected to it push the cars up the spiral track. The minimum rider height requirement is 50 inches (127 cm).

The first Volare debuted as a prototype in 2002 as Flying Coaster at Elitch Gardens, where it operated until 2007. It faced numerous technical issues that were corrected on subsequent models produced by Zamperla. After closing, Flying Coaster was returned to Zamperla, where it was refurbished and installed at Coney Island as Soarin' Eagle.

Notably, the Volare model is often not met with particularly positive reviews. Roller coaster enthusiasts often describe the model as uncomfortable or rough due to the 'claustrophobic' cage-like nature of the restraint system.

== Installations ==
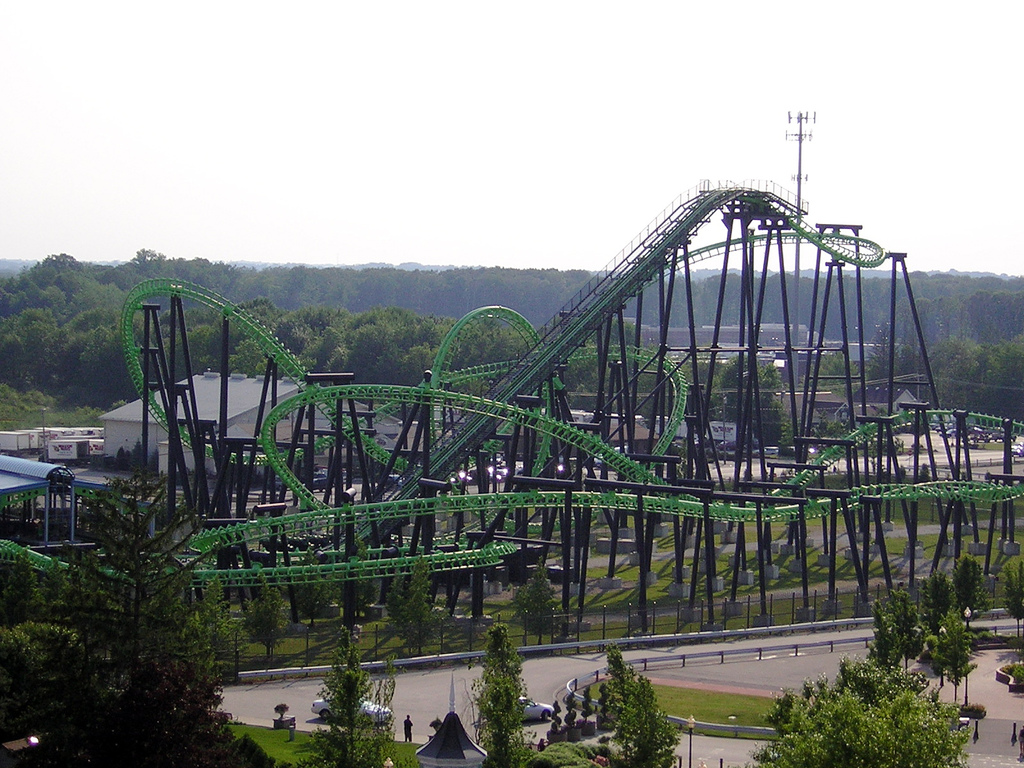
A former Vekoma flying roller coaster, X-Flight formerly at Geauga Lake

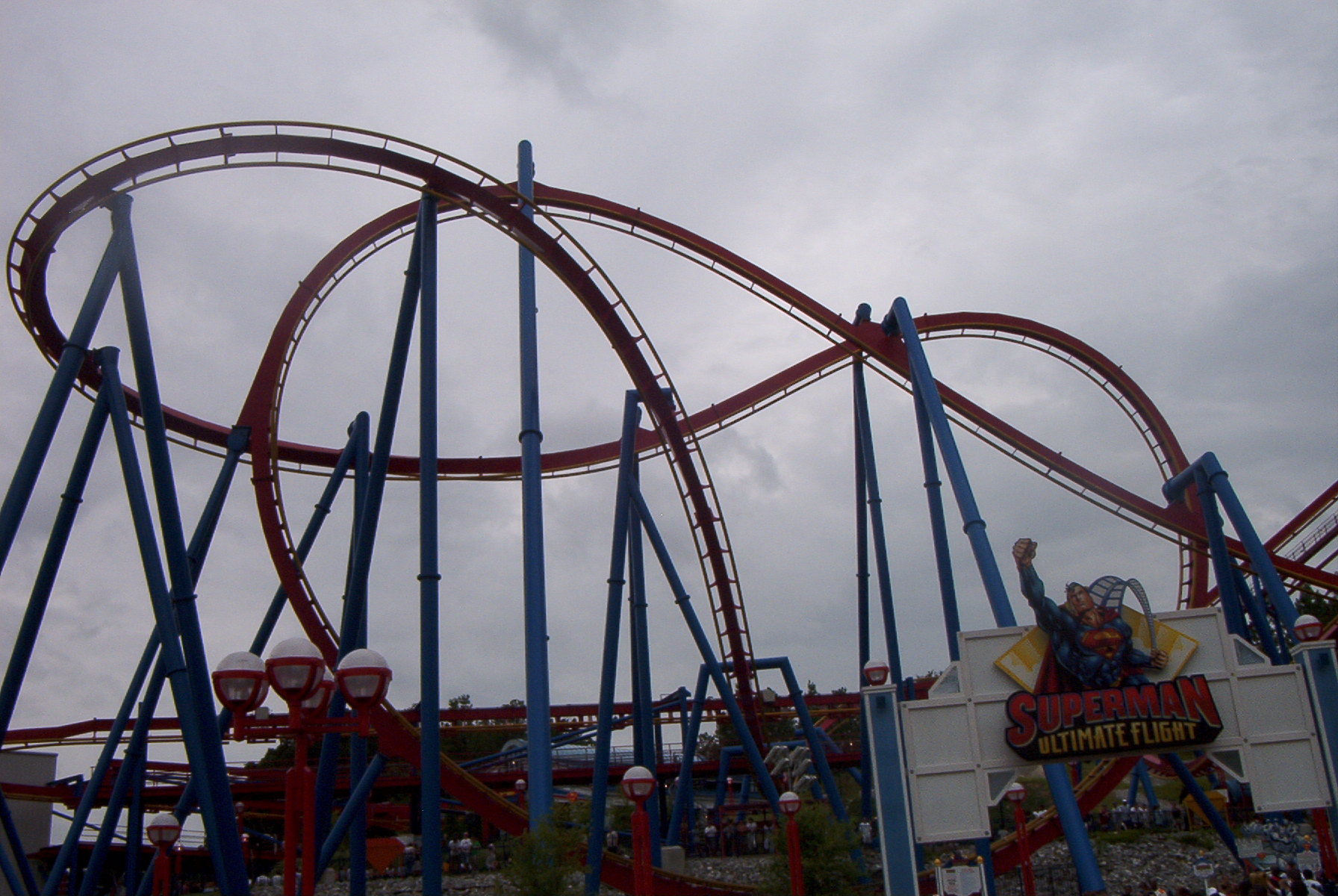
A Bolliger & Mabillard roller coaster, Superman: Ultimate Flight at Six Flags Over Georgia

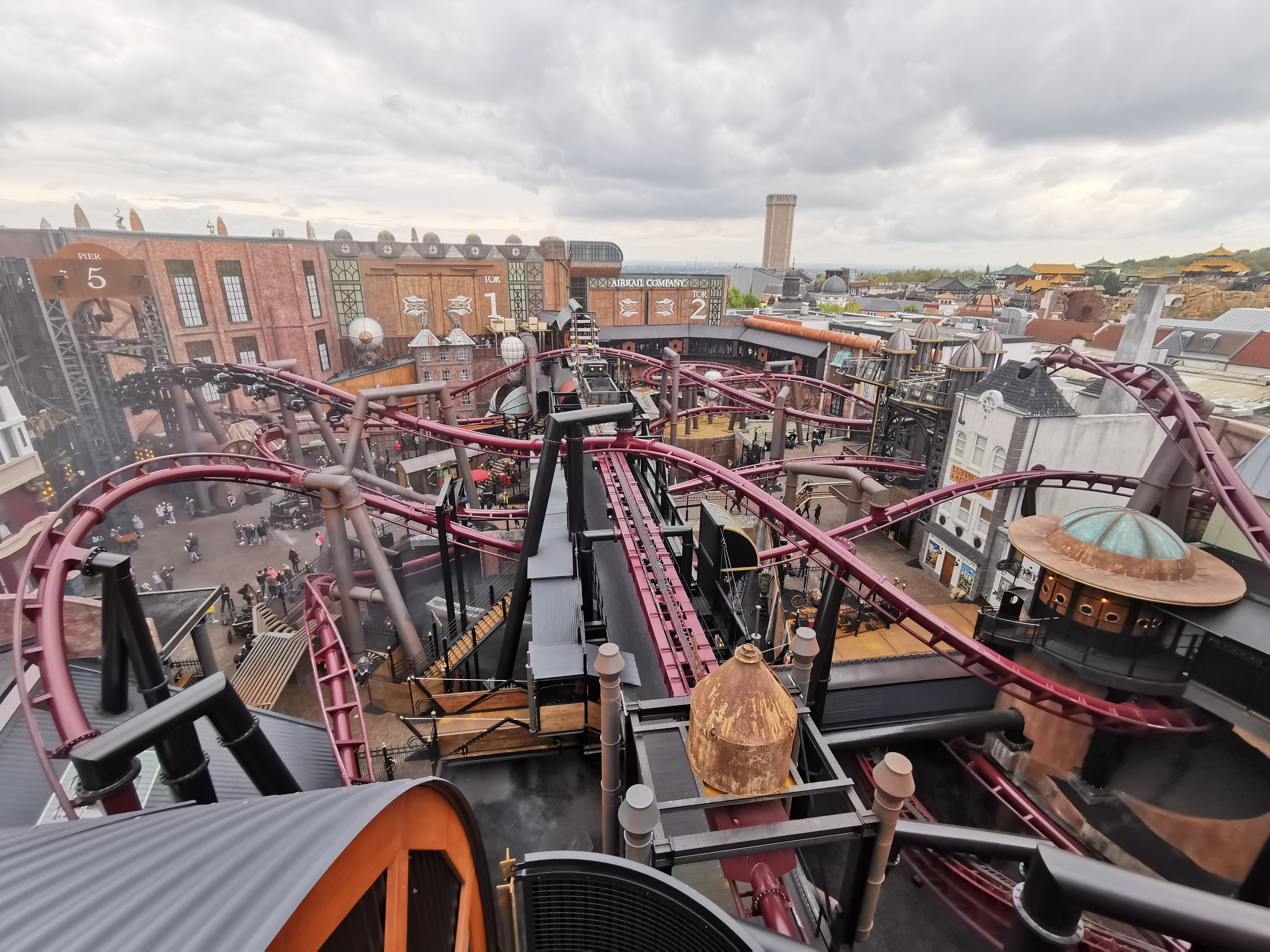
A Vekoma launched flying roller coaster, F.L.Y. at Phantasialand

Name	Park	Manufacturer	Opened	Status	Ref(s)
Skytrak	Granada Studios	Skytrak International	1997	Removed	
Komet	Encounter Zone	Select Contracts	1998	Removed	
Batwing	Six Flags America	Vekoma	2001	SBNO	
Galactica; Formerly Air	Alton Towers	Bolliger & Mabillard	2002	Operating	
Superman: Ultimate Flight	Six Flags Over Georgia	Bolliger & Mabillard	2002	Operating	
Superman: Ultimate Flight	Six Flags Great Adventure	Bolliger & Mabillard	2003	Operating	
Superman: Ultimate Flight	Six Flags Great America	Bolliger & Mabillard	2003	Operating	
Hexenbesen	Erlebniswelt Seilbahnen Thale	Wiegand	2003	Operating	
Nighthawk; Formerly BORG Assimilator; Formerly Stealth	Carowinds; California's Great America	Vekoma	2004; 2000	Removed; Closed 2003	
Super Flight	Playland	Zamperla	2004	Removed	
Time Warp	Canada's Wonderland	Zamperla	2004	Removed	
Volare	Wiener Prater	Zamperla	2004	Operating	
Trombi	Särkänniemi	Zamperla	2005	Closed 2023 and Removed 2024	
Tatsu	Six Flags Magic Mountain	Bolliger & Mabillard	2006	Operating	
Crystal Wing	Happy Valley Beijing	Bolliger & Mabillard	2006	Operating	
Firehawk; Formerly X-Flight	Kings Island; Geauga Lake	Vekoma	2007; 2001	Removed; Closed 2006	
Manta	SeaWorld Orlando	Bolliger & Mabillard	2009	Operating	
Stingray	Suzhou Giant Wheel Park	Vekoma	2009	Removed	
Inertia Airplane Car	Kaeson Youth Park	Zamperla	2010	Operating	
Sky Scrapper	World Joyland	Bolliger & Mabillard	2011	Operating	
Soarin' Eagle; Formerly Flying Coaster	Luna Park, Coney Island; Elitch Gardens	Zamperla	2011; 2002	Operating; Closed 2003	
Hero	Flamingo Land Resort	Zamperla	2013	Operating	
Acrobat	Nagashima Spa Land	Bolliger & Mabillard	2015	Operating	
Harpy	Xishuangbanna Theme Park	Bolliger & Mabillard	2015	SBNO	
The Flying Dinosaur	Universal Studios Japan	Bolliger & Mabillard	2016	Operating	
Super Glider; Formerly Flying Coaster	Skytropolis Funland; Genting Theme Park	Zamperla	2019; 2004	Operating; Closed 2013	
Volare Hiz Kizagi	Wonderland Eurasia	Zamperla	2019	SBNO	
F.L.Y.	Phantasialand	Vekoma	2020	Operating	
Aurora Flying Coaster	Silk Road Paradise	Jinma Rides	2023	Operating	
