= Crystal Wing =

Roller coaster at Happy Valley Beijing

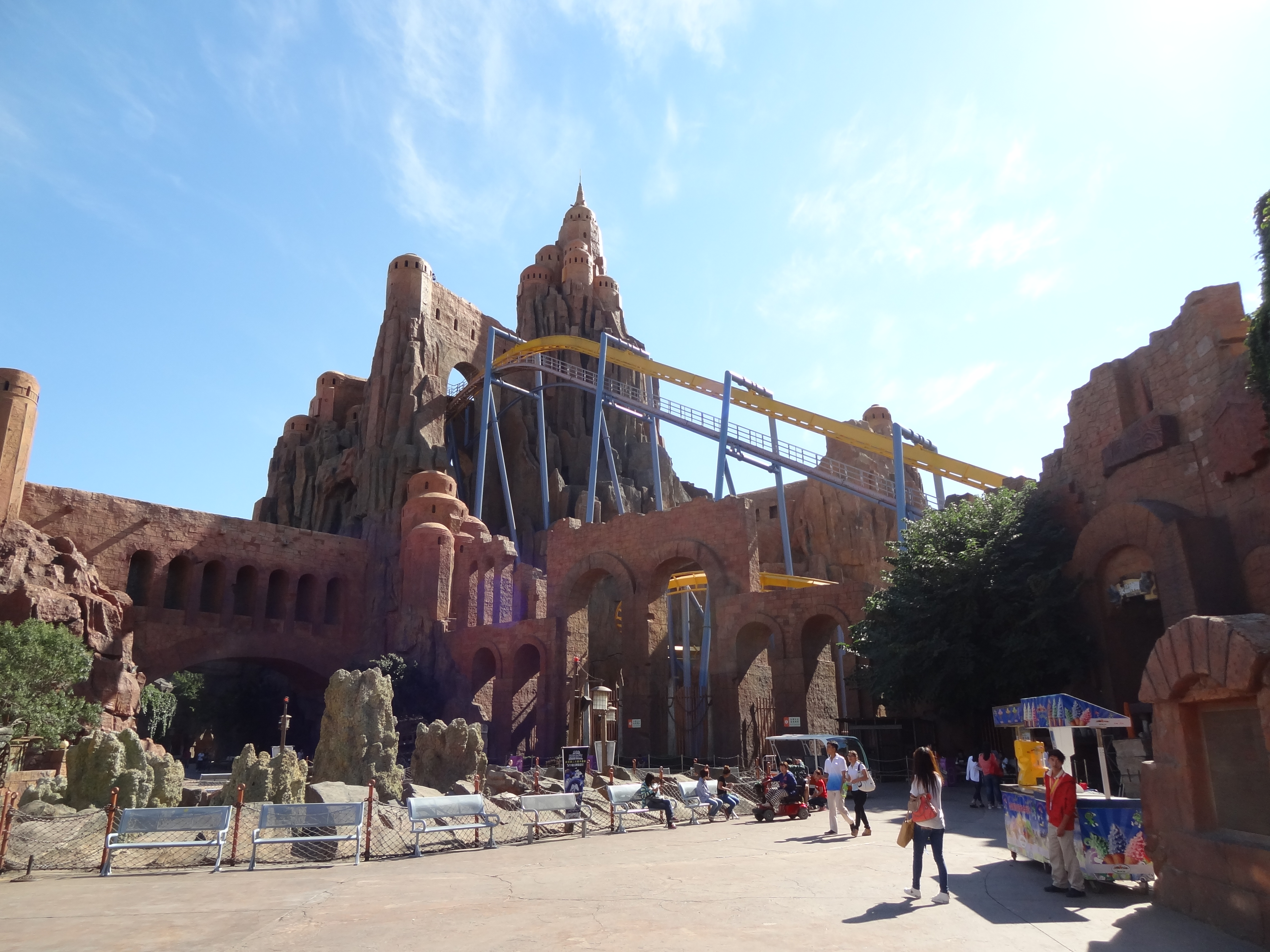

Happy Valley Beijing
- Location: Happy Valley Beijing
- Park section: Atlantis
- Coordinates: 39.865965°N 116.488461°E
- Status: Operating
- Opening date: July 9, 2006

General statistics
- Type: Steel – Flying
- Manufacturer: Bolliger & Mabillard
- Model: Flying Coaster
- Lift/launch system: Chain lift hill
- Height: 106 ft (32 m)
- Drop: 100 ft (30 m)
- Length: 2,798 ft (853 m)
- Speed: 51 mph (82 km/h)
- Inversions: 2
- Crystal Wing at RCDB

Crystal Wing (Chinese: 水晶之翼) is a flying roller coaster at Happy Valley in Beijing, China. The ride opened on 9 July 2006. The layout of this coaster is identical to the Superman: Ultimate Flight flying roller coasters designed by Bolliger & Mabillard located at several Six Flags parks. However, unlike the Superman coasters at several Six Flags parks, it goes through mountain scenery instead of an open space.

== Ride experience ==
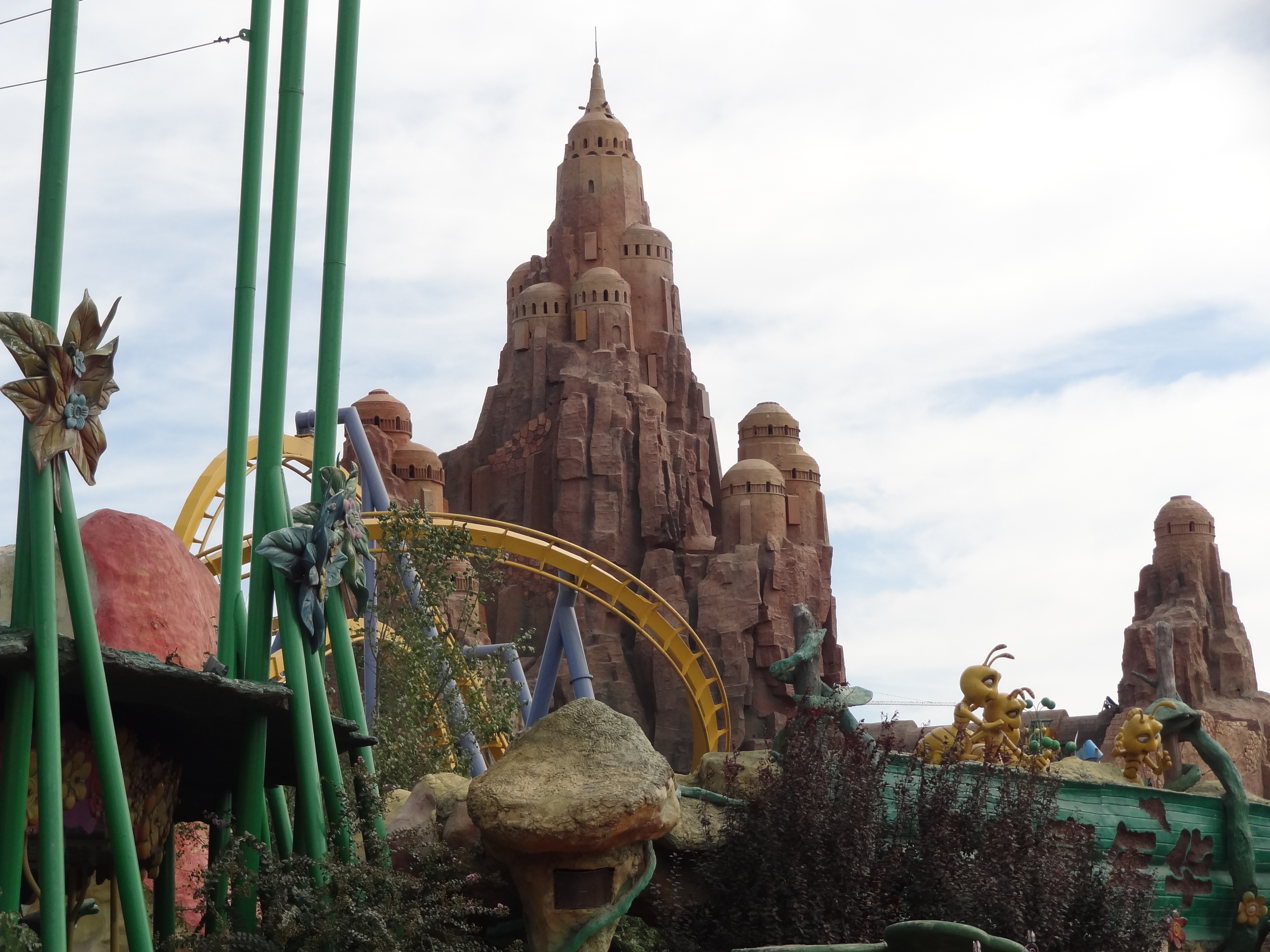
Crystal Wing pretzel loop and theming

=== Theme ===
The ride is themed around the "Crystal City", which was a sacred place in Atlantis, the location of this ride. Rockwork is present around the coaster to tie into the theme.

=== Layout ===
Riders start by being raised into the flying position in the station, before going into a right-hand turn onto the lift hill. After the 32-metre-tall (105 ft) lift, riders traverse a small straight drop before going into a curved drop to the right. After the drop, riders rise into a pretzel loop element and a left-hand dropping turn before a right-hand rising turn. Then, it goes through a series of left- and right-hand turns before a 270-degree helix and an inline twist into the brakes.
