= Soarin' Eagle =

Steel roller coaster in New York City

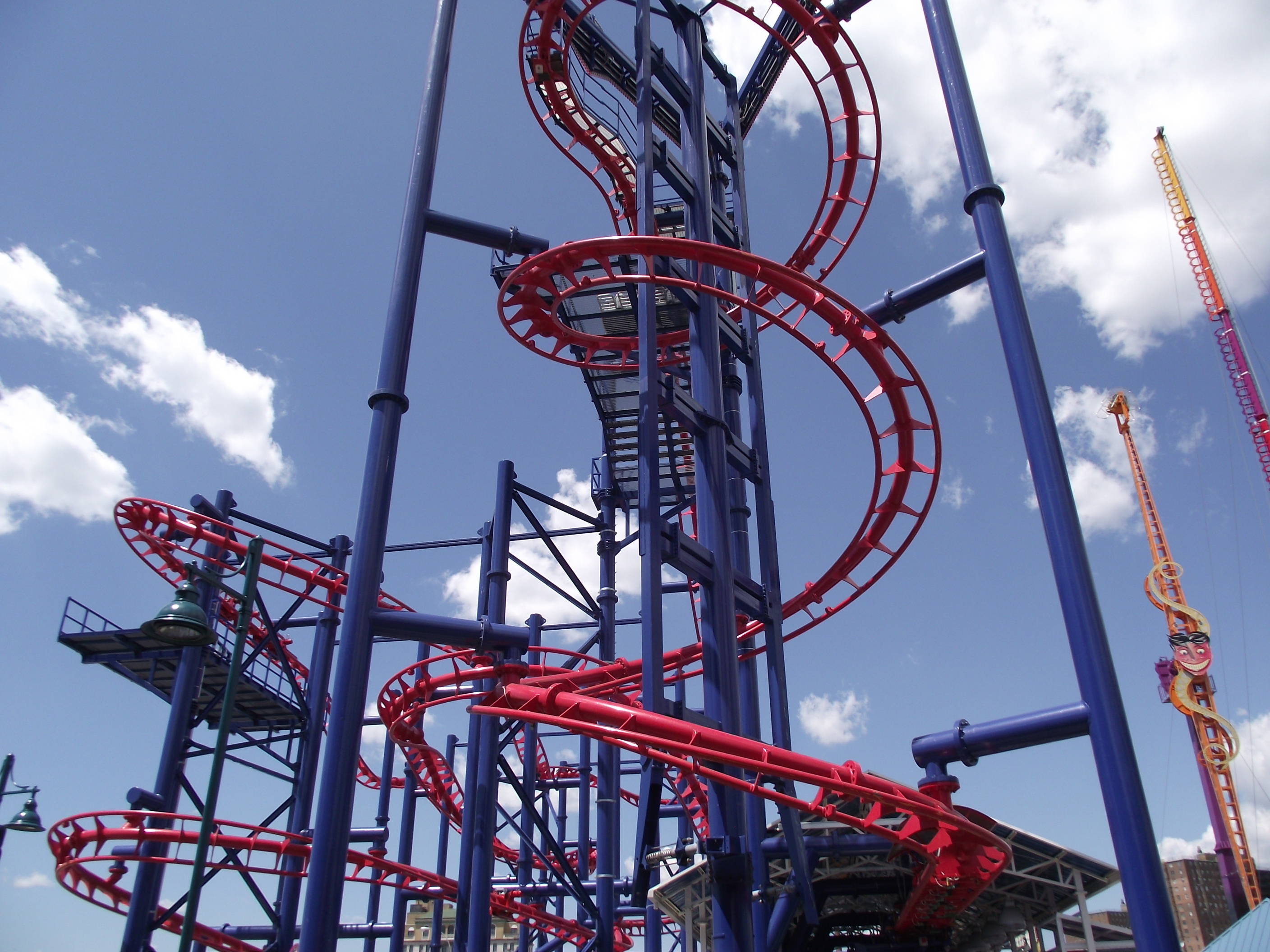

Luna Park, Coney Island
- Park section: Scream Zone
- Coordinates: 40.573848°N 73.980459°W
- Status: Operating
- Opening date: April 2011

Elitch Gardens
- Coordinates: 39.748338°N 105.011569°W
- Status: Removed
- Opening date: May 18, 2002
- Closing date: 2007

General statistics
- Type: Steel – Flying
- Manufacturer: Zamperla
- Designer: Werner Stengel
- Model: Volare
- Lift/launch system: Spiral Lift
- Height: 50 ft (15 m)
- Drop: 17 ft (5.2 m)
- Length: 1,282.8 ft (391.0 m)
- Speed: 25.7 mph (41.4 km/h)
- Inversions: 2
- Duration: 0:48
- Max vertical angle: 31°
- Capacity: 500 riders per hour
- G-force: 3.3
- Height restriction: 52 in (132 cm)
- Trains: 7 trains with a single car. Riders are arranged 4 across in a single row for a total of 4 riders per train.
- This is a Pay-Per-Use attraction
- Soarin' Eagle at RCDB

Soarin' Eagle is a steel roller coaster located at the Scream Zone at Luna Park in Coney Island, Brooklyn, New York. The ride was the first ever Zamperla "Volare" roller coaster when it opened in 2002 at Elitch Gardens (at the time the park was named Six Flags Elitch Gardens) in Denver, Colorado, as the Flying Coaster. The Elitch Gardens ride was constructed by Martin & Vleminckx. The Volare, the cheapest option for a flying roller coaster, contains a compact layout with a distinctive spiral lift hill. In late 2010 the ride got dismantled and relocated to Luna Park in Coney Island, where it opened in April 2011 as the Soarin' Eagle. The ride has an identical sister, Hero, which opened in July 2013 at Flamingo Land in North Yorkshire.

== Layout ==
Riders begin their experience of the Soarin' Eagle by boarding the four-across trains as they pass slowly along a moving walkway. The trains are originally upright so riders can walk up from behind and enter from a standing position. Each rider must select their desired height on a five rung series of ladder-like steps which determine how a rider will be positioned when the train tilts to the horizontal position upon leaving the station. Before departure, a cage is latched down over the backs of the trains to secure the riders for the duration of the trip. The train then heads up the spiral lift hill, which slowly twirls the train upward. After the lift, the train then heads down a short, steep drop and then ascends slowly back up. A hairpin turn then occurs and takes riders through the first Barrel Roll inversion. The train then hits another hairpin turn into another short drop. Another hairpin turn then leads the train into the second Barrel Roll and turns again.

The train is then slowed by the trim brakes and then twists through another set of hairpin turns and twists until the train slows by the final brake run. The train enters the station and completes the experience.

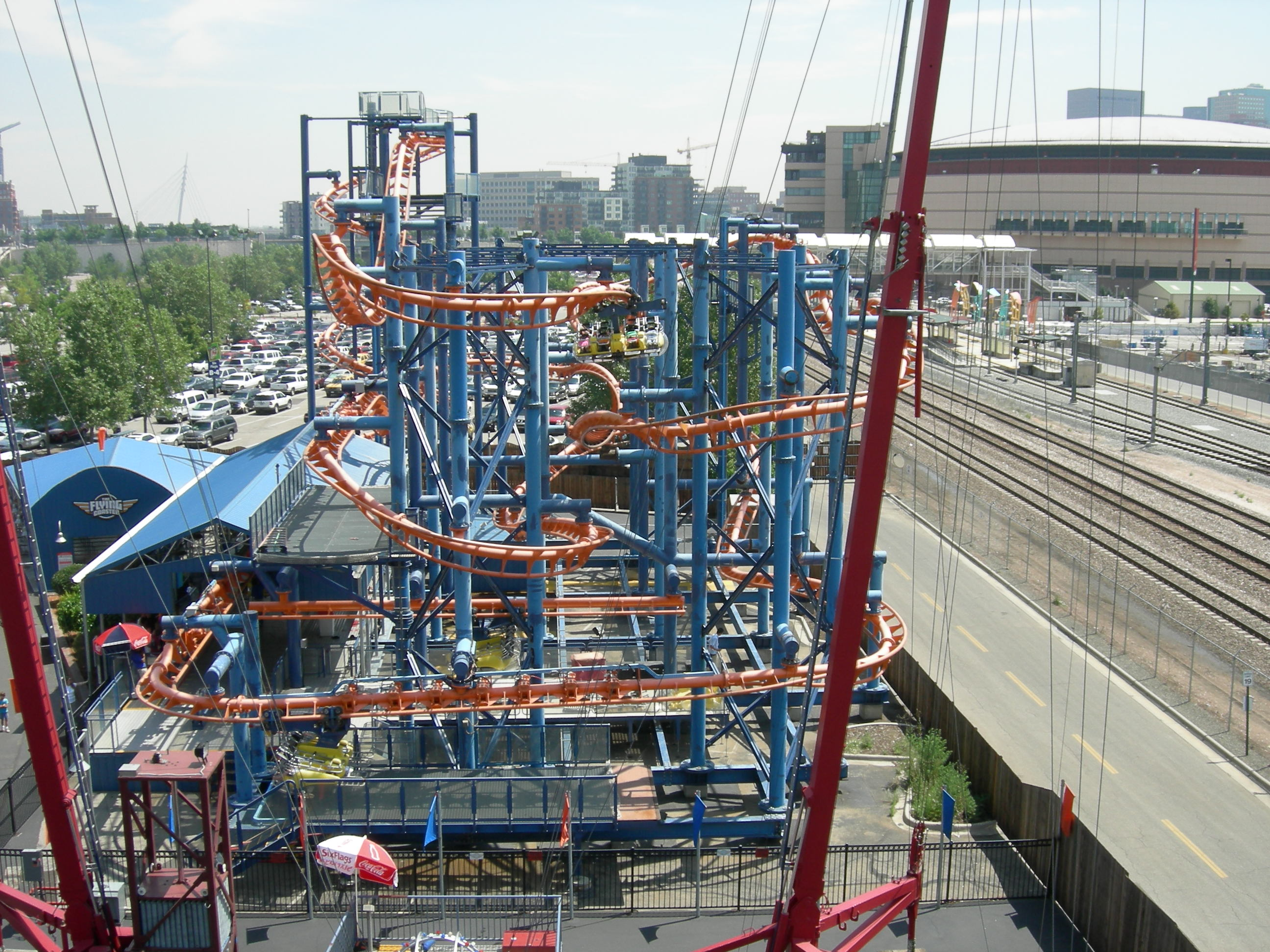
An overview of Soarin' Eagle's layout when it was located at Elitch Gardens

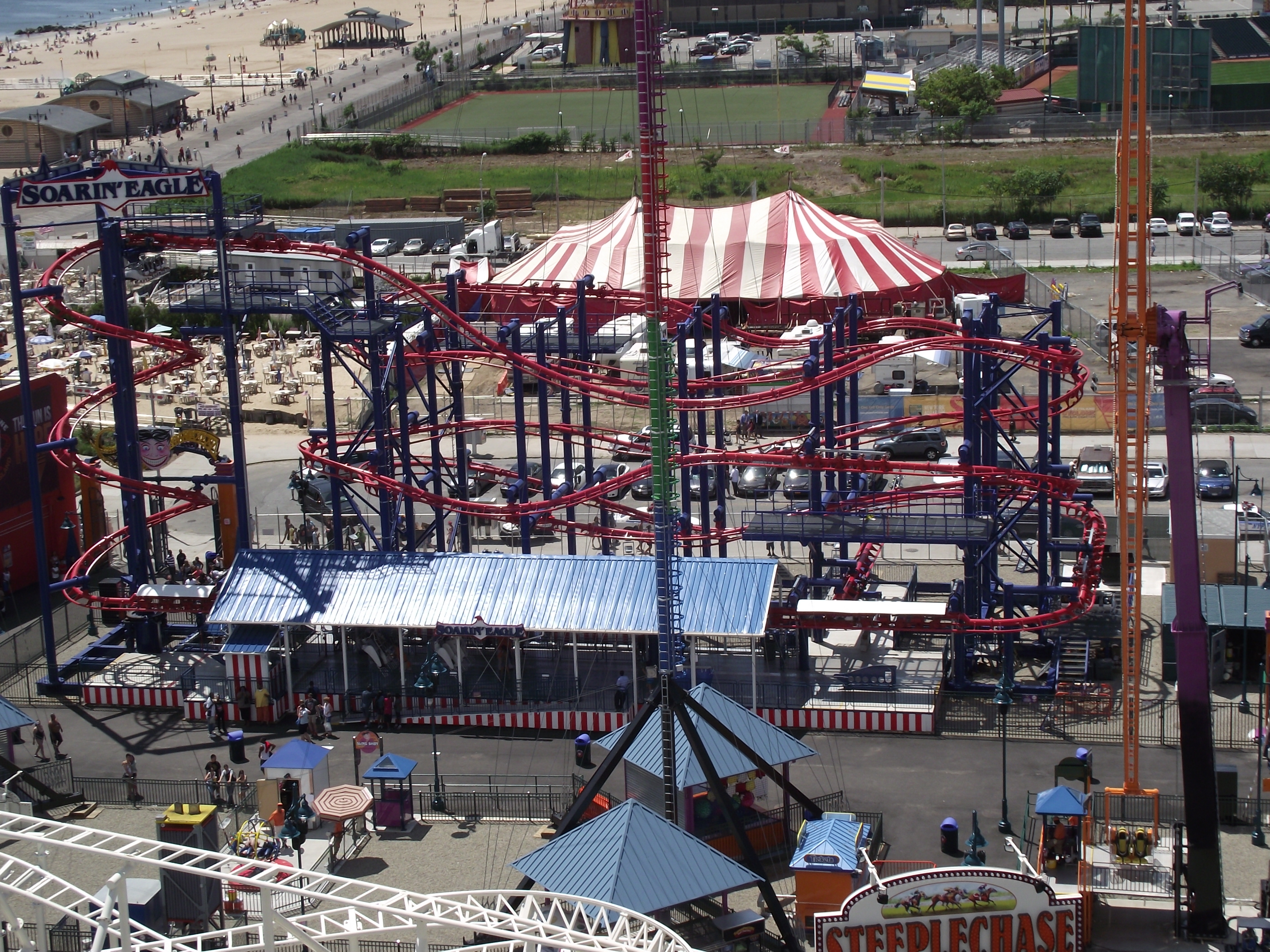
View of Soarin' Eagle after relocation to Luna Park, Coney Island

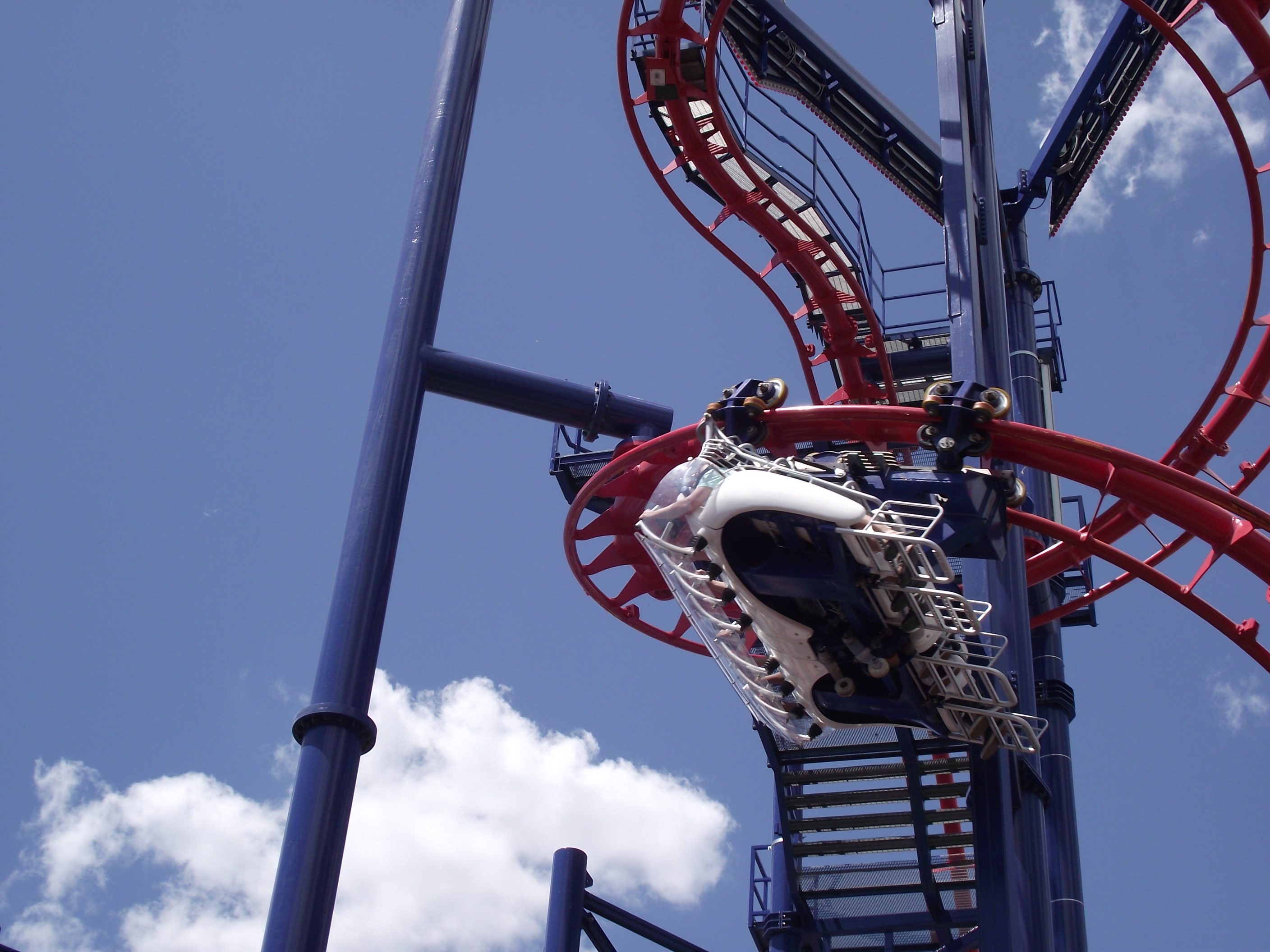
View of Soarin' Eagle from the ground

== See also ==
- 2011 in amusement parks
