= F.L.Y. (roller coaster) =

Flying roller coaster at Phantasialand

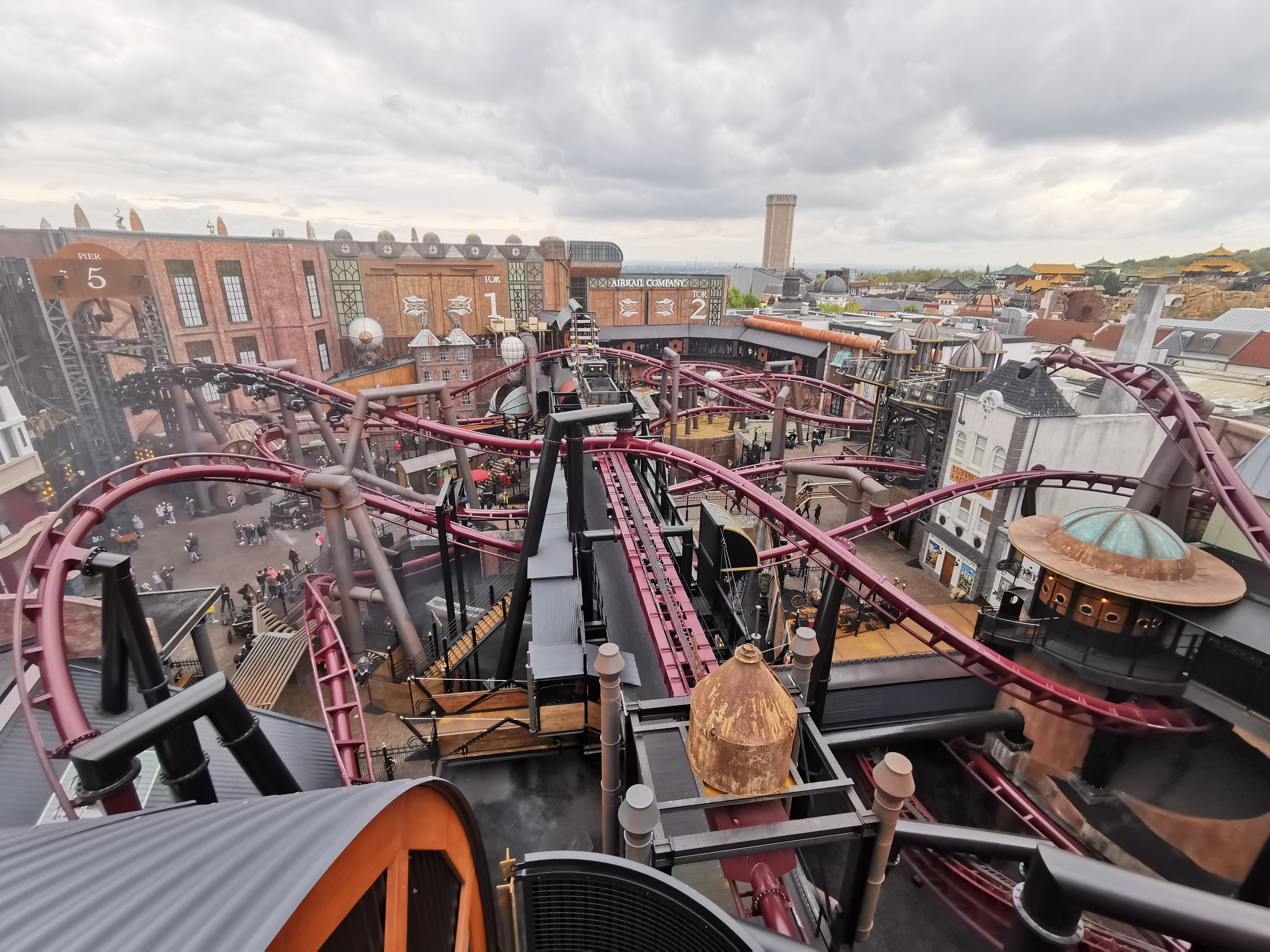

Phantasialand
- Location: Phantasialand
- Park section: Berlin - Rookburgh
- Coordinates: 50.799894°N 6.879231°E
- Status: Operating
- Soft opening date: September 17, 2020
- Replaced: Race for Atlantis

General statistics
- Type: Steel – Flying – Launched
- Manufacturer: Vekoma
- Model: Flying Coaster (Custom)
- Lift/launch system: LSM Launch
- Length: 4,055.1 ft (1,236.0 m)
- Speed: 48.5 mph (78.1 km/h)
- Inversions: 2
- Capacity: 1400 riders per hour
- Height restriction: 130–205 cm (4 ft 3 in – 6 ft 9 in)
- Trains: 4 trains with 10 cars; riders arranged 2 across in a single row for a total of 20 riders per train
- Theme: Steampunk
- Website: Official site
- F.L.Y. at RCDB

F.L.Y. (often stylized as Flying Launch Coaster or simply FLY) is a flying launched roller coaster at Phantasialand in Brühl, Germany. The coaster is the sole attraction of the Rookburgh area, a highly themed immersive Steampunk city, which was soft opened in September 2020 following several years of development and construction. During the ride, passengers sit in a prone position - facing the ground - while traversing two launches and navigating a heavily themed environment.

FLY was manufactured by Vekoma and features a completely redesigned set of flying coaster hardware unique to the coaster. Upon opening, it became the world's longest flying coaster as well as the first flying launch coaster.

FLY was lauded by park guests and amusement ride industry representatives alike, who praised the ride experience, thematic depth, and improved hardware.

== History ==
=== Concept and development ===
A flying roller coaster was shortlisted by Phantasialand's creative team as a project of interest sometime in the late 2000s. Development of the attraction began after work was completed on Chiapas in 2014, and Vekoma was almost immediately contracted as a partner. The park had two objectives for the design; first, the loading process was to be simple and streamlined. Loading procedures on existing flying coasters were often complex and cumbersome, due to the nature of the rider's stomach-down position. Secondly, the attraction would have to be a custom design, as it would be built on a limiting plot of land and fit the park's third hotel within it. In addition, the park faced height restrictions and aimed to create a heavily themed, immersive experience.

A new loading procedure and train design was created from scratch, where the trains and track would be able to rotate from an upright to prone position with ease. During the early 2010s, Vekoma had previously attempted to create a more refined procedure, in the form of a vertical load and launch setup. Although the concept was patented by Disney Enterprises, Inc. as a possible future project, it was ultimately never constructed. A prototype of the new system was constructed onsite at Vekoma's factory in Vlodrop during the summer of 2016. After some testing, the prototype was eventually dismantled and parts of the track and hardware were reused on FLY.

=== Construction ===
Race for Atlantis, an IMAX Simulator ride, was retired on January 17, 2016, and demolished shortly afterwards, along with an events building. A drill rig was delivered to the construction site in October 2016, and throughout the following months a pit was dug in the construction site. A wall was also erected on the northeast side of the construction site to block off views of construction from the Fantasy park area. On February 18, 2017, Phantasialand filed a trademark with the Deutsches Patent- und Markenamt (German Patent and Trade Mark Office), for the name ROOKBURGH.

On March 31, 2017, Phantasialand announced on social media that they had begun working on their next major project; the Steampunk Rookburgh area. Billboards stated that this would be their most heavily themed area yet, although an opening timeline was not given. Early reports indicated that the area would house a Vekoma flying roller coaster as its headlining attraction. On June 20, 2017, Phantasialand revealed that they had begun construction on their next roller coaster, F.L.Y., which promised to be the first flying launch coaster and the world's longest flying coaster. At the time, the latter title was held by the 3,688-foot (1,124 m) long Flying Dinosaur at Universal Studios Japan.

The construction of Rookburgh - a very dense, layered project - was a tedious and strategic process. Over the course of three years, the area was constructed mostly from the bottom-up. FLY's underground station, maintenance bays, and second launch were completed first, followed by much of the ride aboveground. Building structures interacting with the coaster were also erected. It is said that the first track piece was installed on August 1, 2017, and the final piece was placed on the highest point of the ride on April 25, 2019. Once the coaster was completed, much of the hotel and buildings finished construction around it, and closed the interior off from exterior view. Thematic decor and pathways were then completed over the course of several months.

=== Promotion and preparation ===
Following a prolonged silence on the project, Phantasialand released their sole animated trailer for Rookburgh on November 25, 2019. Days later, promotional material in the form of a mock newspaper dubbed the Rookburgh Gazette was distributed to park guests, offering insight on many of Rookburgh and FLY's features. FLY was first spotted testing in February 2020, and continued to do so during the spring and summer while Phantasialand began to work its operations around the COVID-19 pandemic.

After 3 years of anticipation, Rookburgh and FLY soft opened to the public on September 17, 2020, with COVID-induced capacity limitations in place. The area's Hotel Charles Lindbergh - named after the historic aviator - was opened to guests a few days later.

== Ride experience ==
=== Queue ===
Guests enter the standby queue through a set of stairs by the coaster's first launch, where they travel over the coaster and through the buildings making up Rookburgh's perimeter, encountering the occasional small set of switchbacks and high degrees of theming. After traversing a quarter of the area's perimeter, the path runs alongside the first launch before crossing under the queue entrance and onto ground level. Exiting another themed room, guests walk around FLY's helix and are then given the choice of queuing for front row or the rest of the train. Guests descend to considerable underground depths down a curved flight of stairs, entering a projection chamber informing riders of the loose article procedure. All loose articles upon each guests person are to be stored in two-way access lockers, as no loose articles are permitted beyond this point. An employee will be giving guests free locker wristbands, these differ in color for the front row and other row queues. In the next area, guests must empty their pockets and go through one of two metal detectors. They then make their way to the loading station where they queue again in lines based on their strap color and board their train.

=== Layout ===
Departing the station in the upright position, riders make a 180° right turn and pass by several Rookburgh advertisements in a dark ride section. Turning into the lift hill, riders pass by a projection of the Rookburgh city before the track and seats rotate riders into the prone flying position. The trains enter the outdoor portion and sends riders into the first launch. Immediately proceeding the launch, the trains navigate a left-hand cutback turn and a corkscrew inversion. Turning to the left, the layout twists over and under the launch before diving below the guest pathways, encircling the queue's descending stairs and entering the second launch below-ground. The launch takes the train through a darkened tunnel and up an incline, reaching the maximum above-ground height of the layout and sending riders into a spiral dive around the Hotel Charles Lindbergh. Speeding through soaring turns and near-misses with the surrounding buildings, the train navigates a helix situated directly overtop of the projection chamber. Traversing the final part of the layout, riders enter a second corkscrew-esque inversion and complete a final tight turn around the foundations of the hotel and into the brake run. The track and trains rotate, returning riders to the upright position before making a left hand turn into the unload station.

== Characteristics ==
=== Theme ===
FLY is located in the fictional Rookburgh, a steampunk industrial city situated close to 1920s Berlin. The city houses the Rookburgh AirRail Company, a revolutionary aerial transportation firm that has set out to enable flight for mankind. The AirRail company is behind the development and creation of FLY, a unique flying machine traveling high above and around the city.

Danish creative firm MK Themed Attractions designed and produced many of Rookburgh's themed elements, including a 1:1 replica of a Steam locomotive, which sits atop FLY's first launch. In addition, composers from IMAscore also worked extensively on sound design for both Rookburgh and FLY.

=== Statistics ===
FLY's statistics are closely guarded by Phantasialand, and the few made available have been disputed by alternate sources. Roller Coaster DataBase suggests that F.L.Y. is 1,236.0 meters (4,055.1 feet) long and reaches a top speed of 78.1 km/h (48.5 mph), while in multiple interviews the park has stated the length to be just under 1.3 kilometers (4,265 feet). In either case, F.L.Y. still holds the world record for longest flying roller coaster. F.L.Y. can run four trains at any given time, each of which consists of 10 cars that seat a pair of riders per row, making for an occupancy of 20 passengers per train. The coaster is contained within a compact 100 m x 75 m site.

== Reception ==
F.L.Y. and Rookburgh received unanimous acclaim from park guests and roller coaster enthusiasts alike. F.L.Y. subsequently won a European Star Award from the Kirmes Park & Revue magazine for Europe's Best New Coaster of 2020. In September 2021, it was nominated by American publicist Amusement Today for two of their annual Golden Ticket Awards - Best New Roller Coaster of 2020/2021 and Best New Attraction Installation - placing 3rd for each. Vekoma was also nominated at the same ceremony for a third award - Best Innovation - for their work on FLY's hardware, and later received an IAAPA Brass Ring Award for Best New Product in 2021.

Golden Ticket Awards: Top steel Roller Coasters
Year									1998	1999
Ranking									–	–
Year	2000	2001	2002	2003	2004	2005	2006	2007	2008	2009
Ranking	–	–	–	–	–	–	–	–	–	–
Year	2010	2011	2012	2013	2014	2015	2016	2017	2018	2019
Ranking	–	–	–	–	–	–	–	–	–	–
Year	2020	2021	2022	2023	2024	2025	2026			
Ranking	N/A	–	–	46	16	25	19			
