= Manta Ray (disambiguation) =

A manta ray is a large ray belonging to the genus Manta.

Manta Ray or Mantaray may also refer to:

- Manta Ray program, a DARPA R&D program for an American unmanned underwater vehicle
- Manta (platform), a South Korean digital comics platform
- Manta Ray (film), a 2018 Thai film
- Manta Ray (album), a 1994 album by Nan Vernon
- Mantaray (album), a 2007 album by Siouxsie
- "Manta Ray" (song), a 2015 song by J. Ralph
- "Manta Rays", a 2020 song by Chloe Moriondo
- Manta Ray (Transformers), a character from Transformers: Generation 2
- Manta Ray, a development of Mako Shark (concept car)
- The Mantaray (show rod), a customized car built in 1963

== See also ==
- Manta (disambiguation)
- Monterrey
