= Pish Mant-e Owl =

Pish Mant-e Owl پيش منت اول
- Village
- Location within Iran
- Coordinates: 25°40′48″N 60°24′36″E
- Country: Iran
- Province: Sistan and Baluchestan
- County: Konarak
- Bakhsh: Central
- Rural District: Jahliyan

Population (2006)
  - Total: 181
- Time zone: UTC+3:30 (IRST)
  - Summer (DST): UTC+4:30 (IRDT)

Pish Mant-e Owl (Persian: پيش منت اول, also Romanized as Pīsh Mant-e Owl; also known as Pish Mant-e Kahur) is a village in Jahliyan Rural District, in the Central District of Konarak County, Sistan and Baluchestan Province, Iran. At the 2006 census, its population was 181, in 45 families.
