= Manta (surname) =

Manta is a surname. Notable people with the surname include:

- Alexandru Manta (born 1977), Romanian rugby union player
- João Abel Manta (1928–2026), Portuguese architect, painter, illustrator and cartoonist
- Karina Manta (born 1996), American ice dancer
- Lorenzo Manta (born 1974), Swiss tennis player
- Paul Manta (born 1943), Romanian footballer
