= Mant Khas =

- Census town
- Location in Himachal Pradesh, India Mant Khas (India)
- Coordinates: 32.209742°N 76.3198113°E
- Country: India
- State: Himachal Pradesh
- District: Kangra

Population (2001)
  - Total: 5,240

Languages
  - Official: Hindi
  - Native: Pahari
- Time zone: UTC+5:30 (IST)

Mant Khas is a census town in Kangra district in the Indian state of Himachal Pradesh.

== Demographics ==
As of 2001 India census, Mant Khas had a population of 5240. Males constitute 51% of the population and females 49%. Mant Khas has an average literacy rate of 86%, higher than the national average of 59.5%: male literacy is 88%, and female literacy is 84%. In Mant Khas, 7% of the population is under 6 years of age.
