= The Flying Dinosaur =

Steel flying roller coaster

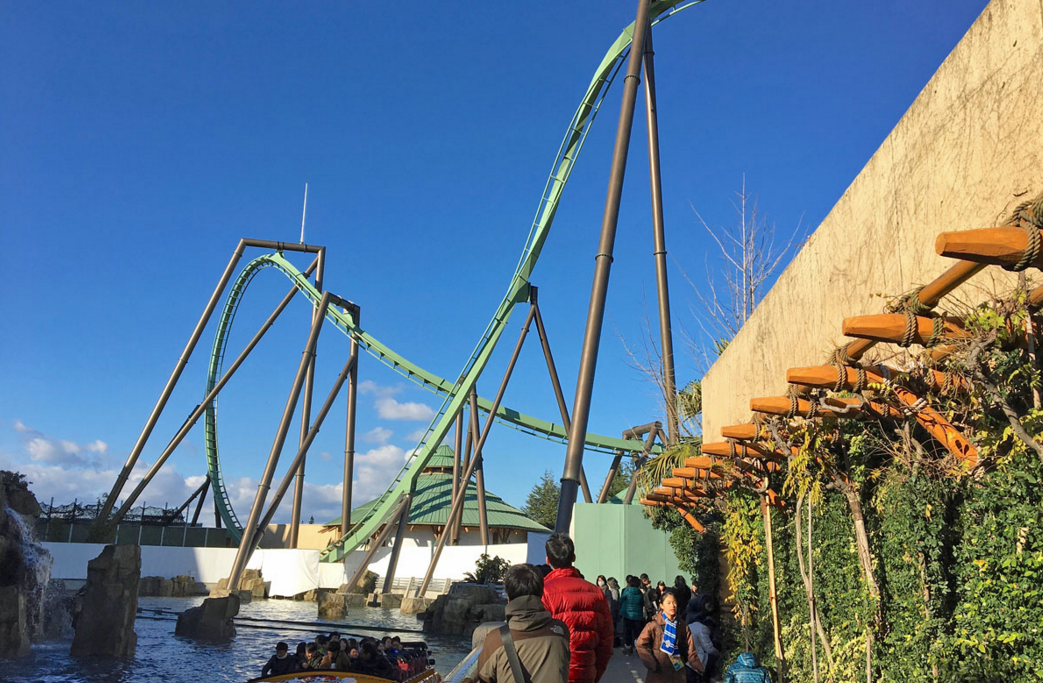
- Two massive inversions that soar high above the park.

Universal Studios Japan
- Location: Universal Studios Japan
- Park section: Jurassic Park
- Coordinates: 34.6634°N 135.4305°E
- Status: Operating
- Opening date: March 18, 2016

General statistics
- Type: Steel – Flying
- Manufacturer: Bolliger & Mabillard
- Model: Flying Coaster - Custom
- Lift/launch system: Chain lift hill
- Height: 151 ft (46 m)
- Drop: 124 ft (38 m)
- Length: 3,687.7 ft (1,124.0 m)
- Speed: 62 mph (100 km/h)
- Inversions: 5
- Height restriction: 52–78 in (132–198 cm)
- Trains: 4 trains with 8 cars. Riders are arranged 4 across in a single row for a total of 32 riders per train.
- The Flying Dinosaur at RCDB

The Flying Dinosaur is a steel flying roller coaster at Universal Studios Japan. Designed by Swiss firm Bolliger & Mabillard, Flying Dinosaur restrains riders in the prone position. This attraction opened on March 18, 2016, and is currently the world's second longest flying roller coaster, as the track length has been surpassed by F.L.Y. in Phantasialand, which opened in September 17, 2020.

== History ==
In June 2015, Universal Studios Japan confirmed that they would be adding a new Jurassic Park-themed attraction. Later in July, vertical construction began, when the park finished building the first supports and track. Later in August, the park released teasers around the park saying "The Greatest DINOSAUR RIDE IN THE WORLD! Coming in 2016...". Construction was going on for a while. Finally on October 2, 2015, the park officially announced that they were adding The Flying Dinosaur rollercoaster.

== Ride experience ==
The coaster starts in a dual station and leads into the lift hill. After it reaches the top, it drops 124 feet towards the ground and enters a zero-g roll, the first inversion, and then enters into a fly to lie element which makes riders face the sky. It then goes into a half pretzel loop and makes riders turn into a flying position again. Quickly, it turns into another pretzel loop, then enters a small tunnel at the bottom of the loop. It enters a small air-time element, then enters into the corkscrew. After the inversion, the train will enter a helix and comes to the final inversion, an inline twist which is just before the final brake run.
