= Mantas =

Mantas is a Lithuanian given name. People with the name include:

- Mantas Adomėnas (born 1972), philosopher
- Mantas Armalis (born 1992), professional ice hockey goaltender
- Mantas Dilys (born 1984), triple jumper
- Mantas Fridrikas (born 1988), footballer
- Mantas Jankavičius (born 1980), singer and actor
- Mantas Kalnietis (born 1986), basketball player
- Mantas Kuklys (born 1987), footballer
- Mantas Ruikis (born 1985), professional basketball player
- Mantas Samusiovas (born 1978), footballer
- Mantas Savėnas (born 1982), football midfielder
- Mantas Šilkauskas (born 1988), decathlete
- Mantas Strolia (born 1986), cross-country skier
