= Manta (SeaWorld Orlando) =

Roller coaster at SeaWorld Orlando

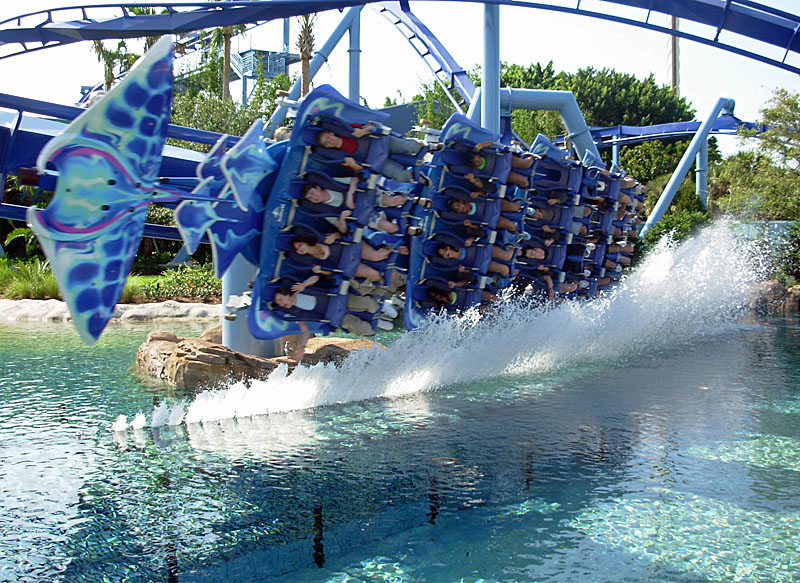
- A fountain timed to go off just as one of Manta's trains approaches the water

SeaWorld Orlando
- Location: SeaWorld Orlando
- Park section: Sea of Shallows
- Coordinates: 28°24′43″N 81°27′42″W
- Status: Operating
- Soft opening date: May 5, 2009
- Opening date: May 22, 2009
- Cost: $50,000,000

General statistics
- Type: Steel – Flying
- Manufacturer: Bolliger & Mabillard
- Designer: PGAV Destinations
- Model: Flying Coaster – Manta
- Lift/launch system: Chain lift hill
- Height: 140 ft (43 m)
- Drop: 113 ft (34 m)
- Length: 3,359 ft (1,024 m)
- Speed: 56 mph (90 km/h)
- Duration: 2:36
- Capacity: 1,500 riders per hour
- G-force: 3.7
- Height restriction: 54 in (137 cm)
- Trains: 3 trains with 8 cars; riders arranged 4 across in a single row for a total of 32 riders per train
- Quick Queue available
- Manta at RCDB

Manta is a steel flying roller coaster at SeaWorld Orlando in Orlando, Florida. The ride is 140 feet (43m) tall, 3,359 feet long (1,024 m), and reaches top speeds of 56 mph (90 km/h). Designed by Bolliger & Mabillard, Manta restrains riders in the prone position and features four inversions. The attraction opened to the public on May 22, 2009. The ride showcases many rays in exhibits throughout its queue. Its slogan is "Dive deep, fly high."

== History ==
SeaWorld Orlando revealed the concept that was to become Manta to a gathering of travel industry representatives and community leaders on April 2, 2008, although it had been in the planning stages for years prior. The exact specifications were not immediately revealed, but the park said it would be their largest single investment in an attraction and that it would open sometime in 2009. The park also announced that the attraction would include a roller coaster, but that it would be more than just a roller coaster. Joseph Couceiro, vice president of sales and marketing, described the ride as "the next generation SeaWorld attraction" which would immerse guests in elements of marine life.

Artists' concepts of the new attraction were leaked to the internet in April 2008. SeaWorld officials would not confirm whether the images were accurate representations of the final design, but said that the roller coaster would have a gliding sensation. At that point, construction on a large site within the park had already begun. On May 29, 2008, park officials confirmed that the attraction would be named Manta, and announced additional details about it.

Construction of the roller coaster track and related buildings began in September 2008. Superior Rigging & Erection constructed the supports and track. The ride's layout was completed in December 2008, and construction on other parts of the roller coaster continued into early 2009. SeaWorld began previewing the attraction in early May 2009, before it officially opened on May 22.

== Ride experience ==
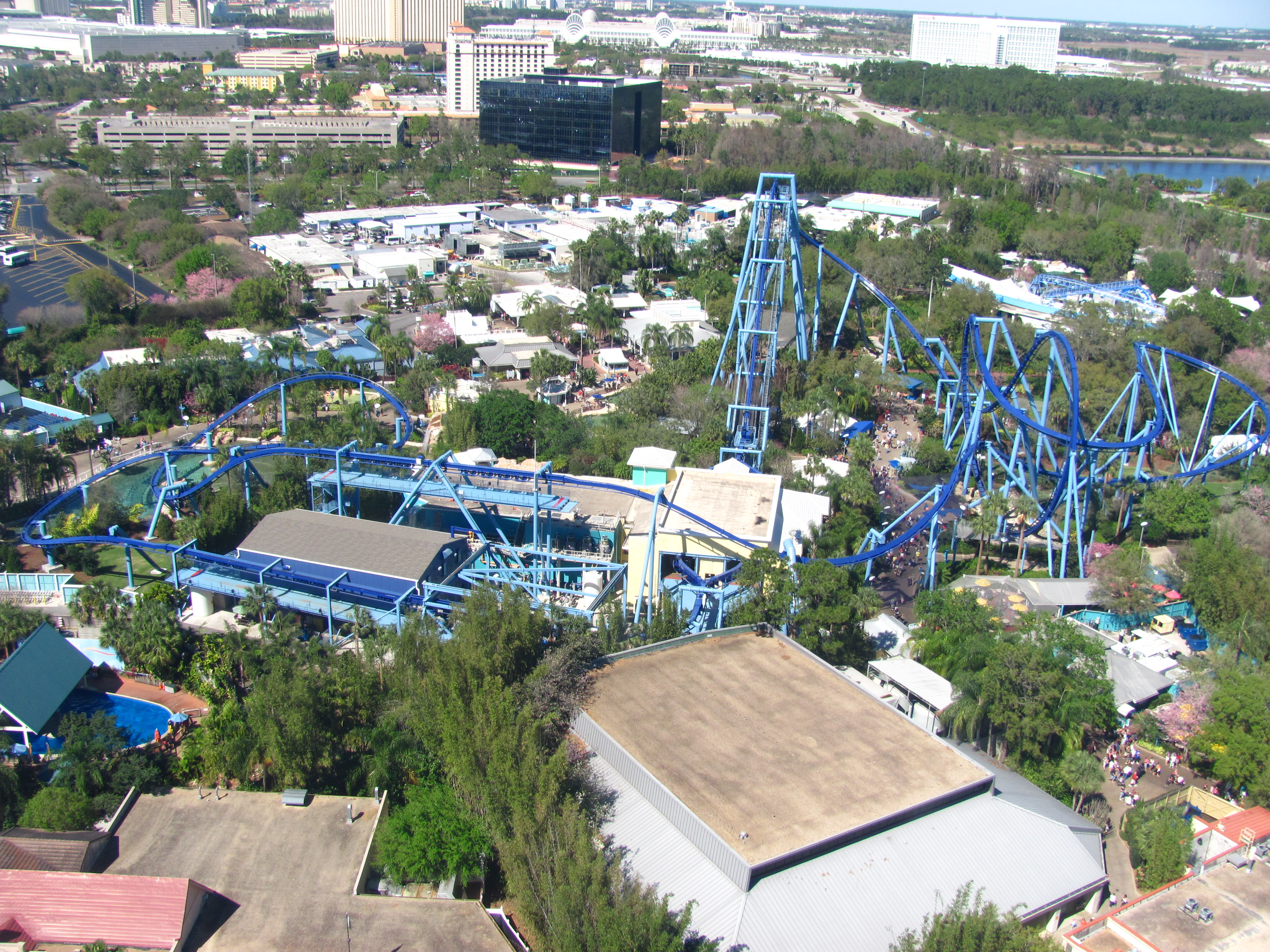
An overview of Manta's track layout in 2012

Manta features a dual station configuration, which allows two trains to be loaded at the same time, thus increasing the ride's capacity. After departing from the station, the train will make either a slight left or right turn—depending on which station it leaves—into the 140-foot (43 m) chain lift hill. From the top of the lift hill, the train makes a 113-foot (34 m) downward right-turning drop into a 98-foot (30 m)-tall pretzel loop, after which it turns left, leading into the first of two inline twists. The train then makes a right turn followed by a slight upward left turn into a corkscrew, before turning right into the mid-course brake run. The train then drops to a point just above a body of water, at the same time making a 270-degree right turn, where water jets spray up near the train to simulate the effect of the train actually hitting the water. After exiting the turn, the train passes a waterfall, traverses the second inline twist, and makes a left turn into the final brake run before returning to the station.

== Characteristics ==
=== Theme and surrounding experience ===
Manta is an attraction which encompasses a themed queue and a roller coaster. The queue is designed to resemble a seaside village, decorated with mosaics and artwork inspired by rays. Within the attraction's 4-acre (16,000 m^{2}) site are ten aquaria containing 184,000 US gallons (700,000 L; 153,000 imp gal) of water. Approximately 3,000 animals representing over 60 species are visible—including over 300 rays, such as cownose rays and spotted eagle rays. Other creatures on display include seahorses, leafy seadragons, and various tropical fish.

Portions of the aquarium exhibit can be viewed by guests who do not wish to ride the roller coaster. Non-riding guests can use a second entrance to the attraction area, which is separated from those waiting for the roller coaster. Guests in the ride's queue have access to special exhibit components, such as a Plexiglas "pop-up" window into the aquarium.

=== Trains and loading procedure ===
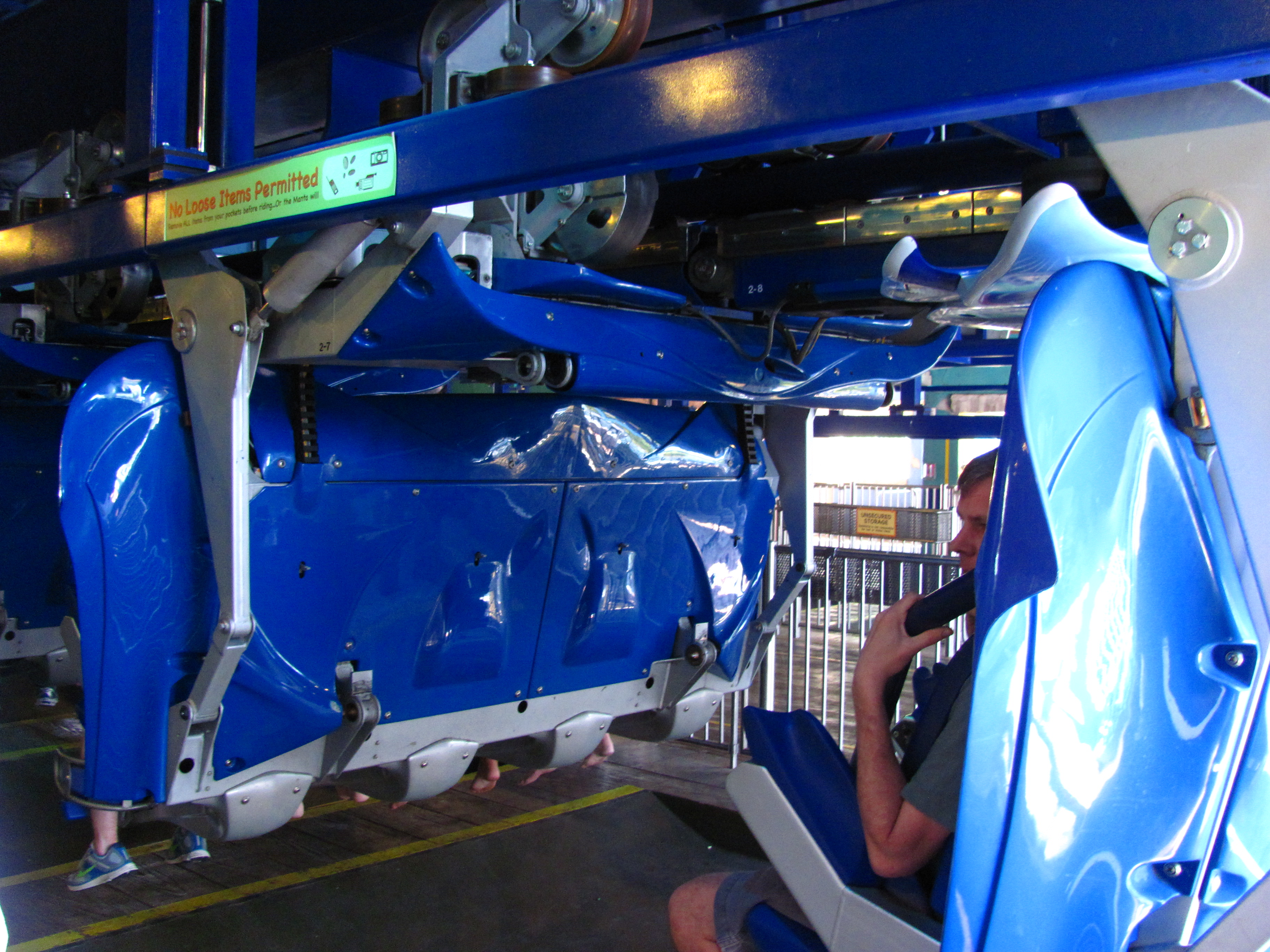
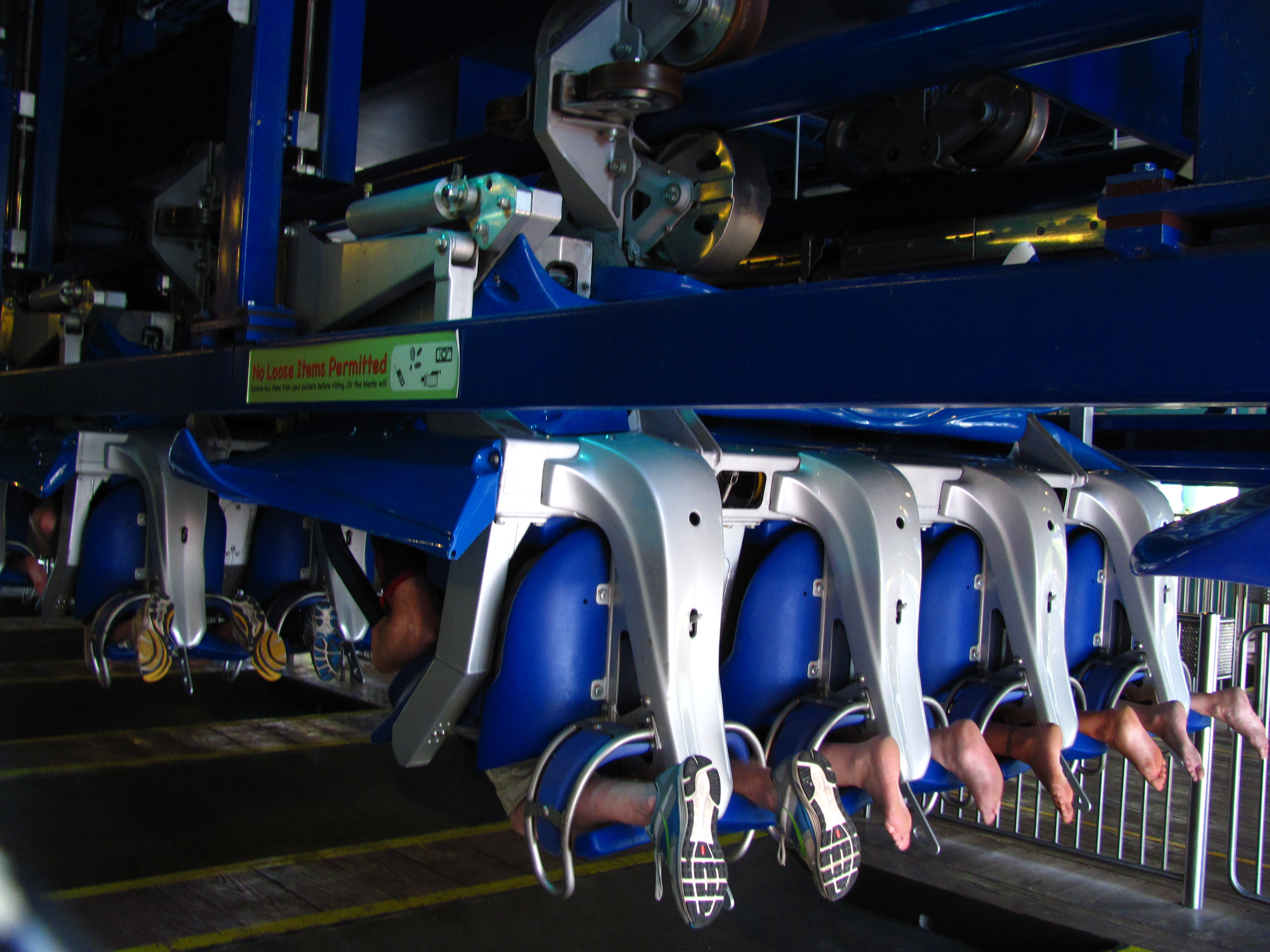
One of Manta's trains in the loading position (left) and flying position (right)

Manta is a flying roller coaster, which simulates the sensation of flight. It is designed to resemble the way manta rays glide through seawater. Guests are initially seated upright on one of three trains in one of eight rows that hold four passengers each, accommodating up to 32 riders per train. Before departure, mechanisms in the station raise the cars up to the track, such that the riders' faces are parallel to the track. Guests are secured in their seats using a locking lap bar, a vest-like harness, and flaps at the riders' ankles to hold their feet in place.

The lead car is shaped like a manta ray with a wingspan of 12 feet (3.7 m). In the original plans, the wing of the car was intended to make contact with water at a certain point of the ride, but Bolliger & Mabillard decided the idea would not work, and a fountain was used to create the effect instead. The roller coaster's color scheme includes deep purple, ultramarine blue, and cobalt.

=== Track ===
The steel box track of Manta is 3,359 feet (1,024 m) long and lift hill is 140 feet (43 m) high. It features four inversions: a pretzel loop, two inline twists, and one corkscrew. The track is dark blue and the supports are light blue. Friction brakes are used to control the speed of the train. The track was fabricated at the Ohio-based Clermont Steel Fabricators. Manta's rails, supports and track are filled with sand to reduce noise. In 2015, a ride identical in layout to Manta opened at Nagashima Spa Land under the name Acrobat.

== Reception ==
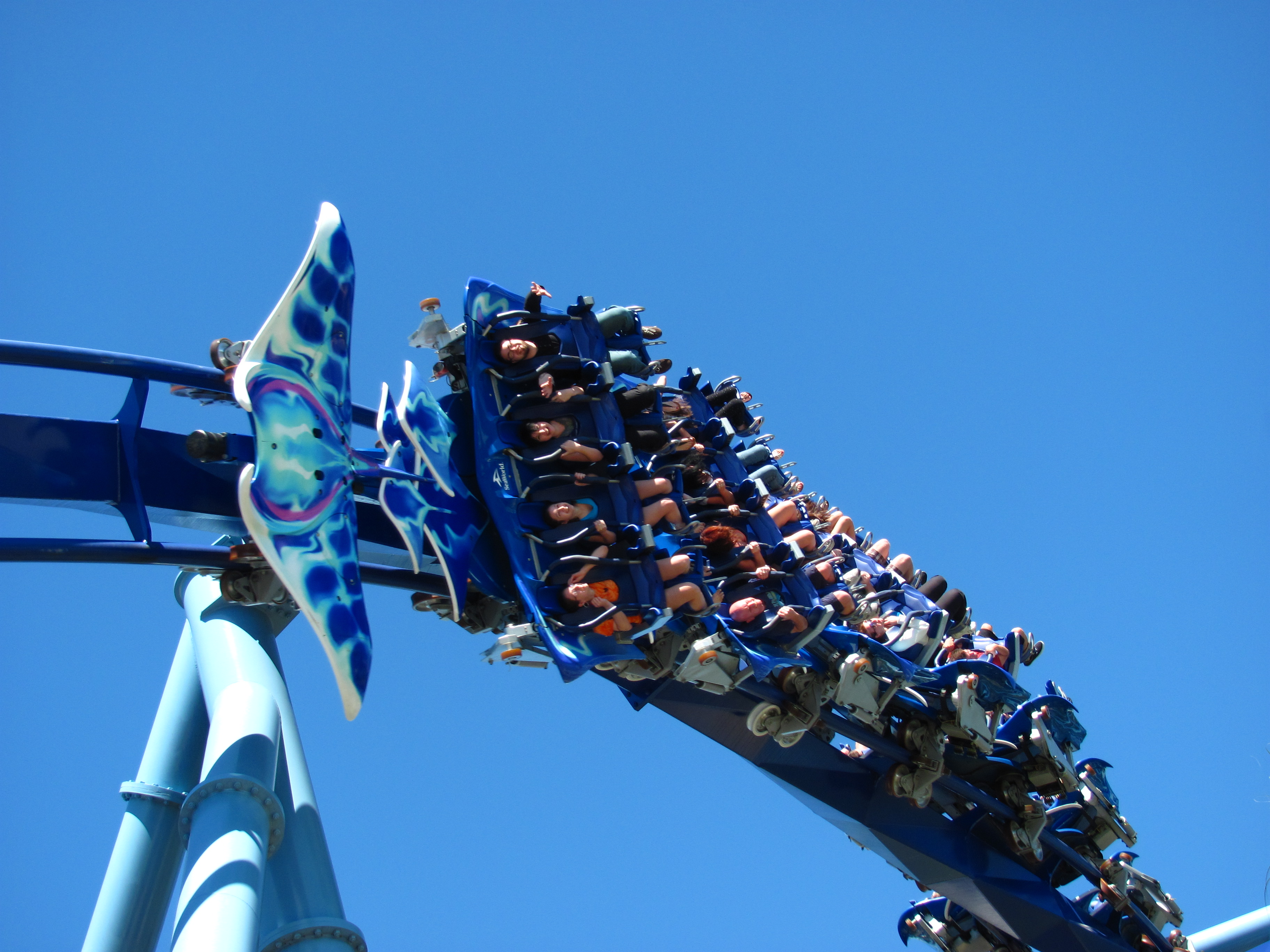
One of Manta's trains

Manta was received well after its debut May 2009. Busch Entertainment Corporation, SeaWorld Orlando's parent company at the time, credited Manta with improving park attendance. In July 2009, Theme Park Insider named Manta the best new attraction of 2009. In September 2009, Manta placed third in Amusement Today magazine's poll for the Best New Ride of 2009. It has ranked several times in Amusement Today's top 50 steel roller coaster list as well, peaking at 33 in 2010.

Golden Ticket Awards: Top steel Roller Coasters
Year									1998	1999
Ranking									–	–
Year	2000	2001	2002	2003	2004	2005	2006	2007	2008	2009
Ranking	–	–	–	–	–	–	–	–	–	39
Year	2010	2011	2012	2013	2014	2015	2016	2017	2018	2019
Ranking	33	45 (tie)	34	–	–	43	–	–	–	–
Year	2020	2021	2022	2023	2024	2025	2026			
Ranking	N/A	–	–	–	–	–	–			

== See also ==
- Manta (SeaWorld San Diego)
- Texas Stingray
