= List of Bolliger & Mabillard rides =

This is a list of Bolliger & Mabillard roller coasters. This list includes all coasters manufactured by the company. (Note: All roller coasters manufactured to North America are manufactured through Clermont Steel Fabrications, and have been since the company was first contracted to design and build roller coasters)

== List of roller coasters ==
As of 2025, Bolliger & Mabillard has built 132 roller coasters around the world.

| Name | Model | Park | Country | Opened | Status |
|---|---|---|---|---|---|
| Vortex | Stand-Up Coaster | Carowinds | United States | 1992 | Operating |
| Batman: The Ride | Inverted Coaster | Six Flags Great America | United States | 1992 | Operating |
| Flight Deck; Formerly Top Gun | Inverted Coaster | California's Great America | United States | 1993 | Operating |
| Batman: The Ride | Inverted Coaster | Six Flags Great Adventure | United States | 1993 | Operating |
| Kumba | Sitting Coaster | Busch Gardens Tampa | United States | 1993 | Closed |
| Batman: The Ride | Inverted Coaster | Six Flags Magic Mountain | United States | 1994 | Operating |
| Diavlo | Inverted Coaster | Himeji Central Park | Japan | 1994 | Operating |
| Nemesis Reborn; Formerly Nemesis | Inverted Coaster | Alton Towers | United Kingdom | 1994 | Operating |
| Raptor | Inverted Coaster | Cedar Point | United States | 1994 | Operating |
| Batman: The Ride | Inverted Coaster | Mid America Adventure | United States | 1995 | Operating |
| Dragon Khan | Sitting Coaster | PortAventura Park | Spain | 1995 | Operating |
| Montu | Inverted Coaster | Busch Gardens Tampa | United States | 1996 | Operating |
| Alpengeist | Inverted Coaster | Busch Gardens Williamsburg | United States | 1997 | Operating |
| Batman: The Ride | Inverted Coaster | Six Flags Over Georgia | United States | 1997 | Operating |
| Pyrenees | Inverted Coaster | Parque Espana-Shima Spain Village | Japan | 1997 | Operating |
| Great White | Inverted Coaster | SeaWorld San Antonio | United States | 1997 | Operating |
| Oblivion | Dive Coaster | Alton Towers | United Kingdom | 1998 | Operating |
| Great Bear | Inverted Coaster | Hersheypark | United States | 1998 | Operating |
| The Riddler's Revenge | Stand-Up Coaster | Six Flags Magic Mountain | United States | 1998 | Operating |
| Afterburn; Formerly Top Gun - The Jet Coaster | Inverted Coaster | Carowinds | United States | 1999 | Operating |
| Medusa; Formerly Bizarro | Floorless Coaster | Six Flags Great Adventure | United States | 1999 | Operating |
| Incredible Hulk | Sitting Coaster | Universal Islands of Adventure | United States | 1999 | Operating |
| Dragon Challenge; Formerly Dueling Dragons | Inverted Coaster | Universal Islands of Adventure | United States | 1999 | Removed |
| Batman: The Ride | Inverted Coaster | Six Flags Over Texas | United States | 1999 | Operating |
| Apollo's Chariot | Hyper Coaster | Busch Gardens Williamsburg | United States | 1999 | Operating |
| Raging Bull | Hyper Coaster | Six Flags Great America | United States | 1999 | Operating |
| Georgia Scorcher | Stand-Up Coaster | Six Flags Over Georgia | United States | 1999 | Operating |
| Kraken; Formerly Kraken Unleashed | Floorless Coaster | SeaWorld Orlando | United States | 2000 | Operating |
| Medusa | Floorless Coaster | Six Flags Discovery Kingdom | United States | 2000 | Operating |
| Katun | Inverted Coaster | Mirabilandia | Italy | 2000 | Operating |
| Superman: Krypton Coaster | Floorless Coaster | Six Flags Fiesta Texas | United States | 2000 | Operating |
| Diving Machine G5 | Dive Coaster | Janfusun Fancyworld | Taiwan | 2000 | Operating |
| Insane Speed | Floorless Coaster | Janfusun Fancyworld | Taiwan | 2001 | Operating |
| Nitro | Hyper Coaster | Six Flags Great Adventure | United States | 2001 | Operating |
| Talon | Inverted Coaster | Dorney Park | United States | 2001 | Operating |
| Wildfire | Sitting Coaster | Silver Dollar City | United States | 2001 | Operating |
| Galactica; Formerly Air | Flying Coaster | Alton Towers | United Kingdom | 2002 | Operating |
| Batman: The Dark Knight | Floorless Coaster | Six Flags New England | United States | 2002 | Operating |
| Shadows of Arkham; Formerly Batman: La Fuga; Formerly Batman: Arkham Asylum | Inverted Coaster | Parque Warner Madrid | Spain | 2002 | Operating |
| Silver Star | Hyper Coaster | Europa Park | Germany | 2002 | Operating |
| Superman: La Atracción de Acero | Floorless Coaster | Parque Warner Madrid | Spain | 2002 | Operating |
| Superman: Ultimate Flight | Flying Coaster | Six Flags Over Georgia | United States | 2002 | Operating |
| Vampire | Inverted Coaster | La Ronde | Canada | 2002 | Operating |
| Nemesis Inferno | Inverted Coaster | Thorpe Park | United Kingdom | 2003 | Operating |
| Scream | Floorless Coaster | Six Flags Magic Mountain | United States | 2003 | Operating |
| Superman: Ultimate Flight | Flying Coaster | Six Flags Great America | United States | 2003 | Operating |
| Superman: Ultimate Flight | Flying Coaster | Six Flags Great Adventure | United States | 2003 | Operating |
| Dæmonen | Floorless Coaster | Tivoli Gardens | Denmark | 2004 | Operating |
| Lightning | Inverted Coaster | Kuwait Entertainment City | Kuwait | 2004 | Removed |
| Silver Bullet | Inverted Coaster | Knott's Berry Farm | United States | 2004 | Operating |
| Hydra the Revenge | Floorless Coaster | Dorney Park | United States | 2005 | Operating |
| SheiKra | Dive Coaster | Busch Gardens Tampa | United States | 2005 | Operating |
| Black Mamba | Inverted Coaster | Phantasialand | Germany | 2006 | Operating |
| Crystal Wing | Flying Coaster | Happy Valley Beijing | China | 2006 | Operating |
| Goliath | Hyper Coaster | La Ronde | Canada | 2006 | Operating |
| Goliath | Hyper Coaster | Six Flags Over Georgia | United States | 2006 | Operating |
| Patriot | Inverted Coaster | Worlds of Fun | United States | 2006 | Operating |
| Tatsu | Flying Coaster | Six Flags Magic Mountain | United States | 2006 | Operating |
| Griffon | Dive Coaster | Busch Gardens Williamsburg | United States | 2007 | Operating |
| Hollywood Dream: The Ride | Hyper Coaster | Universal Studios Japan | Japan | 2007 | Operating |
| Phaethon | Inverted Coaster | Gyeongju World | South Korea | 2007 | Operating |
| Behemoth | Hyper Coaster | Canada's Wonderland | Canada | 2008 | Operating |
| Dive Coaster | Dive Coaster | Chimelong Paradise | China | 2008 | Operating |
| Dominator; Formerly Batman: Knight Flight | Floorless Coaster | Kings Dominion; Geauga Lake | United States | 2008; 2000 to 2007 | Operating |
| Chupacabra; Formerly Goliath; Formerly Batman: The Ride; Formerly Gambit | Inverted Coaster | Six Flags Fiesta Texas; Six Flags New Orleans; Thrill Valley | United States | 2008; 2003 to 2005; 1995 to 2002 | Operating |
| Diamondback | Hyper Coaster | Kings Island | United States | 2009 | Operating |
| Diving Coaster | Dive Coaster | Happy Valley Shanghai | China | 2009 | Operating |
| Manta | Flying Coaster | SeaWorld Orlando | United States | 2009 | Operating |
| Monster; Formerly Orochi | Inverted Coaster | Walygator Parc; Expoland | France | 2010; 1996 to 2007 | Operating |
| Thunder Striker; Formerly Intimidator | Hyper Coaster | Carowinds | United States | 2010 | Operating |
| Green Lantern; Formerly Chang | Stand-Up Coaster | Six Flags Great Adventure; Kentucky Kingdom | United States | 2011; 1997 to 2009 | Removed |
| Hair Raiser | Floorless Coaster | Ocean Park Hong Kong | Hong Kong | 2011 | Operating |
| Krake | Dive Coaster | Heide Park | Germany | 2011 | Operating |
| Raptor | Wing Coaster | Gardaland | Italy | 2011 | Operating |
| Starry Sky Ripper; Formerly Sky Scrapper | Flying Coaster | Joyland | China | 2011 | Operating |
| Leviathan | Hyper Coaster | Canada's Wonderland | Canada | 2012 | Operating |
| OzIris | Inverted Coaster | Parc Astérix | France | 2012 | Operating |
| Shambhala | Hyper Coaster | PortAventura Park | Spain | 2012 | Operating |
| Swarm | Wing Coaster | Thorpe Park | United Kingdom | 2012 | Operating |
| Wild Eagle | Wing Coaster | Dollywood | United States | 2012 | Operating |
| X-Flight | Wing Coaster | Six Flags Great America | United States | 2012 | Operating |
| GateKeeper | Wing Coaster | Cedar Point | United States | 2013 | Operating |
| Nitro | Floorless Coaster | Adlabs Imagica | India | 2013 | Operating |
| Banshee | Inverted Coaster | Kings Island | United States | 2014 | Operating |
| Parrot Coaster; Formerly Flying over the Rainforest | Wing Coaster | Chimelong Ocean Kingdom | China | 2014 | Operating |
| Flug der Dämonen | Wing Coaster | Heide Park | Germany | 2014 | Operating |
| Family Inverted Coaster | Family Inverted Coaster | Happy Valley Shanghai | China | 2014 | Operating |
| Harpy | Flying Coaster | Xishuangbanna Sunac Land | China | 2015 | SBNO |
| Rougarou; Formerly Mantis | Floorless Coaster; Formerly Stand-Up Coaster | Cedar Point | United States | 2015; 1996 to 2014 | Operating |
| Acrobat | Flying Coaster | Nagashima Spa Land | Japan | 2015 | Operating |
| Thunderbird | Wing Coaster | Holiday World | United States | 2015 | Operating |
| Oblivion: The Black Hole | Dive Coaster | Gardaland | Italy | 2015 | Operating |
| Baron 1898 | Dive Coaster | Efteling | Netherlands | 2015 | Operating |
| Fury 325 | Hyper Coaster | Carowinds | United States | 2015 | Operating |
| Mako | Hyper Coaster | SeaWorld Orlando | United States | 2016 | Operating |
| The Flying Dinosaur | Flying Coaster | Universal Studios Japan | Japan | 2016 | Operating |
| Valravn | Dive Coaster | Cedar Point | United States | 2016 | Operating |
| Dragon's Run; Formerly Time Machine; Formerly Led Zeppelin - The Ride | Sitting Coaster | Dragon Park Ha Long; Freestyle Music Park; Hard Rock Park | Vietnam | 2017; 2009; 2008 | Operating |
| Patriot; Formerly Vortex | Floorless Coaster; Formerly Stand-Up Coaster | California's Great America | United States | 2017; 1991 to 2016 | Operating |
| Flying Wing Coaster | Wing Coaster | Happy Valley Chongqing | China | 2017 | Operating |
| Draken | Dive Coaster | Gyeongju World | South Korea | 2018 | Operating |
| Flying Apsaras in Western Region | Dive Coaster | Happy Valley Chengdu | China | 2018 | Operating |
| Valkyria | Dive Coaster | Liseberg | Sweden | 2018 | Operating |
| Family Inverted Coaster | Family Inverted Coaster | Happy Valley Beijing | China | 2018 | Operating |
| Wing Coaster | Wing Coaster | Colourful Yunnan Happy World | China | 2018 | Operating |
| Fēnix | Wing Coaster | Toverland | Netherlands | 2018 | Operating |
| Heaven's Wing | Wing Coaster | HB World | China | 2018 | Operating |
| Yukon Striker | Dive Coaster | Canada's Wonderland | Canada | 2019 | Operating |
| Firebird; Formerly Apocalypse; Formerly Iron Wolf | Floorless Coaster; Formerly Stand-Up Coaster | Six Flags America; Six Flags Great America | United States | 2019; 2012 to 2018; 1990 to 2011 | Closed |
| Unknown | Wing Coaster | Hot Go Dreamworld | China | Unknown | SBNO |
| Unknown | Hyper Coaster | Hot Go Dreamworld | China | Unknown | SBNO |
| Flight of the Himalayan Eagle Music Roller Coaster | Hyper Coaster | Happy Valley Beijing | China | 2019 | Operating |
| Falcon | Wing Coaster | Wuxi Sunac Land | China | 2019 | Operating |
| Forest Predator | Wing Coaster | Happy Valley Nanjing | China | 2020 | Operating |
| Candymonium | Hyper Coaster | Hersheypark | United States | 2020 | Operating |
| Orion | Hyper Coaster | Kings Island | United States | 2020 | Operating |
| Monster | Inverted Coaster | Gröna Lund | Sweden | 2021 | Operating |
| Decepticoaster | Sitting Coaster | Universal Studios Beijing | China | 2021 | Operating |
| Emperor | Dive Coaster | SeaWorld San Diego | United States | 2022 | Operating |
| DaVinci Ride | Wing Coaster | Fantasy Valley | China | 2022 | Operating |
| Dr. Diabolical’s Cliffhanger | Dive Coaster | Six Flags Fiesta Texas | United States | 2022 | Operating |
| Maximus - Der Flug des Wächters | Wing Coaster | Legoland Deutschland | Germany | 2023 | Operating |
| Pipeline: The Surf Coaster | Surf Coaster | SeaWorld Orlando | United States | 2023 | Operating |
| Mandrill Mayhem | Wing Coaster | Chessington World of Adventures | United Kingdom | 2023 | Operating |
| Iron Menace | Dive Coaster | Dorney Park | United States | 2024 | Operating |
| Penguin Trek | Family Launch Coaster | SeaWorld Orlando | United States | 2024 | Operating |
| Phoenix Rising | Family Inverted Coaster | Busch Gardens Tampa | United States | 2024 | Operating |
| Rapterra | Wing Coaster | Kings Dominion | United States | 2025 | Operating |
| Big Bad Wolf: The Wolf's Revenge | Family Inverted Coaster | Busch Gardens Williamsburg | United States | 2025 | Operating |
| Wrath of Rakshasa | Dive Coaster | Six Flags Great America | United States | 2025 | Operating |
| Big LEGO Coaster | Family Inverted Coaster | Legoland Shanghai | China | 2025 | Operating |
| Tanjora | Inverted Coaster | Wonderla Amusement Park Chennai | India | 2025 | Operating |
| Barracuda Strike | Family Inverted Coaster | SeaWorld San Antonio | United States | 2026 | Operating |
| Tormenta Rampaging Run | Dive Coaster | Six Flags Over Texas | United States | 2026 | Operating |
| Unknown | Family Inverted Coaster | Legoland Sichuan | China | 2026 | Under construction |
| Unknown | Family Inverted Coaster | Legoland Shenzhen | China | 2026 | Under construction |
| Rokan | Wing Coaster | Energylandia | Poland | 2027 | Under construction |
