= Oblivion (roller coaster) =

Steel dive roller coaster

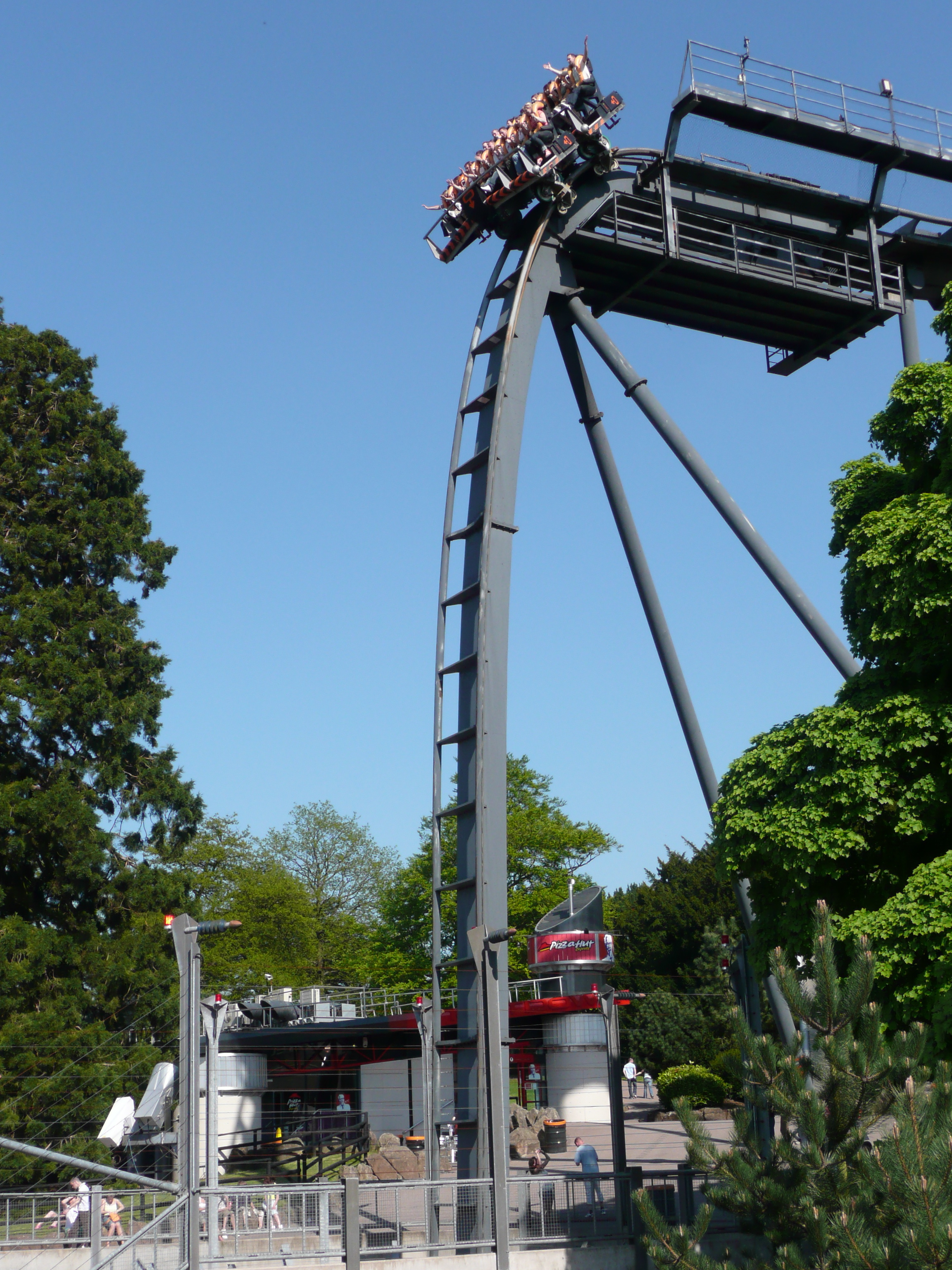
- Oblivion's near-vertical drop

Alton Towers
- Location: Alton Towers
- Park section: X-Sector
- Coordinates: 52.986575°N 1.896498°W
- Status: Operating
- Opening date: 14 March 1998
- Cost: £12 million

General statistics
- Type: Steel – Dive Coaster
- Manufacturer: Bolliger & Mabillard
- Designer: Werner Stengel
- Model: Dive Coaster
- Lift/launch system: Chain lift hill
- Height: 19.8 m (65 ft)
- Drop: 54.9 m (180 ft)
- Length: 372.5 m (1,222 ft)
- Speed: 109.4 km/h (68.0 mph)
- Inversions: 0
- Duration: 1:15
- Max vertical angle: 87.5°
- Capacity: 1,820 riders per hour
- G-force: 4.5
- Height restriction: 140 cm (4 ft 7 in)
- Trains: 7 trains with a single car; riders arranged 8 across in 2 rows for a total of 16 riders per train
- Website: Official website
- Slogan: "Don't Look Down"
- Fastrack available
- Single rider line available
- Oblivion at RCDB

Oblivion is a steel roller coaster at the Alton Towers theme park in Staffordshire, England. Marketed as the "world's first vertical drop roller coaster", it was manufactured by Bolliger & Mabillard as the first Dive Coaster.

Oblivion was constructed for a price of £12 million (equivalent to £23 million in 2025) beginning in 1997. Themed as a secretive facility, it was billed as an experience which had four stages, "physical trauma, psychological breakdown, the schizophrenic sequence, and finally chaos", reflected by screens placed in the ride's queue. Oblivion was promoted across multiple forms of media as part of its advertising campaign prior to the coaster opening on 14 March 1998.

Oblivion stands 19.8 metres (65 ft) tall and features a 55-metre-tall (180 ft) drop at an 87.5-degree angle into an underground tunnel, where riders reach a top speed of 109.4 kilometres per hour (68 mph) and experience 4.5 g. Its track is 372.5 metres (1,222 ft) long, and the ride lasts one minute and fifteen seconds.

Following Oblivion, Bolliger & Mabillard have constructed more than fifteen other Dive Coasters, including a mirror image of Oblivion – Diving Machine G5 at Janfusun Fancyworld.

== History ==
Throughout the 1997 season, the Fantasy World area was closed to the public – except Black Hole – in order for construction to begin on a new ride under the codename "SW4" ("Secret Weapon 4"). Signage posted on a fence surrounding the area stated, "World first ride opens [in] March 1998". Details about the attraction were not revealed until March 1998, when it was announced as "the world's first vertical drop ride" and the name Oblivion revealed.

Oblivion was constructed for a price of £12 million (equivalent to £23 million in 2025) by Bolliger & Mabillard with design work from Stengel Engineering. Greater than 300 people were involved in the ride's design, manufacturing, construction, marketing, and safety. The ride was constructed using 5,500 bolts, 40 track sections, and 20 support columns; the ride's steel weighed 42 metric tons (41 long tons; 46 short tons).

As part of the ride's promotional advertising, Oblivion was marketed as an experience that tests the "mind and body", broken down into four stages: "physical trauma, psychological breakdown, the schizophrenic sequence, and finally chaos". Oblivion opened to the public on 14 March 1998. Oblivion's opening was accompanied by a promotional campaign which included appearances on Blue Peter, news channels, and Corn Flakes cereal box packets. Prior to its opening, memorabilia including its own brand of deodorant was available to purchase.

Oblivion was themed as a secretive facility, with the surrounding Fantasy Land area redesigned as 'X-Sector' accordingly. This theme was previously considered for a planned pipeline coaster codenamed "Secret Weapon", which was later cancelled. The only attraction retained in the area was the Black Hole roller coaster, which was externally redesigned to suit the new theme. Alton Towers moved and rethemed two existing rides from other areas of the park to open with X-Sector, Energizer and Enterprise.

For a brief period in April 2011, the ride was sponsored by Fanta. However, much of the branding was removed after only a few months "following numerous complaints about the obtrusive nature of the brand".

On 8 May 2012, a reportedly suicidal 20-year-old man climbed over tall safety fencing and managed to access the underground ride area. He reportedly entered via the tunnel exit portal and walked underground, emerging on a ledge around the entrance portal. Neither he nor any guests on the ride were harmed. He was arrested for a public order offence and the ride returned to normal operation the following day.

== Ride experience ==
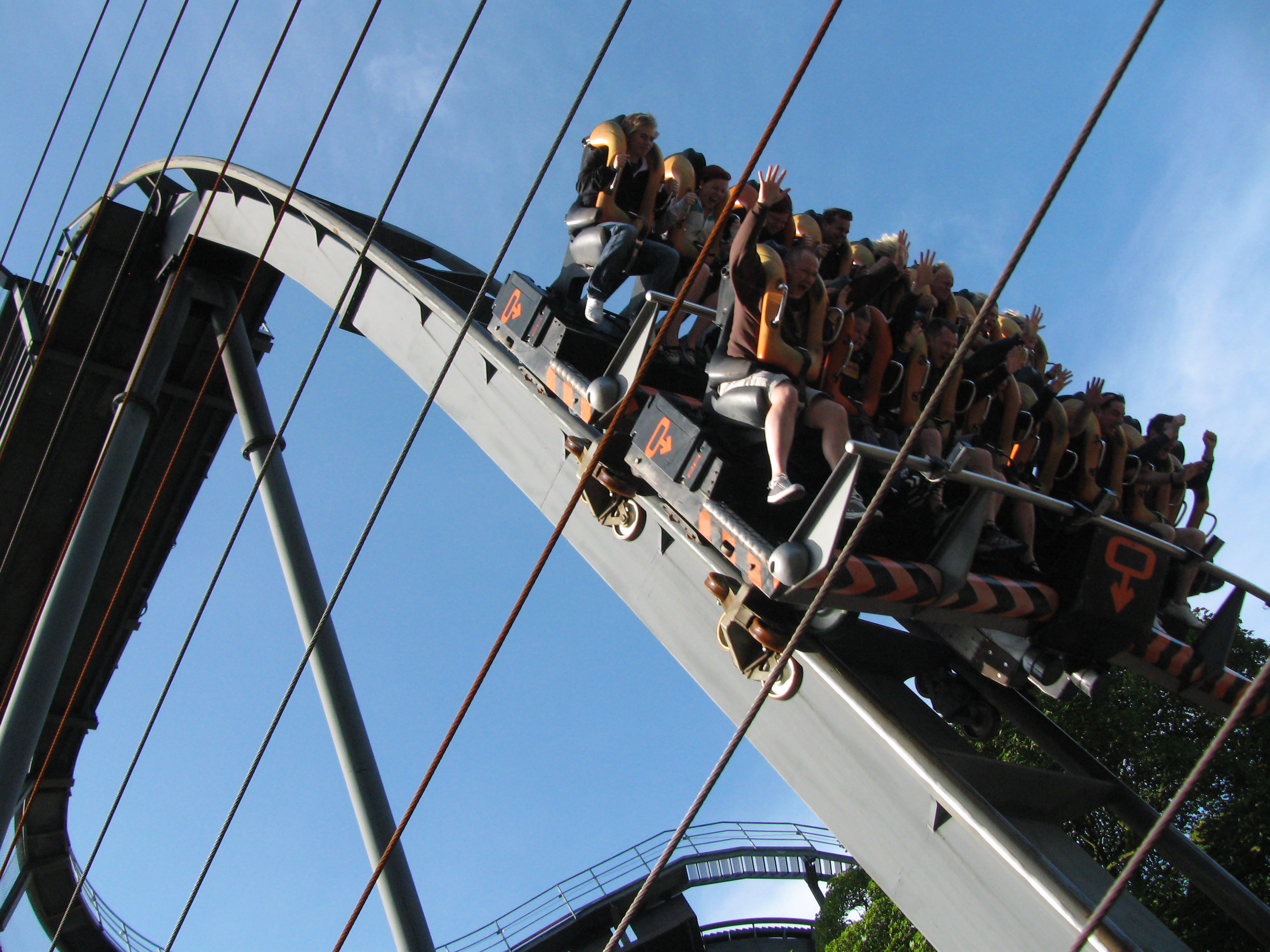
A picture of Oblivion's drop taken from the guest observation area.

Pre-ride videos are played throughout the ride's line queue featuring actor Renny Krupinski, who plays a character named the Lord of Darkness. Oblivion features seven single-car trains which each accommodate sixteen passengers in two rows of eight, allowing for a theoretical capacity of 1,820 riders per hour. The station has a dual-loading system, whereby two trains can be loaded simultaneously to speed up boarding.

After dispatching from the station, the train ascends a 18-metre (60 ft) chain lift hill at a 45-degree angle, then levels out and turns towards the drop. The car reaches the drop and pauses, facing over the edge for 3 seconds. Originally a voice intoning "Don't look down" was played before the car is released, but this was removed following a court order over noise issues in 2004. However, as of 24th April 2026, this voice line has been restored and now plays again.

The car is then released, dropping 55 metres (180 ft) at an 87.5 degree angle into an underground tunnel, where the ride reaches a top speed of 109 kilometres per hour (68 mph) and riders experience 4.5 g. Upon exiting the tunnel, a high-banked turn takes riders around into the brake run. There are two on-ride photos; one at the start of the drop and the other at the end of the high-banked turn. Oblivion's track is 372.5 metres (1,222 ft) long, and it has a ride time of one minute and fifteen seconds.

== Legacy ==
Oblivion is classified as the first Dive Coaster, a model from Bolliger & Mabillard, with a vertical angle of 87.5 degrees. The second Dive Coaster, Diving Machine G5, opened at Janfusun Fancyworld in 2000 with an 87.5 degree angle, a 179 ft drop, and a g-force of 5.0; it also featured a mirror of the layout of Oblivion. Five years later, SheiKra opened at Busch Gardens Tampa Bay as the first Dive Coaster with a 90 degree vertical drop and a splashdown element. In 2015, a ride named Oblivion: The Black Hole opened at Gardaland, becoming the first vertical drop roller coaster in Italy.
