= Krake =

Steel roller coaster at Heide Park

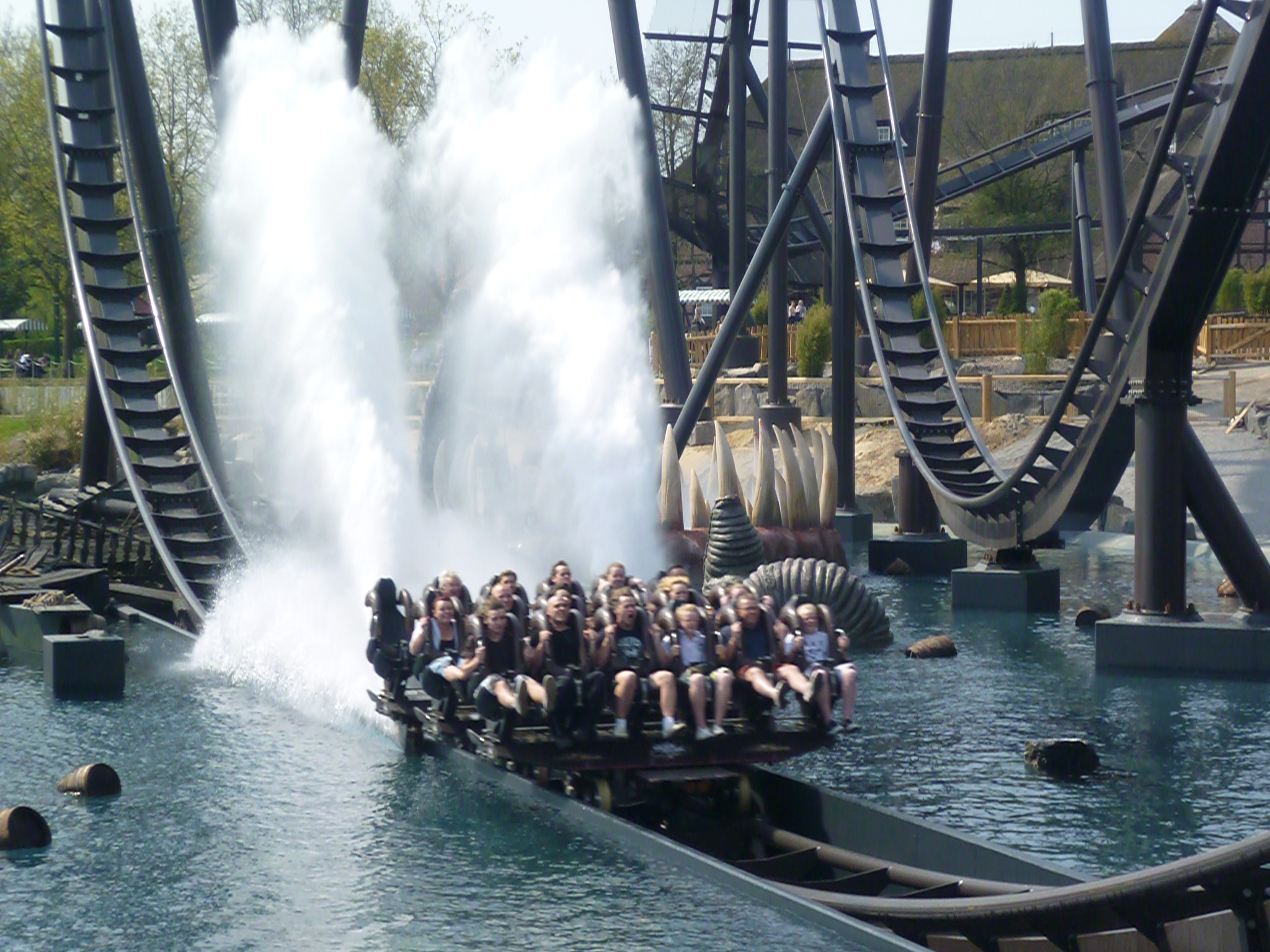
- One of Krake's trains in the splashdown element

Heide Park
- Location: Heide Park
- Coordinates: 53.024703°N 9.879049°E
- Status: Operating
- Opening date: April 16, 2011
- Cost: €12,000,000

General statistics
- Type: Steel – Dive Coaster
- Manufacturer: Bolliger & Mabillard
- Model: Dive Coaster
- Track layout: Out and back
- Lift/launch system: Chain lift hill
- Height: 41 m (135 ft)
- Length: 476 m (1,562 ft)
- Speed: 103 km/h (64 mph)
- Inversions: 1
- Duration: Under two minutes
- Max vertical angle: 87°
- Height restriction: 140 cm (4 ft 7 in)
- Trains: 3 trains with a single car; riders arranged 6 across in 3 rows for a total of 18 riders per train
- Krake at RCDB

Krake (German for "kraken") is a steel Dive Coaster roller coaster at Heide Park in Soltau, Lower Saxony, Germany manufactured by Bolliger & Mabillard. It is the first roller coaster of its kind in Germany. At a cost of 12 million euros, the roller coaster features floorless trains, 476 m (1,562 ft) of track, and a maximum height of 41 m (135 ft). The attraction officially opened to the public on April 16, 2011.

== History ==
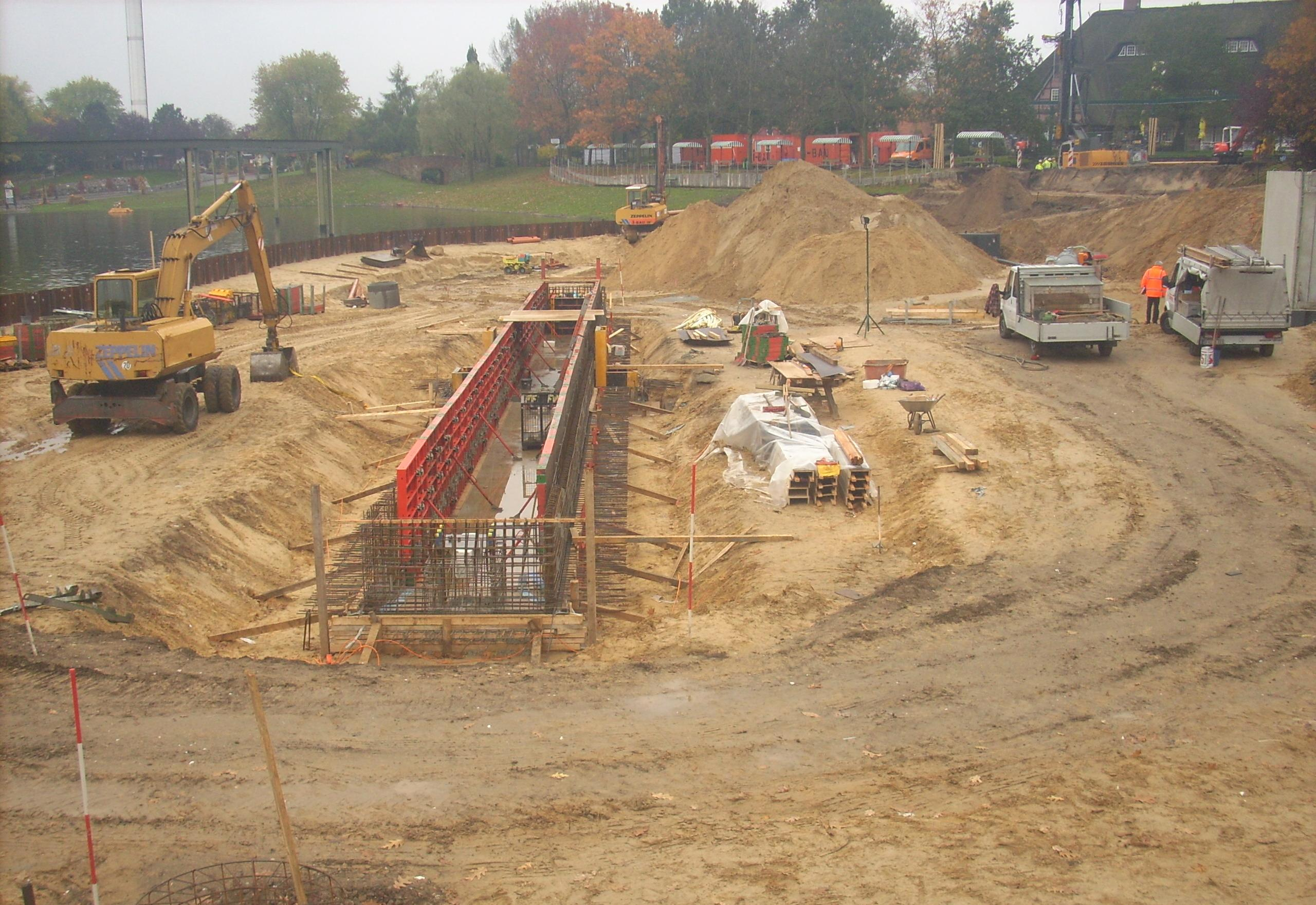
Krake's splashdown area during construction

Speculation that Heide Park would be getting a new roller coaster began in late 2009 after it was revealed that the park was working on a project code named "Ungetüm 2011" (translates to "Monster 2011"). In September 2010, track pieces from manufacture Bolliger & Mabillard began to be delivered to the park which then led to rumours that the new roller coaster would be a Dive Coaster. On October 31, 2010, Heide Park officially announced Germany's first Dive Coaster, Krake.

Construction was handled by RCS, a German construction company. Beginning with the splashdown area, construction later progressed into the Immelman loop and station areas. In late January 2011, the final piece of track (top of the first drop) was installed. After testing and a ribbon cutting ceremony, Krake opened on April 16, 2011.

After the original advertised octopus mouth (where riders would drop through) that was to be placed at the bottom of the first drop was never built, the public began to question why the park didn't follow through with what they advertised. In response, the mouth was constructed during the following off-season.

== Experience ==
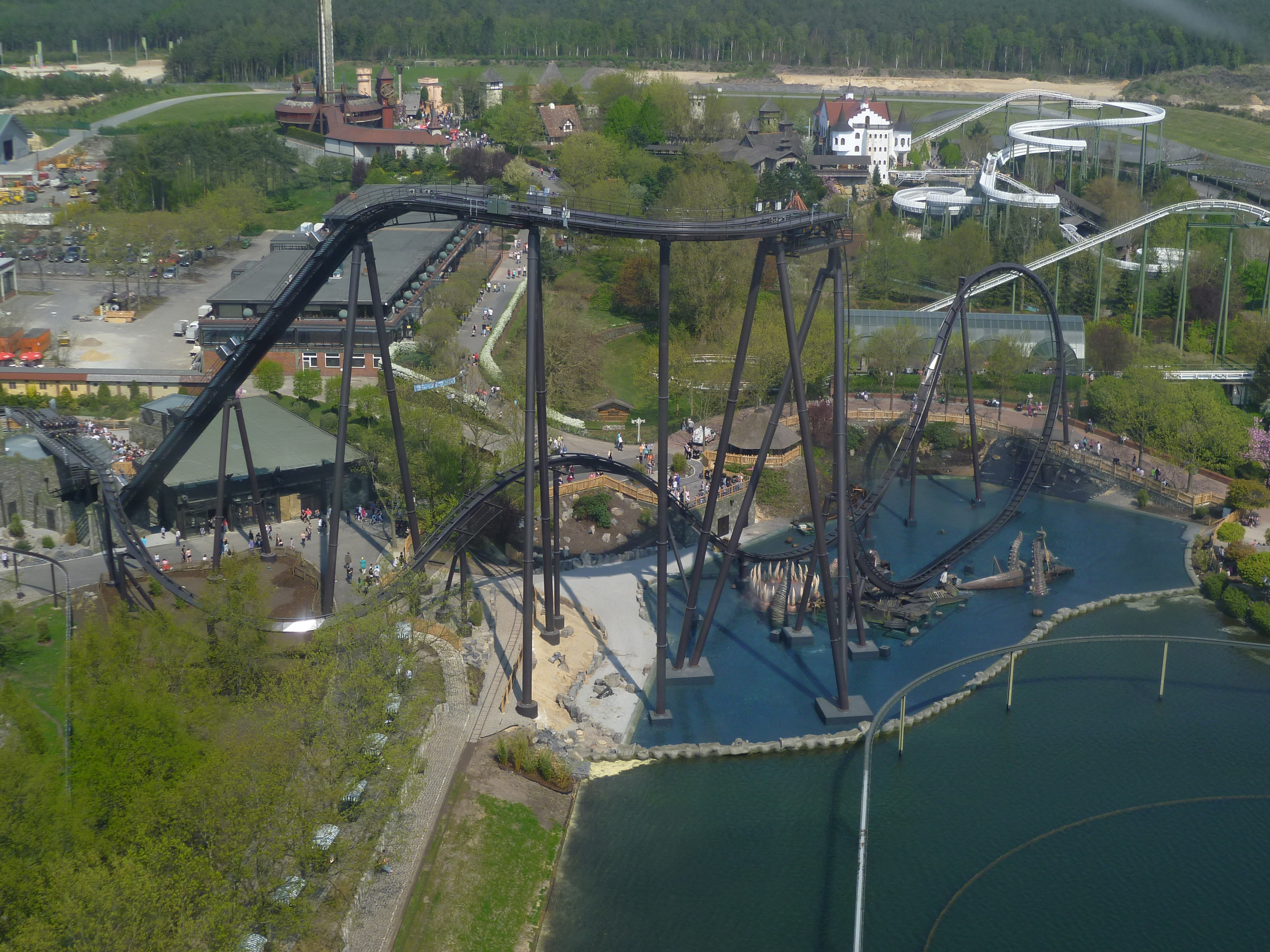
Aerial view

=== Queue ===
Krake's queue is divided into two sections. The first section is only used during busier days and isn't paved, but rather filled in with gravel. The second section is a paved path that leads the roller coaster's station.

=== Ride ===
Krake is based on a pirate theme and features riders being "eaten" by an octopus.

Once the floor drops and the front gate opens, the train is dispatched straight into the 41-metre (135 ft) lift hill. Once at the top, the train continues going straight for a short period before making a left turn into the holding brake. After about three seconds, the train descends the 87-degree drop and reaches a speed of 103 km/h (64 mph). At the bottom, the train enters the "monster's" mouth, followed by a splashdown. Then, the train goes through an Immelmann loop. After going over an airtime hill, the train makes a banked right turn into the final brake run. The train makes a left turn into the brake run before entering the station. One cycle lasts just under two minutes.

== Characteristics ==
=== Track ===
The steel track of Krake is approximately 476 m (1,562 ft) long, and the height of the lift is approximately 41 m (135 ft) high. The colour of the track is black while the supports are dark brown. Also, the entire track weighs a total of about 700 tonnes (690 long tons; 770 short tons).

=== Trains ===
Krake operates with three floorless steel and fiberglass trains. Each train has three cars that can seat six riders in a single row for a total of 18 riders per train. The seats are black and each have a brown over-the-shoulder restraint. On each train, there are a pair of tubes that allow the water to be shot into the air as the train reaches the bottom of the first drop. Also, the trains for the roller coaster were manufactured in Switzerland.

== Reception ==
Mitch Hawker's Best Roller Coaster Poll: Best steel-Tracked Roller Coaster
Year	2011	2012	2013
Ranking	No poll	118	147

The roller coaster has never placed in Amusement Today's Golden Ticket Awards.

== See also ==
- 2011 in amusement parks
