= Dive Coaster (Chimelong Paradise) =

Amusement ride in Guangzhou, China

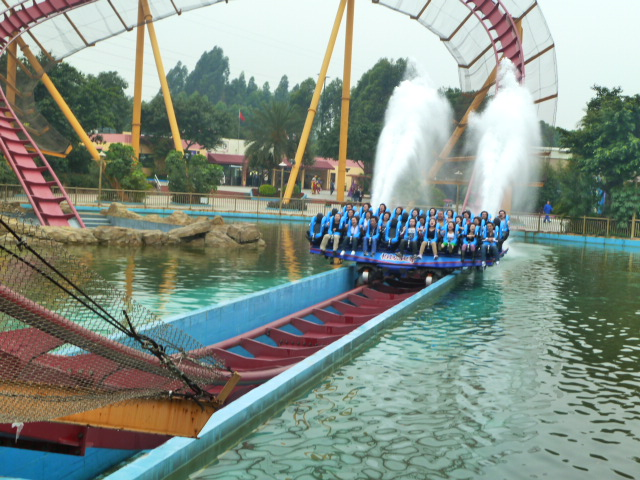

Chimelong Paradise
- Location: Chimelong Paradise
- Park section: Rainbow Bay
- Coordinates: 22.999647°N 113.323256°E
- Status: Removed
- Opening date: January 21, 2008
- Closing date: December 21, 2025

General statistics
- Type: Steel – Dive Coaster
- Manufacturer: Bolliger & Mabillard
- Model: Floorless Dive Coaster
- Lift/launch system: Chain lift hill
- Height: 59.9 m (197 ft)
- Length: 981 m (3,219 ft)
- Speed: 112 km/h (70 mph)
- Inversions: 1
- Max vertical angle: 90°
- Height restriction: 140 cm (4 ft 7 in)
- Dive Coaster at RCDB

Dive Coaster is a floorless steel Dive coaster roller coaster at the Chimelong Paradise amusement park in Panyu District, Guangzhou, Guangdong, China. Built by Bolliger & Mabillard at a cost of over CN¥200 million (US$27 million), the ride opened on 21 January 2008.

== History ==
Dive Coaster was built by Swiss roller coaster manufacturer Bolliger & Mabillard at a cost of over CN¥200 million (US$27 million). The ride opened to the public on 21 January 2008.

In March 2025, Chimelong Paradise stated that Dive Coaster would be demolished in the coming months. On December 21, the Dive Coaster temporarily closed to the public. The park held a closing ceremony for the ride, which roller coaster enthusiasts and representatives of the general public were invited to. The ride's closure allowed for its relocation within the park to the former site of 10 Inversion Roller Coaster, which closed on December 7.

== Ride experience ==
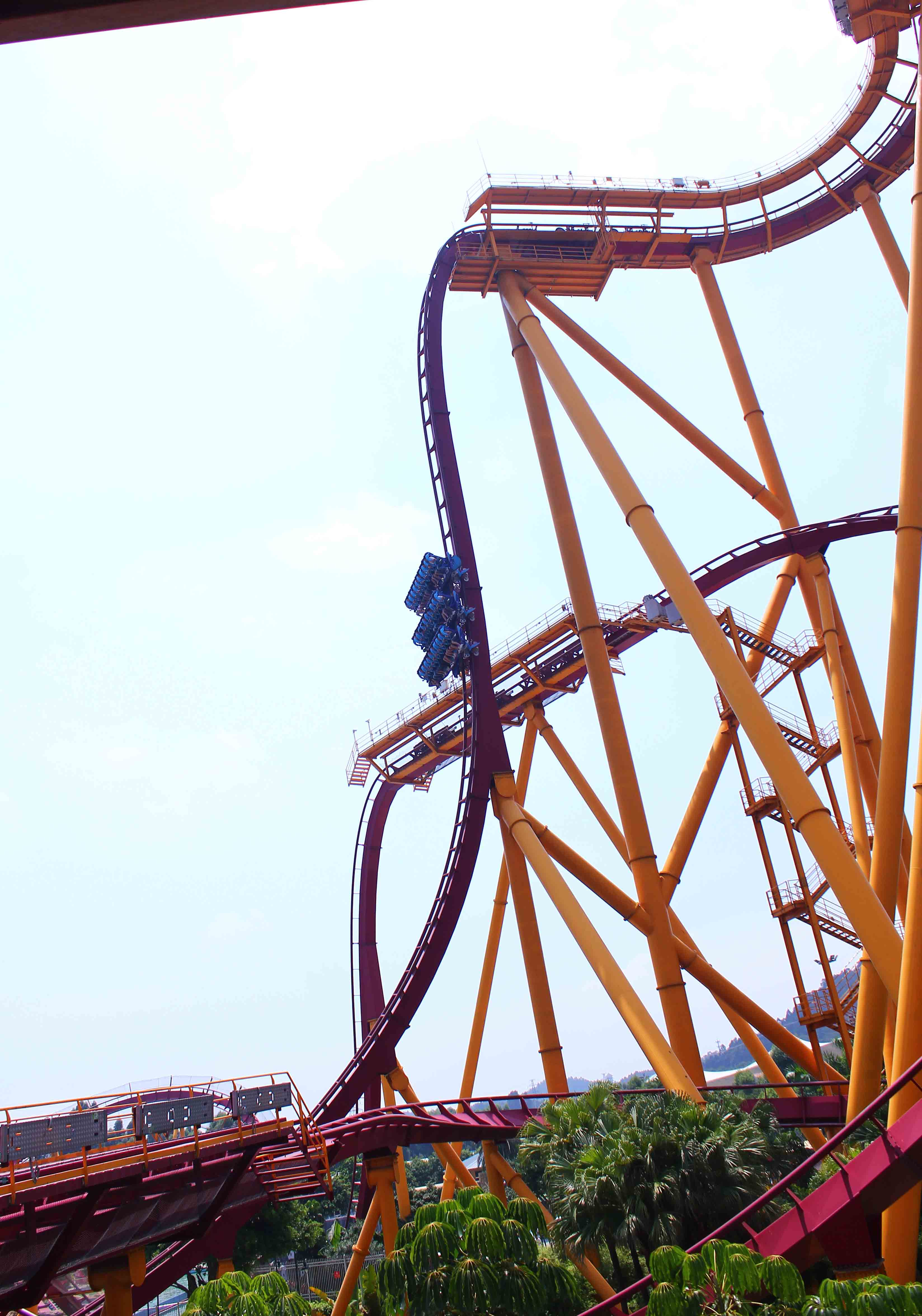
Dive Coaster in July 2011

Dive Coaster features a 90-degree, 60-metre-tall (197 ft) vertical drop that exits into an Immelmann loop. After the Immelmann, riders swoop down to the ground then climb a curve up to the block brake, before going over a second near vertical dive dropping into a tunnel. Upon exiting the tunnel, riders make an overbanked turn into a water splash feature which exits into a bunny hill then into a helix before entering the final brake run.
