= Dive Coaster =

Roller coaster model

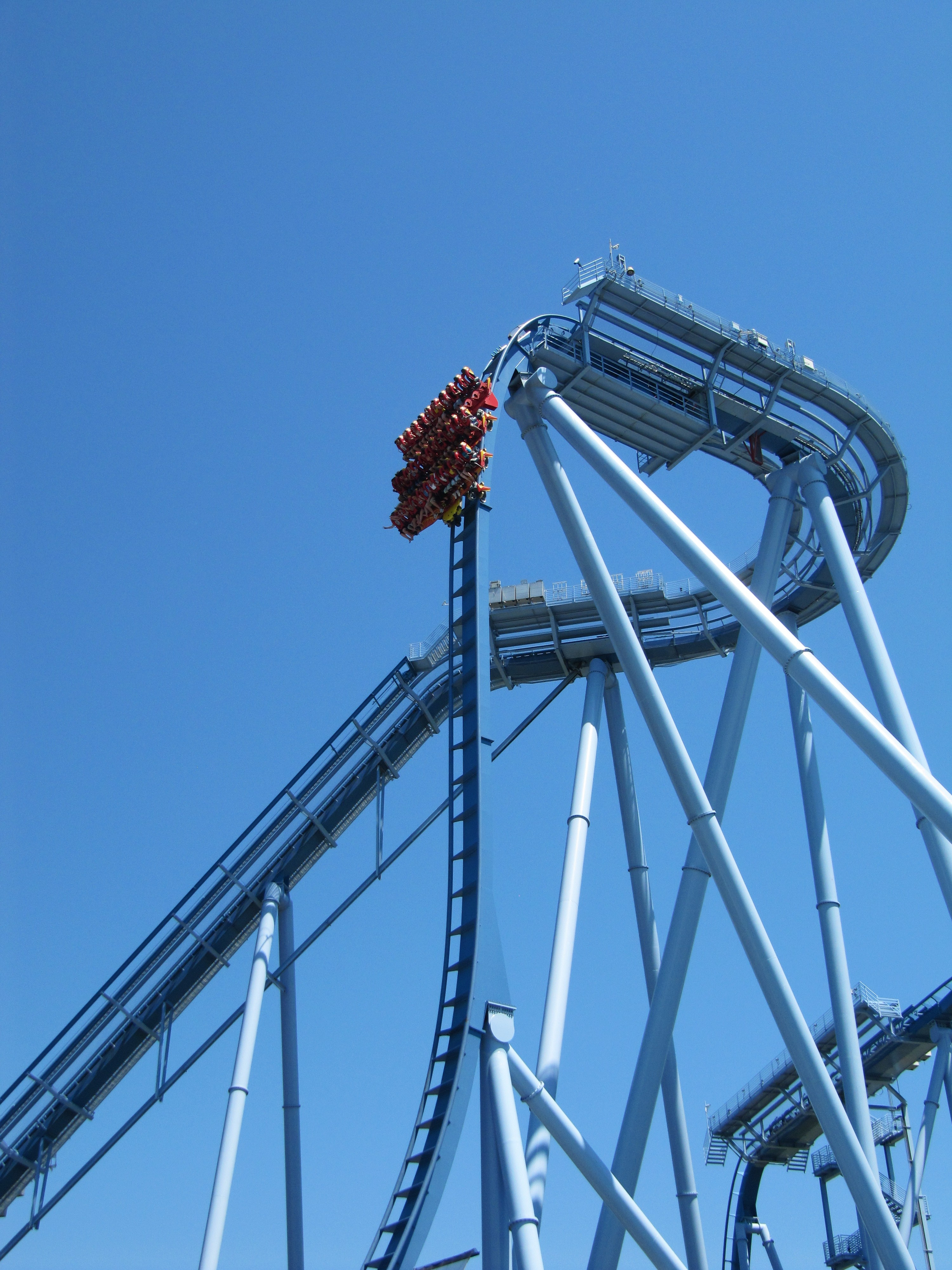
- Griffon, Busch Gardens Williamsburg
- Status: In production
- First manufactured: 1998
- No. of installations: 19 (18 operating)
- Manufacturer: Bolliger & Mabillard
- Vehicle type: Floorless or normal seats located above the track
- Rows: 2/3
- Riders per row: 6/7/8/10
- Restraint Style: Over-the-shoulder/Vest restraint
- Dive Coaster at RCDB

The Dive Coaster is a steel roller coaster model developed and engineered by Bolliger & Mabillard. The design features one or more near- or beyond-vertical drops ranging from 87° to 96° steep, which provides a moment of free-falling for passengers. The experience is enhanced by unique trains that seat up to ten riders per row, spanning only two or three rows total. Unlike traditional train design, this distinguishing aspect gives all passengers virtually the same experience throughout the course of the ride. Another defining characteristic of Dive Coasters is the holding brake at the top of the lift hill that holds the train momentarily right as it enters the first drop, suspending some passengers with a view looking straight down and releasing suddenly moments later.

Development of the Dive Coaster began between 1994 and 1995 with Oblivion at Alton Towers opening on 14 March 1998, making it the world's first Dive Coaster. The trains for this type of coaster are relatively short consisting of two to three cars. B&M also uses floorless trains on this model to enhance the experience.

As of July 2026, nineteen Dive Coasters have been built, with the newest being Tormenta Rampaging Run at Six Flags Over Texas. Tormenta Rampaging Run is currently the world's tallest, longest, and fastest Dive Coaster, featuring a height of 94.2 m (309 ft), a length of 1,280 m (4,200 ft), and a maximum speed of 140 km/h (87 mph).

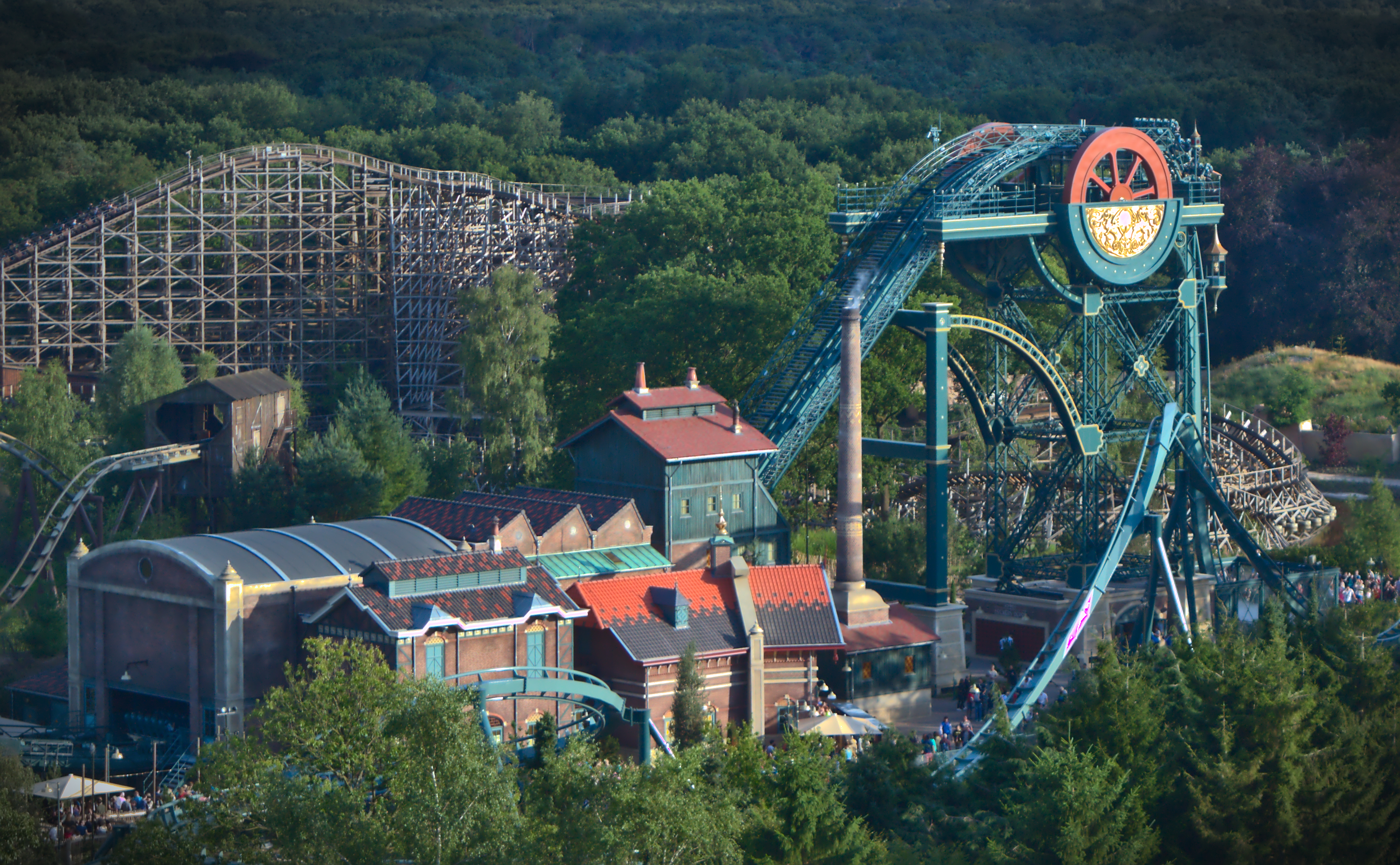
Baron 1898, a themed dive coaster at Efteling in The Netherlands

== History ==
According to Walter Bolliger, development of the Dive Coaster began between 1994 and 1995. On 14 March 1998, the world's first Dive Coaster, Oblivion, opened at Alton Towers. Though Oblivion is classified as a Dive Coaster, it does not have a true vertical drop as the drop angle is only 87-degrees. Two years later, the second Dive Coaster built, Diving Machine G5, opened at Janfusun Fancyworld and also technically does not have a true vertical drop. In 2005, SheiKra opened at Busch Gardens Tampa Bay and was the first Dive Coaster to feature a 90-degree drop and a splashdown element. In 2007, Busch Gardens Williamsburg announced that Griffon would be the first ever Dive Coaster to feature floorless trains and SheiKra would have its trains replaced with floorless ones. In 2011, the first 'mini' Dive Coaster opened at Heide Park Resort, named Krake. Unlike other Dive Coasters, Krake has smaller trains consisting of three rows of six riders. In 2019, Yukon Striker at Canada's Wonderland was the first Dive Coaster to feature a vertical loop, allowing it to have the most inversions on a Dive Coaster with four at the time. On 30 July 2022, Dr. Diabolical’s Cliffhanger opened at Six Flags Fiesta Texas as the first B&M Dive Coaster to feature a beyond vertical 95-degree drop and 7-across seating. On 31 May 2025, Wrath of Rakshasa opened at Six Flags Great America and broke the record for the steepest beyond vertical 96-degree drop and the most inversions on any dive coaster with five in total.

== Design ==
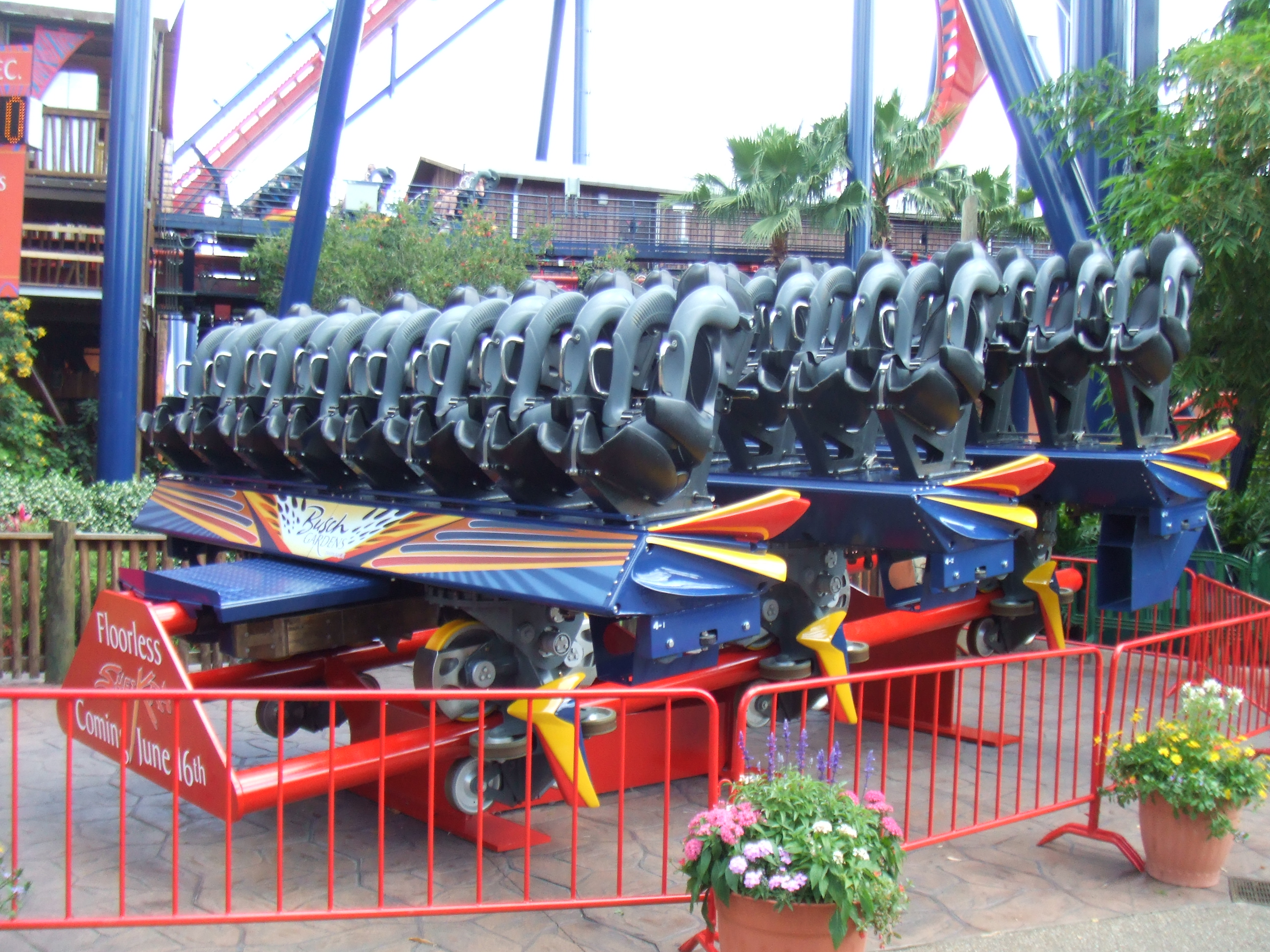
An example of a floorless Dive Coaster train on SheiKra

The design of a Dive Coaster can vary slightly from one to another. Depending on the amusement park's request, one row on the train can seat anywhere from 6 to 10 riders. Stadium seating is also used to give every rider a clear view. Next, compared to standard Bolliger & Mabillard 4 abreast cars, because of the extra weight of each train on a Dive Coaster, the size of the track must be larger than other B&M models (such as the Hyper Coaster) to support the weight. At the top of the primary vertical drop, a braking system holds the train for 3 to 5 seconds, giving riders a view of the drop ahead before being released into the drop.

In the station, Dive Coasters that use non-floorless trains simply use a standard station. With Dive Coasters that use floorless trains, in order to allow riders to load and unload the train, a movable floor is necessary. Because the front row has nothing in front of it to stop riders from walking over the edge of the station, a gate is placed in front of the train to prevent this from happening. Once all the over-the-shoulder restraints are locked, the gate opens and the floor separates into several pieces and moves underneath the station. When the next train enters the station, the gate is closed and the floors are brought back up where the next riders board.

== Installations ==
Bolliger & Mabillard has built nineteen Dive Coasters as of 2026.

Name	Park	Country	Train Width	Train Type	Model	Opened	Status
Oblivion	Alton Towers	United Kingdom	8 seats	Standard	Wide	14 March 1998	Operating
Diving Machine G5	Janfusun Fancyworld	Taiwan	8 seats	Standard	Wide	29 March 2000	Operating
SheiKra	Busch Gardens Tampa Bay	United States	8 seats	Floorless (Originally Standard)	Wide	21 May 2005	Operating
Griffon	Busch Gardens Williamsburg	United States	10 seats	Floorless	Wide	18 May 2007	Operating
Dive Coaster	Chimelong Paradise	China	10 seats	Floorless	Wide	21 January 2008	Being relocated
Diving Coaster	Happy Valley Shanghai	China	10 seats	Floorless	Wide	16 August 2009	Operating
Krake	Heide Park	Germany	6 seats	Floorless	Narrow	16 April 2011	Operating
Oblivion: The Black Hole	Gardaland	Italy	6 seats	Floorless	Narrow	28 March 2015	Operating
Baron 1898	Efteling	Netherlands	6 seats	Floorless	Narrow	1 July 2015	Operating
Valravn	Cedar Point	United States	8 seats	Floorless	Wide	7 May 2016	Operating
Flying Apsaras in Western Region	Happy Valley Chengdu	China	6 seats	Floorless	Narrow	10 February 2018	Operating
Draken	Gyeongju World	South Korea	8 seats	Floorless	Wide	1 May 2018	Operating
Valkyria	Liseberg	Sweden	6 seats	Floorless	Narrow	10 August 2018	Operating
Yukon Striker	Canada's Wonderland	Canada	8 seats	Floorless	Wide	3 May 2019	Operating
Emperor	SeaWorld San Diego	United States	6 seats	Floorless	Narrow	12 March 2022	Operating
Dr. Diabolical’s Cliffhanger	Six Flags Fiesta Texas	United States	7 seats	Floorless	Narrow	30 July 2022	Operating
Iron Menace	Dorney Park & Wildwater Kingdom	United States	7 seats	Floorless	Narrow	10 May 2024	Operating
Wrath of Rakshasa	Six Flags Great America	United States	7 seats	Floorless	Narrow	31 May 2025	Operating
Tormenta Rampaging Run	Six Flags Over Texas	United States	8 seats	Floorless	Wide	9 July 2026	Operating

== Similar coasters ==
In 2018, Golden Horse, a Chinese amusement ride manufacturer infamous for creating knock-off coasters and rides, installed a Dive Coaster at Great Xingdong Tourist World. The trains contain four cars, each seating 6 riders per row, compared to B&M dive coasters, which have two or three cars per train.

On 18 May 2018, HangTime, a Gerstlauer roller coaster, opened at Knott's Berry Farm in Buena Park, California, marketing as "the first dive coaster on the West Coast".

== See also ==
- Floorless Coaster, a type of roller coaster also designed by Bolliger & Mabillard, that features floorless trains.
- Gerstlauer Euro-Fighter, a roller coaster with a beyond-vertical drop, which reaches an angle greater than 90 degrees.
