= Dr. Diabolical's Cliffhanger =

Roller coaster at Six Flags Fiesta Texas

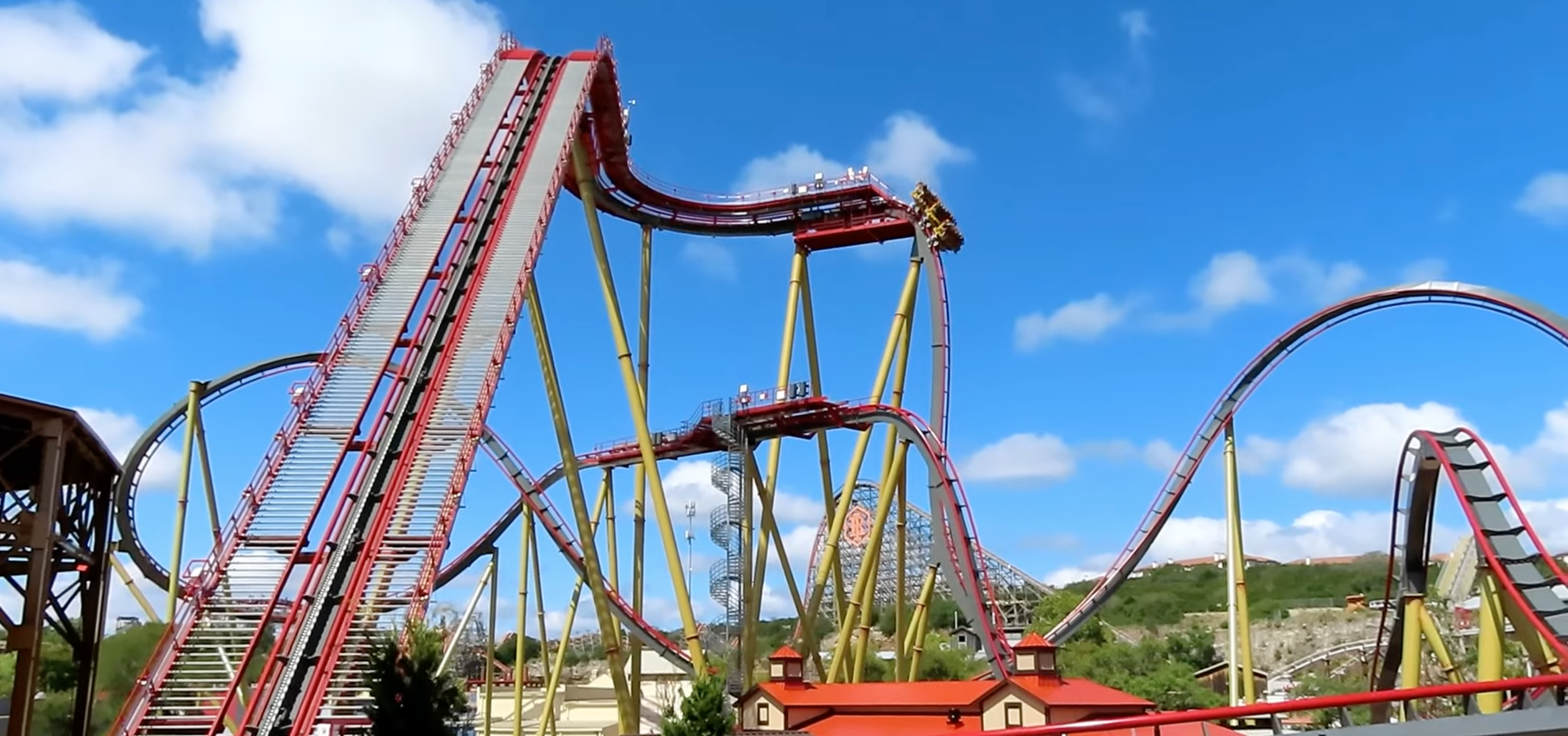
- Dr. Diabolical's Cliffhanger's lift hill and drop

Six Flags Fiesta Texas
- Location: Six Flags Fiesta Texas
- Park section: Crackaxle Canyon
- Coordinates: 29.5981°N 98.6117°W
- Status: Operating
- Soft opening date: July 29, 2022
- Opening date: July 30, 2022
- Replaced: Sundance Theatre

General statistics
- Type: Steel – Dive
- Manufacturer: Bolliger & Mabillard
- Model: Dive Coaster
- Lift/launch system: Chain lift hill
- Height: 150 ft (46 m)
- Drop: 142 ft (43 m)
- Length: 2,501 ft (762 m)
- Speed: 60 mph (97 km/h)
- Inversions: 2
- Max vertical angle: 95°
- Height restriction: 48–78 in (122–198 cm)
- Trains: 3 trains with 3 cars. Riders are arranged 7 across in a single row for a total of 21 riders per train.
- Fast Lane available
- Dr. Diabolical's Cliffhanger at RCDB

Dr. Diabolical's Cliffhanger is a steel roller coaster at Six Flags Fiesta Texas in San Antonio, Texas. Located in the Crackaxle Canyon section, it was designed as a dive coaster model and was manufactured by Bolliger & Mabillard. It opened on July 30, 2022, replacing the Sundance Theatre. From its opening in 2022 to 2025, it held the record for having the steepest drop on any Dive Coaster model, before it was surpassed by Wrath of Rakshasa.

== History ==
On June 12, 2021, Six Flags Fiesta Texas held the "Roller Coaster Rodeo." At the event, the park started teasing their new attraction. Additionally, the park also confirmed the removal of the Sundance Theatre for the upcoming attraction on June 14, 2021. The Sundance Theatre was an original theatre venue that opened with the park in 1992.

On July 28, 2021, Six Flags Fiesta Texas announced Dr. Diabolical's Cliffhanger for the 30th anniversary of the park in 2022. The ride was originally intended for Six Flags Great America in Gurnee, Illinois, but was given to Six Flags Fiesta Texas instead built because Great America sought plans to build a larger Dive Coaster.

In November 2021, the first concrete footers were poured. On February 5, 2022, the ride's lift hill was officially topped off. Soft opening for the roller coaster began on July 29, 2022 for season pass holders and the news media. The roller coaster officially opened to the public on July 30, 2022 with a grand opening ceremony. Its opening marked the first Six Flags park to receive a B&M since X-Flight at Six Flags Great America. It opened as the steepest Dive Coaster at 95 degrees before it was surpassed by Wrath of Rakshasa at Six Flags Great America in 2025.

== Ride experience ==
Located in the park's Crackaxle Canyon themed area of the park, Dr. Diabolical's Cliffhanger is 150 feet (46 m) in height, reaches a maximum speed of 60 miles per hour (97 km/h), and a track length of 2,501 feet (762 m). The roller coaster features a 95-degree (a beyond vertical drop), as well as a second 75-foot (23 m), near-vertical drop.

=== Theme ===
As guests enter the queue line for the roller coaster, they will find themselves immersed in the story of Dr. Diabolical and her evil quest to create menacing creatures to frighten the world. To bring her creations to life, she has constructed a machine to capture the essence of human adrenaline and fear.
