= Baron 1898 =

Rollercoaster in the Efteling theme park

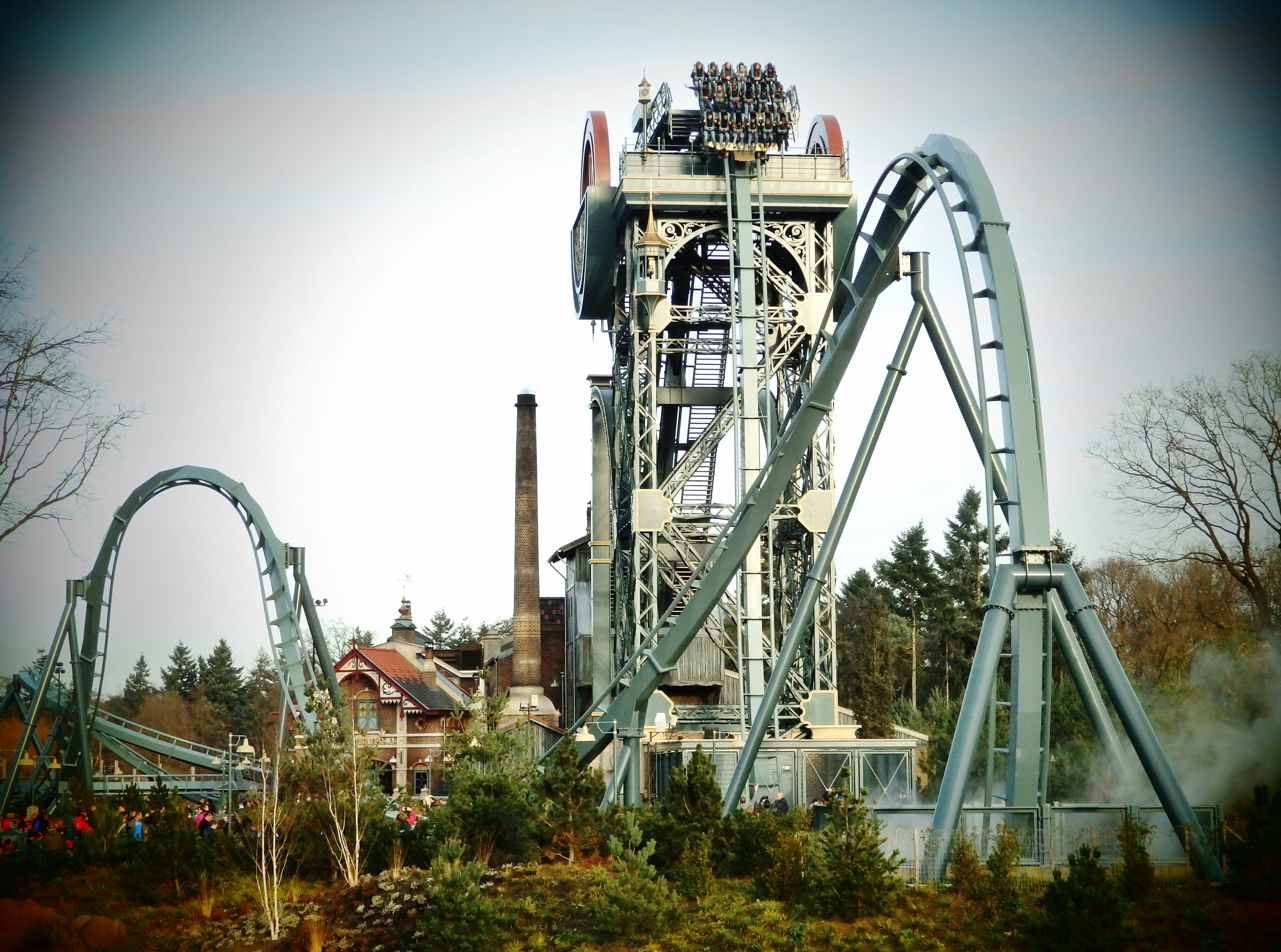
- Overview of the attraction.

Efteling
- Location: Efteling
- Coordinates: 51.648168°N 5.050830°E
- Status: Operating
- Opening date: July 1, 2015
- Cost: € 18 million

General statistics
- Type: Steel – Dive Coaster
- Manufacturer: Bolliger & Mabillard
- Model: Dive Coaster
- Lift/launch system: Chain lift hill
- Height: 30 m (98 ft)
- Drop: 37.5 m (123 ft)
- Length: 501 m (1,644 ft)
- Speed: 90 km/h (56 mph)
- Inversions: 2
- Duration: 130 seconds
- Max vertical angle: 90°
- Capacity: 1000 riders per hour
- G-force: 3
- Height restriction: 52 in (132 cm)
- Trains: 3 trains with 3 cars; riders arranged 6 across in a single row for a total of 18 riders per train
- Single rider line available
- Baron 1898 at RCDB

Video

Baron 1898 is a Dive Coaster produced by the Swiss manufacturer Bolliger & Mabillard located in Efteling in Kaatsheuvel, The Netherlands. It opened on July 1, 2015. The coaster's soundtrack was composed by René Merkelbach and performed by the Brussels Philharmonic Orchestra.

== Story ==
In 1898, the wealthy baron Gustave Hooghmoed (whose last name is a variation on the Dutch word for hubris) is led to discover a nearby cave that is rich in gold deposits by spirits known as the Witte Wieven ("Wise women", "Dames Blanches", "White Women" or "White ladies"); however, these spirits give Hooghmoed the admonition that if he disturbs the gold in any way, he will suffer terrible consequences for the remainder of his life. In an attempt to circumvent the spirits' threat, Hooghmoed presses the destitute locals into working in his newly opened gold mine, where many of the workers suffer catastrophic accidents or are chased out of the cave by the "Witte Wieven" and their supernatural cohorts.

After the Baron is called out of his office to tend to an emergency in the mine shaft, mine overseer Laars will help guests into his specially designed mine elevator vehicles that are capable of traveling both vertically and horizontally. After the guests board the special mine cars, Laars and the machine shop are suddenly attacked by vengeful spirits of miners who have previously vanished under the influence of the "Witte Wieven". Before Laars's office apparently explodes, he sends the miners out of the mine; as the car ascends, a giant fireball bursts from the opening of the machine shop and almost reaches the rear car of the train. As the train is about to leave the mine, it stops as the "Witte Wieven" can be heard singing from the pit, from which smoke pours and lights can be seen. After a few seconds, the "Witte Wieven" scream, "You shall not evade my curse! Prepare to forfeit your lives!" as the miners plunge down the exit of the mine.

== Personnel ==
- Story/Plot - Jacques Vriens
- Music - Brussels Philharmonie
- Composer - René Merkelbach
- Vocals - Paul van Gorcum (Baron Gustave Hooghmoed)
- Vocals - Anneke van Giersbergen (the Witte Wieven)
- Construction - Bolliger & Mabillard
- Head of engineering - Mark Jansen
- Designer - Sander de Bruijn

== Ride ==
Guests to the Efteling theme park take on the role of one of Hooghmoed's employees; the queue begins with guests crossing an iron bridge over a creek to the mine's central offices and barracks, where guests will have an audience with the headstrong Baron who will, via an application of projections and animatronics, give his newly minted employees a brief safety lecture before sternly warning them against believing in the legend of the "Witte Wieven". Guests will move on from the office into the mine's machinery and maintenance shop to board the special mine cars. The spirits suddenly attack the cars; this effect is achieved through projection technology and animatronics (projected ghosts fly over rider's heads, and several pipes seem to burst.) As the train is about to drop off the lift, it stops as the "Witte Wieven" can be heard wailing from the pit, visually indicated by smoke. After a few seconds, the riders plunge 37.5 meters into said smoke-filled pit, and pull out into an Immelmann loop. Riders enter a zero-g roll before traveling through a fast-paced 360° Helix, quickly followed by a small bunnyhop. The final brake run follows, leading into the mine complex's equipment storage area where guests disembark.

The exit hallway is still themed and leads to a cafe named 't Melkhuisje (literally the milkhouse). This is due to a tradition in which miners would generally have a glass of milk after hours of labor work in the mines.

Baron 1898's track was fabricated in the United States, while its replica mine shaft was produced in Hungary.

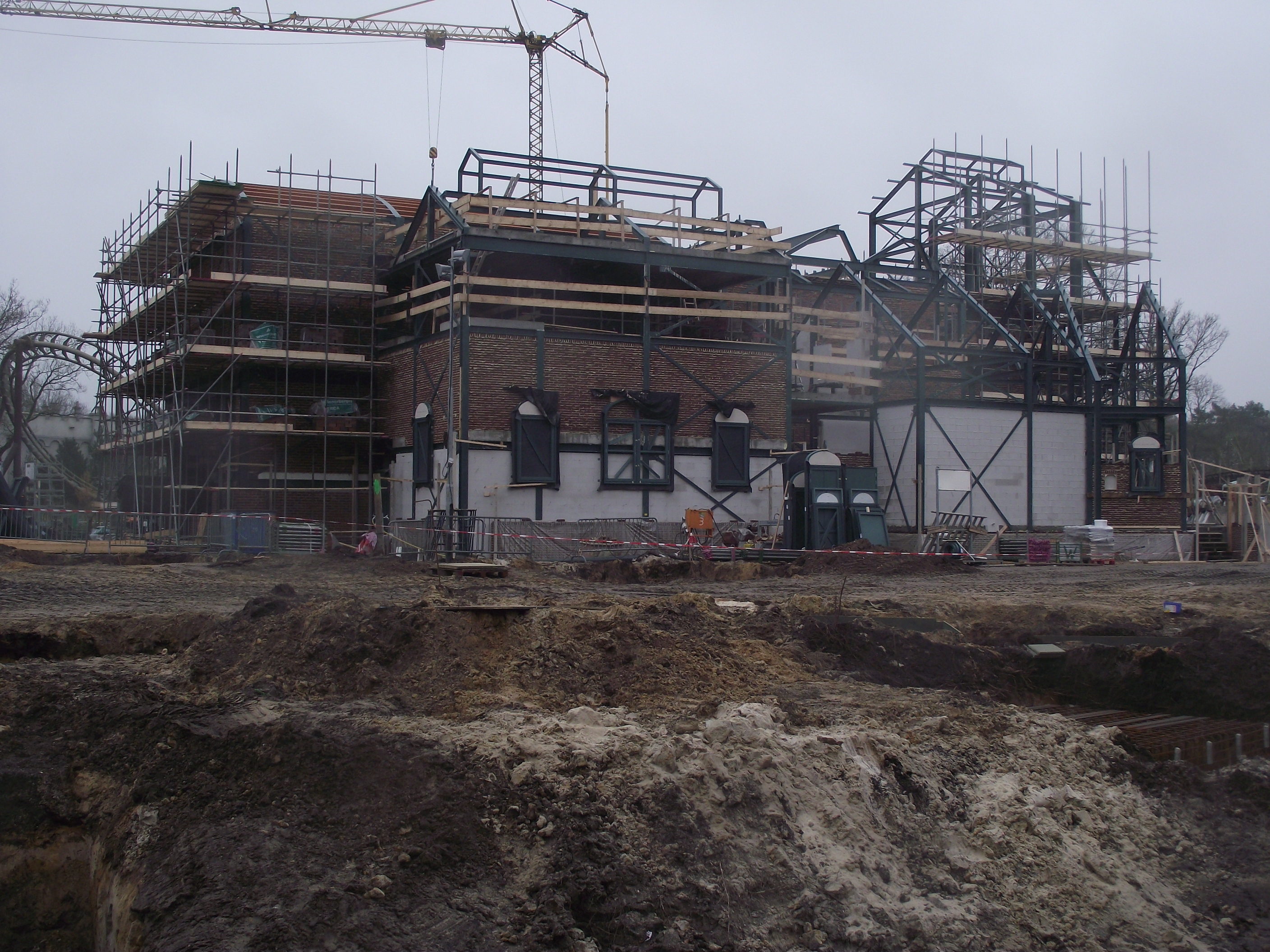
December 2014.

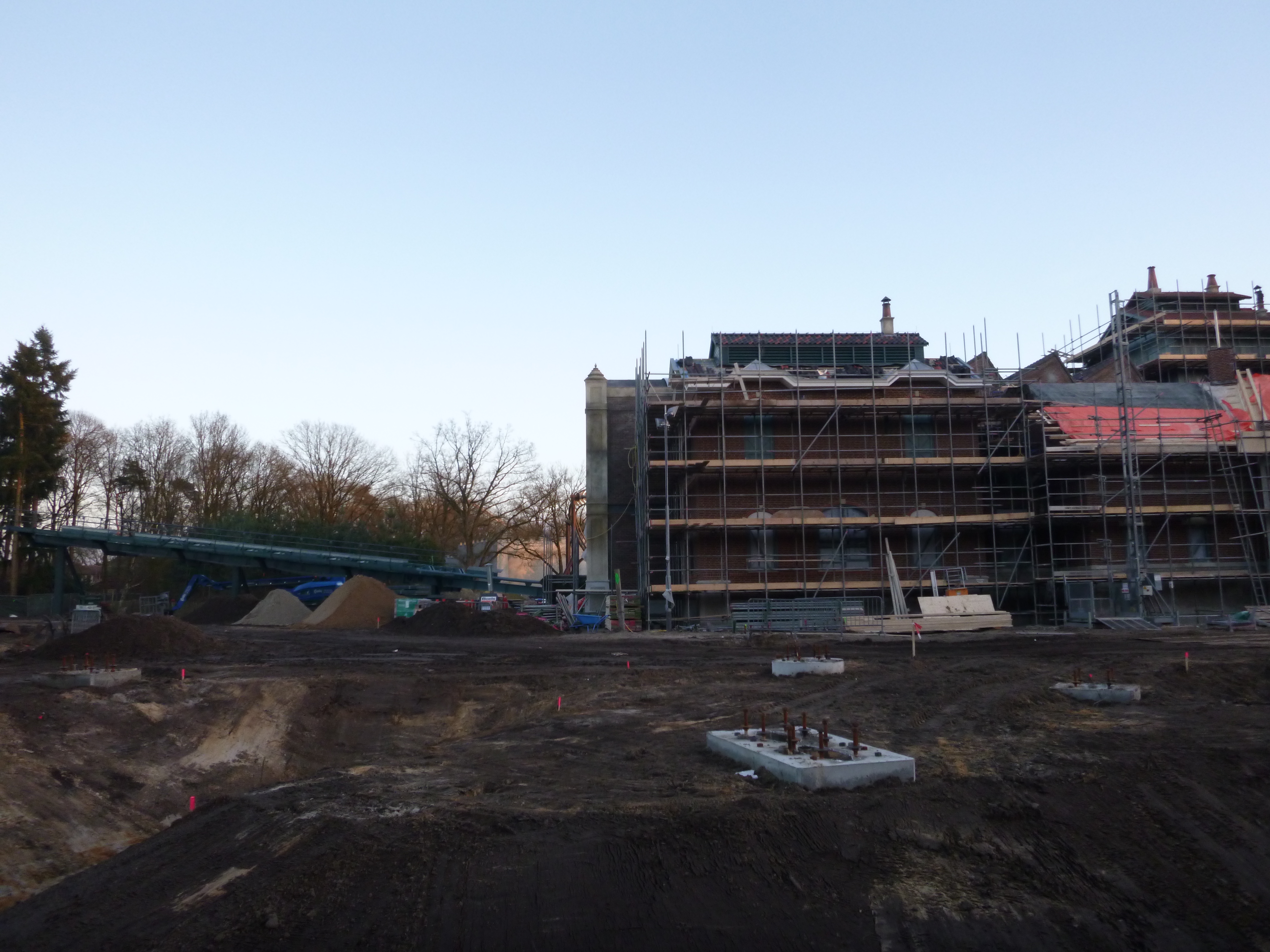
February 2015.

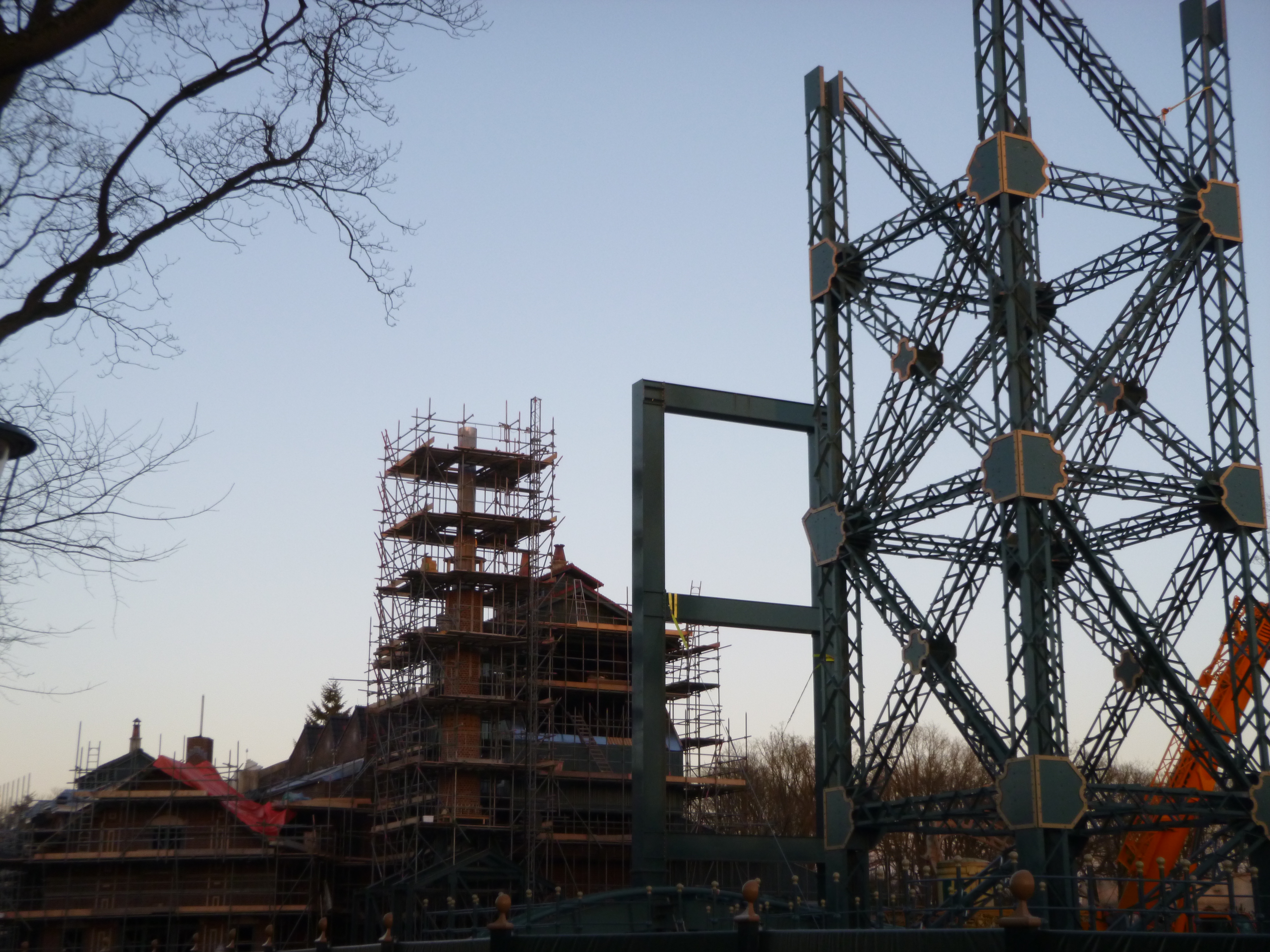
February 2015.

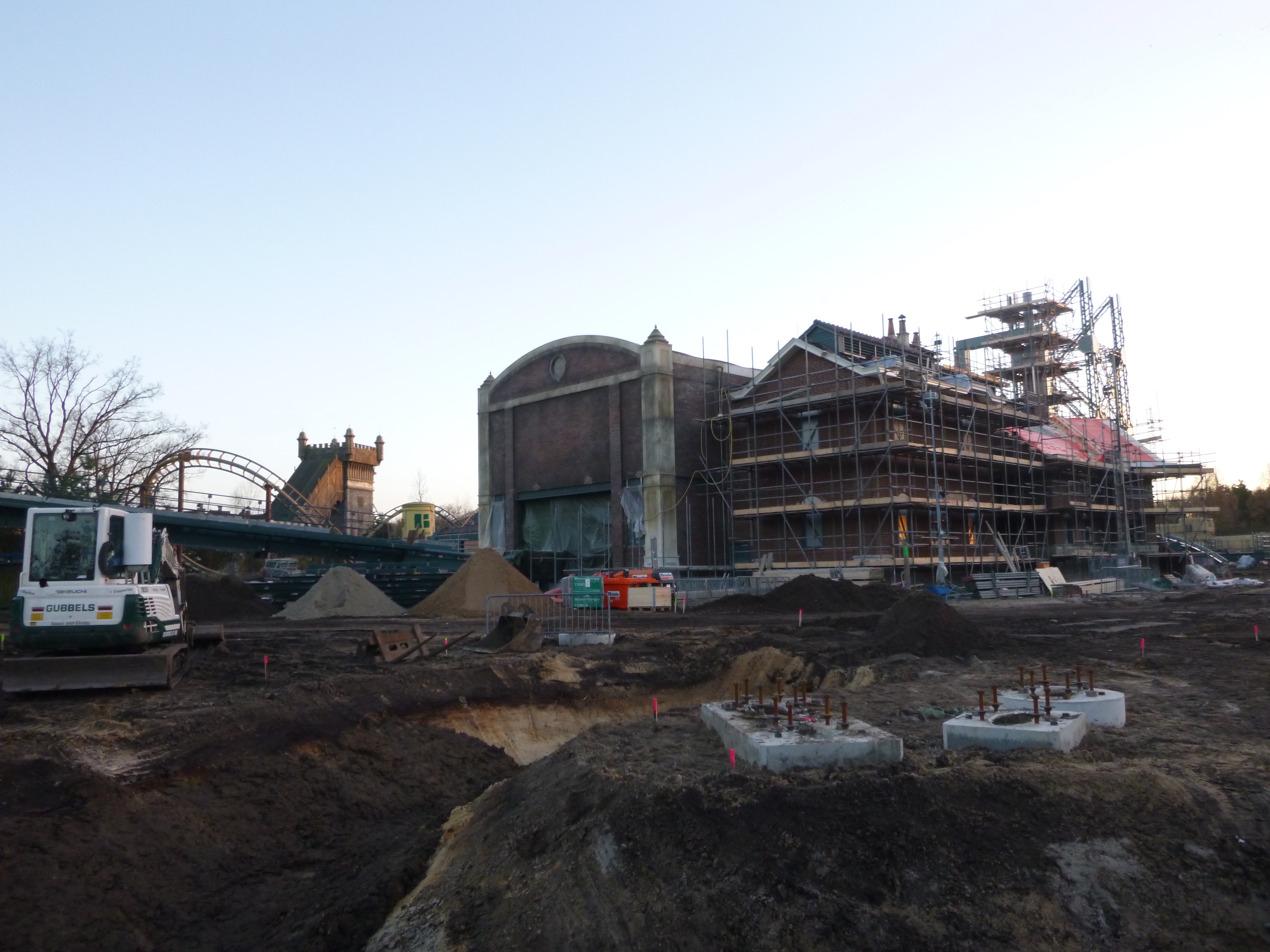
February 2015.

== Reception ==
The ride was well received by critics and amusement park fans, with praise going towards the theming and the overall quality of the ride. Dave Adams of the Theme Park Insider gave the ride a positive review stating "the Efteling has really done itself proud with this one." Minor criticisms came from the duration of the actual ride, which was much shorter than many had expected.

A negative review came from Dutch journalist Edwin Rasser, who complained that the operating staff were cranky and uninterested when he rode the attraction.

== Incidents ==
Since the opening of the ride on July 1, 2015, Baron 1898 has been involved in 3 minor incidents.

- July 5, 2015 – A software error prevented the platform from lowering, hindering the ride's operation.
- July 12, 2015 – Visitors were stranded atop the lift for 45 minutes before evacuation.
- July 19, 2015 – The ride spontaneously ceased to function and a faulty switch was subsequently found to be the cause. The ride resumed operation on July 21.
