= Draken (roller coaster) =

Dive coaster in Gyeongju World, South Korea

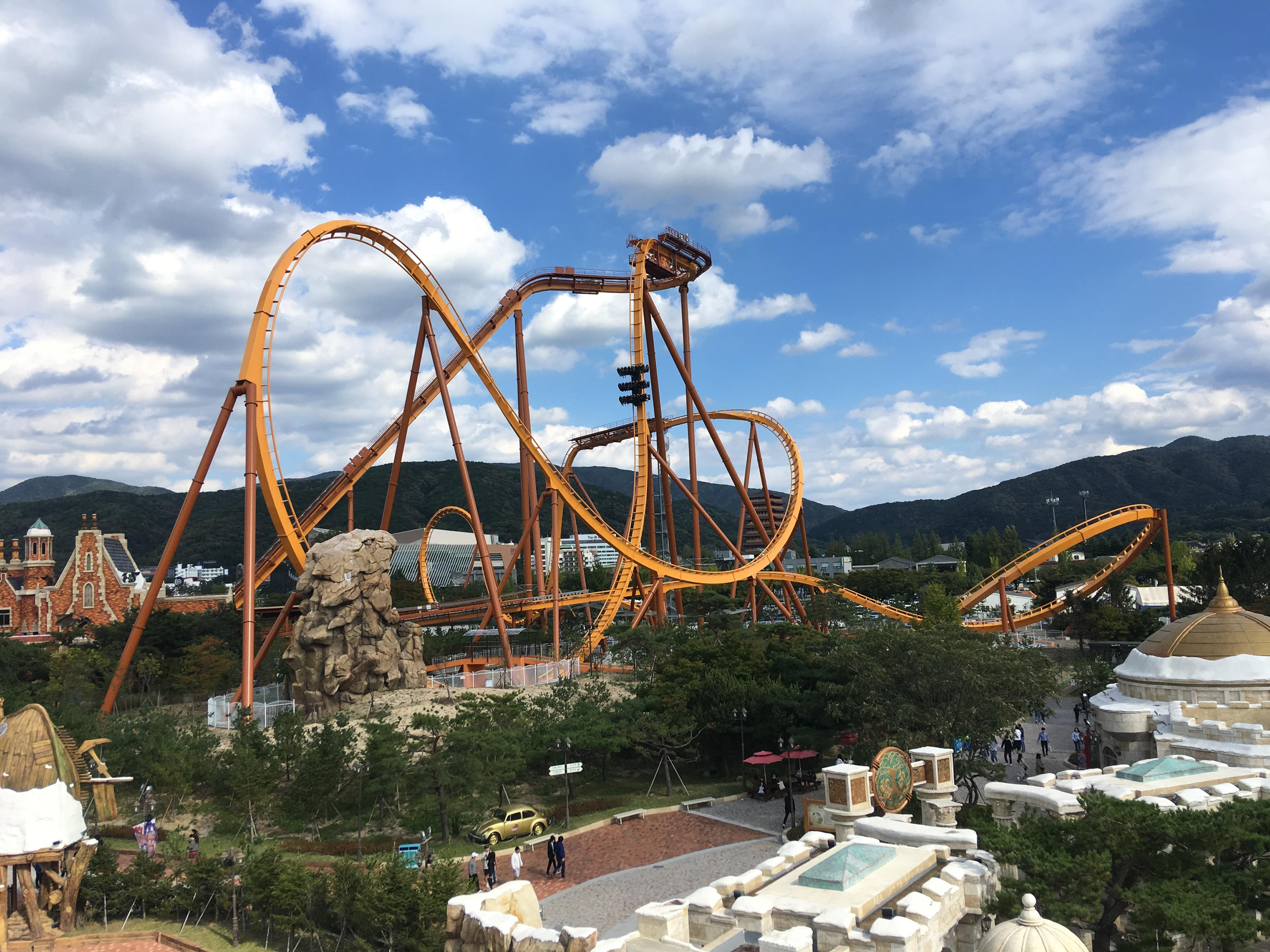

Gyeongju World
- Location: Gyeongju World
- Coordinates: 35.8380°N 129.2831°E
- Status: Operating
- Opening date: 2018
- Replaced: Space 2000

General statistics
- Type: Steel
- Manufacturer: Bolliger & Mabillard
- Model: Dive coaster
- Lift/launch system: Chain Lift Hill
- Height: 63 m (206.7 ft)
- Speed: 117 km/h (73 mph)
- Inversions: 2
- Max vertical angle: 90°
- Trains: 3 cars. Riders are arranged 8 across in a single row for a total of 24 riders per train.
- Draken at RCDB

Draken (Korean: 드라켄) is a dive coaster manufactured by Bolliger & Mabillard in Gyeongju World, South Korea. Draken opened on May 1, 2018. Draken is the first dive coaster and the first rollercoaster in South Korea to feature a 90-degree drop. As of October 2023, it is the tallest and fastest roller coaster in South Korea, and it is tied for the steepest roller coaster in South Korea with Giant Digger. Draken has the fourth most inversions in a South Korean rollercoaster and is also the fourth steepest roller coaster in Asia.

== History ==
Draken had been planned since 2017. It was first formally announced by Gyeongju World to the public on their official Facebook account on April 19, 2018, where they posted a test run video of the coaster. It was the sixth dive coaster with a drop of 90 degrees. Gyeongju World announced in their post that Draken was set to open to the public in May the same year. Draken opened to the public on May 1, 2018. Draken costed 25 billion Korean won to construct, and it was built by Bolliger & Mabillard, a Swiss rollercoaster manufacturer.

== Characteristics ==
After the ride exits the station, Draken climbs up its initial lift hill. It then curves to the right and falls to the ground. It then goes on an Immelmann inversion, then goes up another hill while curving to the left, then drops to the ground. After a brief tunnel section, Draken goes on another Immelmann inversion, then a small airtime hill on a water area with a splash effect. It then turns left, goes up and returns to its station. Draken's layout largely copies that of Griffon at Busch Gardens Williamsburg.

Draken has 3 cars per train with 8 passengers per car and therefore can take up to 24 passengers per run.

Draken is the first rollercoaster in South Korea to feature a 90-degree drop as well as the first dive coaster in South Korea. It is the tallest and fastest roller coaster in South Korea at 63 m (207 ft) tall with a speed of 117 km/h (73 mph). Draken is also the steepest roller coaster in South Korea, tied with Giant Splash in Lotte World Adventure Busan and the fourth steepest in Asia.

Draken is situated in an area of the park known as Draken Valley, which was developed 5 years prior to the coaster's opening. Draken Valley's theme was inspired by Norse mythology, with visitors being introduced to the storyline of Peter, a hero who needs to collect treasures based on four different elements and a ring to defeat the dark forces of Fenrir.
