= Diving Machine G5 =

B&M Dive Coaster at Janfusun Fancyworld

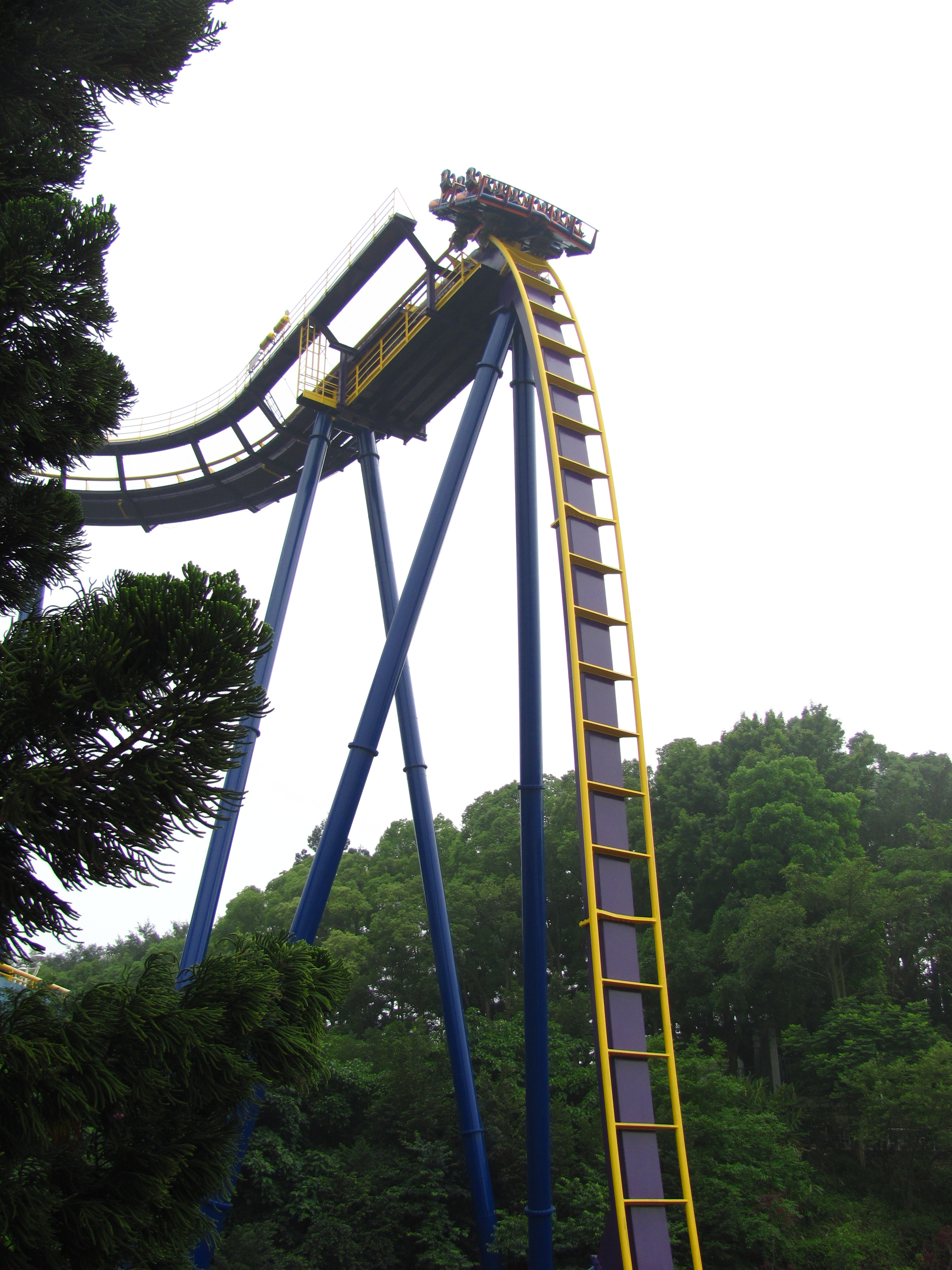

Janfusun Fancyworld
- Location: Janfusun Fancyworld
- Coordinates: 23°37′05″N 120°34′38″E
- Status: Operating
- Opening date: March 29, 2000

General statistics
- Type: Steel – Dive Coaster
- Manufacturer: Bolliger & Mabillard
- Designer: Werner Stengel
- Model: Dive Coaster
- Lift/launch system: Chain lift hill
- Drop: 55 m (180 ft)
- Length: 381 m (1,250 ft)
- Speed: 110 km/h (68 mph)
- Inversions: 0
- Max vertical angle: 87.5°
- G-force: 5
- Diving Machine G5 at RCDB

Diving Machine G5 (飛天潛艇G5) is a roller coaster at Janfusun Fancyworld in Taiwan. It was built in 2000 by Swiss manufacturers Bolliger & Mabillard and was the second dive coaster model to be built, the first being Oblivion at Alton Towers in the United Kingdom. It is located in the Sky Plaza section of the park. It is a near mirror image of Oblivion.

Diving Machine G5 is named after the amount of g-forces experienced by riders following the ride's drop. Along with the Ku Ku Roller Coaster and Insane Speed, Diving Machine G5 is one of the three roller coasters at the park and the closest roller coaster to the entrance.

== Ride experience ==
After dispatching from the station, trains on Diving Machine G5 make a right turn before climbing the 45-degree chain lift hill to a height of 55 metres (179 ft). Trains then make a right turn before approaching the drop. Trains are held at the top of the drop for three seconds before being released down the 87.5-degree drop and under a bridge into the tunnel, where riders experience 5 g. After exiting the tunnel, riders traverse an overbanked turn to the right, then rise into the final brake run.

== History ==
In March of 2000, Janfusun Fancyworld opened Diving Machine G5, which at the time was one of only two "vertical drop" roller coasters, the other being Oblivion at Alton Towers. However, while Oblivion has most of its drop underground, Janfusun Fancyworld instead opted to build Diving Machine G5 on the side of a steep hill, saving on the costs of digging.

On June 28, 2024, a temporary power outage caused the ride to stop, stranding guests atop the lift for 5 minutes.

== Gallery ==
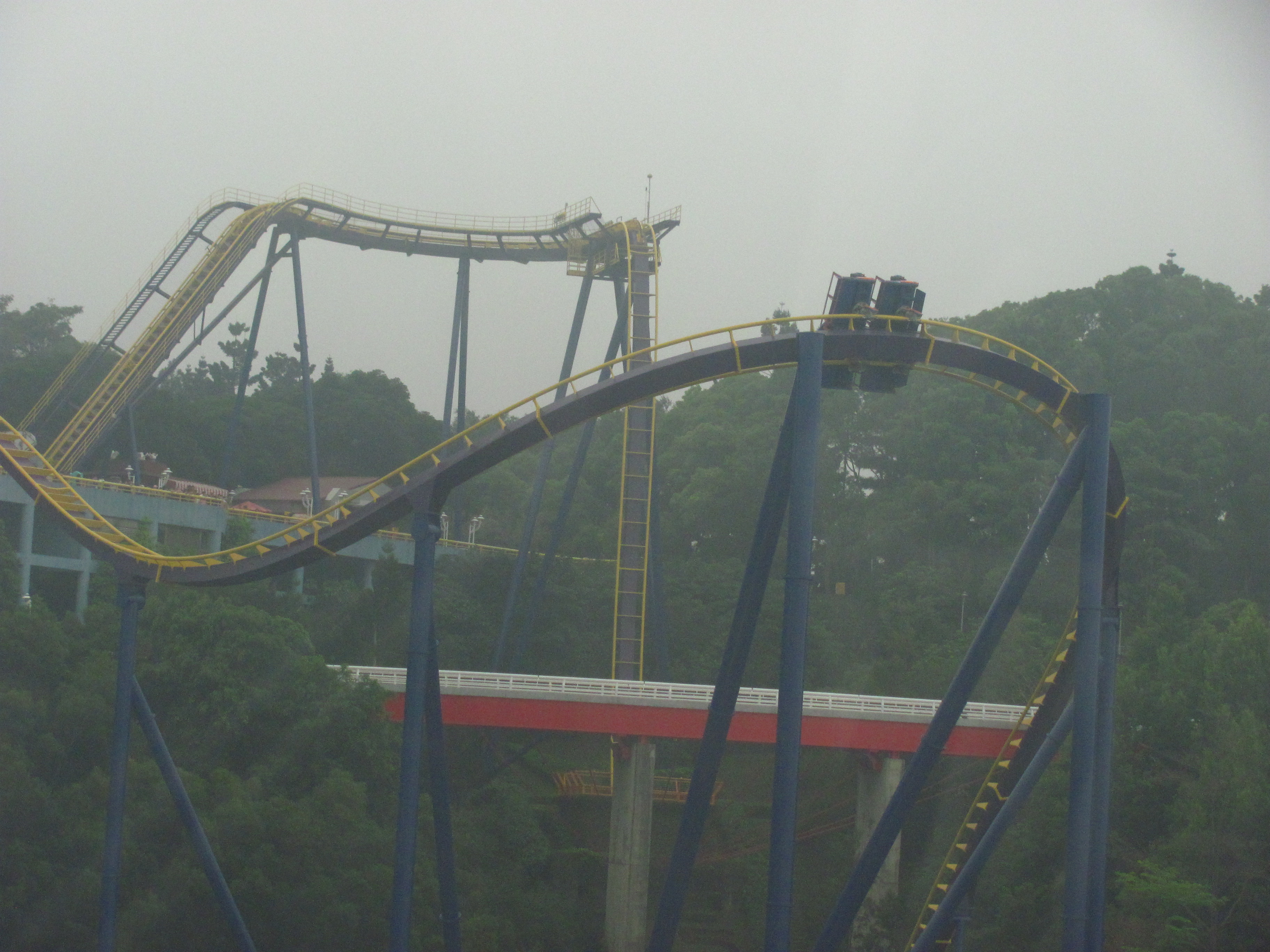
G5 going through the overbanked turn after the drop

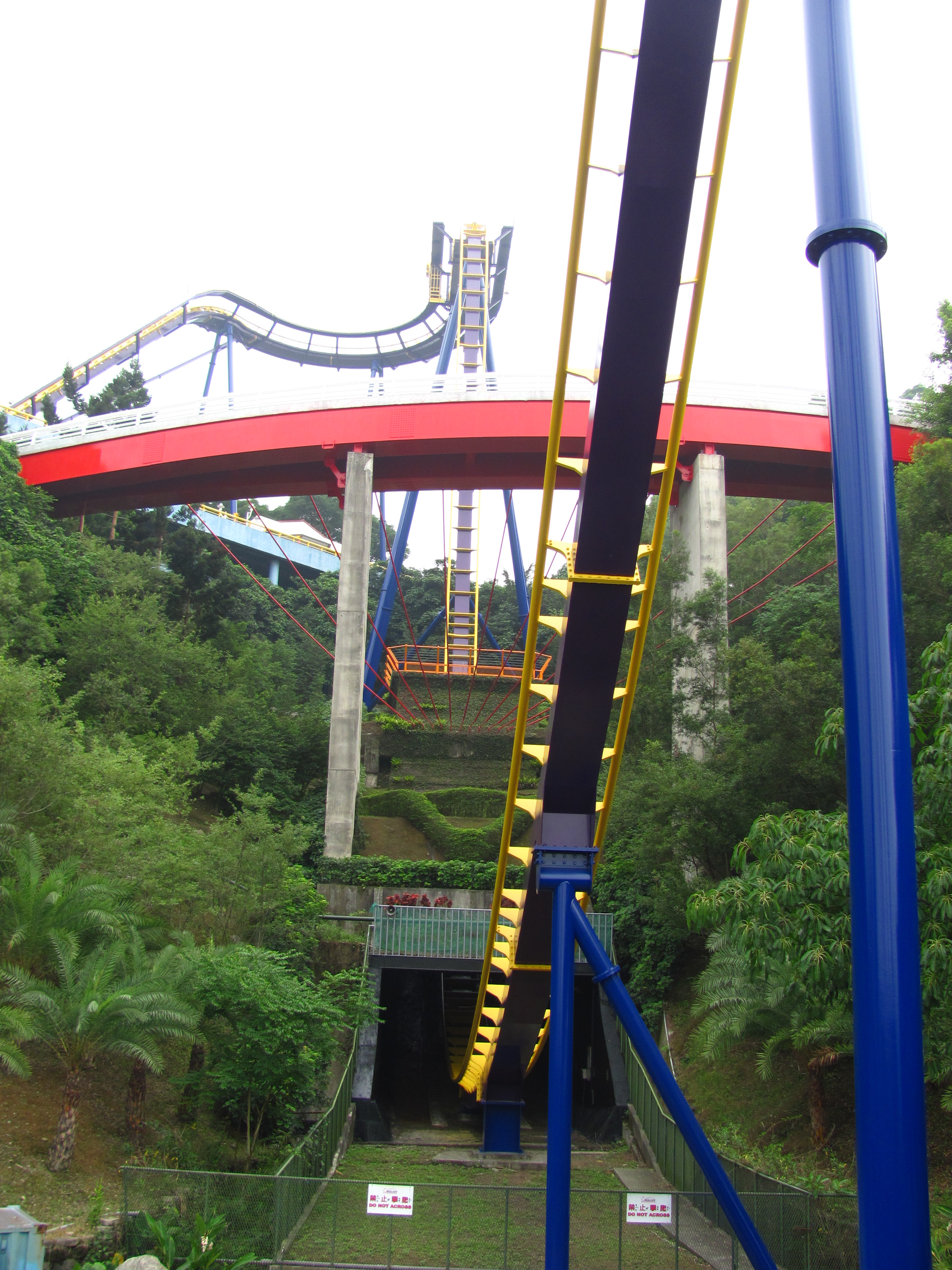
View of the "Black Hole Tunnel"

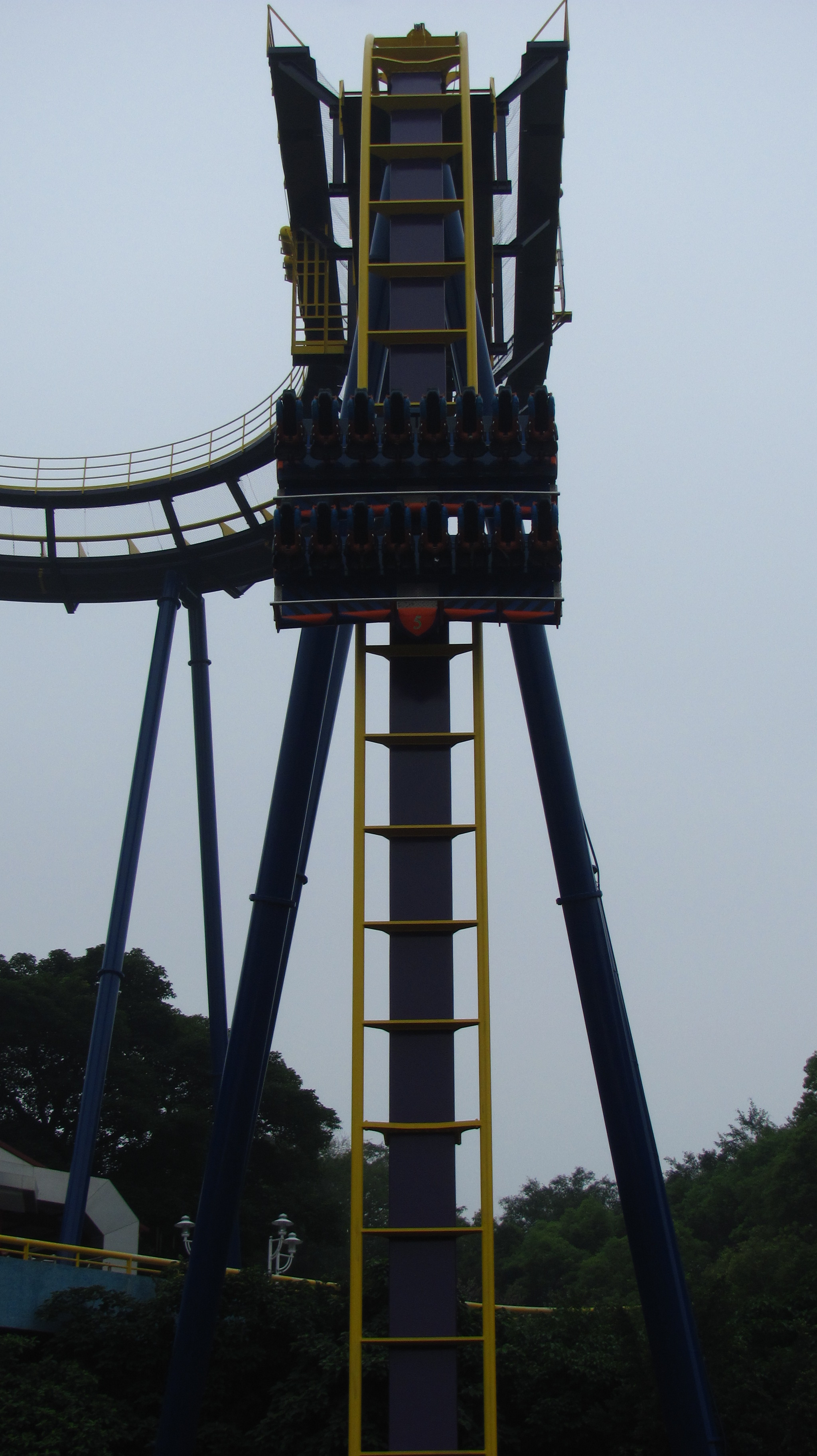
View of the 87.5 degree drop

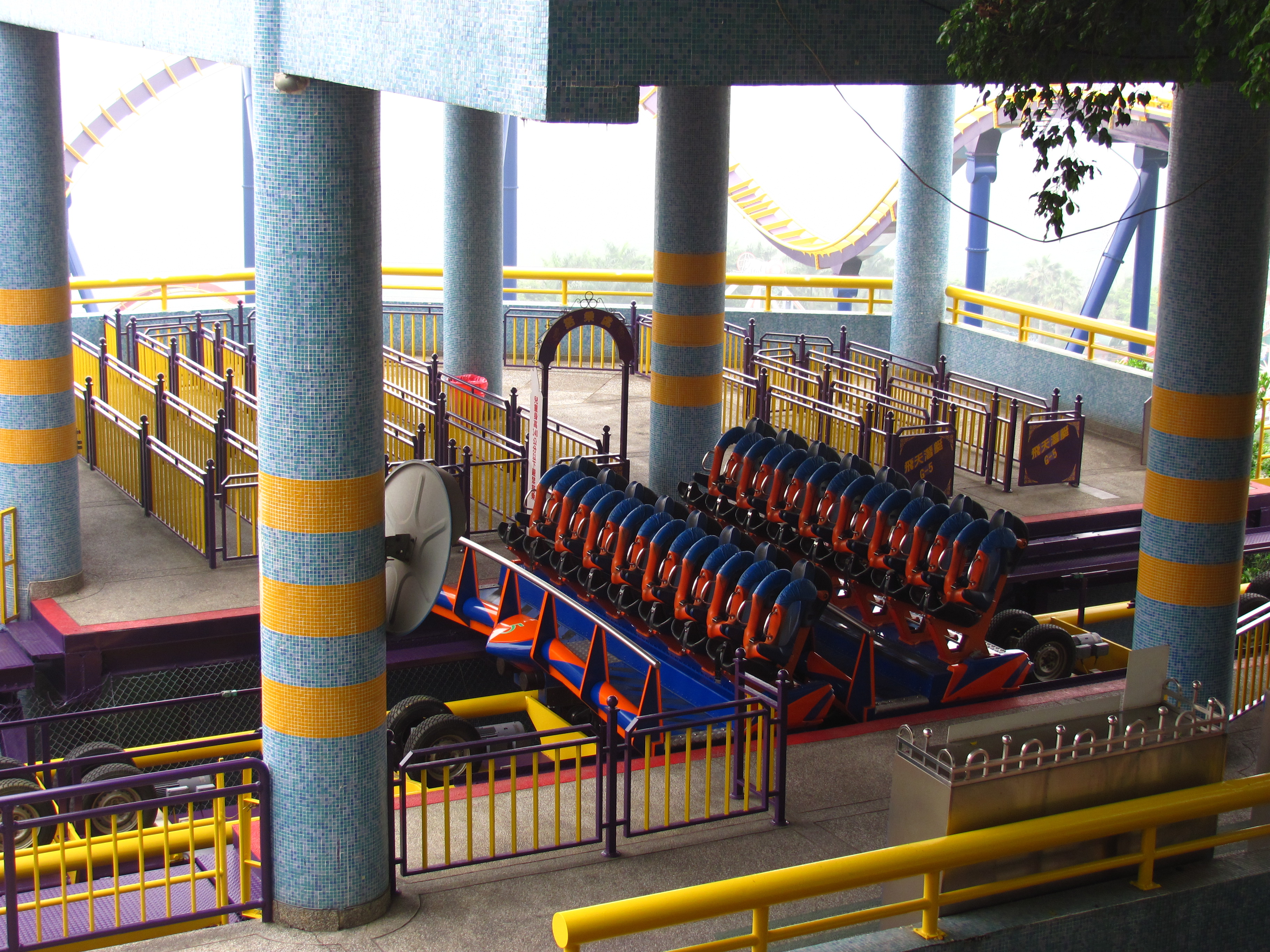
View of the station with a train parked inside of it

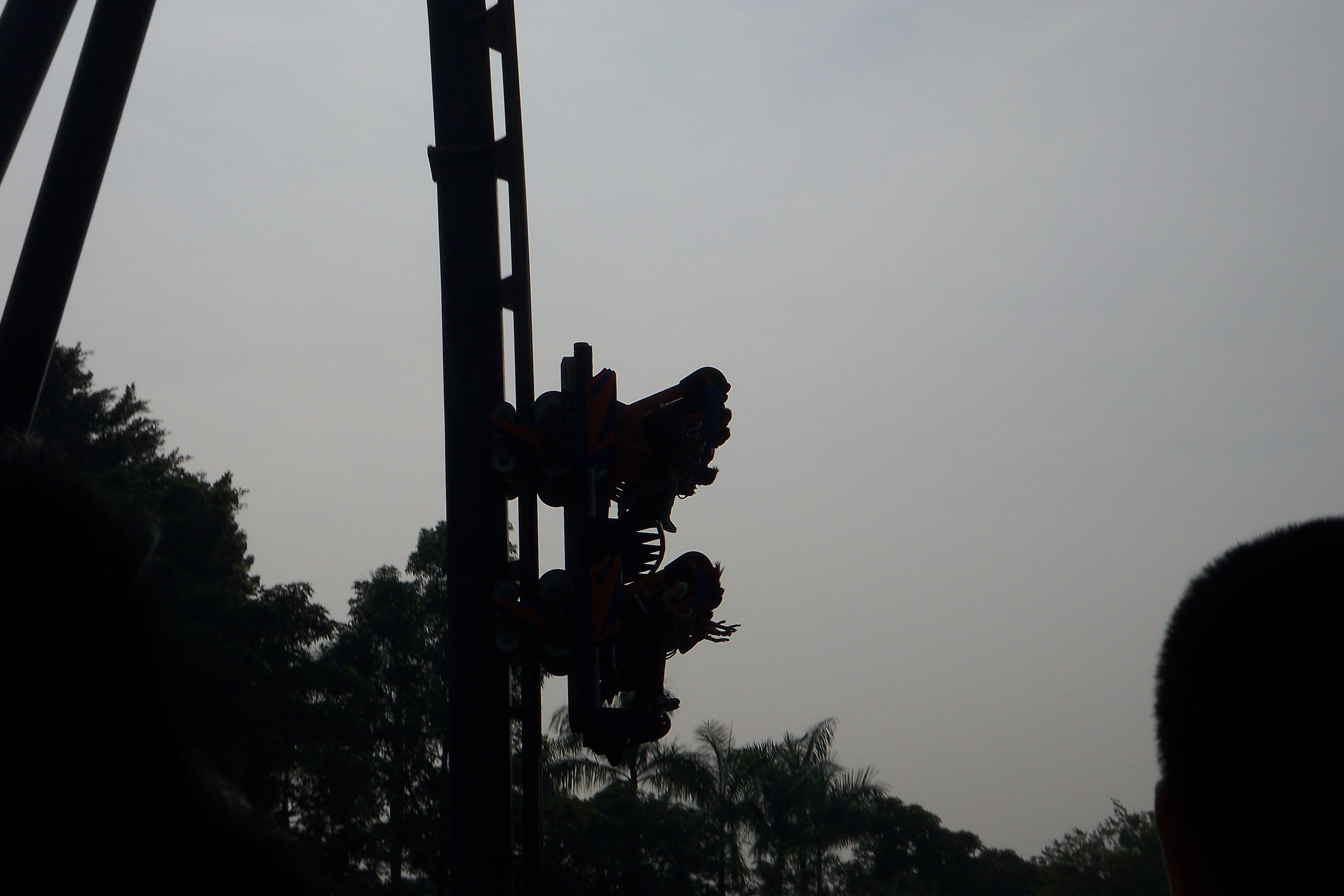
G5 going through the drop
