= Oblivion: The Black Hole =

Roller Coaster

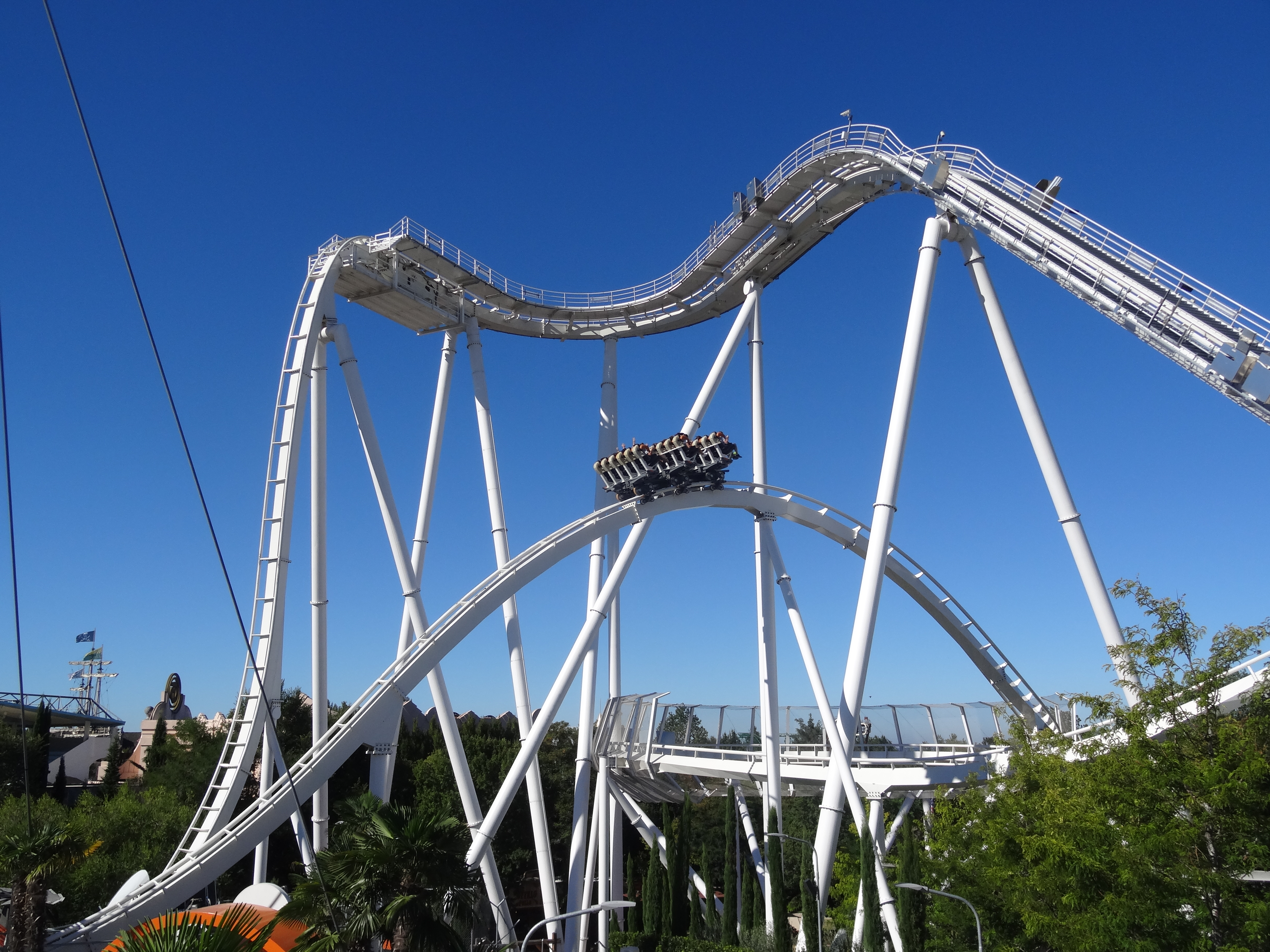

Gardaland
- Location: Gardaland
- Park section: Space
- Coordinates: 45.4582°N 10.7111°E
- Status: Operating
- Opening date: March 28, 2015

General statistics
- Type: Steel – Dive Coaster
- Manufacturer: Bolliger & Mabillard
- Model: Dive Coaster
- Lift/launch system: Chain lift hill
- Height: 139.4 ft (42.5 m)
- Length: 1,856.9 ft (566.0 m)
- Speed: 62.2 mph (100.1 km/h)
- Inversions: 2
- Duration: 1:40
- Max vertical angle: 87°
- Capacity: 1890 riders per hour
- Height restriction: 140–195 cm (4 ft 7 in – 6 ft 5 in)
- Trains: 4 trains with 3 cars; riders arranged 6 across in a single row for a total of 18 riders per train
- Oblivion: The Black Hole at RCDB

Oblivion: The Black Hole is a roller coaster at Gardaland, close to Lake Garda. The ride is one of many Dive Coaster models to be manufactured by Swiss roller coaster manufacturer Bolliger & Mabillard. Upon its opening, it became the first vertical drop roller coaster in Italy. The ride is considered the 'sister' to the Oblivion roller coaster at the also Merlin owned Alton Towers. The ride also (possibly unintentionally) shares part of its name with The Black Hole, a Jet Star 2 rollercoaster that operated in the X-Sector section of Alton Towers on the current site of The Smiler.

== History ==
On August 25, 2014, Gardaland held a groundbreaking ceremony for their new attraction, which was codenamed "Project Orange" at the time. On January 13, 2015, Gardaland announced the name and theme with a skydiving ceremony featuring Roberta Mancino diving through a ring of skydivers with smoke canisters strapped onto them, creating a "3km tall vertical tunnel." Upon opening, the Gardaland Hotel offered a Mission Oblivion package, consisting of "an overnight stay, premium breakfast, à la carte dinner, one-day park entry, a welcome gift and queue-skipping pass." However, the park does not offer this experience anymore.

== Theme ==
Oblivion: The Black Hole is themed, fittingly, to a black hole that appeared in the park. It had swallowed windmills, a van, and even part of a saloon. A TV crew immediately arrived to document footage of the "crime." Scientists began piecing together what had happened: a black hole had opened in the park, connecting Earth to an unknown location somewhere in the universe. Guests take the role of astronaut troops enlisted to undertake a mission into the unknown.

== Guest experience ==
=== Queue line and station ===
The queue line features two main sections, the outside compact queue pens and the themed inside queue line. The inside queue line features many different lighting effects and the walls are painted in orange, white and black throughout with images and diagrams that link to the theme of the ride. Before entering the station, the queue line goes over an orange bridge and into the station. However, the walkthrough section of the queue has been closed down/removed.

Riders enter the station through an automated turnstile that counts the number of riders passing through the gate. After passing through the gate, riders are freely able to choose their rows and seats. Before dispatching, the floor "combs" retract along with the "cattle pens" blocking the front of the station, two screens above the track along with a speaker count down "Tre, Due, Uno, Lancio!" (three, two, one, launch!) and the train is dispatched.

=== Ride experience ===
The train then navigates a small dip and turn before engaging the lift hill. After climbing to the top of the lift hill, the train begins turning to the left with the help of drive tires (as opposed to Oblivion at Alton Towers, which turns with the help of a chain lift) before being suspended over a near-vertical drop on a holding brake. After a few seconds, the train is released and plummets down the vertical drop into a subterranean tunnel. After leveling out and ascending back out from the tunnel, the train flips through an Immelmann and over an airtime hill, before navigating a 270° helix. Proceeding from the helix, the train passes through a heartline roll before entering the brake run and returning to the station. Before entering the station, there is a pair of misters serving to "cleanse" riders as part of the theme.
