= Emperor (roller coaster) =

Steel dive roller coaster in San Diego

- Previously known as Mako

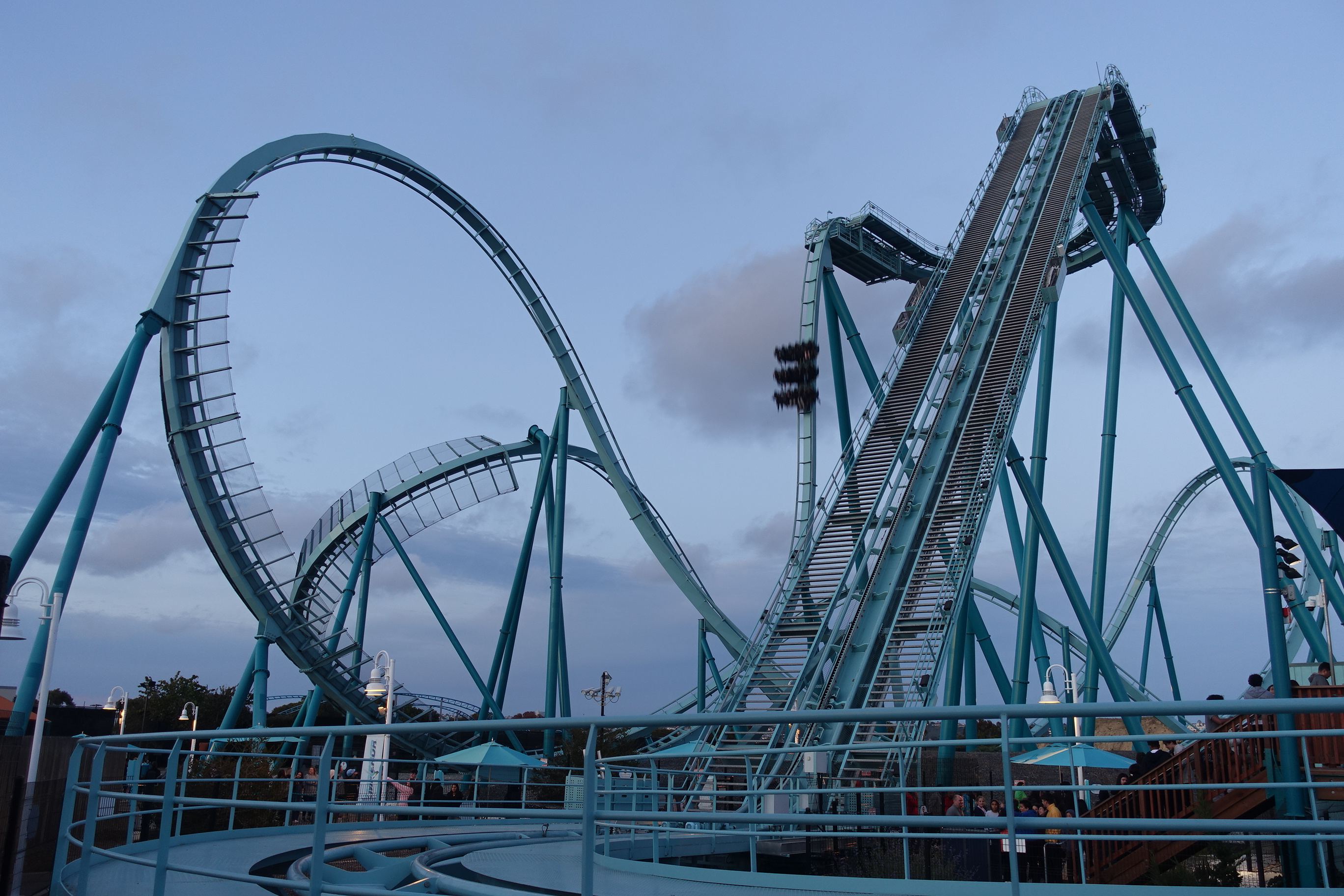

SeaWorld San Diego
- Location: SeaWorld San Diego
- Park section: Emperor Pavilion (East)
- Coordinates: 32.7640°N 117.2224°W
- Status: Operating
- Soft opening date: March 2, 2022
- Opening date: March 12, 2022

General statistics
- Type: Steel – Dive Coaster
- Manufacturer: Bolliger & Mabillard
- Designer: Bolliger & Mabillard
- Model: Dive Coaster
- Height: 153 ft (47 m)
- Drop: 143 ft (44 m)
- Length: 2,411 ft (735 m)
- Speed: 60 mph (97 km/h)
- Inversions: 3
- Duration: 1:10
- Max vertical angle: 90°
- Height restriction: 52–78 in (132–198 cm)
- Trains: 2 trains with 3 cars; riders arranged 6 across in a single row for a total of 18 riders per train
- Quick Queue available
- Emperor at RCDB

Emperor is a Bolliger & Mabillard Dive Coaster at SeaWorld in San Diego, California. Due to the COVID-19 pandemic, plans for opening the coaster were pushed back to 2021, before a final opening date of March 12, 2022 was announced.

== History ==
On January 5, 2019, SeaWorld San Diego announced that a new B&M dive coaster would be coming to the park. The ride was to be named “Mako”.

Through the IAAPA, it was announced that “Mako” would be changed to Emperor. Instead of being themed to sharks, the ride would now be themed to (emperor) penguins.

Emperor is the first floorless dive coaster in California, and the second overall dive coaster in the state, after HangTime at Knott's Berry Farm. Emperor is located in the eastern area of SeaWorld San Diego, and just off the main walkway to the south of the Penguin Encounter exhibit. There has been no announcement of plans to incorporate penguins into a new space nearer to the roller coaster. The queue and ride pavilion to Emperor are accessible via pathways that would normally bring you to Journey to Atlantis.

On August 25, 2021, SeaWorld announced that Emperor would open sometime in March 2022. On January 20, 2022, SeaWorld announced that Emperor would open on March 12, 2022.

== Track layout ==
Guests leave from the station and begin the 153 feet (47 m) lift hill climb and turn to its drop where it will hold riders for 3.5 to 4 seconds. It then drops riders 143 feet (44 m) at a 90-degree angle into its first inversion, a 123 feet (37 m) immelmann which goes over the drop and then flows into its 2nd inversion, a hard over banked turn that turns riders upside down as they go into another element which can be classified as an inversion but will not entirely invert riders, this element flows into the last element of the ride which is a corkscrew which then leads into a turn and then into a ramp to the station where the train repeats this cycle over again. The time from the initial drop to the end of the ride is approximately 40 seconds.
