= Janfusun Fancyworld =

Theme park in Gukeng, Yunlin, Taiwan

Janfusun Fancyworld 劍湖山世界

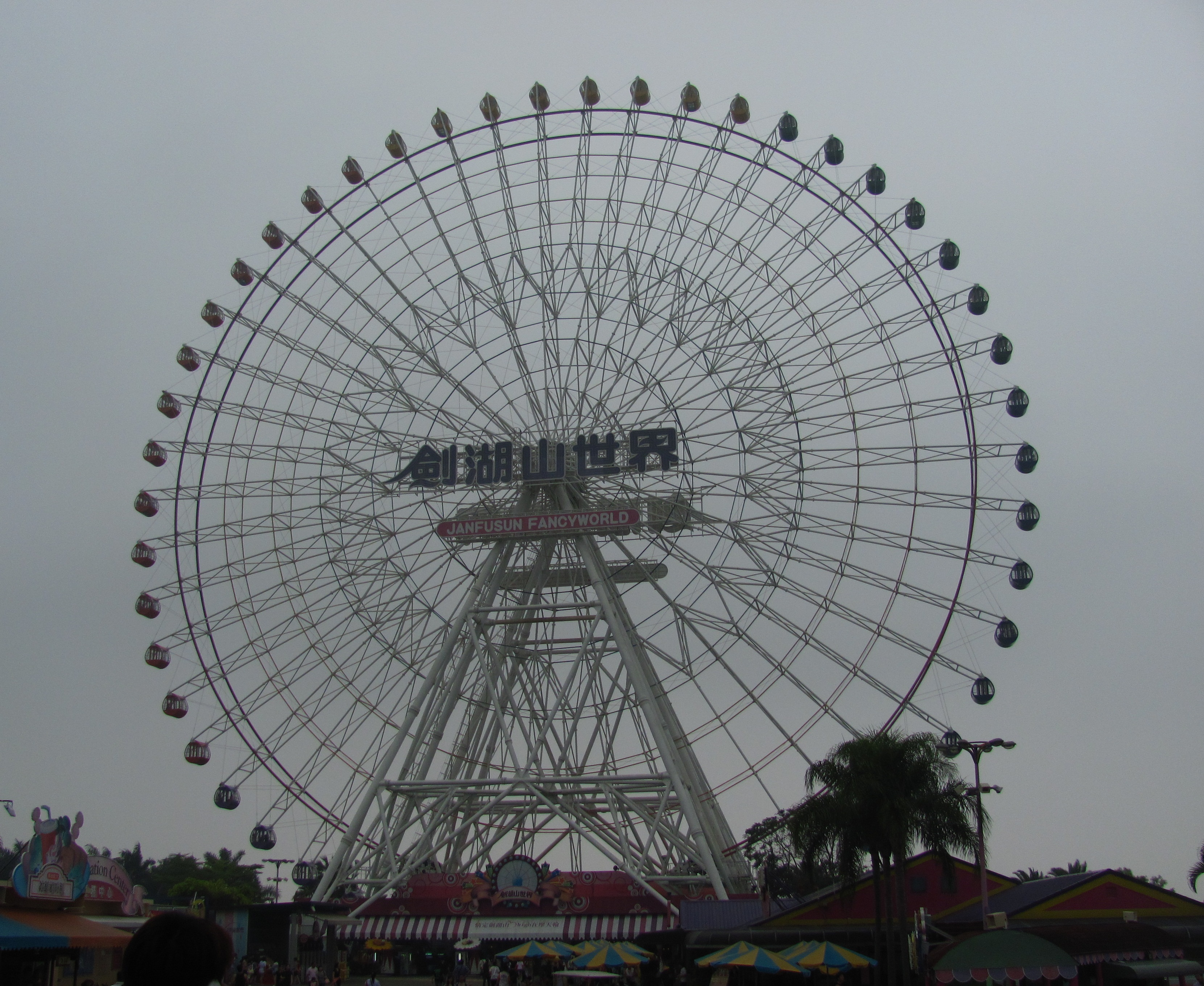
- Interactive map of Janfusun Fancyworld 劍湖山世界
- Location: Gukeng, Yunlin, Taiwan
- Coordinates: 23°37′12.3″N 120°34′40.42″E
- Status: Operating
- Opened: 1988
- Attendance: 2,000,000
- Area: 60 ha (150 acres)
- Website: www.janfusun.com.tw

Janfusun Fancyworld (Chinese: 劍湖山世界; pinyin: Jiànhúshān Shìjiè) is an amusement park in Yongguang Village, Gukeng Township, Yunlin County, Taiwan.

The park occupies an area of approximately 60 hectares (150 acres) and features a large ferris wheel, the Sky Wheel, a powered rollercoaster by Zamperla and two rollercoasters manufactured by Swiss company Bolliger and Mabillard (B&M).

== Ferris wheel ==
Janfusun Fancyworld is the home of the 88 m (289 ft) tall Sky Wheel, a giant Ferris wheel. It has 50 passenger capsules and offers views across the Chianan Plain.

== Roller coasters ==
The park's roller coasters are:

- Diving Machine G5: a B&M dive coaster.
- Insane Speed: Floorless roller coaster model by B&M.
- KuKu Coaster: Powered roller coaster by Zamperla

== See also ==
- List of tourist attractions in Taiwan
