= Life of the Party =

Life of the Party or The Life of the Party may refer to:

== Books ==
- The Life of the Party, a 1956 book by Bennett Cerf
- The Life of the Party, a 1986 book by Maureen Freely
- The Life of the Party: Democratic Prospects in 1988 and Beyond, a 1987 book by Robert Kuttner
- Life of the Party: The Biography of Pamela Digby Churchill Hayward Harriman, a 1994 book by Christopher Ogden
- Life of the Party: A Political Press Tart Bares All, a 2011 memoir by Lisa Baron
- Life of the Party: Stories of a Perpetual Man-Child, a 2014 memoir by Bert Kreischer

== Music ==
- Life of the Party (musical), a 1942 musical

=== Albums ===
- Life of the Party (album), a 1999 album by The Planet Smashers
- The Life of the Party (album), a 1999 album by Neal McCoy

=== Songs ===
- "Life of the Party" (Emcee N.I.C.E. song), 2012
- "Life of the Party" (Kanye West and André 3000 song), 2021
- "Life of the Party" (Shawn Mendes song), 2014
- "Life of da Party", a 2007 song by Snoop Dogg
- "Life of the Party", a song by All Time Low from the album Last Young Renegade, 2017
- "Life of the Party", a song by Boys Like Girls from the album Crazy World, 2012
- "Life of the Party", a song by Jake Owen from the album Days of Gold, 2013
- "Life of the Party", a song by The Weeknd from the album Thursday, 2011
- "The Life of the Party", a song by the Jackson 5 from the album Dancing Machine, 1974

== Film and television ==
- The Life of the Party (1920 film), starring Fatty Arbuckle
- The Life of the Party (1930 film), a musical comedy film
- The Life of the Party (1934 film), a 1934 British comedy film
- The Life of the Party (1935 film), an Educational Films musical short film featuring performances by African American performers including The Cabin Kids
- The Life of the Party (1937 film), starring Joe Penner and Harriet Hilliard
- Life of the Party (2005 film), starring Eion Bailey and Ellen Pompeo
- Life of the Party (2017 film), an Australian independent film
- Life of the Party (2018 film), starring Melissa McCarthy
- "Life of the Party" (Angel), a 2003 episode of the television series Angel
- "The Life of the Party" (Frasier), an episode of the television series Frasier
- "Life of the Party" (Agent Carter), an episode of the American television series Agent Carter
