= List of Bert the Conqueror episodes =

The following is a list of episodes of Bert the Conqueror: an American reality television series hosted by stand-up comedian Bert Kreischer, an "everyday guy" who travels across the United States to amusement parks and other entertainment venues to experience and promote various roller coasters, water rides, and unusual sports.

== Series overview ==
Season	Episodes	Originally released	
Season	Episodes	First released	Last released
1	10	June 16, 2010	August 11, 2010
2	16	April 3, 2011	August 7, 2011
3	14	June 7, 2016	August 30, 2016

== Episodes ==
=== Season 1 (2010) ===
The first season was granted production for a ten episode run. This season featured a guest appearance by Dolly Parton.

No. overall	No. in season	Title	Original release date
1	1	"Utah"	June 16, 2010
Bert visits Lagoon Amusement Park, Park City Mountain Resort, and a family's backyard in Hobble Creek, to experience thrills.
2	2	"Cedar Point"	June 16, 2010
Bert visits Cedar Point Amusement Park, in Sandusky, Ohio, to take the "Fearsome Foursome Challenge": riding the four tallest and fastest roller coasters in the park in less than an hour in order to win a t-shirt.
3	3	"Las Vegas"	June 23, 2010
Bert visits Las Vegas to go to the Stratosphere Las Vegas to ride thrill rides on top of a skyscraper. He also conquers his fear of heights.
4	4	"New Hampshire"	June 30, 2010
Bert visits New Hampshire to go to the Canobie Lake Park to try power kiting and to Mount Sunapee to participate in the Slush Cup.
5	5	"Tennessee"	July 7, 2010
Bert visits Tennessee to go to Dollywood, to go catfish grabbing in the Tennessee River, and to ride the Skyscraper at Smokey Mountain Speedpark.
6	6	"Florida"	July 14, 2010
Bert visits Florida to go to a theme park and to compete in a belly-flop competition in mud at the Redneck Yacht Club.
7	7	"Wisconsin"	July 21, 2010
Bert visits Wisconsin to go to the Wisconsin Dells to experience the world's largest unattached free-fall ride and to ride some of the world's biggest water slides.
8	8	"Texas"	July 28, 2010
Bert visits Texas to ride two uphill roller coasters, participate in a muddy drag race, and compete in a blobbing contest.
9	9	"Massachusetts"	August 4, 2010
Bert visits Massachusetts to go on the rides Bizarro and Catapult at Six Flags New England, then goes to Gloucester to compete in a greasy-pole contest.
10	10	"South Carolina"	August 11, 2010
Bert visits South Carolina to go on the rides Afterburn and Intimidator at Carowinds Theme Park, then attempts redneck water skiing.

=== Season 2 (2011) ===
On September 24, 2010, Bert Kreischer received word that Bert the Conqueror was renewed for a second season. The news was revealed on the Bert the Conqueror Facebook page the next day. The second season began on April 3, 2011 with a two episode premiere featuring Maine and Virginia. This season featured guest appearances by Man vs. Food host Adam Richman and Olympic gold medal swimmer Misty Hyman.

No. overall	No. in season	Title	Original release date
11	1	"Maine"	April 3, 2011
Bert visits parks in New England on the way to his final destination, including Lake Compounce in Bristol, Connecticut, to ride the Boulder Dash wooden roller coaster. He competes in the Wife Carrying Championship at Sunday River Ski Resort in Newry, Maine.
12	2	"Virginia"	April 3, 2011
Bert visits Virginia to ride the Intimidator 305 at Kings Dominion and the Griffon at Busch Gardens Williamsburg. He competes in the Meadow Highland Games and Celtic Festival in Doswell, Virginia.
13	3	"Eastern Florida"	April 10, 2011
Bert visits Universal Studios Orlando to ride Dragon Challenge, Wet 'n Wild to ride Bomb Bay & conquerors the Ski Rixen Ametaur Open.
14	4	"Hawaii"	April 17, 2011
Bert visits Hawaii's only waterpark Wet'n'Wild to ride Shaka, swims with the sharks at North Shore, and participates in the Paddleboard Cliff Jump Regatta.
15	5	"New Jersey"	April 24, 2011
Bert visits Six Flags Great Adventure and goes to the Tough Mudder competition.
16	6	"Alberta, Canada"	May 1, 2011
Bert visits West Edmonton Mall and rides the Mindbender and the Bungee Tower and partakes in the 37th annual Toboggan race.
17	7	"Eastern Texas"	May 8, 2011
Bert goes to Six Flags Over Texas and rides Titan and Mr. Freeze and then goes to the Buddy Run and gets dirty.
18	8	"Alaska"	May 15, 2011
Bert goes to Anchorage, Alaska, to take part in the 76th annual Fur Rendezvous Festival.
19	9	"New Mexico"	May 22, 2011
Bert goes to Ruidoso Winter Park and to Angel Fire Resort to participate in the shovel races. Then he heads to the Radisson Hotel in Albuquerque, home of New Mexico's only indoor water park.
20	10	"Arizona"	May 29, 2011
Bert travels to Phoenix, Arizona, to face Maximum Velocity deuling water coasters at the Wet 'n' Wild water park, goes indoor skydiving with Adam Richman and finally, participates in the ostrich chariot races.
21	11	"Cancun"	June 15, 2011
Bert goes to Cancún, Mexico to ride the Double Space Bowl slide at Wet 'n' Wild, experiences the jungle attractions at Selvatica Adventure Kingdom in the Yucaton jungle, and competes in the Coral Beach Tubing Spectacular.
22	12	"San Francisco"	June 22, 2011
Bert goes to Six Flags Discovery Kingdom to ride the Medusa and the Hammerhead, and heads to San Francisco, California, to compete in the Bring Your Own Big Wheel event.
23	13	"Indiana"	June 29, 2011
Bert goes to Holiday World & Splashin' Safari to ride the wooden rollercoaster, the Voyage, and the Wildebeest water coaster, and heads to Perfect North Slopes to compete in the Slush Pit Tubing Championships.
24	14	"Colorado"	July 13, 2011
Bert goes to Elitch Gardens in Denver, Colorado.
25	15	"Los Angeles"	August 7, 2011
Bert goes to Six Flags Magic Mountain and Knott's Berry Farm.
26	16	"Upper Midwest"	August 7, 2011
Bert goes to Shakopee, Minnesota, to experience the rides at Valleyfair.

=== Season 3 (2016) ===
On May 9, 2016, it was announced the show would return for a third season, which premiered on June 7, 2016.

No. overall	No. in season	Title	Original release date
27	1	"Walk on Water"	June 7, 2016
Bert attempts to walk on water to conquer a lobster-crate race in Maine when Season 3 premieres.
28	2	"The Big Cheese"	June 7, 2016
Bert wildly sprints downhill attempting to finish before a roll of cheese.
29	3	"Mind-Blowing Michigan"	June 14, 2016
Bert's search for Michigan's top thrills leads him to a backyard "abusement" park.
30	4	"Bringing Home the Bacon"	June 21, 2016
In Florida, Bert competes to catch a muddy pig, which the winner gets to take home.
31	5	"Mr. Universal"	June 28, 2016
Bert takes on the most action-packed rides and attractions at Universal Orlando Resort.
32	6	"Bert's Biggest Splash"	June 28, 2016
Bert competes for the biggest splash when he flies down a ski jump-turned-waterslide.
33	7	"Colorado Canyon Swing"	July 5, 2016
Bert faces his fear of heights when he takes on Colorado's highest thrill rides.
34	8	"Running of the Balls"	July 5, 2016
Bert scrambles to outrun a colossal plastic ball down a 1000-foot hill.
35	9	"Bert & Gurney"	August 2, 2016
Bert suffers an injury before dashing through an inflatable obstacle course.
36	10	"Midwest Mud Fest"	August 2, 2016
Bert races an ATV at the annual Eagle Mountain Mud Run in Burtrum, Minn.
37	11	"Seeing Red"	August 2, 2016
Can Bert withstand 15 tons of flying tomatoes at the Seattle Tomato Battle?
38	12	"Barbecue and Barbed Wire"	August 9, 2016
Bert explores the best thrills of America's heartland, including a maniacally muddy 5km race.
39	13	"Beta Test"	August 9, 2016
Bert gets to be a human guinea pig when he visits a ride-testing site in Utah; and he crushes cars in a military-grade tank during his time at an amusement park in Georgia.
40	14	"Friday Night Heights"	August 30, 2016
Bert travels to Texas, where he rides boardwalk coasters, trains sea lions and faces his fear of heights by rappelling down a 16-story building.
