= Griffon (roller coaster) =

Steel roller coaster in Virginia

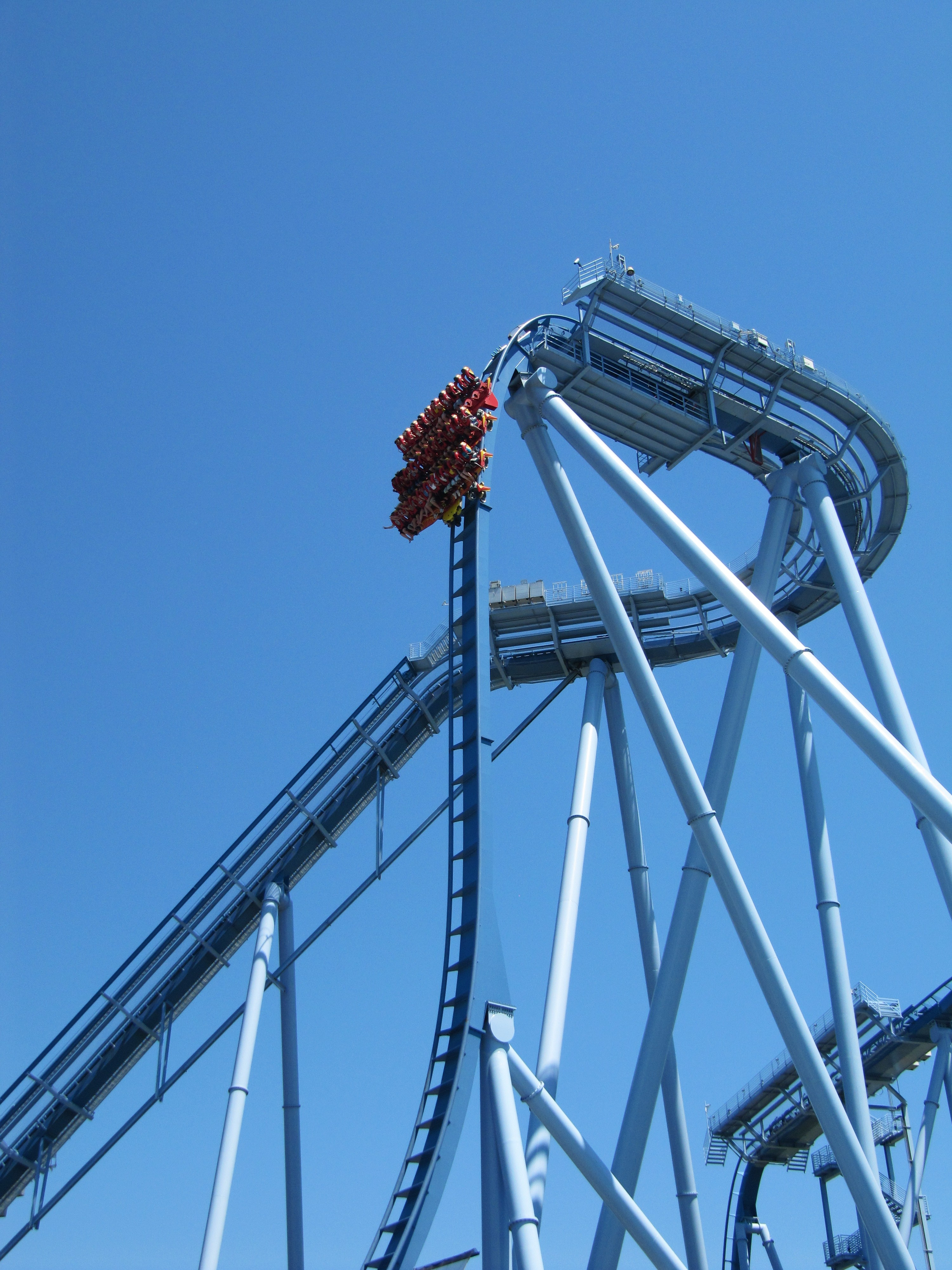
- Griffon's lift hill and vertical drop

Busch Gardens Williamsburg
- Location: Busch Gardens Williamsburg
- Park section: Aquitaine (France)
- Coordinates: 37°14′05.1″N 76°38′52.2″W
- Status: Operating
- Opening date: May 18, 2007
- Cost: $15.6 million
- Replaced: LeMans Raceway

General statistics
- Type: Steel – Dive Coaster
- Manufacturer: Bolliger & Mabillard
- Model: Dive Coaster
- Track layout: Twister
- Lift/launch system: Chain lift
- Height: 205 ft (62 m)
- Length: 3,108 ft (947 m)
- Speed: 71 mph (114 km/h)
- Inversions: 2
- Duration: 3:00
- Max vertical angle: 90°
- Capacity: 1400 riders per hour
- G-force: 4
- Height restriction: 54 in (137 cm)
- Trains: 3 trains with 3 cars; riders arranged 10 across in a single row for a total of 30 riders per train
- Quick Queue available
- Single rider line not available
- Griffon at RCDB

Video

Griffon is a steel roller coaster located at Busch Gardens Williamsburg amusement park in James City County, Virginia, United States. Designed by Bolliger & Mabillard (B&M), the Dive Coaster model opened to the public on May 18, 2007. It climbs to a height of 205 feet (62 m) and reaches a maximum speed of 71 mph (114 km/h). It features two Immelmann loops, a splashdown, two vertical drops, and was the first B&M Dive Coaster to use floorless trains. Griffon was well-received by media and enthusiasts, and it placed third in 2007 in the category of Best New Ride polled by Amusement Today for their annual Golden Ticket Awards. Since its debut, it has also consistently ranked in the top 50 among steel roller coasters worldwide in the same annual publication, peaking at #19 in 2010.

== History ==
On June 30, 2006, Busch Gardens Williamsburg announced that LeMans Raceway would be closing to the public on July 5, 2006 in order to make room for the next year's new attraction. Construction for Griffon began the next day with the demolition of the raceway. A trademark for the name "Griffon" was filed by SeaWorld Parks & Entertainment on July 12, 2006. The roller coaster was announced to the public on August 23, 2006. On December 11, 2006, two cranes installed the highest piece of Griffon with an evergreen tree. The vertical drop and Immelmann loop were completed in January 2007 and the final piece of track was installed in late February. After testing was complete, the roller coaster opened on May 18, 2007; one week earlier than its original scheduled opening date.

When Griffon opened it 2007, it held the records for the tallest and fastest Dive Coaster in the world, both of which were previously held by SheiKra at Busch Gardens Tampa Bay. Griffon was also the first Dive Coaster to feature floorless trains. When Happy Valley Shanghai opened Diving Coaster in 2009, it took the drop length record at 213.3 feet (65.0 m).

== Ride experience ==
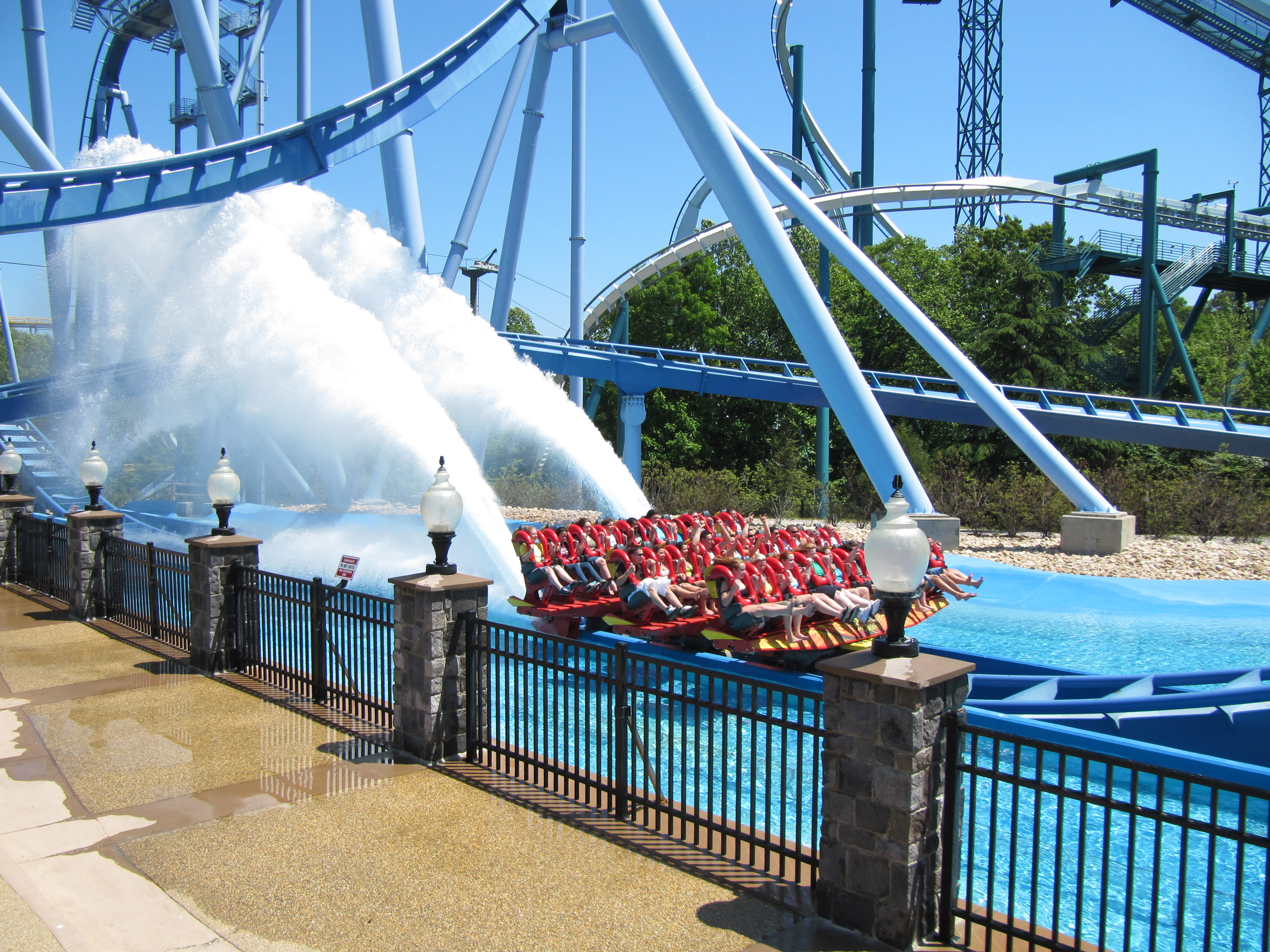
One of Griffon's trains passing through the splashdown element

After the floors drop and the front gate opens, the train is dispatched from the station and makes a downward right turn immediately followed by an upward right turn which leads directly to the 45-degree inclined chain lift hill. Once the train reaches the top of the 205-foot (62 m) lift, it makes a right turn into a holding brake where the train slowly moves over the first drop, stops for six seconds, and then is released down the 90 degree drop. By the time the train makes it to the bottom of the drop, it reaches its maximum speed of 71 miles per hour (114 km/h). Then, the train enters a 146-foot (44 m) Immelmann loop before dropping back to the ground and making a banked upward left turn into the mid course brake run. After the train slows down, it enters a second 130-foot (40 m) near 90 degree drop into another Immelmann loop. Following a small airtime hill, the train goes through a splashdown where the car's rear scoops spray two 50-foot (15 m) plumes of water into the air. Finally, the train makes a banked turn to the left leading into the final brake run. The ride lasts three minutes.

== Characteristics ==
=== Track ===
Griffon's steel track is 3,108 feet (947 m) long and its lift is approximately 205 feet (62 m) high. There is an elevator that can return riders to ground level if a train must be evacuated on the lift hill. The supports are light blue and the track is a darker blue. The track was fabricated by Clermont Steel Fabricators in Batavia, Ohio, which manufactures Bolliger & Mabillard's roller coasters.

=== Trains ===
Griffon operates with three steel and fiberglass trains, colored red, yellow, and black. Each train has three rows that seat ten riders across for a total of 30 riders per train; each seat has its own individual over-the-shoulder restraint with a seatbelt. This configuration allows the ride to achieve a theoretical hourly capacity of 1,400 riders. Unlike traditional coasters, Griffon's trains are floorless, allowing the riders' legs to dangle throughout the ride. Riders also experience up to 4 times the force of gravity.

== Reception ==
Preston Wong from Hampton Roads said, "[The floorless trains] giv[e] riders a sense of vulnerability and, for those in the front row, an idea of what it must feel like to fly" and that enthusiasts would like the ride. Nicole Paitsel, Lisa Deaderick, and Joe Atkinson from Daily Press each rated the roller coaster for its vomiting and scream factors. Nicole and Lisa rated the vomiting factor a one (out of five) for the roller coaster's smoothness; Joe gave a four as he began feeling ill after his second ride. For the scream factor Nicole gave a five, Lisa gave a ten, and Joe gave a four. Mike from NewsPlusNotes praised the first drop for its freefall experience.

In Griffon's opening year, it was voted the third best new ride for 2007 and the 27th best steel roller coaster in Amusement Today's Golden Ticket Awards. It peaked at #19 in 2010 when it tied with SheiKra, another Dive Coaster.

Golden Ticket Awards: Best New Ride for 2007
Ranking	3

Golden Ticket Awards: Top steel Roller Coasters
Year									1998	1999
Ranking									–	–
Year	2000	2001	2002	2003	2004	2005	2006	2007	2008	2009
Ranking	–	–	–	–	–	–	–	27	20	26
Year	2010	2011	2012	2013	2014	2015	2016	2017	2018	2019
Ranking	19	20	26	33	33	33	–	48	43	–
Year	2020	2021	2022	2023	2024	2025	2026			
Ranking	N/A	–	–	–	–	–	–			

Griffon has also made several television appearances. It was featured on Discovery Channel's television series Build It Bigger and Travel Channel's television series' Bert the Conqueror and Insane Coaster Wars: World Domination.

== Incidents ==
On August 5, 2010, five riders sustained minor injuries and were sent to a hospital after colliding with a 25-foot (7.6 m) balloon. The balloon was in the process of being deflated when it broke free and was carried into Griffon's path due to strong winds.

On June 29, 2021, one of Griffon's trains carrying 28 riders stopped midride near the ground. All passengers were safely evacuated and no injuries were reported.
