= Wooden Coaster - Fireball =

Roller coaster in Shanghai, China

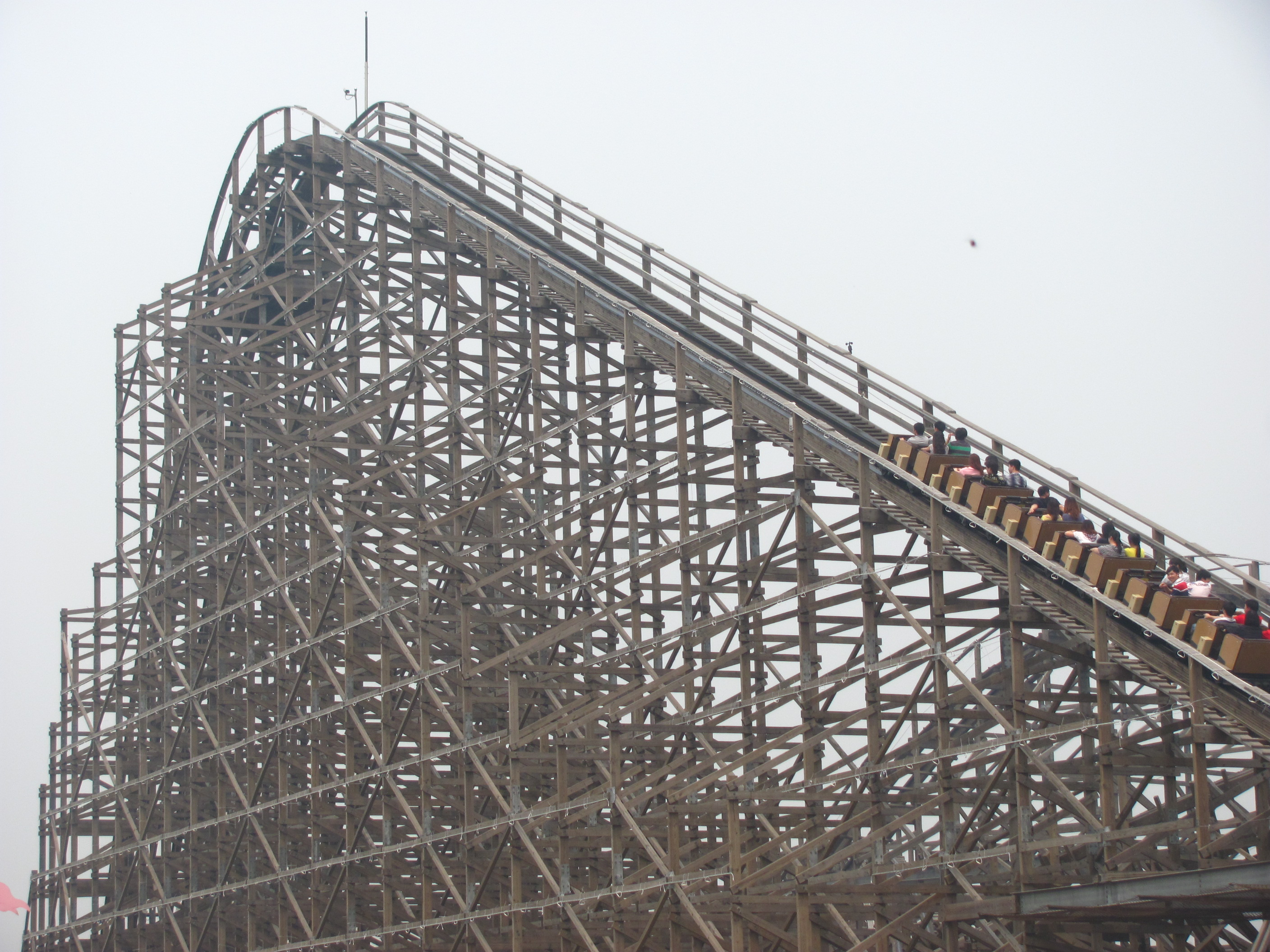
- Lift Hill of Wooden coaster - Fireball

Happy Valley Shanghai
- Location: Happy Valley Shanghai
- Coordinates: 31.098683°N 121.213972°E
- Status: Operating
- Opening date: August 16, 2009

General statistics
- Type: Wood
- Manufacturer: Martin & Vleminckx
- Designer: The Gravity Group
- Lift/launch system: Chain Lift Hill
- Height: 108.3 ft (33.0 m)
- Drop: 105 ft (32 m)
- Length: 3,818.9 ft (1,164.0 m)
- Speed: 55.9 mph (90.0 km/h)
- Inversions: 0
- Max vertical angle: 60°
- Trains: 2 trains with 6 cars. Riders are arranged 2 across in 2 rows for a total of 24 riders per train.
- Wooden Coaster - Fireball at RCDB

Wooden Coaster - Fireball (Chinese: 谷木游龙) is a wooden roller coaster located at Happy Valley in Songjiang, Shanghai, China. The coaster was designed by American wooden coaster designers The Gravity Group and manufactured by Martin & Vleminckx. It opened on August 16, 2009 as China's first wooden roller coaster.

== Awards ==
Mitch Hawker's Best Roller Coaster Poll: Best Wooden Roller Coaster
Year	2009	2010	2011	2012
Ranking	9	10	15	11
