= SheiKra =

Ride at Busch Gardens Tampa Bay

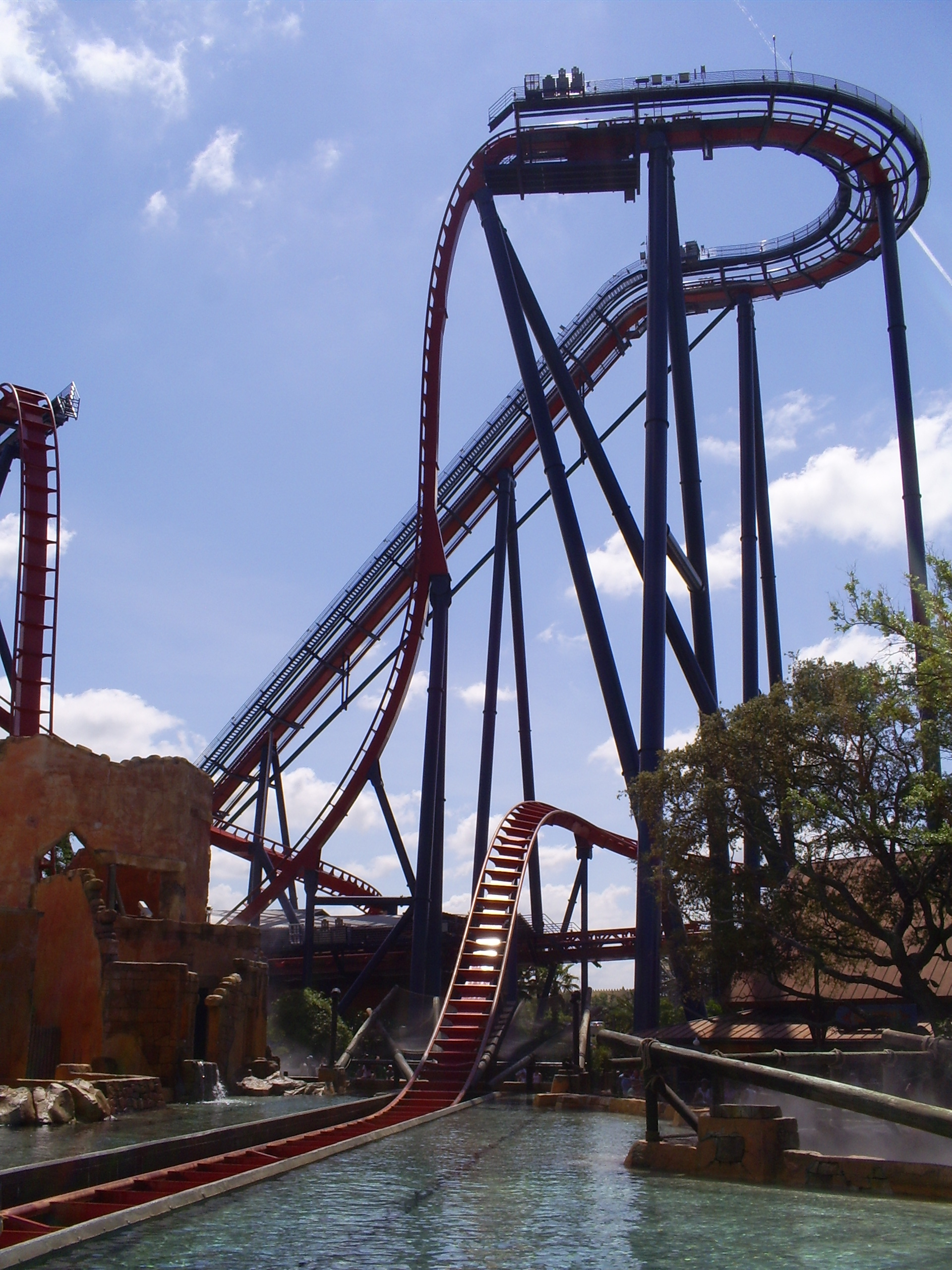
- SheiKra in 2009

Busch Gardens Tampa Bay
- Location: Busch Gardens Tampa Bay
- Park section: Stanleyville
- Coordinates: 28°02′12″N 82°25′28″W
- Status: Operating
- Soft opening date: May 19, 2005
- Opening date: May 21, 2005
- Cost: $13.5 million

General statistics
- Type: Steel
- Manufacturer: Bolliger & Mabillard
- Model: Dive Coaster
- Track layout: Twister
- Lift/launch system: Chain lift hill
- Height: 200 ft (61 m)
- Length: 3,188 ft (972 m)
- Speed: 70 mph (110 km/h)
- Inversions: 1
- Duration: 2:20
- Max vertical angle: 90°
- G-force: 4
- Height restriction: 54 in (137 cm)
- Trains: 3 cars; riders arranged 8 across in a single row for a total of 24 riders per train
- Quick Queue available
- SheiKra at RCDB

SheiKra (/ˈʃiːkrə/, SHEE-krə) is a steel Dive Coaster roller coaster at the Busch Gardens Tampa Bay amusement park in Tampa, Florida, United States. The roller coaster was proposed by Mark Rose, vice-president of design and engineering for the park, and designed by Bolliger & Mabillard. The ride was planned to be 160 feet (49 m) high, but the park's executives rejected this and the height was changed to 200 feet (61 m). SheiKra reaches a maximum speed of 70 miles per hour (110 km/h) and has a total track length of 3,188 feet (972 m). It first opened on May 21, 2005, and was converted to a floorless roller coaster on June 16, 2007, following the opening of its sister Dive Coaster Griffon at Busch Gardens Williamsburg that year.

SheiKra was the first Dive Coaster to be constructed in North America; its track includes a splashdown and an Immelmann loop, both a first for its kind. It broke the records for the world's longest, tallest, and fastest Dive Coaster, but lost these records when Griffon in Williamsburg, Virginia, United States and Dive Coaster at Chimelong Paradise in Guangzhou, China opened. The name SheiKra is derived from the word "shikra", an Asian-African hawk that is known to dive vertically for its prey. In 2005, Amusement Today's annual Golden Ticket Awards voted it the fourth-best new steel roller coaster of that year in a three-way tie and the 28th-best steel roller coaster.

== History ==
=== Original attraction ===
Mark Rose, vice-president of design and engineering at Busch Gardens Tampa Bay, proposed a roller coaster that would be 160 feet (49 m) tall; the experience would be "like riding a barrel over Niagara Falls...straight down into water." Busch Gardens executives rejected the proposal, saying it was not interesting enough. Rose changed his concept, adding another 40 feet (12 m) in height to the roller coaster and adding more features to the ride, which led to the executives' approval of the plans. Peckham Guyton Albers & Viets Inc (PGAV) also helped plan and design the roller coaster.

Rumors of a new roller coaster being built at Busch Gardens Tampa Bay began to circulate after a roller coaster enthusiast emailed the park and received a response saying that a roller coaster would be built. These rumors stated that the roller coaster would include a splashdown and an inversion on a Bolliger & Mabillard Dive Coaster, both a first for its kind. Later in the season, the park began to remove part of the track of Serengeti Express. On April 26, 2004, construction permits were discovered that confirmed that a roller coaster, restaurant, and gift shop would be constructed.

In May 2004, further details were leaked including the height, speed and trains. A month later, Tiki masks with quotes relating to the project were placed on the construction walls, including: "I'm a bird with no feathers, a beast with no equal, a fall that never hits the ground. What am I?", "What is taller than 10 giraffes and faster than a charging rhino?", and "What is too fast to see, but has a bird's eye view?". Track and support pieces were later seen in a large field, which further confirmed the new attraction would be a roller coaster.

On October 20, 2004, Busch Entertainment Corporation (owner of Busch Gardens Tampa Bay) filed a trademark for the name "SheiKra". A week later, Busch Gardens Tampa Bay announced SheiKra, North America's first Dive Coaster, as part of a deal with Bolliger & Mabillard. At the time of the announcement, about half of the ride's foundations were complete. Superior Rigging & Erection constructed the supports and track of SheiKra and by January 28, 2005, the roller coaster's highest track piece was placed along with an evergreen tree. Testing began in late April 2005 after the track had been constructed. After testing was completed, a media day was held on May 19, 2005, for international media outlets to promote the ride. Two days later, the roller coaster opened to the public on May 21, 2005. During SheiKra's first year of operation, its computer systems experienced problems as it would halt operations when it sensed that pumps and compressors were not working as they should. This caused riders to get stranded on the roller coaster and be forced to evacuate.

Bolliger & Mabillard took approximately six months to design SheiKra and four years to complete the entire project. After Busch Gardens Tampa Bay announced SheiKra, the park contracted with Bolliger & Mabillard so that the layout of the roller coaster could not be reproduced for several years. In 2009, after the deal expired, Happy Valley Shanghai built an identical copy of SheiKra called Diving Coaster.

=== Modified attraction ===
In 2006, speculation began that Busch Gardens Tampa Bay would be removing the floors from SheiKra's trains. On January 31, 2007, the park confirmed the rumors at a press conference that was also broadcast on the internet. In late April 2007, a month before the temporary closure of the ride, Busch Gardens Tampa Bay placed billboards along Interstate 275 and advertisements in newspapers announcing that SheiKra's floors would soon be removed. One of the billboards said, "SEEKING, One last fling while I've still got it. Sheikra (w/ floor)..." Callers to a telephone number on the billboards would hear a recorded female voice saying, "Hi, doll face", "it's been a fun ride", and "one last fling-a-ding".

On April 24, 2007, during the park's High School Journalism Day, Busch Gardens Tampa Bay unveiled the first floorless train for the roller coaster. SheiKra closed for the conversion on May 28, 2007. The station was modified because retractable floors needed to be installed so riders could board and disembark the trains. Just under two weeks before the scheduled reopening, the new trains were tested. On June 16, 2007, the modified roller coaster soft-opened to 100 roller coaster enthusiasts, news reporters from 40 media outlets, and 37 radio broadcasters before opening to the public later that day. On January 7, 2013, the roller coaster temporarily closed so it could be completely repainted in its original colors; it reopened on February 16, 2013.

== Ride experience ==
And as it turns and dips, you're elevated or (dipping) depending on where you sit, it's like being (out on) the wing of a plane.

— SheiKra designer Walter Bolliger

SheiKra has two queues; the standby queue is for guests without passes and the Quick Queue is for guests who have a pass that allows them to bypass the queues for most of the major attractions at the park.

The layout of SheiKra

After the floors retract and the front gate opens, the train leaves the station and makes a downward right turn, immediately followed by an upward right turn, which leads to the 47-degree inclined chain lift hill. Once the train reaches the top of the 200-foot (61 m) lift, it turns right into a holding brake, where it slowly moves over the first drop, stops for about four seconds, and then descends the 90-degree drop. As the train reaches the bottom of the first drop it reaches its maximum speed of 70 miles per hour (110 km/h). Then, the train enters a 145-foot (44 m) Immelmann loop before making a banked, upward, 3.5 g left turn into the mid course brake run. The train slows down and descends a second 138-foot (42 m), 90-degree drop into an underground tunnel. Next, the train makes a right overbanked turn leading into a splashdown that sprays two 60-foot (18 m) lines of water in the air and takes approximately 1.9 seconds to pass through. The train rises, makes a downward right turn, then enters the final brake run that leads directly back to the station. One cycle of the ride lasts about 2 minutes and 20 seconds.

== Characteristics ==
=== Track ===
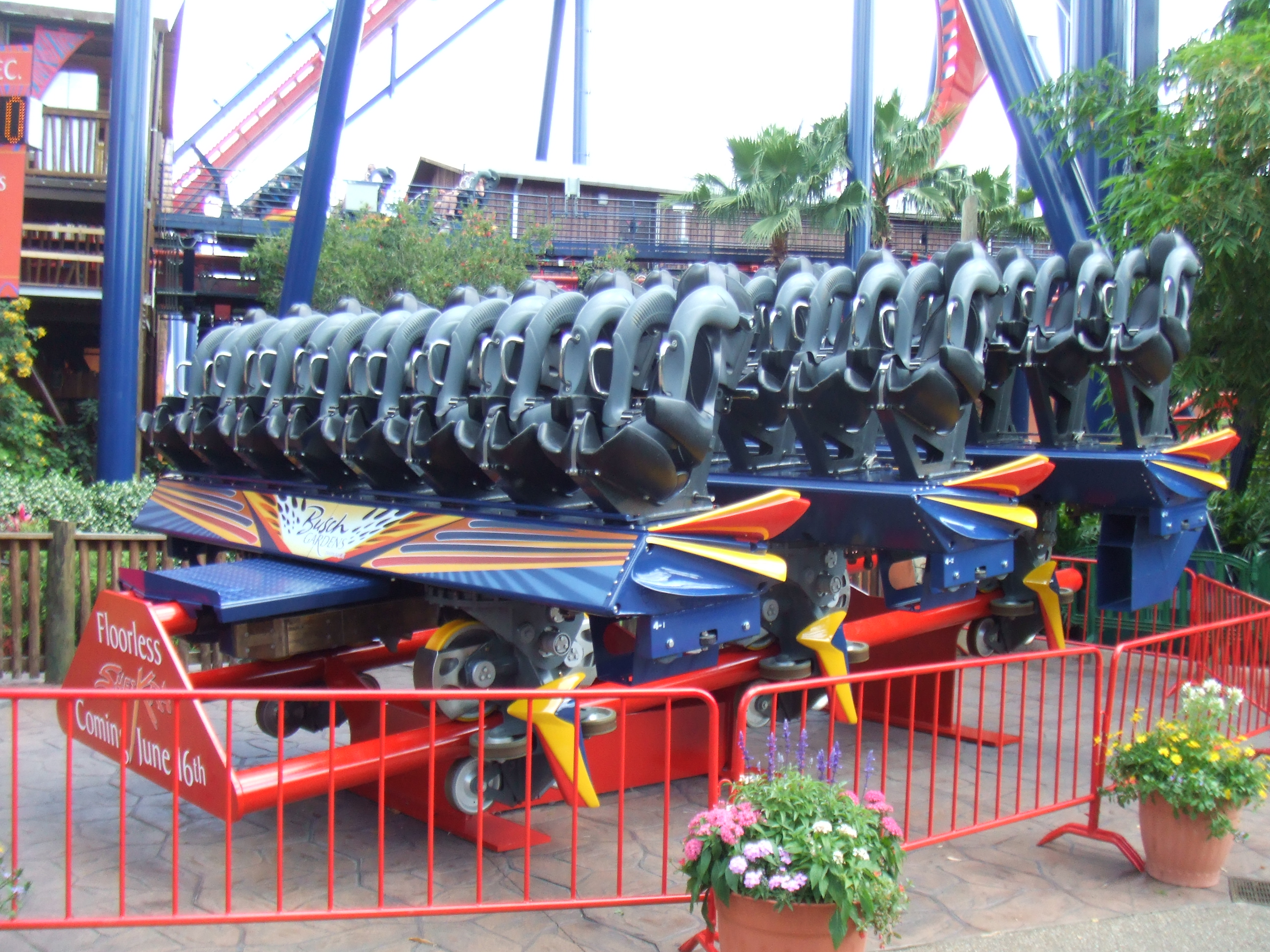
One of SheiKra's floorless trains on display at the park

The steel, box track of SheiKra is 3,188 feet (972 m) long and the lift is approximately 200 feet (61 m) high. The track is red and the supports are blue. The ride is equipped with an eight-passenger elevator that can return riders to ground level if a train must be evacuated while on the lift hill. The track and rails were shaped in Italy and fabricated by Clermont Steel Fabricators in Batavia, Ohio, which manufactures Bolliger & Mabillard's roller coasters. SheiKra's track spine is wider than those of Bolliger & Mabillard's traditional roller coasters because of the extra weight of the trains compared to Bolliger & Mabillard's four-abreast cars. During the night, SheiKra's track is illuminated with white lights.

=== Trains ===
SheiKra operates trains that are made from steel and fiberglass, each of which are three times wider than the track. They were manufactured in Switzerland and shipped to Florida. Riders are restrained with over-the-shoulder restraints and are arranged in three eight-passenger cars for a total maximum capacity of 24 riders per train. SheiKra's trains are fitted with nylon and polyurethane wheels to reduce the amount of friction created on the track. Underneath are a pair of anti-rollback devices that prevent each train from rolling down the lift hill should the chain break. There is also a "drop chain dog" mechanism that allows the trains to slowly enter the first drop.

== Records ==
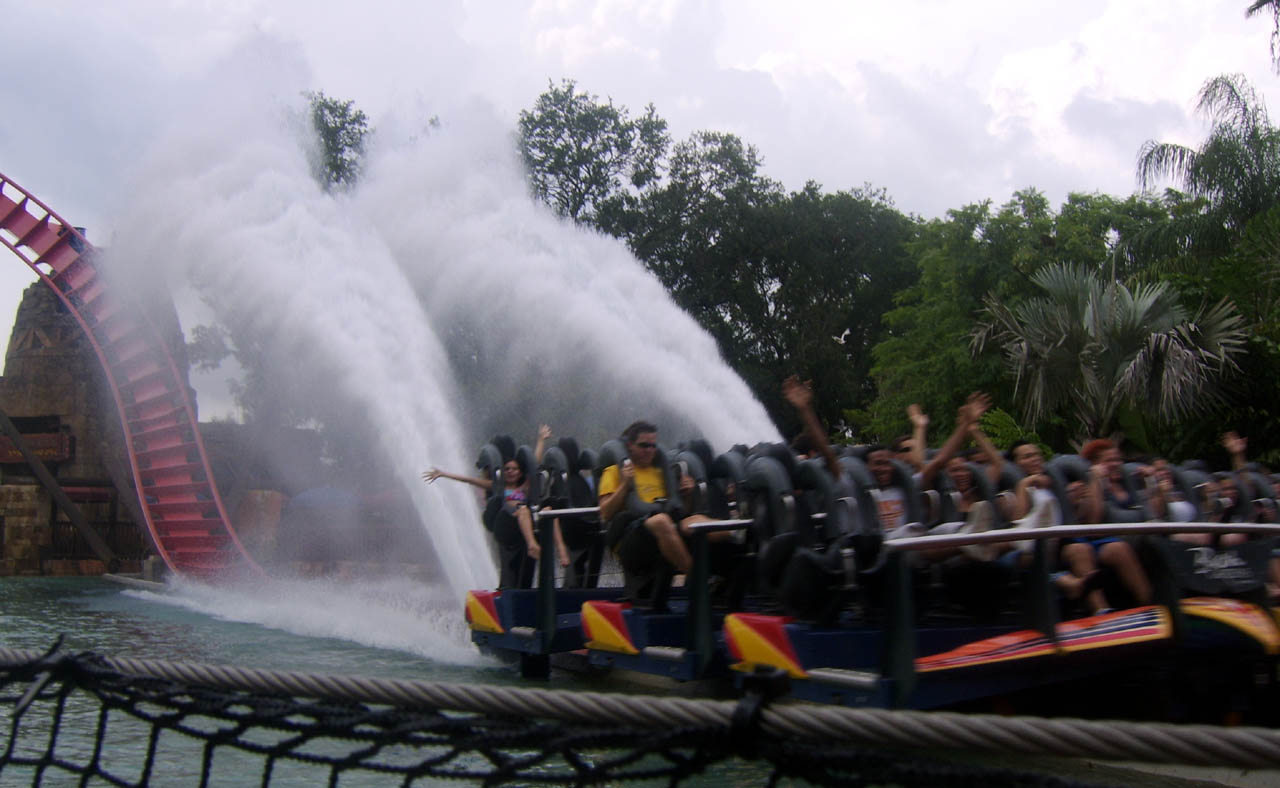
The "splashdown" is the first element of its kind on a Dive Coaster. Water is ejected through scoops located at the rear of each ride vehicle.

When SheiKra opened in 2005, it introduced two new roller coaster elements to the Dive Coaster. The splashdown causes the train to come into contact with water through "scoops" located on the last car of each train. The Immelmann loop is an element in which the train enters a half-loop followed by a half-twist and curve out in the direction opposite from which the train came. The loop was the first inversion used on a Dive Coaster. Since SheiKra, all Dive Coasters and other Bolliger & Mabillard roller coaster models have at least one Immelmann loop.

SheiKra was also the first Dive Coaster to feature a 90-degree drop. In 2005, only two other Dive Coasters in the world had either an 87- or 87.5-degree drop. When SheiKra first opened, it was the tallest, fastest, and longest Dive Coaster ever built, and was the first Dive Coaster in North America. However, SheiKra lost the height and speed records in 2007, when Griffon opened at Busch Gardens Williamsburg, and it lost the length record when Dive Coaster opened at Chime-Long Paradise in 2008.

== Reception ==
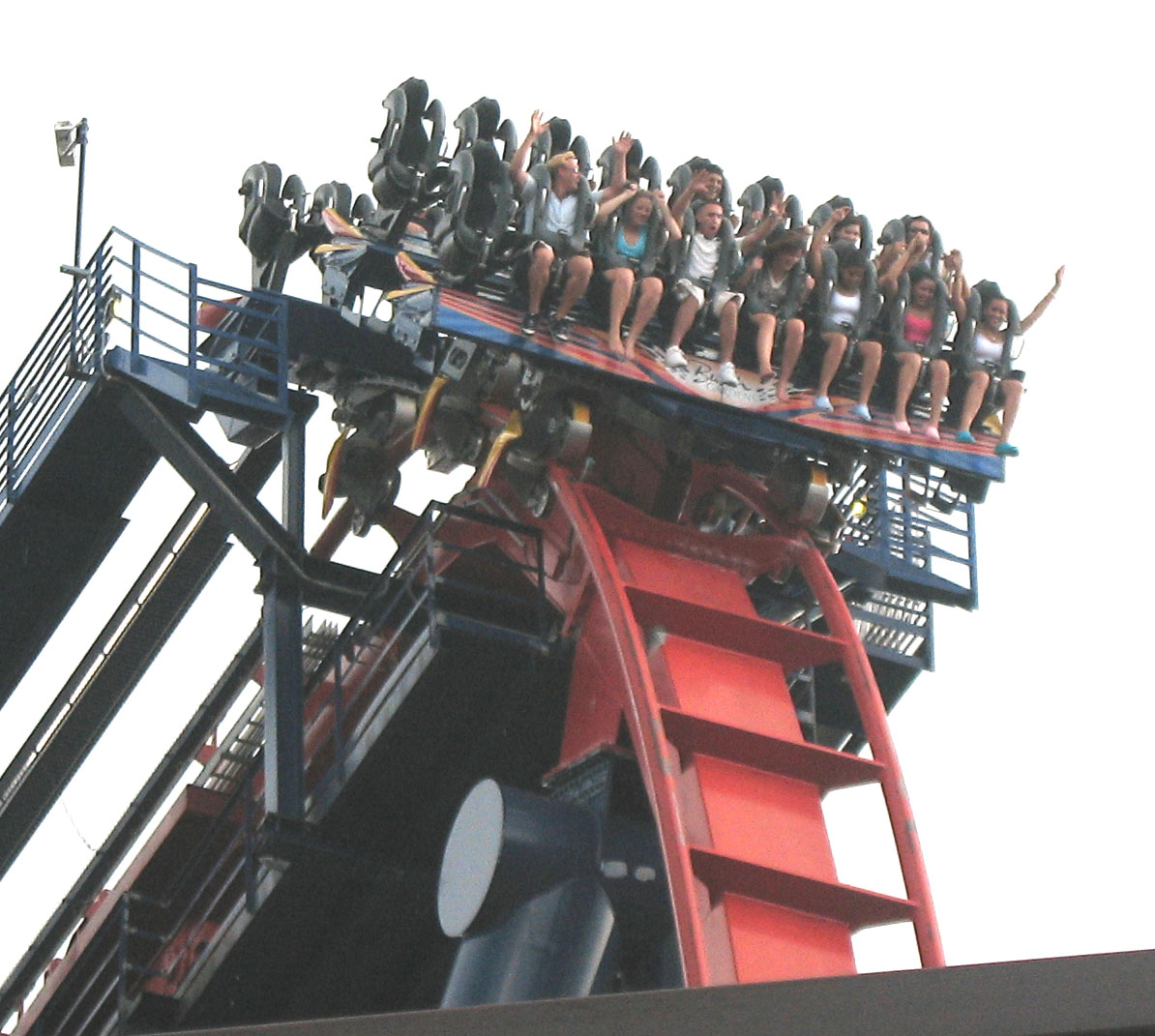
One of Sheikra's trains hanging over the first drop

SheiKra was mostly well-received from the public and critics. Arthur Levine from About.com rated the roller coaster four and a half stars out of five, and awarded it a thrill rating of eight and half out of ten, writing, "It's an unapologetic thrill ride that coaster lovers will adore and coaster wimps will avoid." Joel Bullock from Coaster Critic rated SheiKra seven and a half out of ten and awarded it a thrill rating of four out of five. He wrote that the attraction was "underwhelming" and "didn't live up to the hype" due to the ride's short length and the lack of special elements. Bullock also said, "Overall, SheiKra's no masterpiece, but is still an experience." He praised the ride's Immelmann loop, writing that the delay between the rise, inversion and finish of the maneuver was the highlight of the ride." Jeremy Thompson from Roller Coaster Philosophy awarded the coaster a "B", and wrote that, "riding the coaster is all about the visual experience", and that, "Despite the 70mph top speed it's quite gentle on the human body, although from the last row it easily wins the award for Most Airtime on a Roller Coaster in the State of Florida".

Jay Cridlin from the Tampa Bay Times wrote that guests should expect long waiting times to ride, although the length of the ride is "probably a fair tradeoff." Cridlin called SheiKra, "a majestic, one-of-a-kind roller coaster experience", and mentions that the attraction, "may be the world's finest dive coaster". In a 2005 article, Cridlin mostly praised the 90-degree drop and wrote that, "Despite its sheer size and dominance of the Busch Gardens landscape ... the coaster likely will still inspire debate among park visitors." Eric Michael from Orlando Sentinel wrote, "The 200-foot monster, Florida's tallest, wins my vote for best drop, straight down at 90-degrees, and most shameless tease (riders hang at the top for a few seconds)". In 2007, SheiKra was featured on Discovery Channel's television series Build It Bigger.

=== Awards ===
Golden Ticket Awards: Best New Ride for 2005
| Ranking | 4 (3-way tie) |

Golden Ticket Awards: Top steel Roller Coasters
| Year | | | | | | | | | 1998 | 1999 |
|---|---|---|---|---|---|---|---|---|---|---|
| Ranking | | | | | | | | | – | – |
| Year | 2000 | 2001 | 2002 | 2003 | 2004 | 2005 | 2006 | 2007 | 2008 | 2009 |
| Ranking | – | – | – | – | – | 28 | 13 | 16 | 19 | 18 |
| Year | 2010 | 2011 | 2012 | 2013 | 2014 | 2015 | 2016 | 2017 | 2018 | 2019 |
| Ranking | 19 | 22 | 30 | 32 | 38 | 42 | – | – | – | – |
| Year | 2020 | 2021 | 2022 | 2023 | 2024 | 2025 | 2026 | | | |
| Ranking | N/A | – | – | – | – | – | – | | | |
