= Barry Katz =

Television producer and talent manager

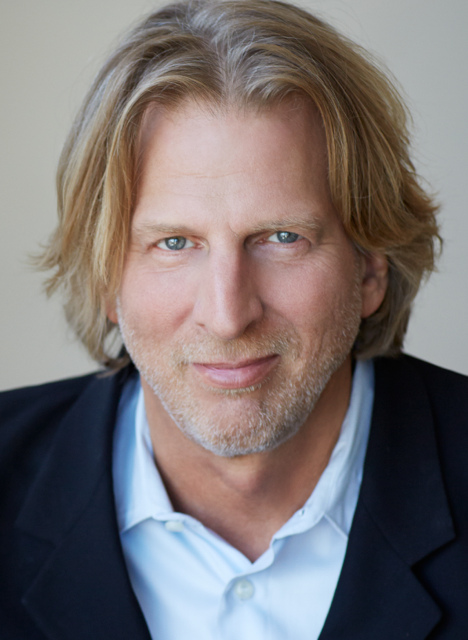
- Occupations: Talent manager, television producer, film producer
- Known for: Boston Comedy Club

Barry Katz is an American television producer, film producer and talent manager. He was the owner and founder of the Boston Comedy Club in New York City and helped launch the careers of many successful comedians, including Bill Burr, Dane Cook, Louis C.K., Kevin Brennan, Bert Kreischer, Wanda Sykes, Dave Chappelle, Whitney Cummings, as well as Saturday Night Live alumni Jay Mohr, Jim Breuer, Darrell Hammond and Tracy Morgan.

Katz was an executive producer of the Emmy-nominated talent competition series Last Comic Standing. He also produced Mohr's Grammy-nominated comedy album, Happy. And A Lot.

== Career ==
Barry Katz started performing stand-up comedy in Boston in the 1980s, but left the stage to work as a booking agent for other comedians, eventually managing several performance venues throughout New England. Katz preferred the level of control that his new businesses provided, in contrast to the unpredictable paycheck of a stand-up performer. Following his wife's death at the age of 23, Katz decided to relocate to New York City.

Katz opened a small office in the Hard Rock Cafe building on Broadway and started a talent agency and Louis C.K. became his first client. Katz's friend, Eddie Brill was running a comedy club in Greenwich Village called Paper Moon, and had plans to move to Los Angeles. Brill agreed to hand over the club to Katz. Katz rebranded it as The Boston Comedy Club and the club ran from 1988 to 2005. Many of Katz's clients were still teenagers when they started with his agency, including Dave Chappelle, Tracy Morgan, Jay Mohr, Jim Breuer, Jeff Ross and Wanda Sykes. Several of clients also became cast-members of Saturday Night Live, including Mohr, Breuer, Morgan and Darrell Hammond. Katz sold his talent agency to New Wave Entertainment in 2003 and remained in the position of president of talent management until he left the company in 2011.

Katz has produced several comedy albums, including all of Dane Cook’s albums and Jay Mohr's album Happy. And A Lot, which was nominated for the Grammy Award for Best Comedy Album at the 58th Annual Grammy Awards. He also acted as a film producer on Cook's films Employee of the Month, Good Luck Chuck and My Best Friend's Girl, as well as the TV documentary I Killed JFK that was released in 2017.

Katz has served as an executive producer on several television shows, including the sitcom Whitney and the talent competition series The Next Best Thing and Last Comic Standing, the latter of which was nominated for an Emmy in 2004.

In 2012 he appeared on Jerry Seinfeld's web series Comedians in Cars Getting Coffee in the episode featuring Michael Richards. The following year he launched his weekly podcast Industry Standard featuring interviews with influential people working in the entertainment industry. Guests have included Norman Lear, Garry Marshall, Judd Apatow and television executives Doug Herzog and Warren Littlefield. In 2018 Katz recorded a live episode of his podcast at the Just For Laughs festival in Montreal.
