= Family Inverted Coaster (Happy Valley Shanghai) =

Steel roller coaster in Shanghai

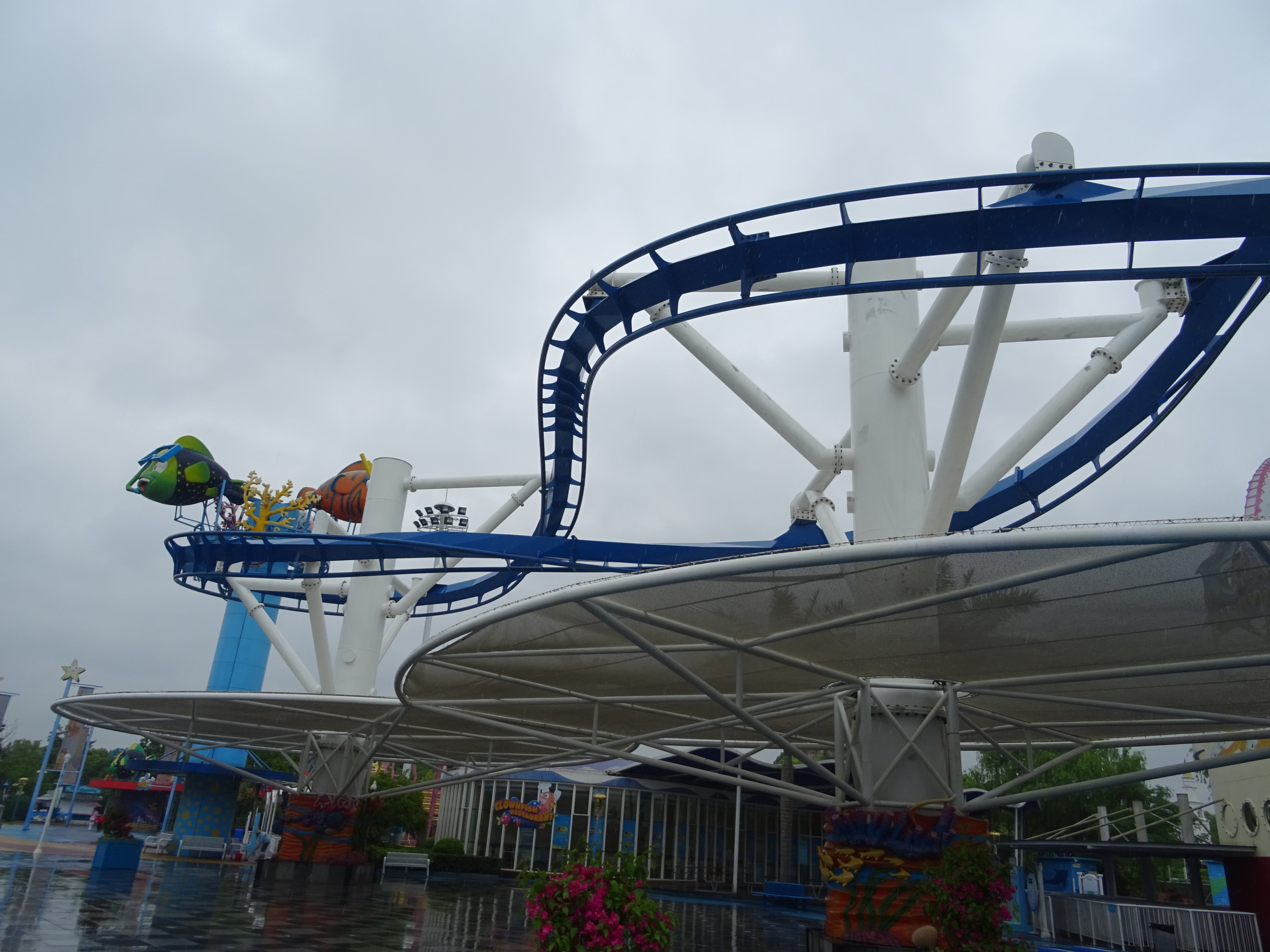

Happy Valley Shanghai
- Location: Happy Valley Shanghai
- Coordinates: 31.097275°N 121.208694°E
- Status: Operating
- Opening date: July 5, 2014

General statistics
- Type: Steel – Inverted
- Manufacturer: Bolliger & Mabillard
- Model: Family Inverted Coaster
- Lift/launch system: Chain lift hill
- Height: 65.6 ft (20.0 m)
- Length: 1,328.8 ft (405.0 m)
- Speed: 30.4 mph (48.9 km/h)
- Inversions: 0
- Trains: Single train with 10 cars. Riders are arranged 2 across in 2 rows for a total of 40 riders per train.
- Family Inverted Coaster at RCDB

Family Inverted Coaster is a steel roller coaster at Happy Valley Shanghai in China. It is the first Family Inverted Coaster manufactured by Bolliger & Mabillard.
