= Boston Comedy Club =

Comedy Club

Coordinates: 40.729758°N 73.998923°W

The Boston Comedy Club was an American comedy club in Manhattan, New York, founded by Barry Katz. The club was located at 82 West 3rd Street in Greenwich Village between Thompson Street and Sullivan Street.

The club was open from 1988 to 2005 and was a starting point for comedians such as Sarah Silverman, Jim Gaffigan, Neal Brennan, Dave Chappelle, Adam Sandler, Jeff Ross, Bert Kreischer and Pete Holmes.

== History ==
The Boston Comedy Club was founded in 1988 by comedy talent manager and producer Barry Katz. Katz started as a stand-up comedian in Boston in the 1980s, later becoming a booking agent for other comedians. Katz also opened up a talent agency in New York City and Louis C.K., whom Katz met while in Boston, was his first client. C.K. also helped Katz to install the wiring and lighting at the Boston Comedy Club and was the first comedian to perform there.

Neal Brennan (co-creator of Chappelle Show) started as a doorman at the club and counted the experience as one of "10 Defining Moments" in his comedy career as per the list he put together for New York magazine's pop culture website Vulture. It was at the Boston Comedy Club that Brennan first performed stand up and where he first met Dave Chappelle. Sarah Silverman, Pete Holmes and Bert Kreischer all worked as "barkers" for the club in their early careers—barkers are responsible for announcing line ups and distributing fliers to people passing by the club's entrance. Adam Sandler started his comedy career at the club, performing there at age 17. Jeff Ross's first stand up performance was in 1994 at one of the club's open mic nights.

The club closed its doors in 2005. In 2016 a re-creation of the club was built for Pete Holmes's semi-autobiographical television series Crashing.

During Katz's 2016 appearance on the Be Here For A While podcast hosted by comedian Rachael O'Brien, Katz was asked: "Why did you call the club 'The Boston Comedy Club' in New York?" Katz responded: "Because clearly I'm an idiot."
