= The Machine (2023 film) =

American film by Peter Atencio

- Theatrical release poster
- Directed by: Peter Atencio
- Screenplay by: Kevin Biegel; Scotty Landes
- Based on: The comedy of Bert Kreischer
- Produced by: Bert Kreischer; LeeAnn Kreischer; Judi Marmel; Cale Boyter; Peter Atencio
- Starring: Bert Kreischer; Mark Hamill; Jimmy Tatro; Iva Babić; Stephanie Kurtzuba; Jessica Gabor
- Cinematography: Eigil Bryld
- Edited by: Eleanor Infante
- Music by: Joseph Trapanese
- Production companies: Legendary Pictures; Uh Hundred Percent Productions; Levity Productions
- Distributed by: Screen Gems (through Sony Pictures Releasing)
- Release date: May 26, 2023
- Running time: 112 minutes
- Country: United States
- Language: English
- Budget: $20 million
- Box office: $10.7 million

The Machine is a 2023 American action comedy film directed by Peter Atencio, inspired by the 2016 stand-up routine of the same name created by Bert Kreischer. The film stars Kreischer as a fictionalized version of himself, with Mark Hamill, Jimmy Tatro, Iva Babić, Stephanie Kurtzuba and Jessica Gabor.

Stand-up comedian Bert's past catches up with him 20 years later when he and his father are kidnapped by someone Bert wronged while drunk on a college semester abroad in Russia.

Following its viral success, Legendary Entertainment acquired the rights to adapt Kreischer's stand-up routine into a feature film in September 2018. Most of the lead cast members were hired from April to June 2021. Filming began in Serbia in April 2021 through Balkanic Media.

The Machine was released in the United States by Sony Pictures Releasing under its Screen Gems label on May 26, 2023. It received mostly negative reviews from critics.

== Plot ==
In 1999, college freshman Bert Kreischer goes on a class trip to Russia. During a night of hard partying, Bert befriends their tour guide named Igor along with his friends and is nicknamed "The Machine".

23 years later, Bert is now a stand-up comedian and podcaster, having turned his story into a comedy special that goes viral on YouTube. He, continuing to drink hard, asks his eldest daughter Sasha to pick him up as he is drunk, although she only has a learner's permit. When she is stopped by the police, Bert accidentally streams the incident on YouTube, but the viral video halts his career.

Three months later, Bert is on the wagon and going to psychotherapy. As a result, he is in a tense relationship with his wife and Sasha. While at Sasha's sweet 16 birthday cookout, Bert is unexpectedly reunited with his estranged father Albert. The older man drives him crazy with various idiosyncrasies, including peculiar mannerisms and frequently criticizing how he does things.

Sasha soon leaves for a few days, as she does not know many people at the party. Bert is then confronted by Irina, a Russian mobster. It is soon revealed that he inadvertently stole an antique pocket watch belonging to her father, back when he had been forced to rob the Moscow-bound train. This act led to the start of her father Volgovitch's own organized crime syndicate. Seeking revenge and the watch, Irina forces Bert along with Albert to Russia, threatening to hurt Sasha if he refuses.

Arriving in Russia, Bert finds he is known there, on billboards, as a brand of vodka and recognized everywhere. He tries to jog his memory by retracing his steps. In flashbacks, Bert remembers partying with Igor, as a banditti. Irina takes Bert, Albert and her henchman Sponge to the place where Bert thinks there may be clues to finding Igor and the watch. They find the wall where he had hidden his stash, but the watch is not among his goodies. Irina's younger brother Vanya shows up, declaring that her being a woman prevents her from becoming mob boss. Irina and Bert take him and his henchmen out, then head to the Moscow train to find Igor, who is supposedly the head banditti who regularly robs it.

Bert remembers how Igor introduced him to the banditti Fedor, who had forced him to rob the train, including his classmates, then partied heavily with them. Continuing to remember, he finally recalls Volgovitch and his watch. Irina explains that that act infuriated the then travelling salesman to form his own crime syndicate.

An Igor finally shows up, but he is not Bert's friend. This man and his henchmen begin to subdue Bert and Albert, but Irina takes them out. Her other brother Alexi appears, also seeking the watch. He shoots her in the chest, off the back of the train, then Albert pushes Bert out as well.

When Bert wakes in the morning, he is almost accidentally shot by Igor, who lives nearby and is bear hunting. In the village, he is welcomed. Bert then finds Irina, who survived Alexei's shooting thanks to a bullet-proof vest. Igor explained he quit the mafia due to Bert's inspiration to seek joy. He settled down, and now has a big family and wife. Talking with Irina, she makes Bert realize he should find a balance between being The Machine and Bert.

Igor has the watch, as Bert had gifted it to him. He gives it and the bag of valuables stolen from Bert's classmates to him. Irina heads to Moscow with Bert, to claim her place as head of her father's organization and to seek Albert. Finding Alexei and a very high Albert, Irina triumphantly shows him the watch, which the turncoat Sponge takes from her.

The normally pacifist Albert stabs Alexei, There is a lengthy fight, with Irina reclaiming the watch. When their father appears, he refuses to recognize Irina as his successor. He calls her weak, so she shoots him dead, taking over his operation.

Bert heads back to Florida after bonding with Irina. He reconciles with his family, and is a happier man.

== Cast ==
- Bert Kreischer as himself
- Mark Hamill as Albert, Bert's father
- Jimmy Tatro as young Bert Kreischer
- Iva Babić as Irina, a mobster
- Robert Maaser as Alexei, Irina's brother
- Stephanie Kurtzuba as LeeAnn
- Martyn Ford as Sponge
- Jessica Gabor as Sasha, Bert's eldest daughter
- Rita Bernard Shaw as Ashley
- Nikola Đuričko as Igor
- Oleg Taktarov as Train Igor
- Amelie Villiers as Tatiana, Bert's younger daughter
- Marko Nedeljkovic as young Igor
- Aleksandar Srećković as Fedor
- Mercedes De La Cruz as a teacher

== Production ==
In September 2019, Legendary Entertainment acquired the rights to develop comedian Bert Kreischer's stand-up routine into a feature film adaptation following its viral success. In April 2021, Peter Atencio was hired to direct and produce the film with Kreischer and Judi Marmel. Kevin Biegel and Scotty Landes wrote the film. Joseph Trapanese composed the film's original score.

In April 2021, Kreischer was set to play himself and Mark Hamill was cast as Bert's father, Albert Kreischer Sr. Jess Gabor was cast as Bert's daughter. In May and June 2021, Stephanie Kurtzuba, Mercedes De La Cruz and Jimmy Tatro were cast in the film. Principal photography took place in Serbia in April 2021.

== Release ==
The Machine was released in the United States by Sony Pictures Releasing under its Screen Gems label on May 26, 2023.

The film was released for digital platforms on June 20, 2023, followed by a Blu-ray and DVD release on August 15, 2023 by Sony Pictures Home Entertainment.

=== Box office ===
The film was a box-office bomb. In the United States and Canada, The Machine was released alongside The Little Mermaid, Kandahar, About My Father, and You Hurt My Feelings. The film was projected to gross around $5 million from 2,409 theaters over its four-day Memorial Day opening weekend. The film made $2.2 million on its first day, $5 million in the traditional weekend, and $5.9 million over the four-day frame. In its second weekend, the film declined 66% to $1.7 million, finishing in eighth place.

=== Critical response ===
On the review aggregator website Rotten Tomatoes, 32% of 25 critics' reviews are positive, with an average rating of 4.4/10. The website's consensus reads: "A sloppily lifeless movie that's strictly for hardcore Bert Kreischer fans, The Machine is broken beyond repair." Metacritic, which uses a weighted average, assigned the film a score of 37 out of 100, based on seven critics, indicating "generally unfavorable" reviews. Audiences surveyed by CinemaScore gave the film a "B+" grade at the A+ to F scale, while PostTrak gave the film an overall 78% positive score, with 60% saying they would definitely recommend it.
