= Life of the Party: Stories of a Perpetual Man-Child =

Memoir by Bert Kreischer

- Author: Bert Kreischer
- Language: English
- Genre: Memoir
- Publisher: St. Martin's Press
- Publication date: 2014

Life of the Party: Stories of a Perpetual Man-Child is a 2014 memoir by Bert Kreischer, discussing how he came into his career.

Kirkus Reviews stated that the audience was probably majority male and seldom read books.

== Reception ==
Publishers Weekly stated that the book is "a genuinely hilarious look at life in the fast lane" due to "Kreischer's "charm" due to his "affability and self-deprecation".

Kirkus Reviews stated that the book was "sophomoric".
