= Life of the Party: The Biography of Pamela Digby Churchill Hayward Harriman =

Unauthorized biography of Pamela Harriman written by Christopher Ogden

- Author: Christopher Ogden
- Language: English
- Genre: Biography
- Publisher: Little, Brown
- Publication date: 1994
- Publication place: United Kingdom
- ISBN: 9780316633765

Life of the Party: The Biography of Pamela Digby Churchill Hayward Harriman is an unauthorized 1994 biography of Pamela Harriman by Christopher Ogden.

== Background ==
The author stated that he chose to write the book anyway after Harriman canceled plans for an authorized biography and did not pay him for the work he did. Kirkus Reviews stated "That may or may not have influenced his perspective when he decided to write the story anyway".

Ogden had, over a period of several months, collected about forty hours of interview footage.

Ogden was a correspondent for Time.

== Content ==
There are nineteen chapters, with most of them each being named after a male figure with significance in the biography.

Kirkus stated that the author had a negative view of her romantic ties, and according to Kirkus this was not primarily about any promiscuity but instead about allowing her partners to give her support.

== Reception ==
Kirkus Reviews stated that " This is fun to read as the names drop, but it offers more titillation than insight into" the subject.

Publishers Weekly stated that the book is "captivating, gossipy, withering".
