= Diving Coaster =

Roller coaster in Shanghai, China

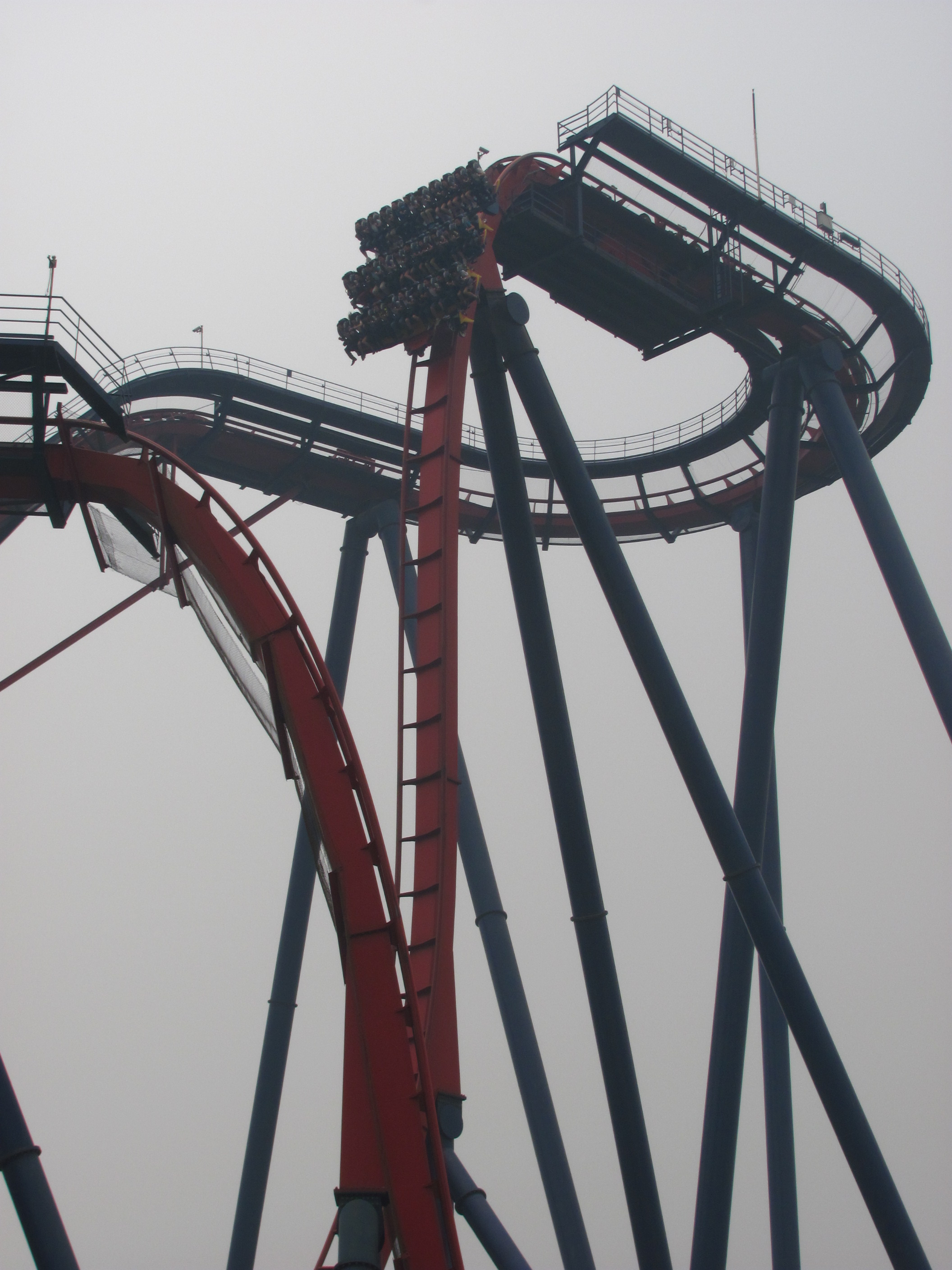
- The first drop of Diving Coaster

Happy Valley Shanghai
- Location: Happy Valley Shanghai
- Coordinates: 31.0979°N 121.2090°E
- Status: Operating
- Opening date: August 16, 2009

General statistics
- Type: Steel – Dive Coaster
- Manufacturer: Bolliger & Mabillard
- Model: Dive Coaster
- Track layout: Twister
- Lift/launch system: Chain lift hill
- Height: 65 m (213 ft)
- Length: 972 m (3,189 ft)
- Speed: 110 km/h (68 mph)
- Inversions: 1
- Duration: 2:20
- Max vertical angle: 90°
- G-force: 4
- Trains: 3 cars. Riders are arranged 10 across in a single row for a total of 30 riders per train.
- Diving Coaster at RCDB

Diving Coaster is a steel Dive Coaster at Happy Valley Shanghai in Songjiang, Shanghai, China. It was manufactured by Bolliger & Mabillard and opened on August 16, 2009.

== Ride experience ==
The layout of the ride is identical to SheiKra at Busch Gardens Tampa Bay.

Once riders are seated and restrained, the train makes a right out of the station and begins to climb the 65-metre (213 ft) lift hill. Once at the top, the train makes a U-turn to the right and comes to a stop by a holding brake, right before dropping. After a few seconds, the train drops and enters an immelmann loop. The train then enters the mid course brake run, drops into a tunnel and makes a right turn, dropping into the splashdown element. Riders then go through a couple turns and dips and enter the final brake run.
