= Bert the Conqueror =

American reality television series

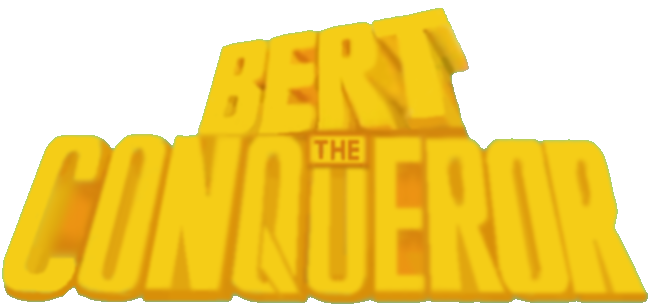
- Starring: Bert Kreischer
- Country of origin: United States
- Original language: English
- No. of seasons: 3
- No. of episodes: 40 (list of episodes)

Original release
- Network: Travel Channel
- Release: June 16, 2010 – August 30, 2016

Bert the Conqueror is an American reality television series which premiered on the Travel Channel on June 16, 2010.

In the show, American stand-up comedian Bert Kreischer travels across the United States to amusement parks and other entertainment venues to experience and promote various roller coasters, water rides, and unusual sports.

On September 24, 2010, Bert the Conqueror was renewed for a second season. The renewal was revealed on the Bert the Conqueror Facebook page the next day. The second season began April 3, 2011.

On the April 29, 2015 episode of his podcast, Kreischer mentioned that "Bert the Conqueror" would begin filming new episodes in the coming months.

On May 9, 2016, it was announced the show would return for a third season, which premiered on June 7, 2016.

== Episodes ==
The first season consisted of 10 episodes, with Kreischer visiting a different U.S. state in each episode. In the premiere of the second season, he visited an amusement park in Connecticut, then went on to Stowe, Vermont to ride a concrete luge course. The conclusion was the Wife Carrying Championship in Camden, Maine, in which he carried his wife across the obstacle course. The second season also had Kreischer visiting locations outside of the United States in Alberta, Canada and Cancun, Mexico.
