= Happy Valley (amusement parks) =

Chinese amusement park chain

- Native name: 欢乐谷
- Industry: Amusement parks
- Founded: Shenzhen, Guangdong (1998)
- Number of locations: 8
- Area served: China
- Owner: Overseas Chinese Town Enterprises
- Website: happyvalley.cn

Happy Valley (Chinese: 欢乐谷; pinyin: Huānlè Gǔ) is a chain of amusement parks located in various cities of China. The first park opened in 1998 in Shenzhen, Guangdong province. Since then seven more amusement parks have opened in Beijing, Chengdu, Shanghai, Wuhan, Tianjin, Chongqing and Nanjing.

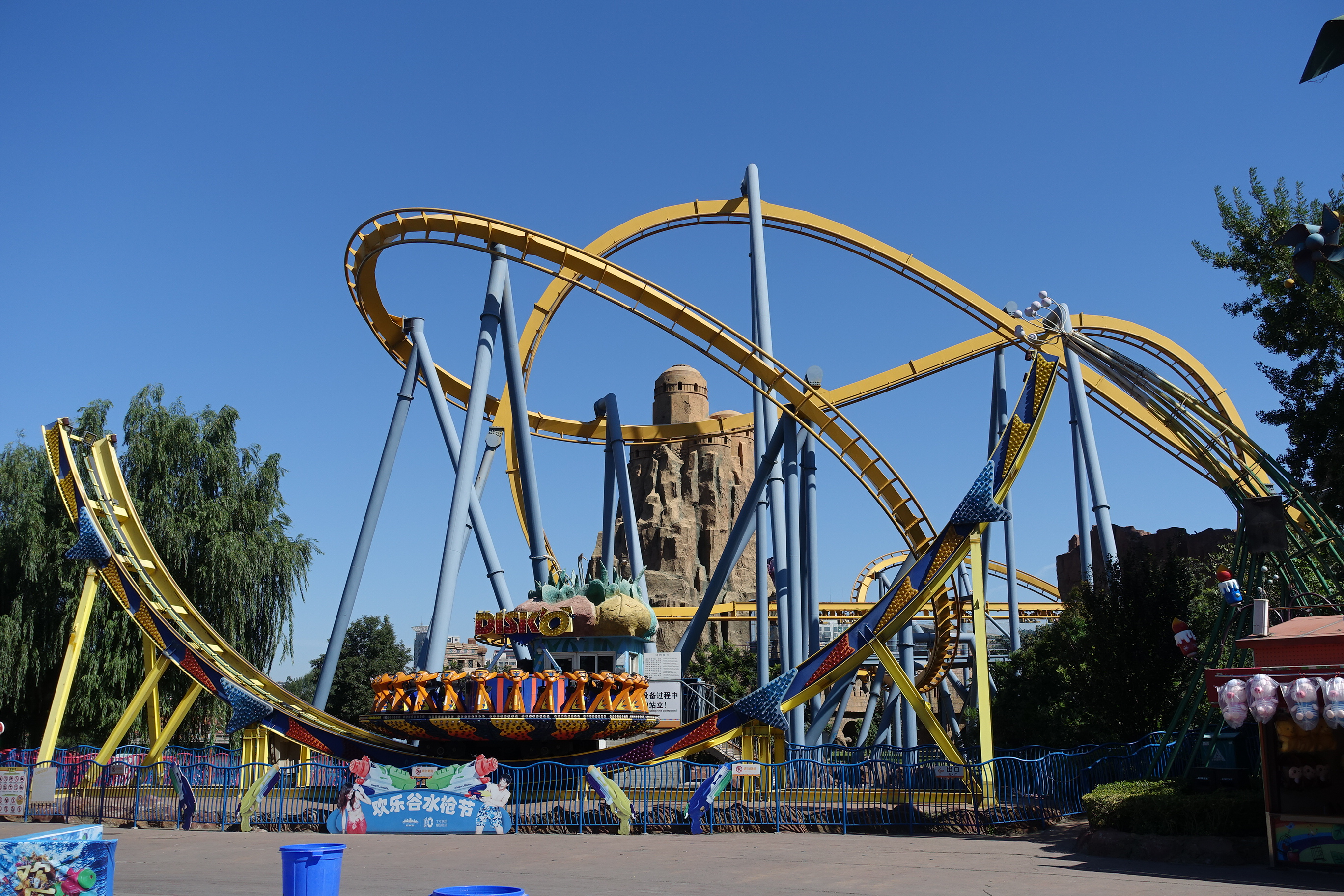
Happy Valley Beijing

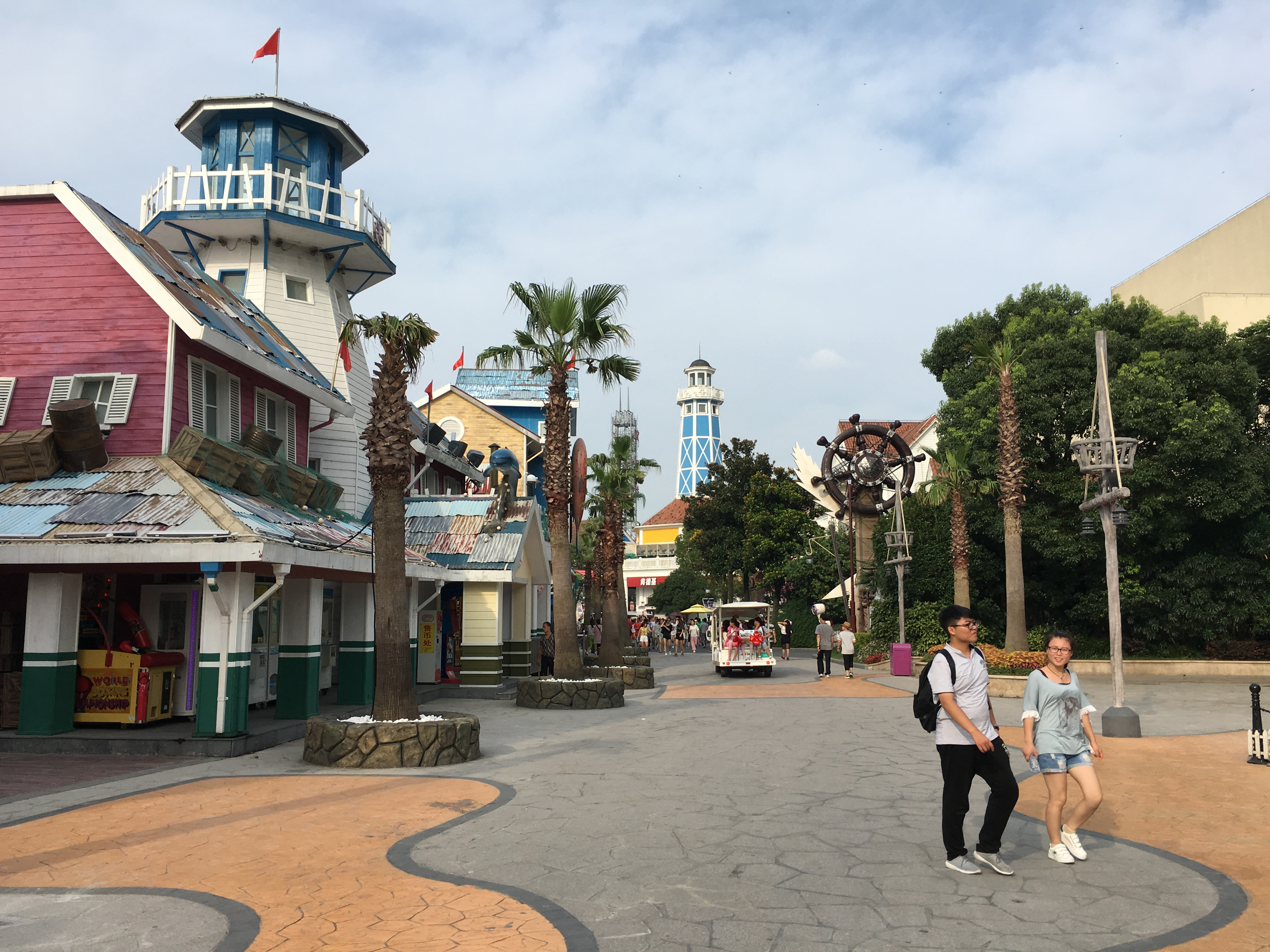
Happy Valley Shanghai

== Locations ==
Park name	Location	Coordinates	Opening date
Happy Valley Shenzhen	Nanshan, Shenzhen, Guangdong	22.546603°N 113.975510°E	1 October 1998
Happy Valley Beijing	Chaoyang, Beijing	39.866418°N 116.488627°E	9 July 2006
Happy Valley Chengdu	Jinniu, Chengdu, Sichuan	30.723521°N 104.032824°E	17 January 2009
Happy Valley Shanghai	Songjiang, Shanghai	31.098714°N 121.211236°E	16 August 2009
Happy Valley Wuhan	Hongshan, Wuhan, Hubei	30.591944°N 114.387222°E	29 April 2012
Happy Valley Tianjin	Dongli, Tianjin	39.188304°N 117.460858°E	27 July 2013
Happy Valley Chongqing	Yubei, Chongqing	29.684553°N 106.508221°E	8 July 2017
Happy Valley Nanjing	Qixia, Nanjing, Jiangsu	32.155354°N 118.993175°E	11 November 2020
Happy Valley Xi'an	Chang'an, Xi'an, Shaanxi	34.2478440°N 108.7340280°E	TBA

== See also ==
- Fantawild, another chain of amusement parks in China
