= Bert Kreischer =

American comedian and actor (born 1972)

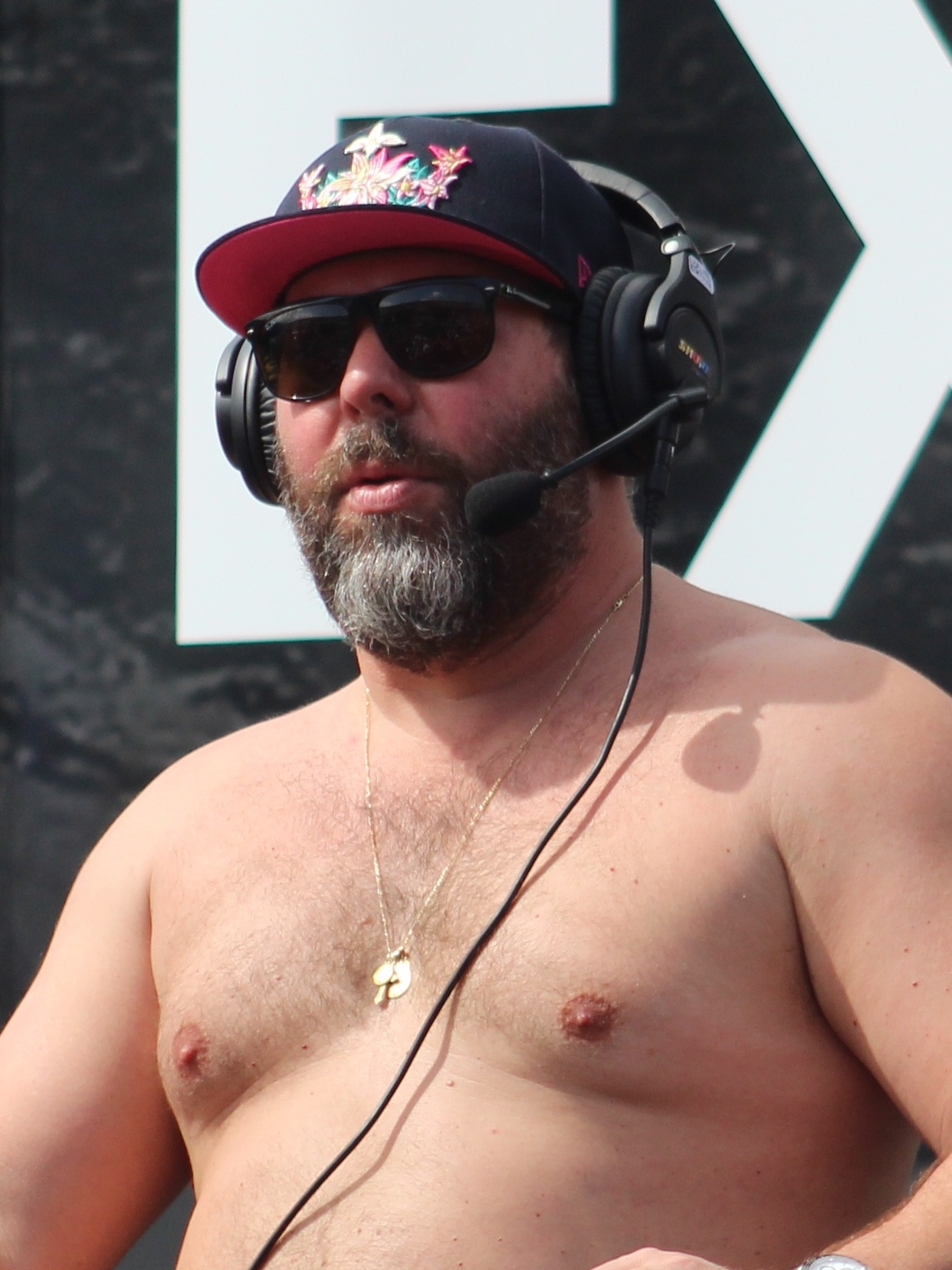
- Kreischer in 2023
- Born: Albert Charles Kreischer Jr. November 3, 1972 (age 54); St. Petersburg, Florida, U.S.
- Spouse: LeeAnn Kreischer
- Children: 2

Comedy career
- Years active: 1997–present
- Medium: Stand-up, film, television
- Genres: Observational comedy, black comedy
- Subjects: Human behavior, human sexuality, American politics, gender differences, weight loss
- Website: www.bertbertbert.com

Albert Charles Kreischer Jr. (born November 3, 1972) is an American stand-up comedian, podcaster, and actor. In 1997, he was featured in an article in Rolling Stone while attending Florida State University. The magazine named Kreischer "the top partyer at the Number One Party School in the country." The article also served as inspiration for the 2002 film National Lampoon's Van Wilder.

Kreischer has served as host of the television series Hurt Bert on FX as well as Bert the Conqueror and Trip Flip on Travel Channel. He starred in the comedy film The Machine (2023). As part of his production company, Berty Boy Productions, Kreischer produces and hosts the podcasts Bertcast and Open Tabs and the cooking show Something’s Burning. He also co-hosts the podcast 2 Bears, 1 Cave with friend and fellow comedian Tom Segura.

== Early life ==
Albert Charles Kreischer Jr. was born November 3, 1972, in St. Petersburg, Florida, and raised in Tampa. His mother worked in early childhood development and his father worked as a successful real-estate attorney. He attended Jesuit High School of Tampa then went on to attend Florida State University (FSU). Kreischer majored in English and was a member of the Alpha Tau Omega fraternity.

In 1997, during Kreischer's sixth year at FSU, the university was ranked number one by The Princeton Review in their annual list of the top "party schools" in the United States. Later that same year Kreischer became the focus of a six-page article in Rolling Stone who named him "the top partyer at the Number One Party School in the country." Titled "Bert Kreischer: The Undergraduate," the article recounted Kreischer's party hijinks, which included bouts of heavy drinking and public nudity. From the Rolling Stone article director Oliver Stone optioned the film rights to Kreischer's life. When the development deal with Oliver Stone fell through, all the scripts that were submitted went back to their writers. One of these writers changed Kreischer's name and sold the script to National Lampoon. This became the basis for the 2002 film National Lampoon's Van Wilder, starring Ryan Reynolds.

When asked about his involvement in the film, Kreischer told the New York Post in 2014: "I've never seen it. I had nothing to do with it." On Joe Rogan's podcast, Kreischer talked about how National Lampoon executives confirmed to him that he was the basis for the film. He also confirmed that he would never sue National Lampoon for having made the movie without his involvement.

== Career ==
=== Stand-up comedy ===
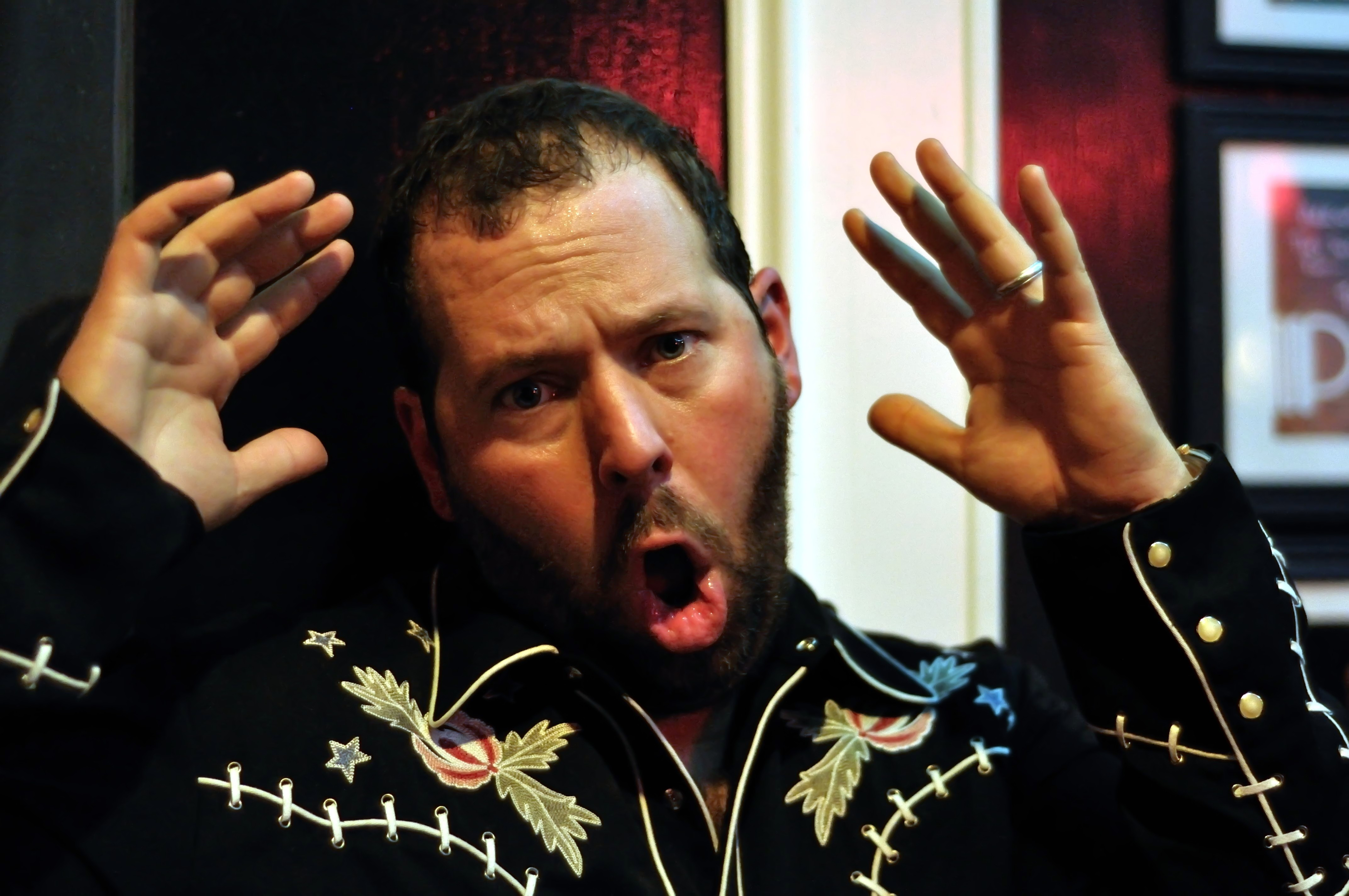
Kreischer in 2012

Kreischer's first experience with stand-up comedy was at Potbelly's, a bar and nightclub in Tallahassee, Florida. Kreischer moved to New York City after a tape of one of his sets was sent to a talent agent who invited him to the city to watch some stand-up shows. Kreischer worked the door at the now-defunct Boston Comedy Club.

Kreischer is known for performing stand-up comedy while shirtless. He is also known for his storytelling; his most popular story is about how he allegedly earned the nickname "The Machine". The story revolves around how he inadvertently helped the Russian mafia rob a train while on a college trip to Russia. A movie adaptation was released on May 26, 2023.

In 2004, Kreischer was featured along with four other comedians on the DVD release National Lampoon Live: New Faces – Volume 2. That same year one of his stories appeared on an episode of the animated Comedy Central series Shorties Watchin' Shorties.

As a stand-up comedian Kreischer has performed internationally and has appeared on late night talk shows Late Show with David Letterman, Jimmy Kimmel Live, and Conan. He also appeared regularly as a guest on Rachael Ray from 2011 to 2015.

His first comedy special Bert Kreischer: Comfortably Dumb appeared on Comedy Central in 2009. Kreischer returned to the network in 2015 for the storytelling series This Is Not Happening, recounting his experience wrestling a bear.

Showtime released Bert Kreischer: The Machine in 2016.

Netflix has subsequently produced four comedy specials, filming Bert Kreischer: Secret Time in Philadelphia, PA released August 2018; filming Bert Kreischer: Hey Big Boy in Cleveland, OH released March 2020; filming Bert Kreischer: Razzle Dazzle in Omaha released March 2023; and filming Bert Kreischer: Lucky in Tampa, FL released March 2025. In 2026, Netflix also produced a series called "Free Bert" produced by Jarrad Paul and Andrew Mogel, where Bert stars as himself settling into Beverly Hills with Arden Myrin co-starring as his wife.

=== Podcasting ===
Kreischer on a podcast in 2022, reacting to voicemails from David Letterman

Kreischer produces and hosts the podcasts Bertcast and Open Tabs and the cooking show Something’s Burning. Bertcast launched in 2012, was previously recorded from his Man Cave that was built for him for an episode of Man Caves, a home improvement reality television program. Kreischer also co-hosts the 2 Bears 1 Cave podcast with Tom Segura.

Kreischer has also been a guest on podcasts such as WTF with Marc Maron, Doug Benson's Doug Loves Movies, H3 Podcast, Your Mom's House and The Joe Rogan Experience.

=== Published works ===
- Kreischer, Bert (2014). Life of the Party: Stories of a Perpetual Man-Child. St. Martin's Press. ISBN 978-1-250-03031-3. - Total pages: 256

=== Other media ===
Within five months of moving to New York City to pursue a career in comedy, Will Smith's production company offered Kreischer a deal for a sitcom. When he was featured on Bert the Conqueror, Kreischer traveled to amusement parks and other entertainment venues across the United States in order to experience thrilling rides and activities. Kreischer, who has a fear of heights, can be seen riding roller coasters and other amusement park rides as well as engaging in activities such as jumping off the Stratosphere tower in Las Vegas and being fired from a human slingshot. While in New York Kreischer attended open mics hosted by TV producer DJ Nash that were also attended by the likes of Demetri Martin, Bobby Kelly and Jim Norton. In 2001 Kreischer also starred in a television pilot based on Nash's life titled Life With David J.

== Personal life ==
Bert and LeeAnn Kreischer were married in December 2003. They welcomed their first child together, daughter Georgia, on June 8, 2004. Three days after her birth, Bert was back on the road doing comedy and he credits his wife for taking care of Georgia while he was away. Their second child, daughter Ila, was born on July 18, 2006. Bert previously shared that Ila has dyslexia and noted that she has a unique way of thinking and responding to people.

== Filmography ==
=== Film ===
Year	Title	Role	Notes	Ref.
2023	The Machine	Himself	Feature film debut	

=== Television ===
Year	Title	Role	Notes	Ref.
2001	Life With David J	Himself	Episode: "Pilot"	
2001–2002	The X Show	Himself (host)	FX series	
2004	The Shield	Alfred	Episode: "Cracking Ice"	
2004	Hurt Bert	Himself (host)	FX series	
2010–2011, 2016	Bert the Conqueror	Himself (host)	Travel Channel reality show	
2012–2015	Trip Flip	Himself (host)	Travel Channel series	
2017	The Loud House	Rip Hardcore (voice)	Episode: "Mall of Duty"	
2020	The Cabin with Bert Kreischer	Himself	5 episodes	
2024	The Roast of Tom Brady	Himself	Roaster with Tom Segura	
2026	Free Bert	Himself	Netflix series	

=== Specials ===
Year	Title	Label
2009	Comfortably Dumb	Showtime
2016	The Machine	Showtime
2018	Secret Time	Netflix
2020	Hey Big Boy	Netflix
2023	Razzle Dazzle	Netflix
2025	Lucky	Netflix

=== Appearances ===
Year	Title	Notes
2004	National Lampoon Live: New Faces – Volume Two	segment
2015–2017	This Is Not Happening	2 episodes
