= Happy Valley Shanghai =

Amusement park in Shanghai, China

- Interactive map of Happy Valley Shanghai
- Location: Shanghai, China
- Coordinates: 31.0983°N 121.2137°E
- Status: Operating
- Opened: August 16, 2009

Attractions
- Roller coasters: 7
- Website: sh.happyvalley.cn

Happy Valley Shanghai (Chinese: 上海欢乐谷; pinyin: Shànghǎi Huānlè Gǔ) is an amusement park in Shanghai, China. The park is located in Songjiang District, approximately 40 kilometers (25 mi) from downtown Shanghai. It covers an area of 863,500 square metres (213.4 acres). Opened on August 16, 2009, it is the fourth installation of the Happy Valley theme park chain.

== Notable rides ==
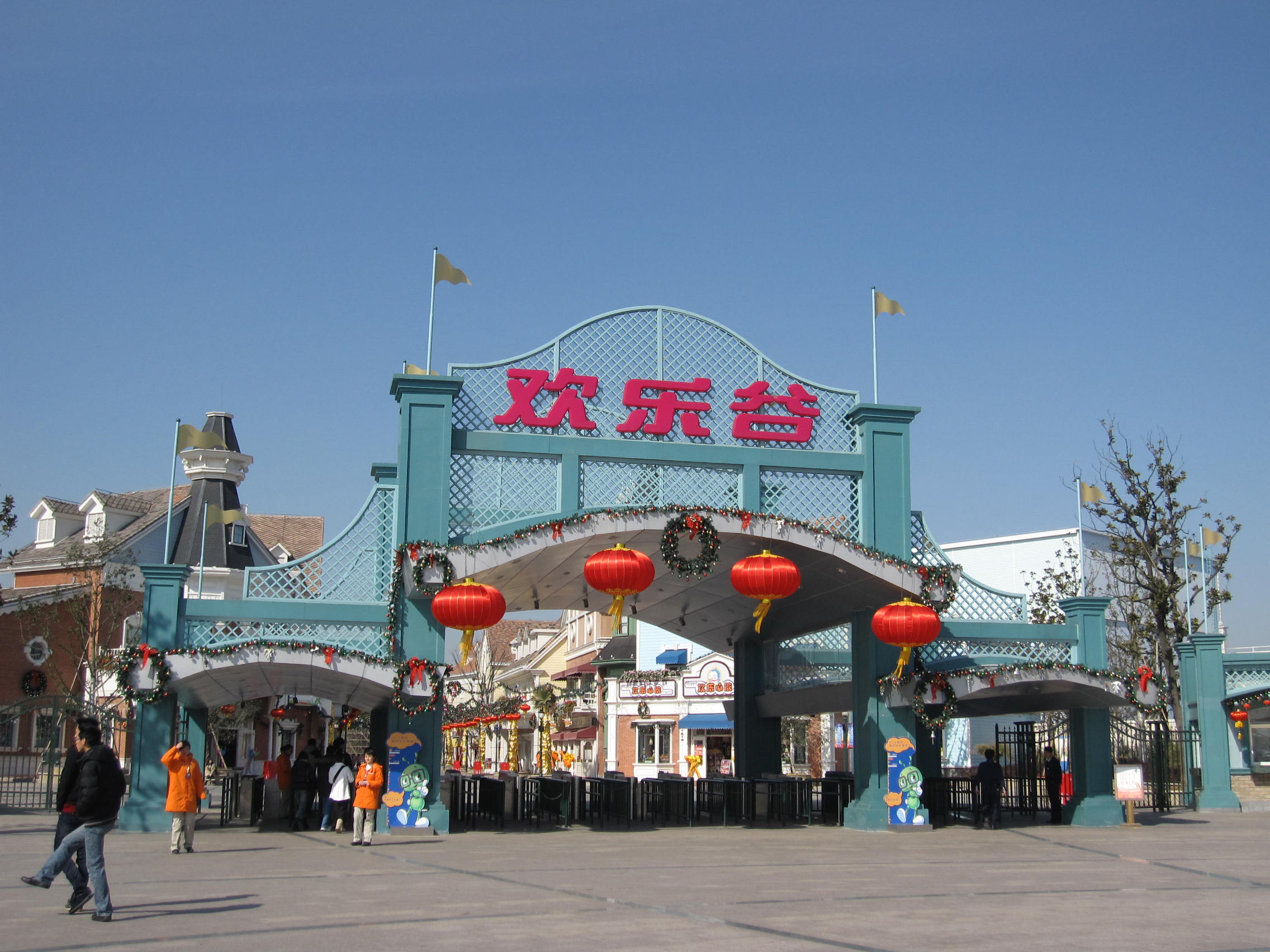
Park entrance

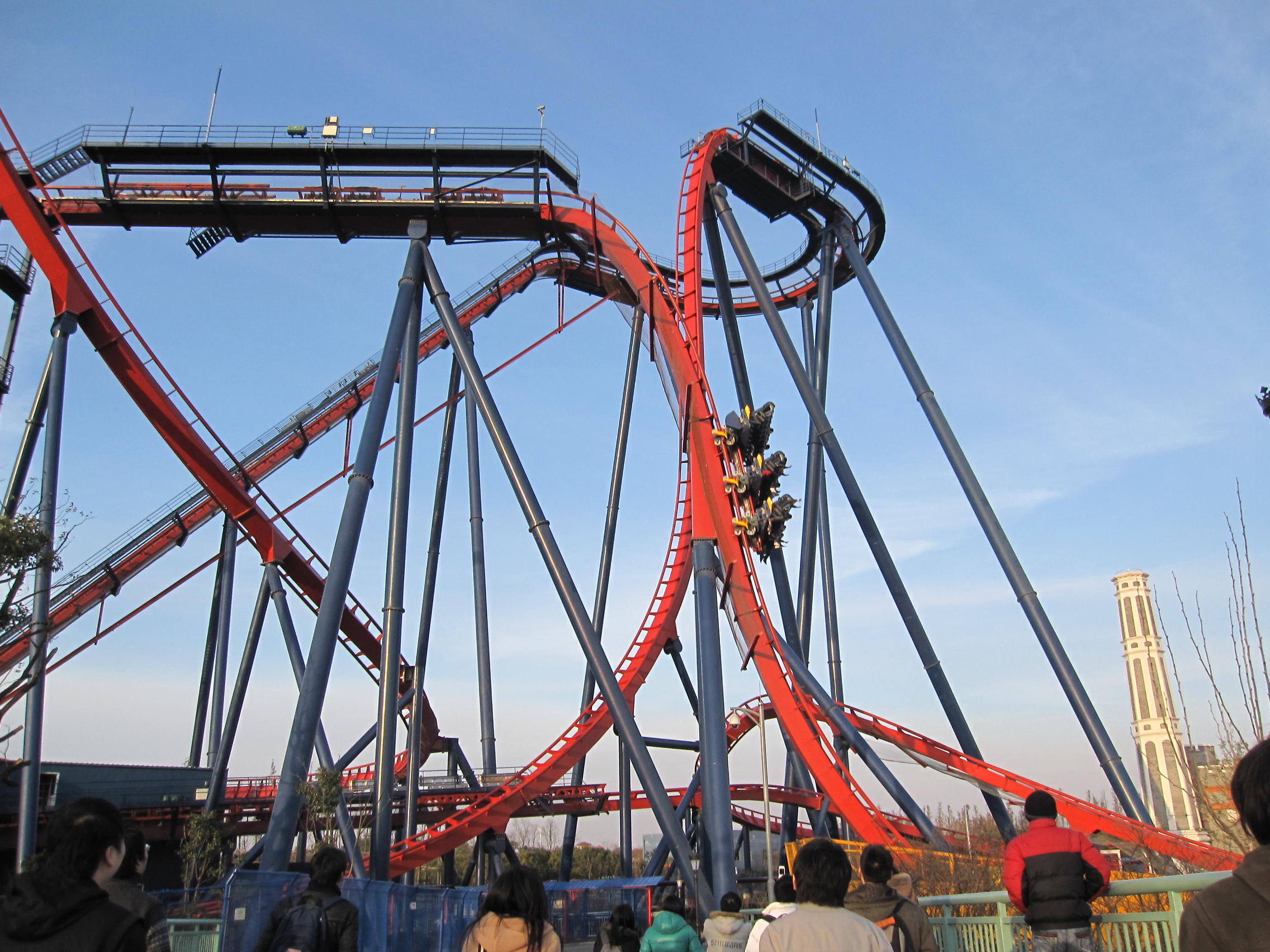
Diving Coaster

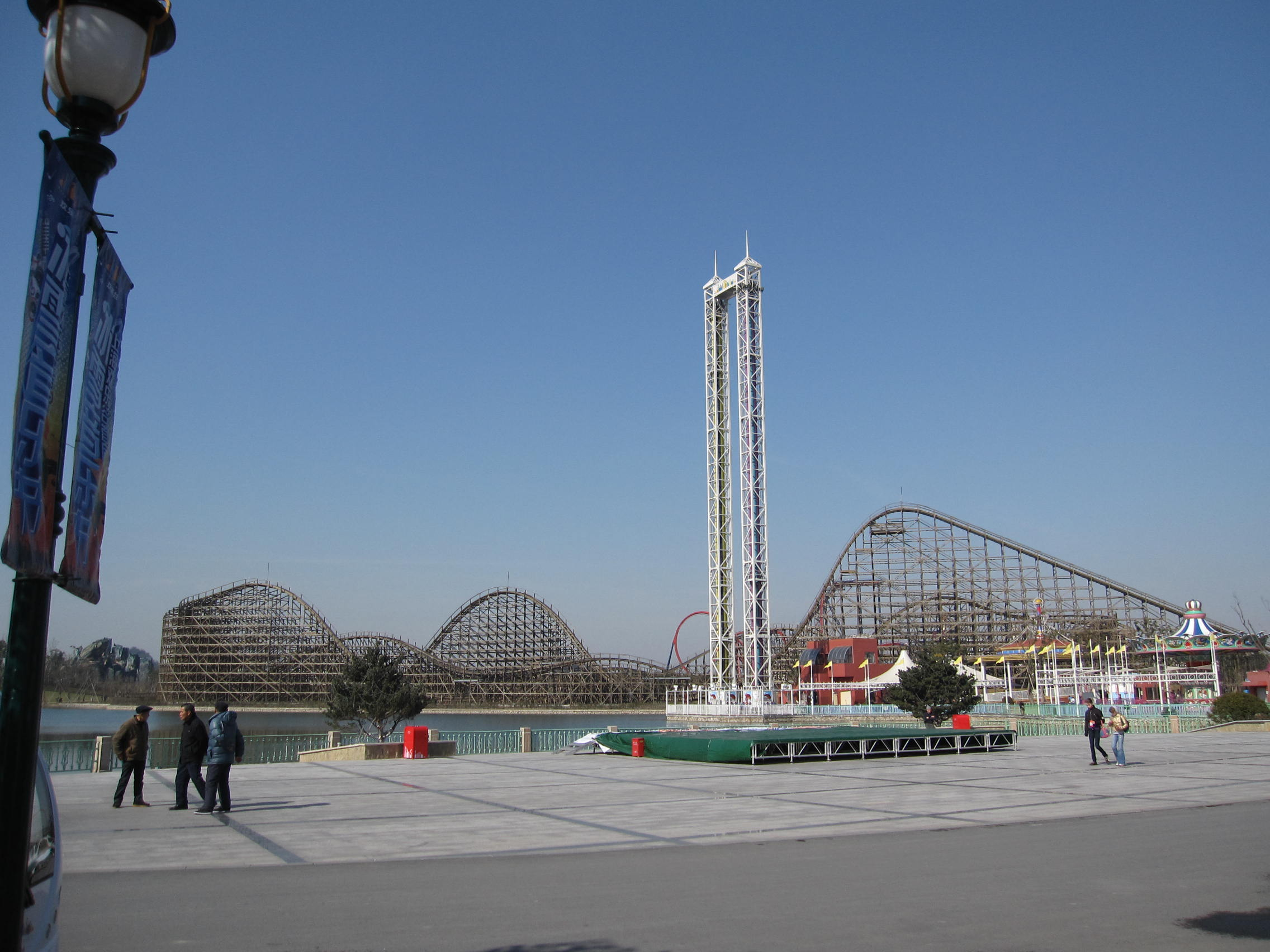
Wooden Coaster - Fireball

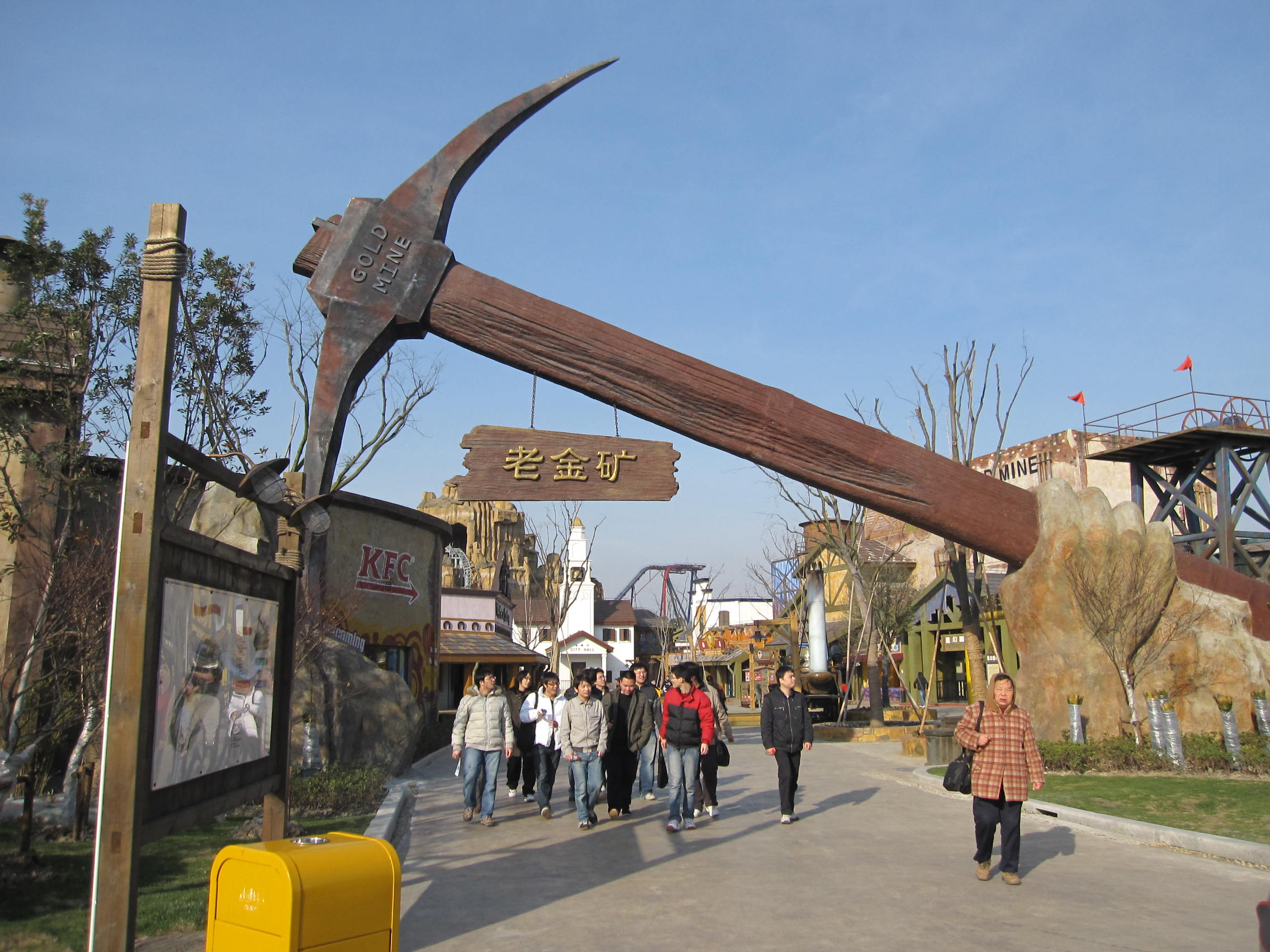
Gold Mine Town

Happy Valley Shanghai contains seven major areas, each with different themed zones, including Sunshine Beach, Happy Times, Typhoon Bay, Gold Mine Town, Ant Kingdom, Shanghai Beach and Shangri-la Woods. There are more than 100 attractions in the park. Notable rides include:

Name	Type	Manufacturer	Model	Opened	Other statistics
Diving Coaster	Steel – Dive	Bolliger & Mabillard	Dive Coaster	August 16, 2009	Length: 3,179.2 ft (969.0 m); Height: 213.3 ft (65.0 m); Inversions: 1
Coastal Ant; Formerly LeLe's Chariot	Steel – Family	Jinma Rides	Space Car (TKC-12B) / Large	August 16, 2009	Unknown
Mega-Lite	Steel	Intamin	Mega-Lite	August 16, 2009	Length: 2,477 ft (755 m); Height: 101.7 ft (31.0 m); Drop: 98.4 ft (30.0 m); Speed: 52.8 mph (85.0 km/h)
Mine Train Coaster	Steel – Mine Train	Intamin	Mine Train Coaster	October 2009	Height: 60.7 ft (18.5 m); Speed: 40.4 mph (65.0 km/h); Duration: 1:10
Crazy Elves; Formerly Spinning Coaster	Steel – Spinning – Wild Mouse	Zamperla	Twister Coaster 420STD	August 16, 2009	Length: 1,377.9 ft (420.0 m); Height: 42.7 ft (13.0 m); Speed: 29.1 mph (46.8 km/h)
Wooden Coaster - Fireball	Wood	Martin & Vleminckx	Wood Coaster	August 16, 2009	Length: 3,819 ft (1,164 m); Height: 108.3 ft (33.0 m); Drop: 103.5 ft (31.5 m); Speed: 56 mph (90 km/h)
Family Inverted Coaster	Steel – Inverted – Family	Bolliger & Mabillard	Inverted Coaster	2014	Length: 1,328.8 ft (405.0 m); Height: 65.6 ft (20.0 m); Speed: 30.4 mph (48.9 km/h)

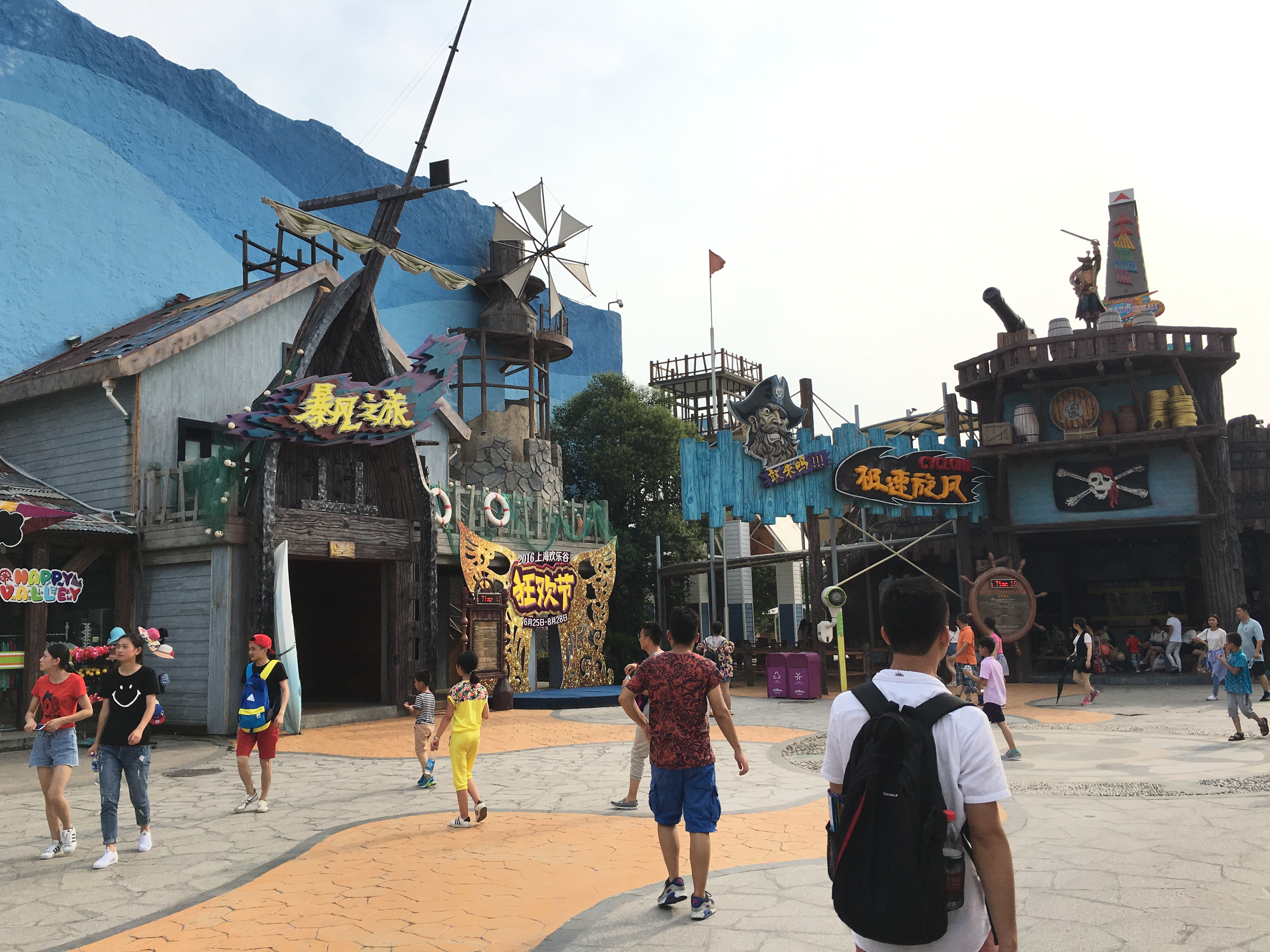

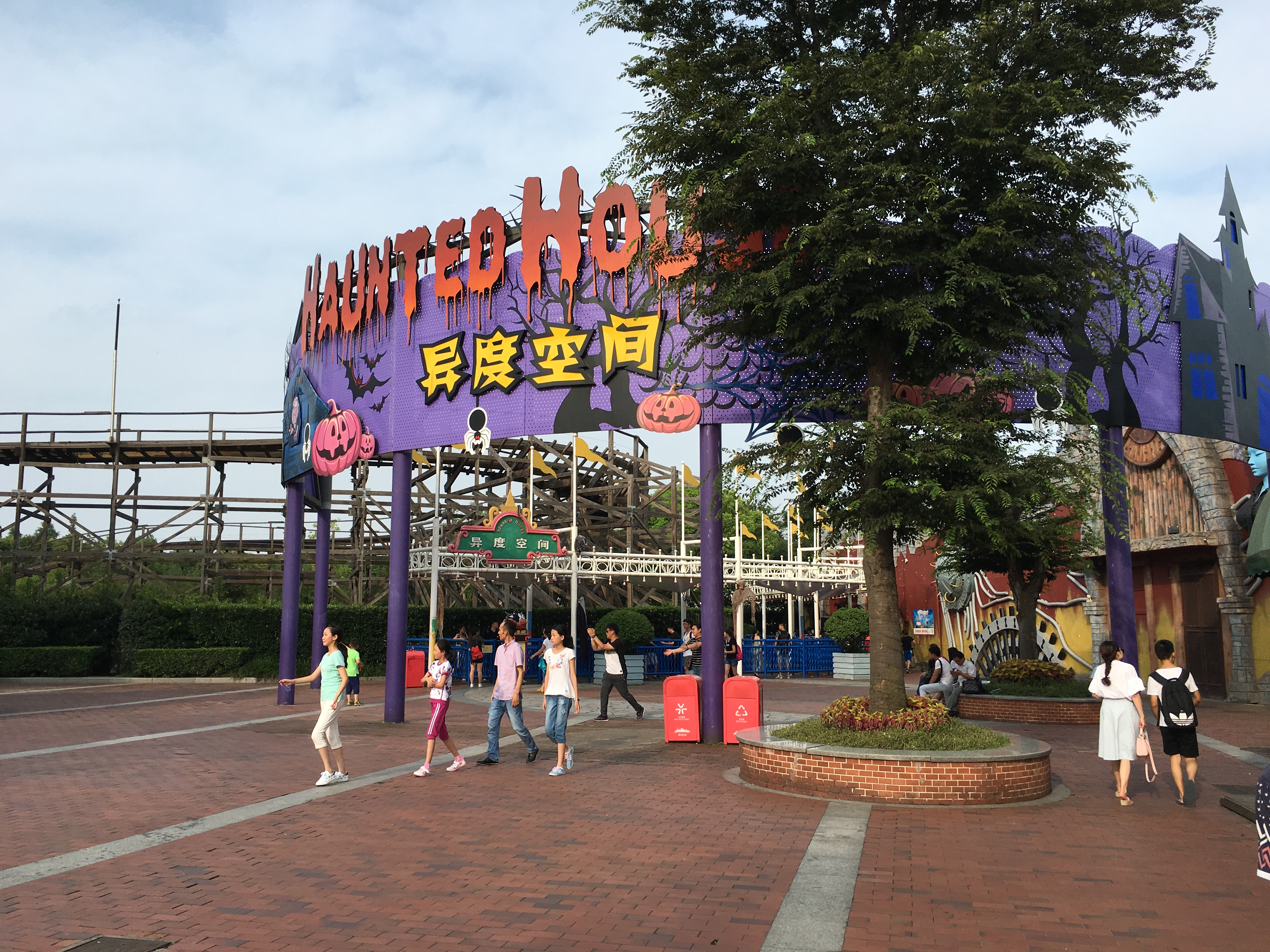

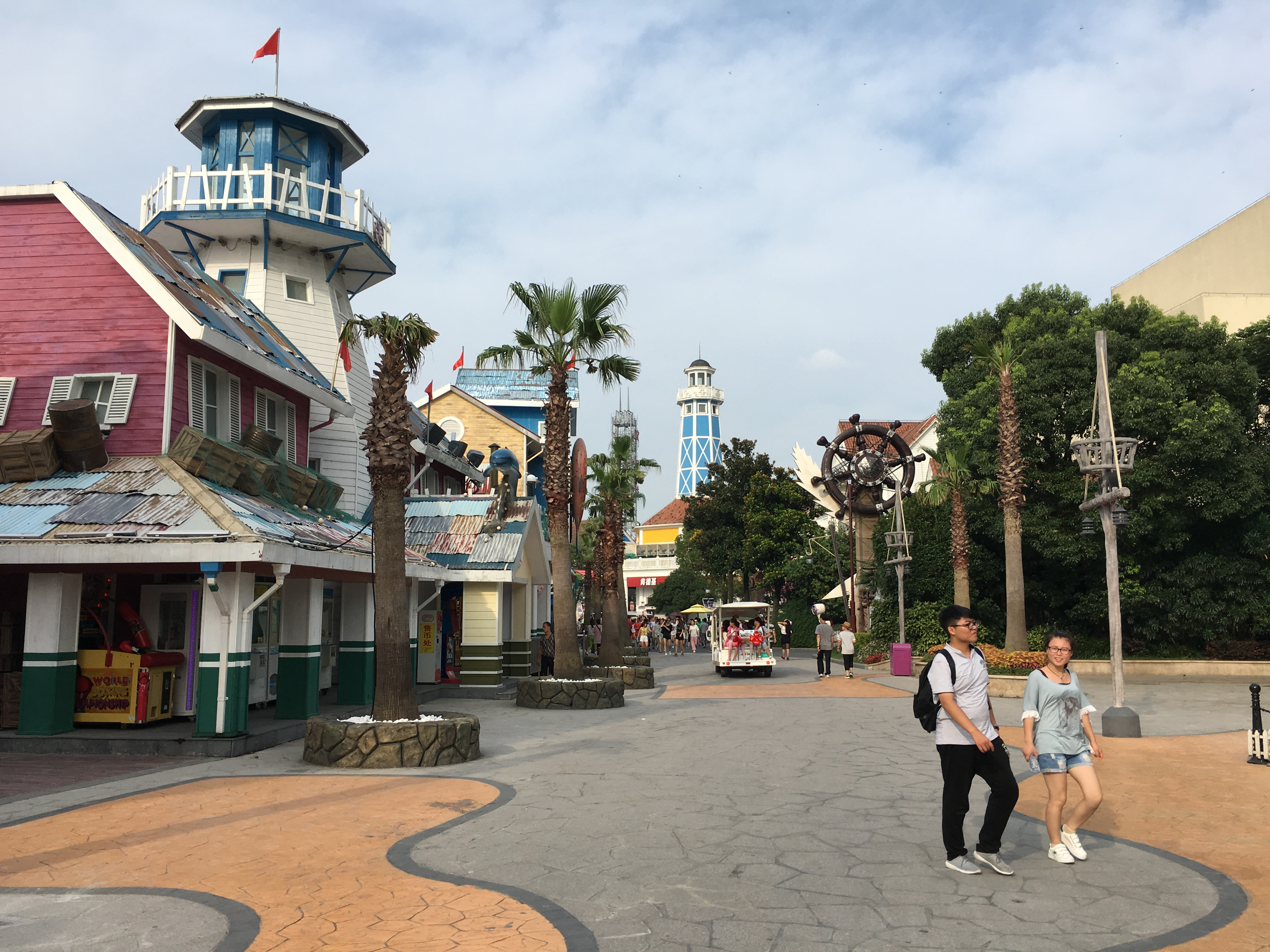

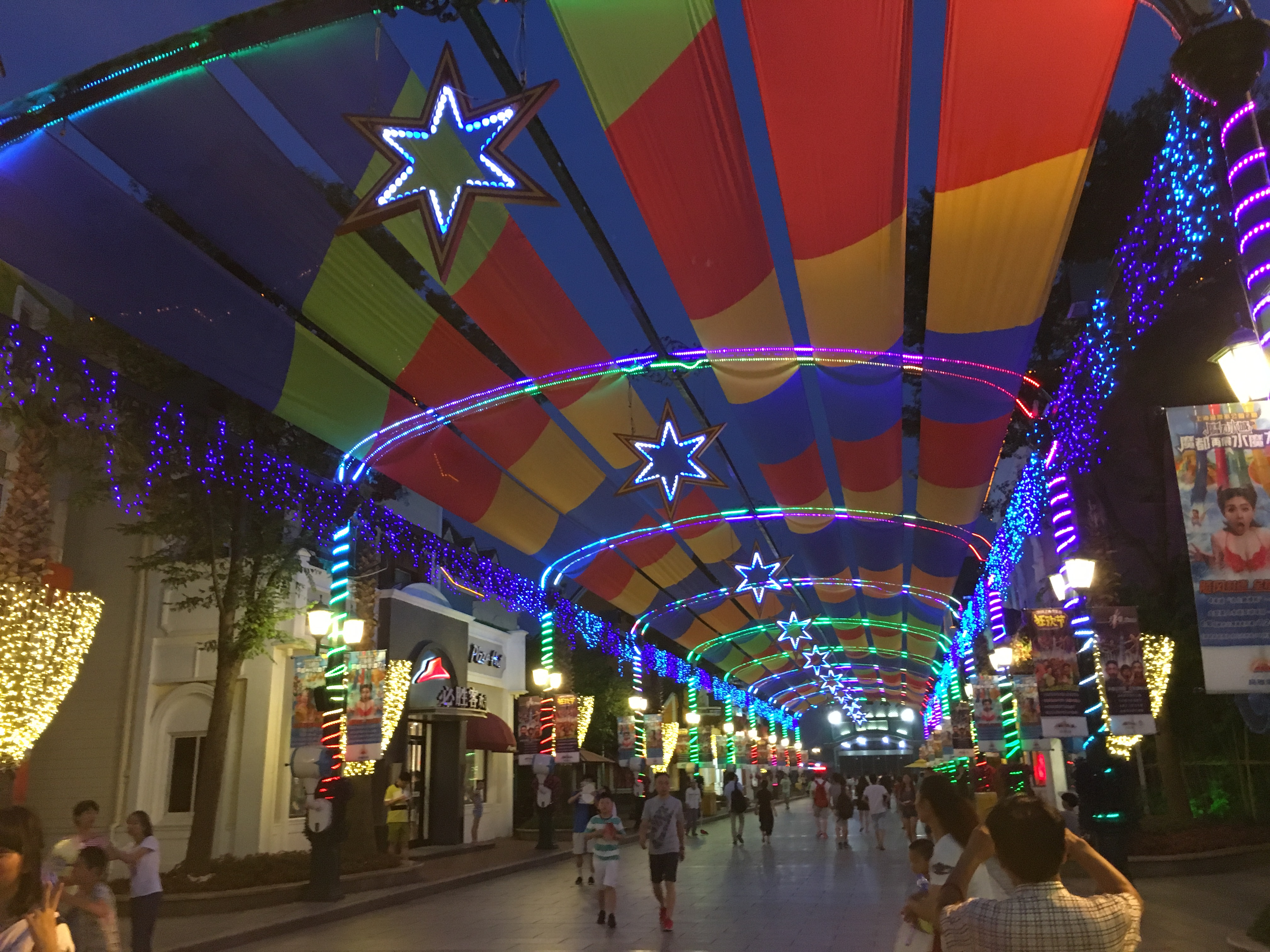

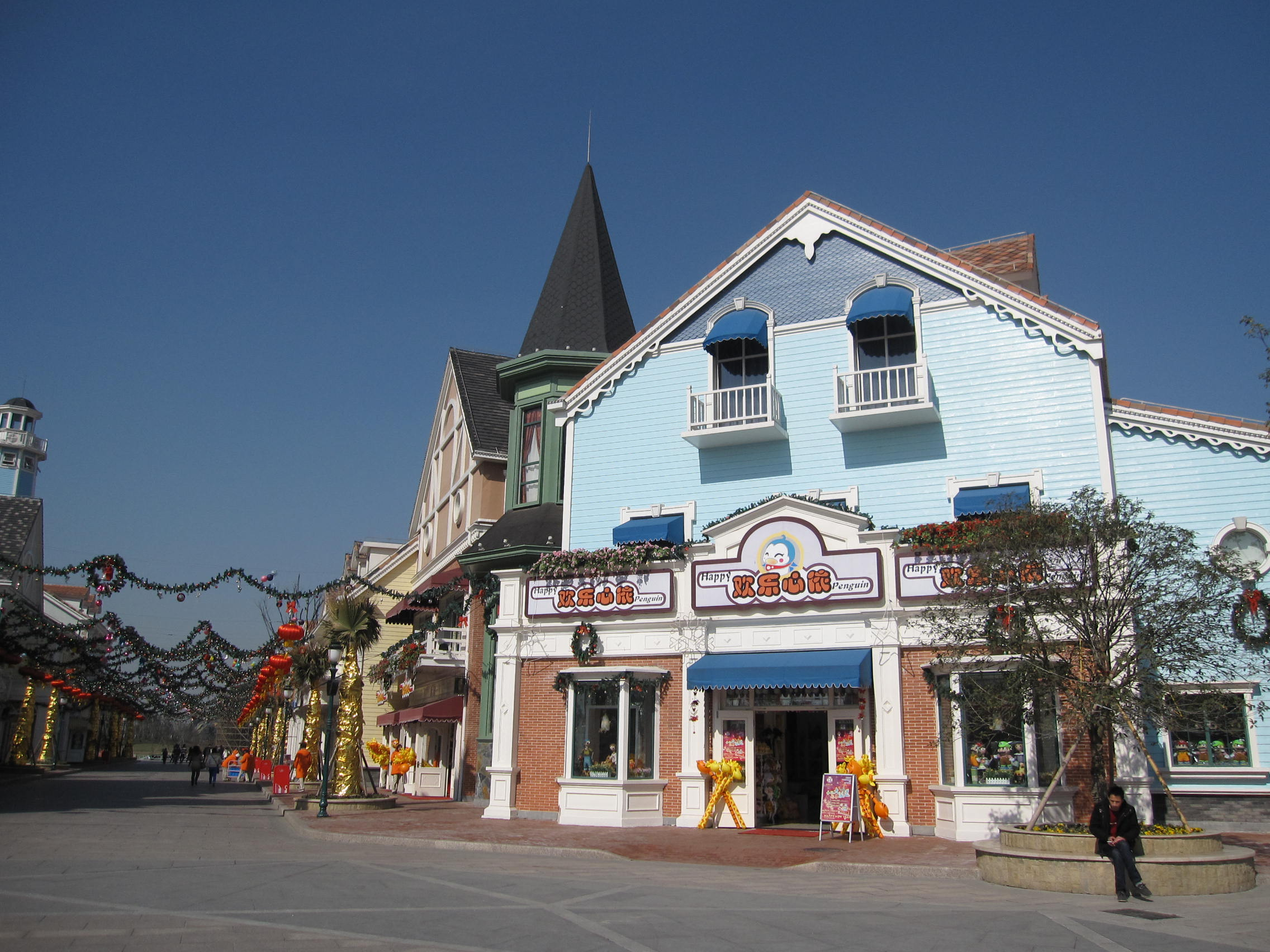
