= Arkham Asylum (disambiguation) =

Arkham Asylum is a fictional place in DC Comics comic books, commonly in stories featuring Batman.

Arkham Asylum may also refer to:

- Arkham Asylum: A Serious House on Serious Earth, a Batman graphic novel
- Batman: Arkham Asylum, a video game
- Arkham Asylum (rollercoaster), in Australia
- Batman: Arkham Asylum (roller coaster), in Spain

== See also ==
- Batman: Arkham, a series of video games
- Gotham City Gauntlet: Escape from Arkham Asylum, a rollercoaster in the U.S.
