= Movie World Studios =

Themed land at Parque Warner Madrid

- Interactive map of Movie World Studios
- Coordinates: 40.2312°N 3.5925°W
- Theme: 20th Century Art Deco/Mission street
- Area: 17.79 acres (7.20 ha)

Attractions
- Roller coasters: 1
- Water rides: 1
- Other rides: 2
- Shows: 2

Parque Warner Madrid
- Status: Operating
- Opened: 6 April 2002; 23 years ago

Movie World Studios is a themed land at Parque Warner Madrid in San Martín de la Vega, near Madrid, Spain. Though named for the real-life studio Movie World Studios that is situated near Warner Bros. Movie World, the "land" represents a backlot from the Golden Age of Hollywood, when Warner Bros. was first founded. 1930s Golden Age theming is the inspiration of the area in addition to the Brownstone town homes of New York City, and attractions such a backlot of a typical Hollywood studio are themed to this concept.

Attractions include Hotel Embrujado and the Police Academy Stunt Show, which opened with the park in 2002 and is based on the Warner Bros. film Police Academy, Cine Tour, inspired by scenic California, and a Yogi Bear themed water ride.

Movie World Studios was the third themed land of the theme park to be completed, behind Hollywood Boulevard and Cartoon Village, construction was completed in December 2001.

== Attractions and entertainment ==
- Police Academy Stunt Show
- Stunt Fall
- Oso Yogui
- Hotel Embrujado
- Cine Tour

== Restaurants and refreshments ==
- Buzz's Gas
- Jack's Fish Market
- Dockside Drinks
- Casa Del Sol
- Studio Cafe
- The Sweet Shop Candy Studios
