= Superman: La Atracción de Acero =

Steel floorless roller coaster

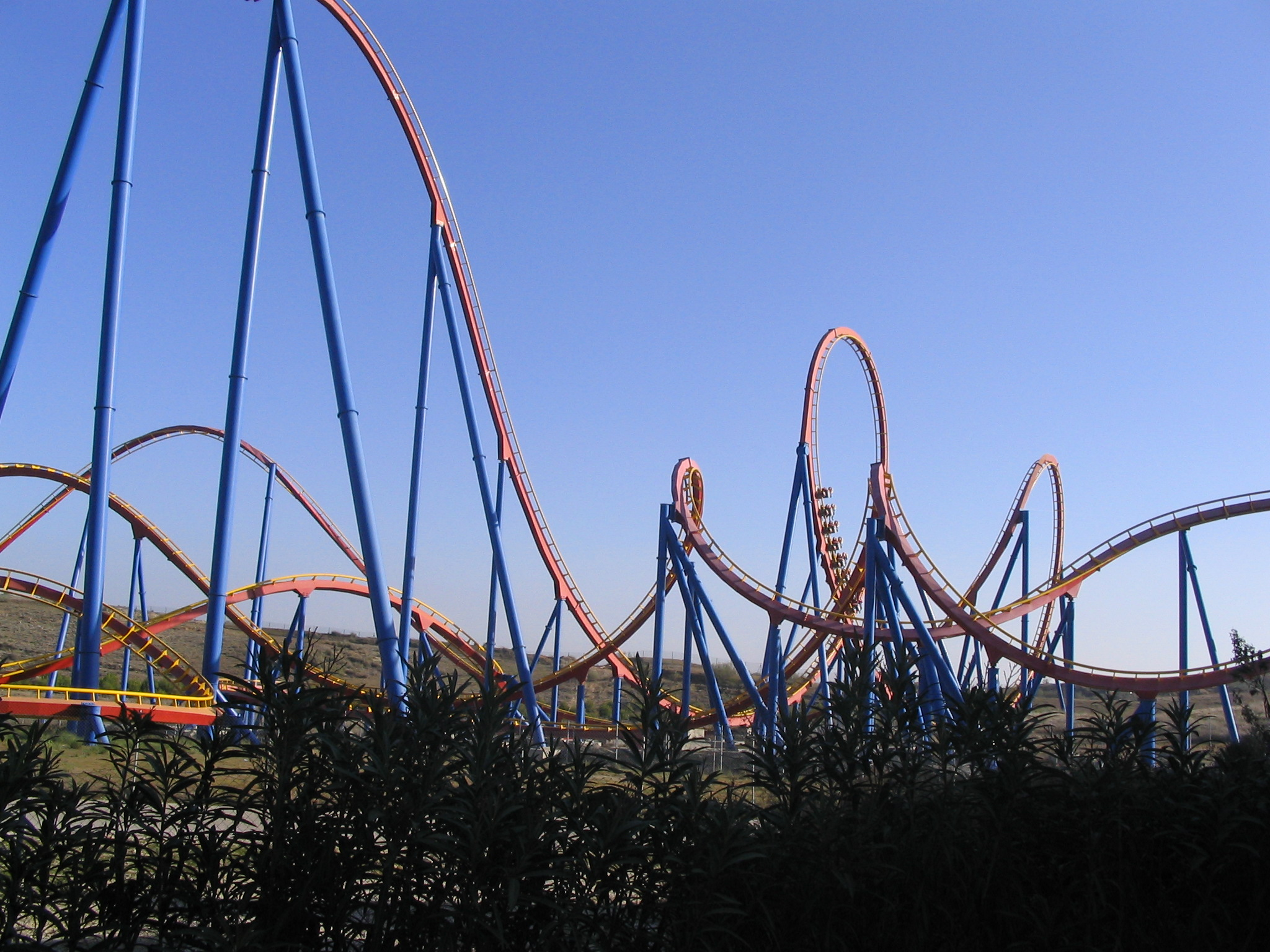
- Superman: La Atraccion de Acero in Spain

Parque Warner Madrid
- Location: Parque Warner Madrid
- Park section: DC Super Heroes World
- Coordinates: 40.227724°N 3.590616°W
- Status: Operating
- Opening date: 6 April 2002; 24 years ago

General statistics
- Type: Steel – Floorless Coaster
- Manufacturer: Bolliger & Mabillard
- Model: Floorless Coaster
- Height: 164.1 ft (50.0 m)
- Length: 3,608.9 ft (1,100.0 m)
- Speed: 62.1 mph (99.9 km/h)
- Inversions: 7
- Duration: 2:26
- Height restriction: 52 in (132 cm)
- Trains: 2 trains with 8 cars; riders arranged 4 across in a single row for a total of 32 riders per train
- Superman: La Atracción de Acero at RCDB

Superman: La Atracción de Acero (meaning Superman: The Attraction of Steel) is a steel floorless roller coaster at Parque Warner Madrid in Spain.

== Design ==
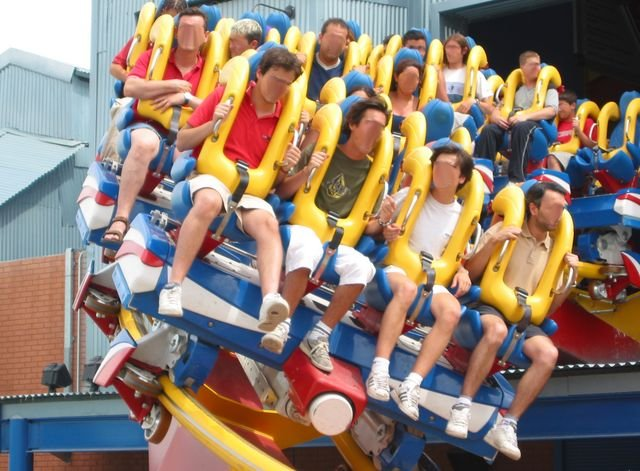
One of the trains exiting the station.

The ride was built by Bolliger & Mabillard and opened on 6 April 2002. It features 7 inversions: a Vertical Loop, an Immelmann, a Zero-G-Roll, a Cobra Roll and two interlocking Flatspins. It features a straight drop, instead of a swooping drop like on most B&M looping coasters.

== Theming ==
The ride is themed to the DC Comics superhero Superman, as such the ride's queue resembles an office of the fictional newspaper agency Daily Planet. Throughout the station building there are covers of famous Superman comics and posters talking about the hero's powers and abilities.

== In popular culture ==
In 2015, the coaster was featured in Glenn Paton's short film H Positive. Although the off-ride footage was modified to include several additional vertical loops, the on-ride footage in the film was left largely intact. The entire layout can be seen, several other attractions can be seen in the background, including Shadows of Arkham, Coaster-Express, Stunt Fall, and La Venganza del Enigma.
