= Scream (roller coaster) =

Steel roller coaster

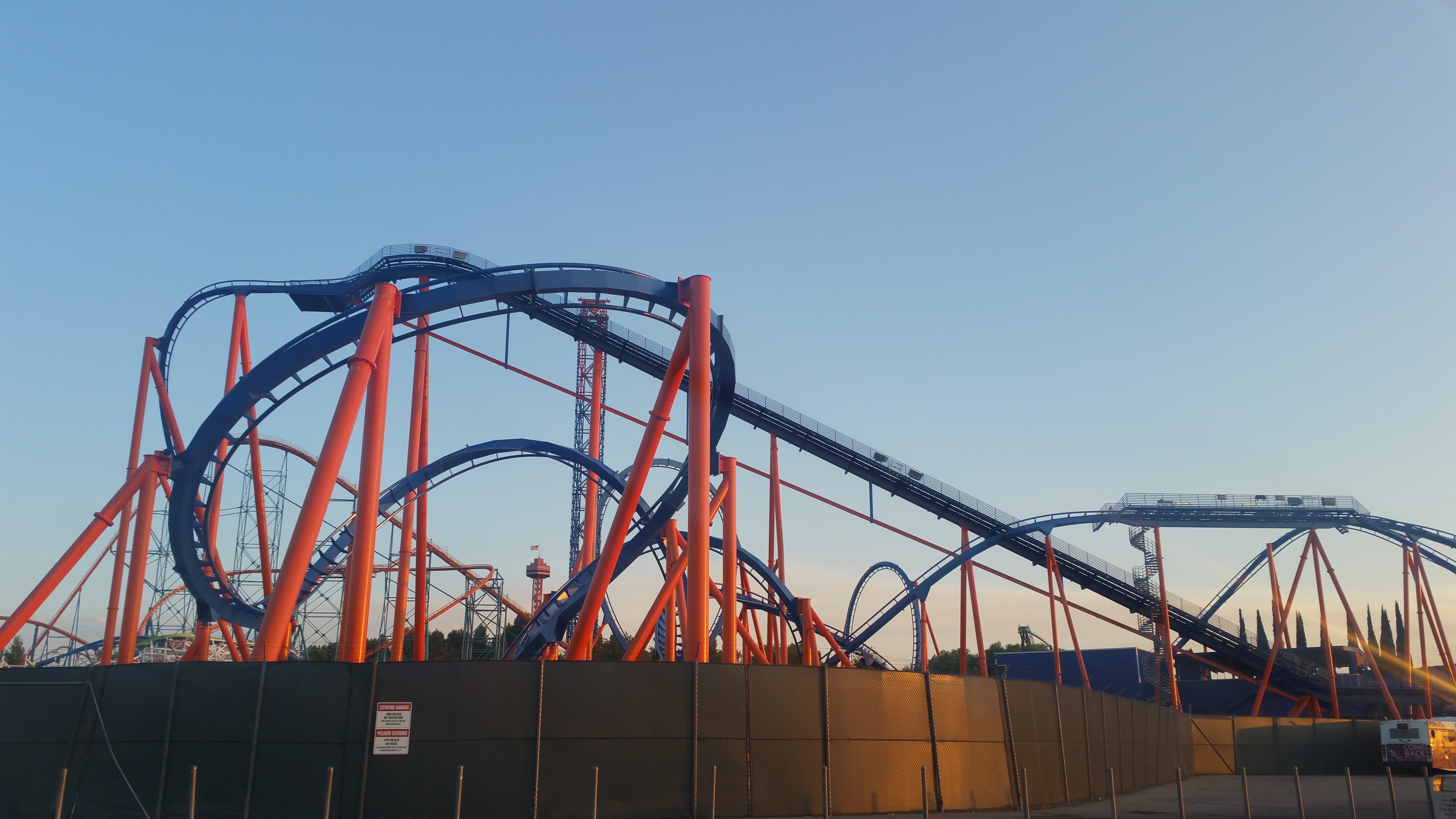
- Scream in 2017

Six Flags Magic Mountain
- Location: Six Flags Magic Mountain
- Park section: Screampunk District
- Coordinates: 34°25′43″N 118°35′54″W
- Status: Operating
- Opening date: April 12, 2003

General statistics
- Type: Steel
- Manufacturer: Bolliger & Mabillard
- Designer: Werner Stengel
- Model: Floorless Coaster
- Lift/launch system: Chain lift hill
- Height: 150 ft (46 m)
- Drop: 141 ft (43 m)
- Length: 3,985 ft (1,215 m)
- Speed: 63 mph (101 km/h)
- Inversions: 7
- Duration: 3:00
- Capacity: 1,440 riders per hour
- G-force: 4
- Height restriction: 54 in (137 cm)
- Trains: 3 trains with 8 cars. Riders are arranged 4 across in a single row for a total of 32 riders per train.
- Fast Lane available
- Must transfer from wheelchair
- Scream at RCDB

Scream (originally stylized as Scream!) is a steel roller coaster at Six Flags Magic Mountain. Manufactured by Bolliger & Mabillard, the Floorless Coaster model was the park's sixteenth roller coaster and is located in the Screampunk District area of the park. The 150-foot-tall (46 m) ride consists of a series of roller coaster elements including seven inversions ranging from a zero-g roll to interlocking corkscrews. The ride is a mirror image of Medusa at Six Flags Great Adventure.

== History ==
In 1999, Six Flags Great Adventure spent $42 million on new attractions including a prototype Floorless Coaster, Medusa, developed and built by Bolliger & Mabillard. The immediate popularity of the ride led to several parks installing Floorless Coasters in the early 2000s.

In November 2002, parts for Scream began arriving at Six Flags Magic Mountain. On November 14, 2002, the park officially announced that they would be adding Scream for the 2003 season, making it the park's sixteenth roller coaster. According to the park, the ride was added to fill the "missing link to our coaster collection". After five months construction, Scream officially opened to the public on April 12, 2003.

On April 9, 2004, a park employee was killed when they were hit by one of Scream's trains during an after-hours test run. According to a statement issued by the park, the employee "deviated from safety training procedures and walked underneath the ride". The ride was closed immediately pending clearance by the California Occupational Safety and Health Administration. The administration cleared the ride for operation within two weeks.

In 2015, the coaster received a brand new color scheme of blue track and orange supports for the opening of Twisted Colossus.

== Characteristics ==
=== Statistics ===
The 3,985-foot-long (1,215 m) Scream stands 150 feet (46 m) tall. With a top speed of 63 miles per hour (101 km/h), the ride features seven inversions including a 128-foot-tall (39 m) vertical loop, a 96-foot-tall (29 m) dive loop, a zero-g roll, a 78-foot-tall (24 m) cobra roll and two interlocking corkscrews. Although the ride is a mirrored clone of the first Floorless Coaster (Medusa at Six Flags Great Adventure), they feature a slight difference in height of about 8 feet (2.4 m) and a difference in speed of 2 miles per hour (3.2 km/h).

=== Trains ===
Scream operates with three floorless trains. Each train seats 32 riders in eight rows of four. This gives the ride a theoretical capacity of 1,440 riders per hour. The open-air trains feature seats which leave riders' legs dangling above the track. Riders are restrainted with over-the-shoulder restraints. As the trains are floorless, the station has a retractable floor for safe boarding. The third train of the ride is painted blue and orange.

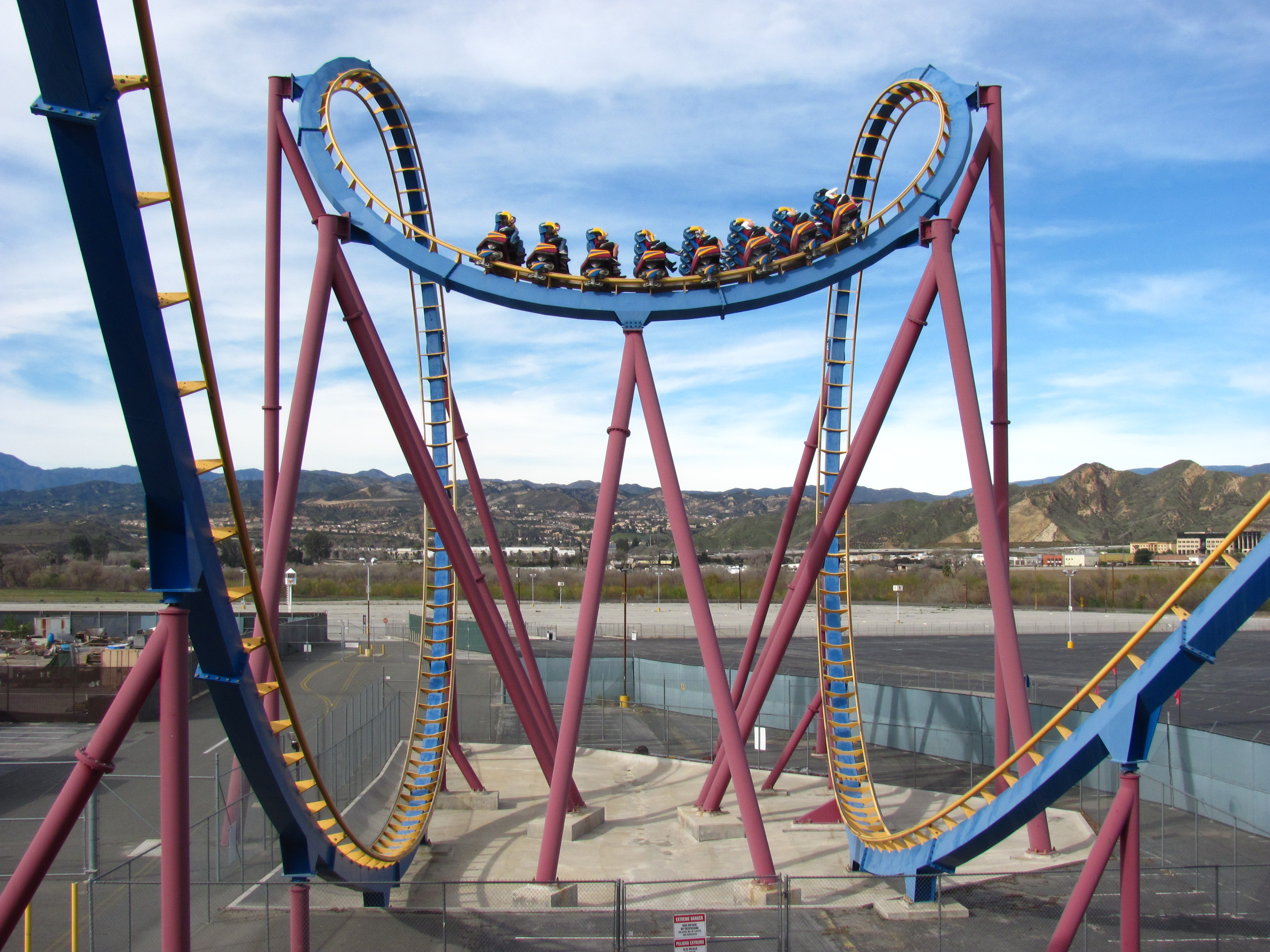
One of Scream's trains navigating the cobra roll

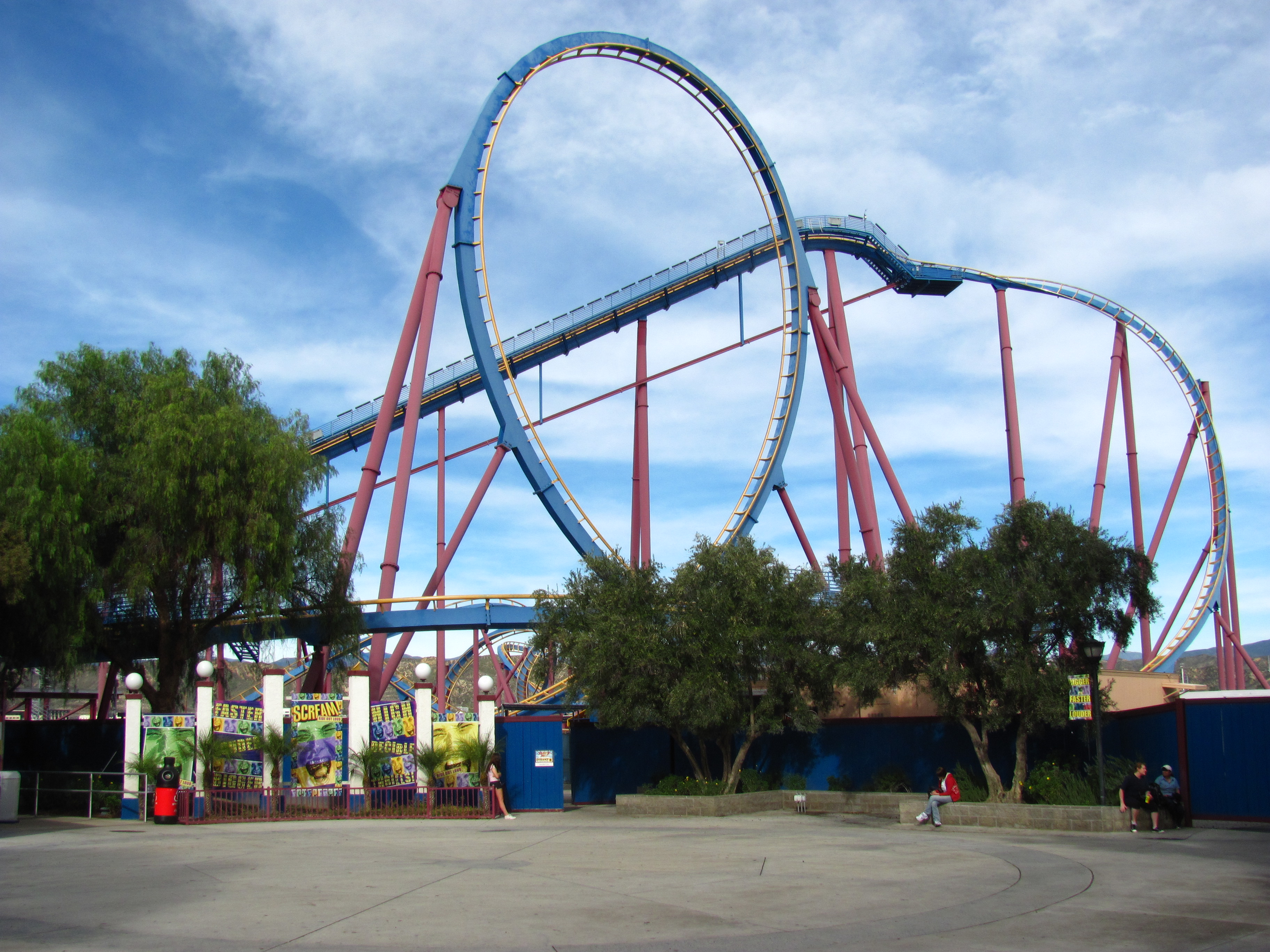
Scream's lift hill and vertical loop, as seen from the ride's entrance plaza

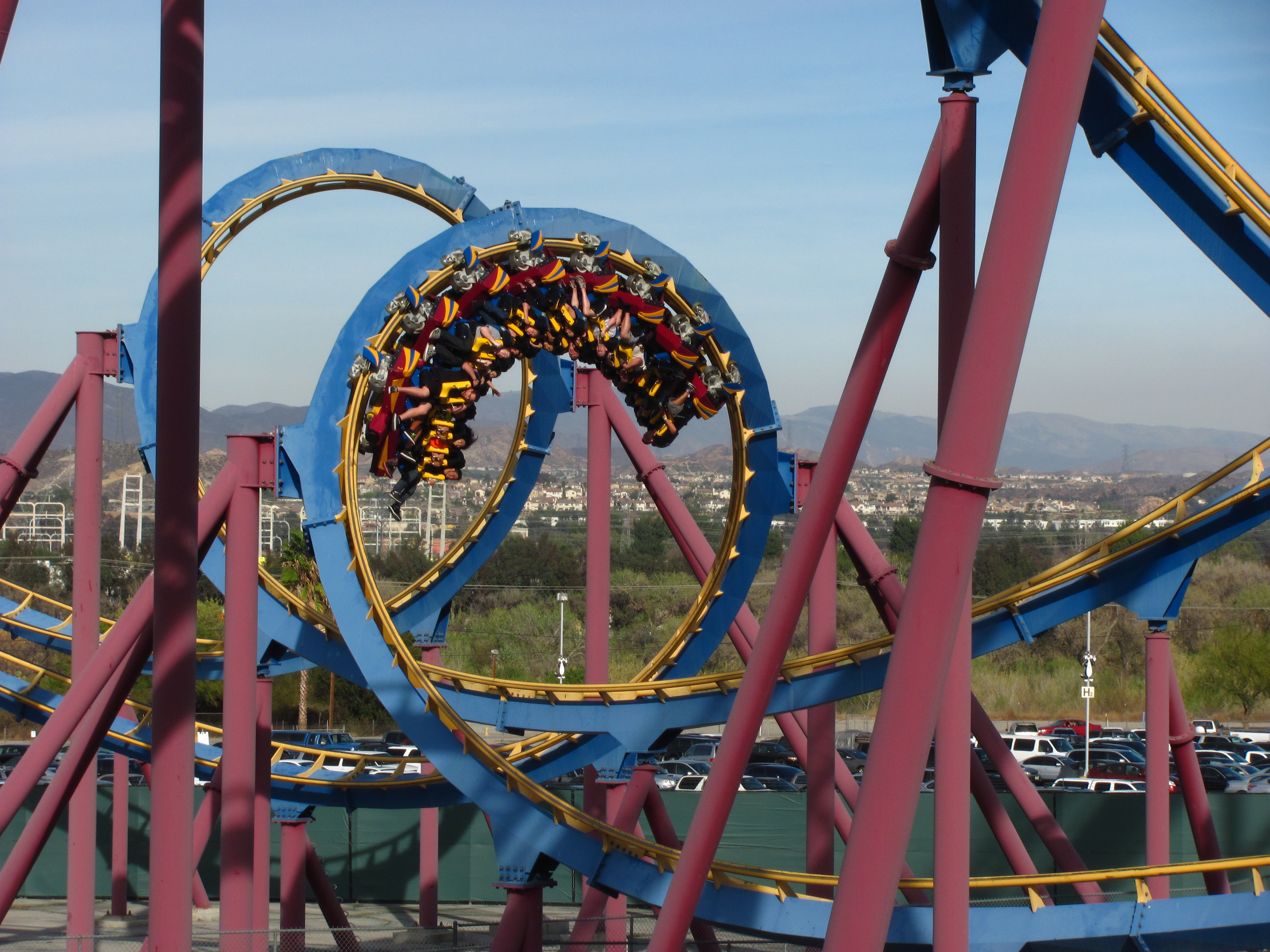
Scream's interlocking corkscrews

== Ride experience ==
Once the train is loaded and secured, the floor is retracted and the train departs the station. A U-turn to the right leads to the 150-foot-tall (46 m) chain lift hill. Once riders reach the top, they go through a small pre-drop before dropping 141 feet (43 m) to the right. The train then reaches a top speed of 63 miles per hour (101 km/h) and enters the 128-foot-tall (39 m) vertical loop followed by a turn to the left into the 96-foot-tall (29 m) dive loop. After the diving loop, the train passes the station and goes through a zero-g roll, where riders experience a feeling of weightlessness. The train then goes through the 78-foot-tall (24 m) cobra roll, a roller coaster element which inverts riders twice. Riders then enter the mid-course brake run which is located next to the lift hill. The train drops out of the brake run to the right and enters a 270-degree helix followed by the two interlocking corkscrews. Riders go through a small dip then enter the final brake run before returning to the station.

== Reception ==
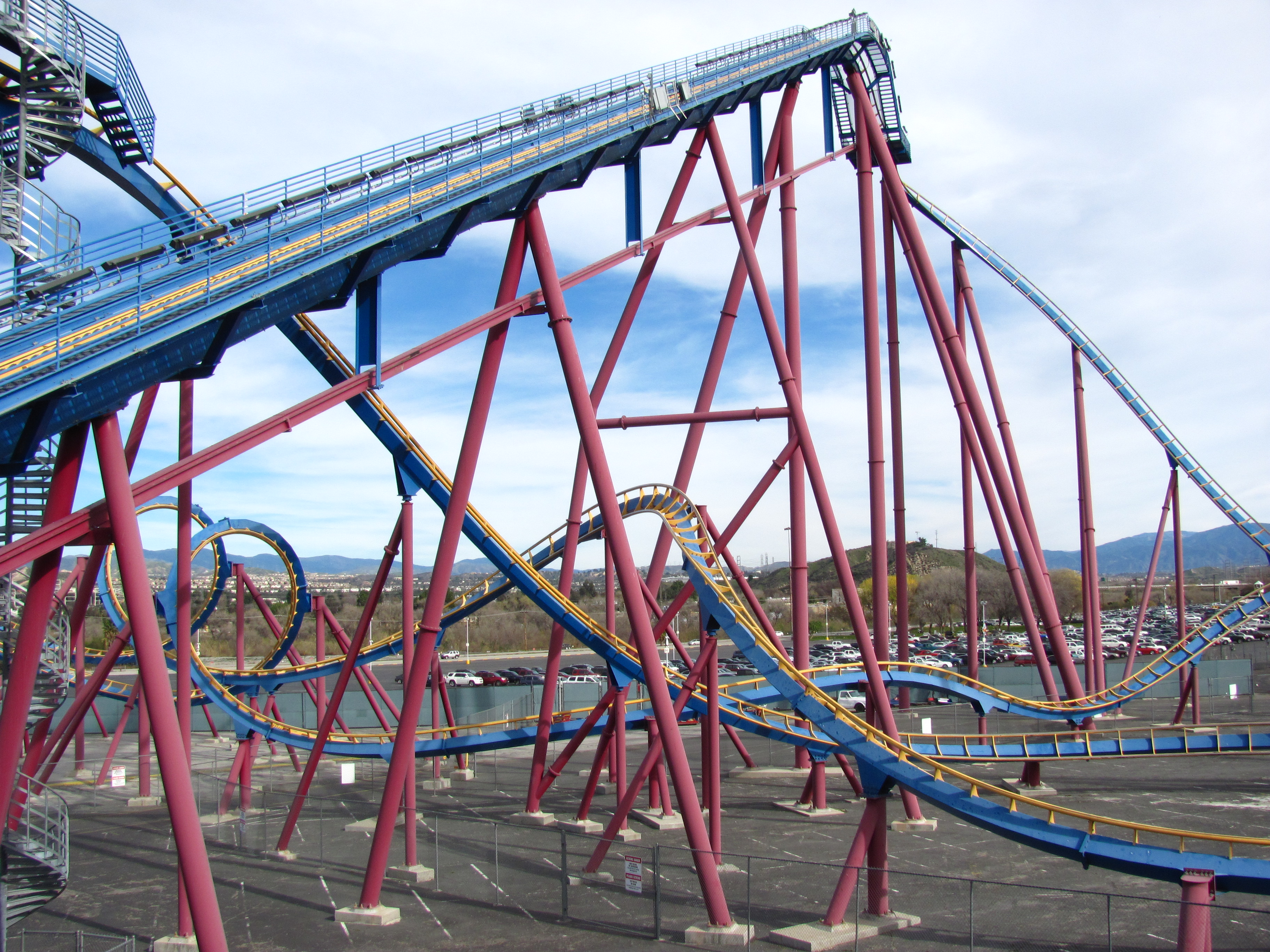
Scream's lift hill and interlocking corkscrews, with a former parking lot below

The reception of Scream has been mixed. Arthur Levine of About.com gives the ride 4 out of 5 stars. He states "it's remarkably smooth, loaded with airtime, and has plenty of surprises to warrant its name". Levine did criticize the lack of theming and landscaping around the ride noting the immediate area surrounding the ride "includes a bone yard of coaster seats and parts". Robert Niles of the Los Angeles Times shared a similar sentiment, stating "Scream creates an effective illusion that you are alone, flying above the track" but questions the ride's location on a former parking lot. He highlights "a good story can elicit extreme thoughts and emotions. [...] Why ignore those opportunities when building a thrill ride?". Niles concluded by stating "I feel a little neglected as I shuffle off the otherwise exciting ride", referring to the lack of theming or storyline. Lynn Arave of the Deseret News praised the ride, rating it alongside the Riddler's Revenge for the best rides in the park.

Scream has never featured in Amusement Today's annual Golden Ticket Awards top 50 steel roller coasters. The mirrored clone at Six Flags Great Adventure peaked at position 16 in its debut year before ranking a further six times in the list.
