= Haunted swing =

Type of amusement ride

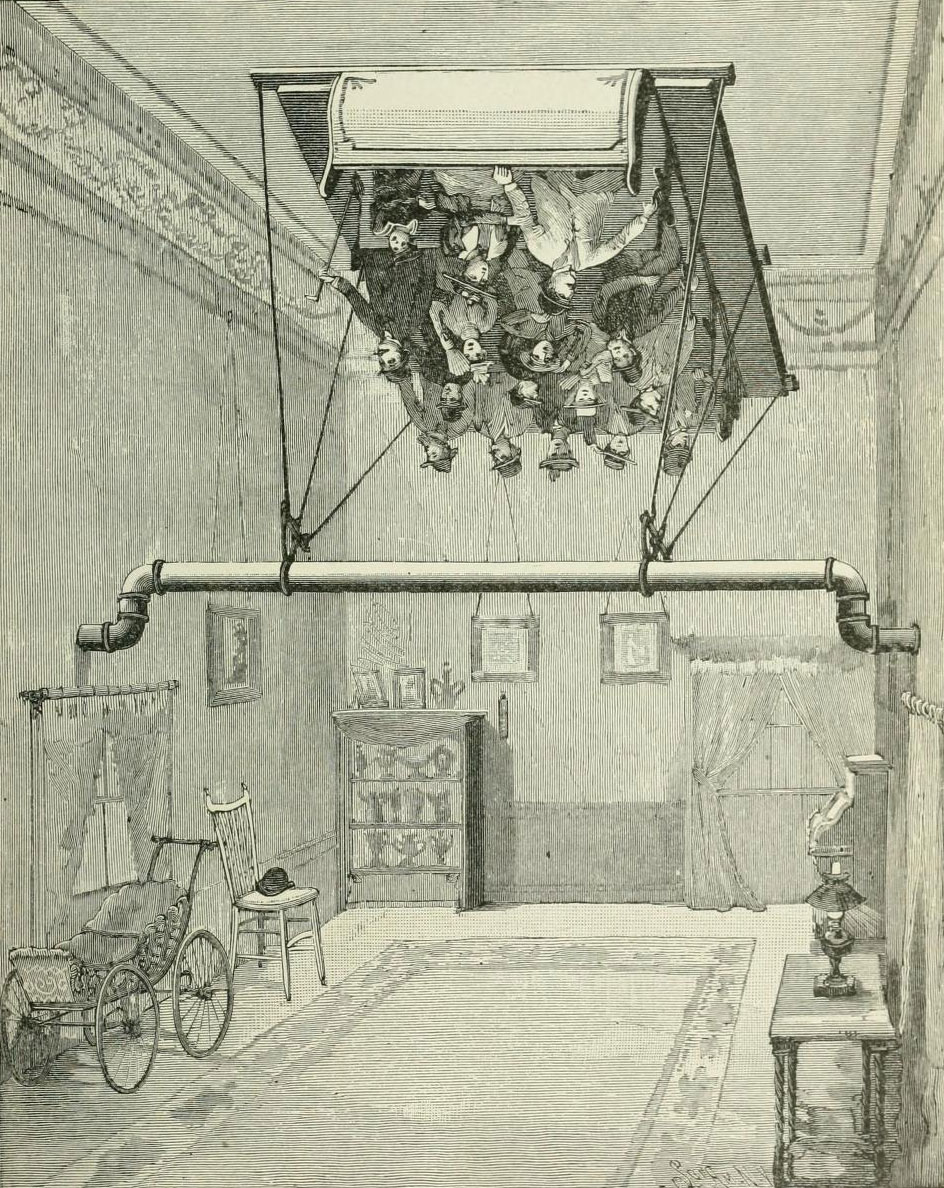
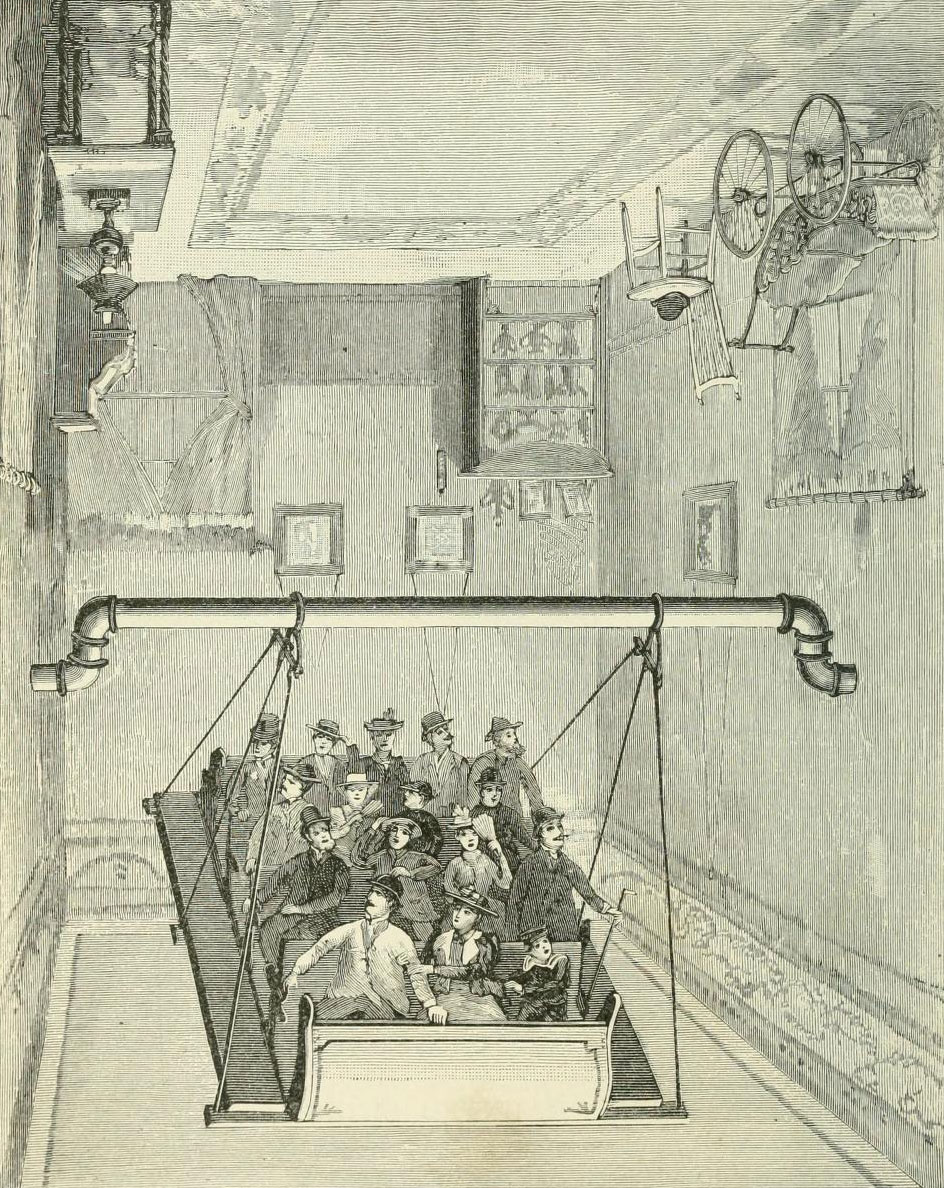
Perspective of riders (left) and the actual swing position (right)

A haunted swing, also known as diabolic swing or witches' swing, is an amusement ride giving visitors the illusion they are turning upside down by rotating the outer room independently from the platform they are seated on. While the first installations date back to the late 19th century, modern, larger-scale implementations are still being manufactured by several manufacturers, as Madhouse (by Vekoma) or Mystery Swing (by Mack Rides).

== Illusion ==
The illusion is created by separating the movement of the swing occupants sit on, and the room that surrounds them. While the swing barely moves, the room can fully rotate around the occupants. As this room is the only frame of reference visitors have, it appears as if they are turning upside down. This principle is known as vection.

== History ==
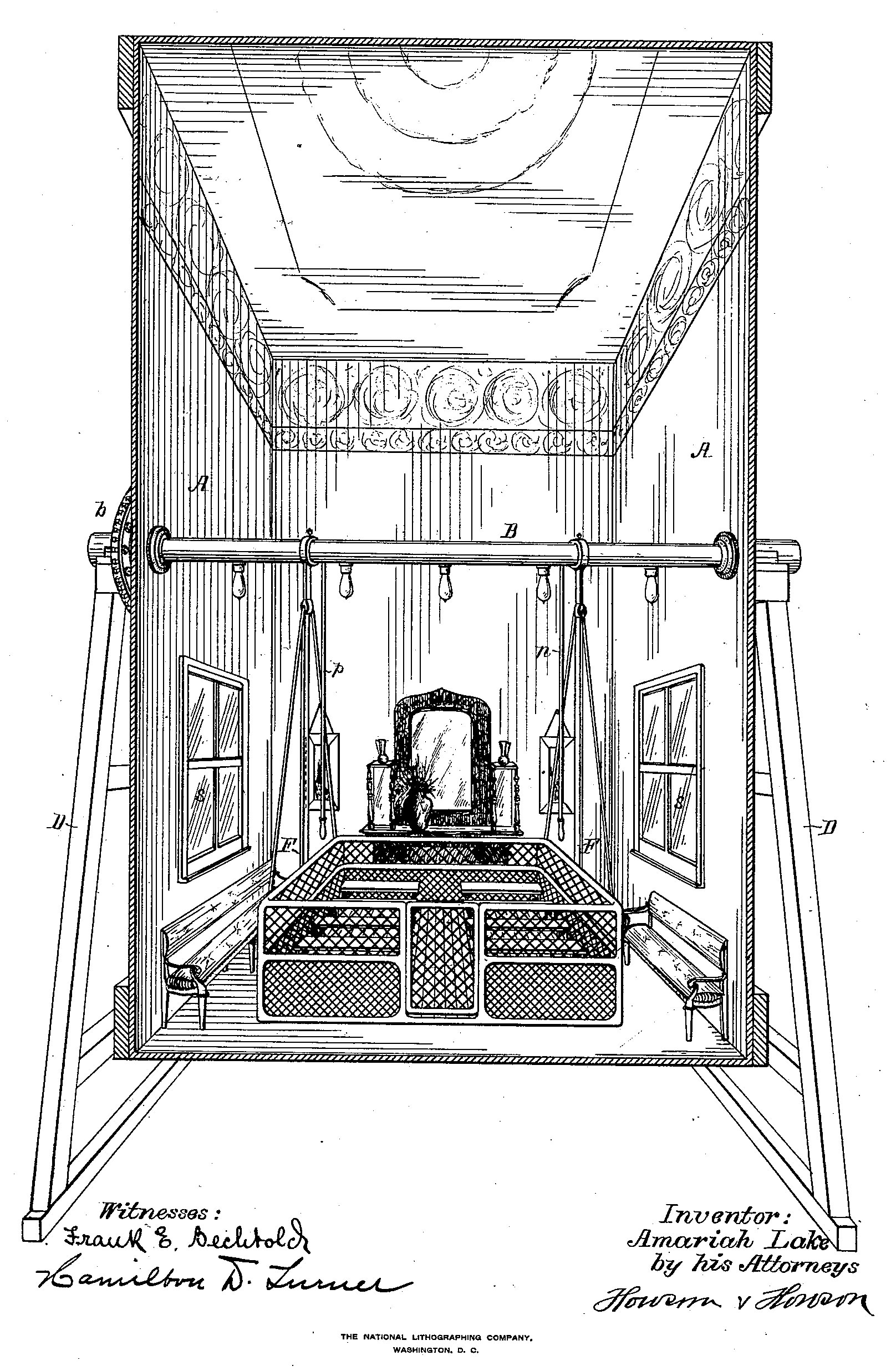
Patent drawing showing the working of the haunted swing illusion.

A patent for the ride was granted in 1893 to Amariah Lake (1836-1922), an inventor from Atlantic City, New Jersey, who was also credited with the invention of several other amusement rides. The patent describes "an apparatus (...) of such nature that the occupants (...) will be subject to the illusion that they are swinging to an extreme height, or even that the swing is turning completely over".

The first haunted swings were opened around 1894 at the Atlantic City Boardwalk and the 1894 Midwinter Fair in San Francisco. In Germany, the Hexenschaukel (Witches' Swing) opened later that year, a ride that is still operating today.

=== Ride experience ===
Several accounts of the ride experience at the first installations exist. The rooms were furnished with chairs, tables, curtains, paintings, a stroller, an iron safe and a piano, which were secured to the walls or ceiling. The illusion is further enhanced by an electric light disguised as a petroleum light, which would be unable to function when inverted. Visitors were seated on a swing that was hanging from a metal pipe. Sources disagree about the swing's capacity, ranging from 12 persons to 20 or even 40 or more.

After visitors were seated, an attendant would give the swing a small push and leave the room. The attendant would start manually rotating the room from the outside, giving riders the illusion that the swinging was increasing. Finally, the room would fully rotate several times and come to a halt.

Wood described his experience on the haunted swing at the Midwinter Fair in San Francisco. He reported several riders suffering from dizziness and nausea.

=== Madhouse ===
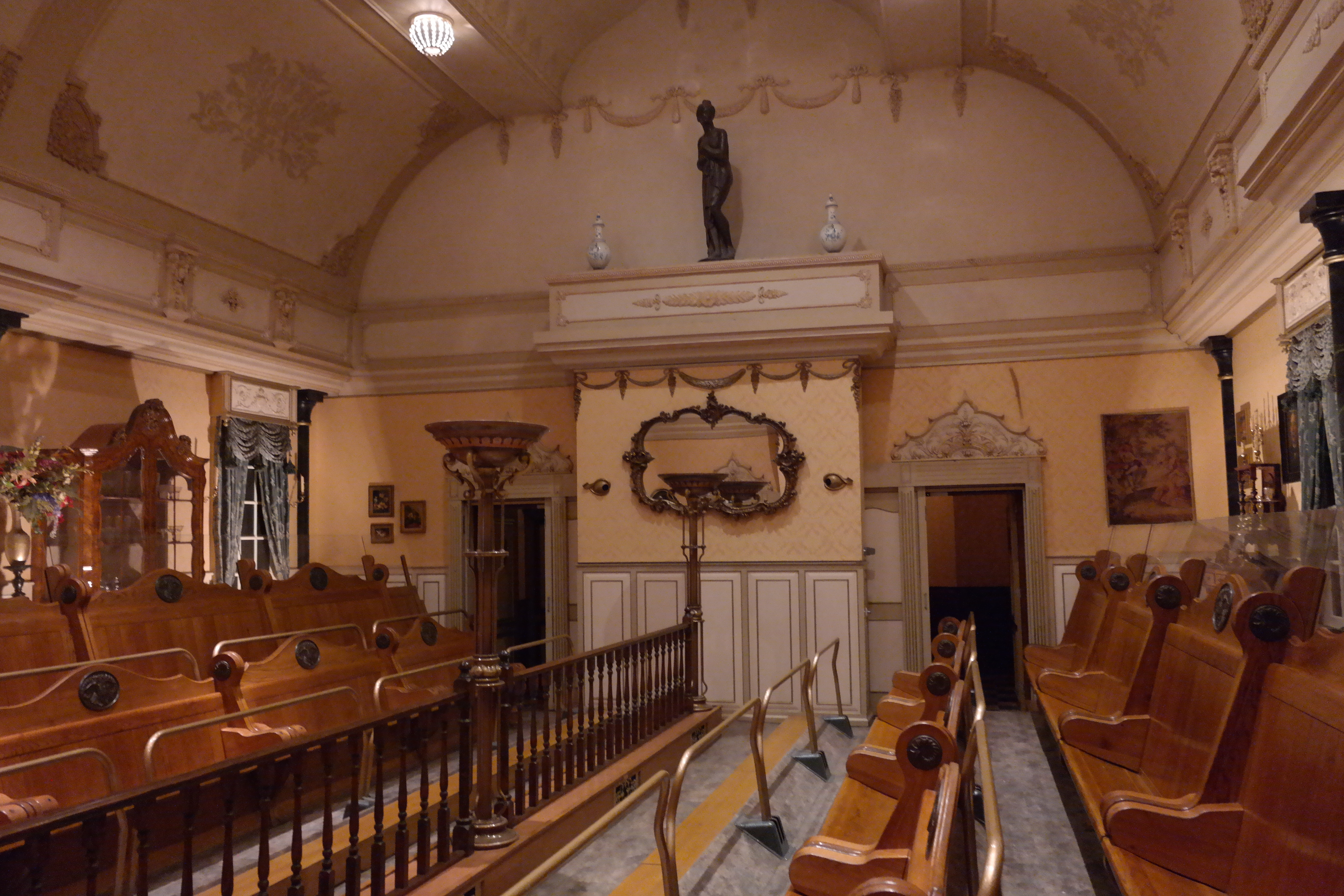
Inside of the Villa Volta ride.

In 1996, the illusion was reinvented in the amusement ride Villa Volta in Efteling theme park in the Netherlands. Built by Vekoma, this ride differed in the much larger capacity (78 persons) and the fact that the swing was also actuated, instead of passively swinging. Several rides of this type have since been built by Vekoma under the name Madhouse. Since 2000, Mack Rides produces a similar ride as Mystery Swing.
