= Medusa (Six Flags Great Adventure) =

Steel floorless roller coaster

- Previously known as Bizarro (2009–2021)

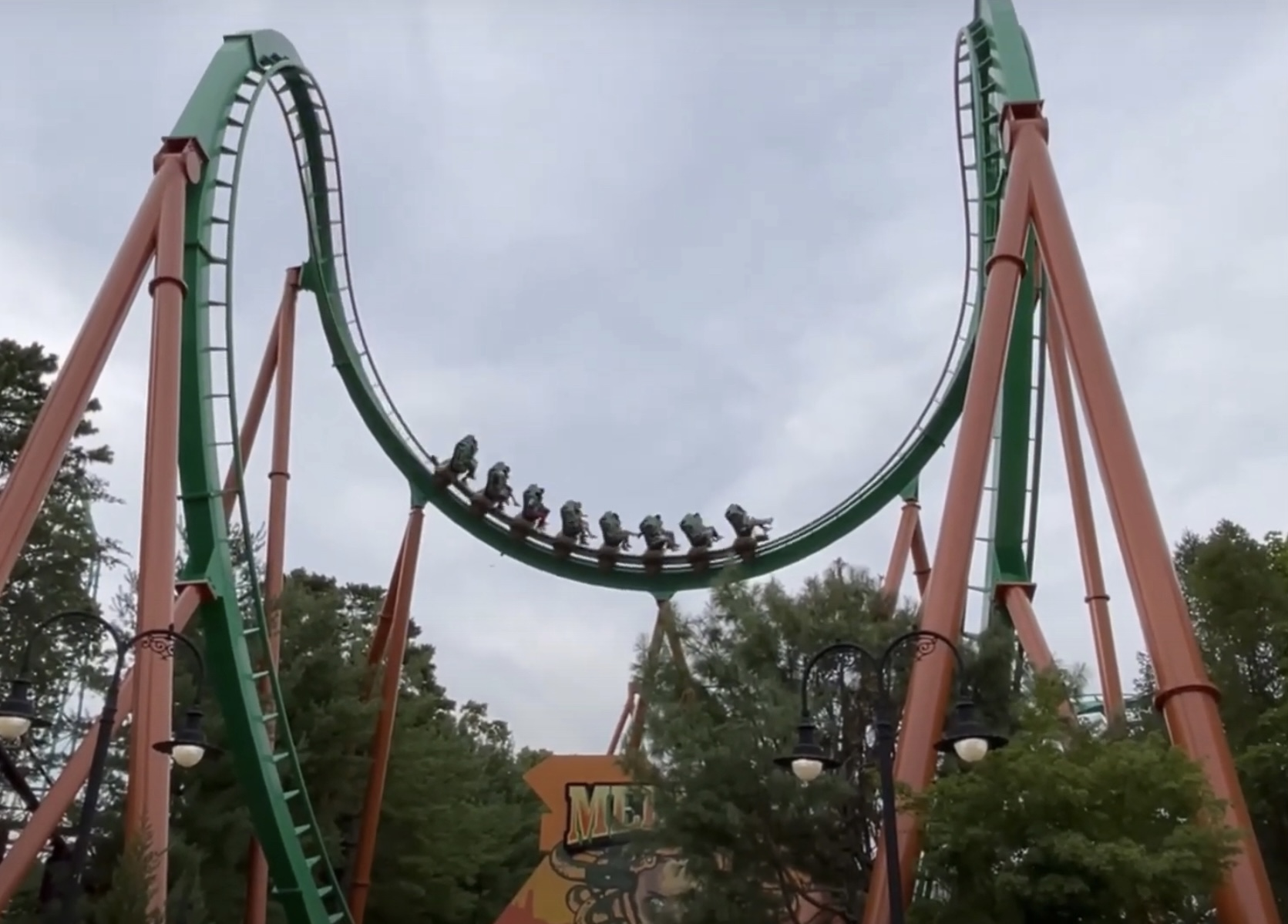
- The cobra roll element of Medusa.

Six Flags Great Adventure
- Location: Six Flags Great Adventure
- Park section: Frontier Adventures
- Coordinates: 40°8′17.62″N 74°25′56.42″W
- Status: Operating
- Opening date: April 2, 1999
- Cost: US$15,000,000

General statistics
- Type: Steel
- Manufacturer: Bolliger & Mabillard
- Designer: Werner Stengel
- Model: Floorless Coaster / Medusa
- Lift/launch system: Chain lift hill
- Height: 142 ft (43 m)
- Drop: 132 ft (40 m)
- Length: 3,985 ft (1,215 m)
- Speed: 61 mph (98 km/h)
- Inversions: 7
- Duration: 2:20
- Capacity: 1350 riders per hour
- G-force: 4
- Height restriction: 54 in (137 cm)
- Trains: 3 trains with 8 cars. Riders are arranged 4 across in a single row for a total of 32 riders per train.
- Fast Lane available
- Medusa at RCDB

Medusa, formerly known as Bizarro, is a steel roller coaster located at Six Flags Great Adventure in Jackson Township, New Jersey. Manufactured by Bolliger & Mabillard, the ride debuted as the world's first floorless roller coaster on April 2, 1999. It was repainted and rethemed to Bizarro in 2009. In 2022, it was repainted and renamed back to Medusa.

== History ==
Medusa was part of a $42 million expansion at Six Flags Great Adventure announced in January 1999, and was one of three roller coasters introduced in the expansion. The ride officially opened on April 2, 1999 as the first Floorless Coaster in the world.

On October 23, 2008, Six Flags announced that Medusa would be re-designed for the 2009 operating season. On April 1, 2009, Six Flags officially announced the details of Bizarro. Although no changes were made to the track layout, a new theme highlighting Superman's evil clone, Bizarro, was added. Bizarro opened on May 23, 2009, at the start of Memorial Day weekend. The track was repainted blue with dark purple supports and multiple special effects were added such as rings in the shape of Bizarro's S shield that the train passes through, and fire effects. The three trains also received on-board audio. Six Flags introduced an "alternate reality game" to market the re-themed ride.

On March 2, 2022, it was announced that Bizarro would be renamed back to Medusa. The rebranded Medusa reopened in July 2022. The track was painted green prior to the ride's reopening.

== Ride experience ==
=== Layout ===
Once the train is loaded and secured, the floor retracts and the front gate that blocks the train from leaving while loading opens. After leaving the station, the train makes a left turn to climb the 142-foot (43 m) tall chain lift hill. Once riders reach the top, they go through a small pre-drop before dropping 132 feet (40 m) to the left at a 55-degree angle. The train then reaches a top speed of 61 mph (98 km/h) as it enters a 114-foot (35 m) vertical loop, followed by a 96-foot (29 m) diving loop. Upon exiting the dive loop, the train passes the station and goes through a zero-g roll, followed by a cobra roll over the ride entrance. Out of the cobra roll, the train rises up into a mid-course brake run which is located next to the lift hill. Similar to the first drop, the train drops to the left and enters a 270-degree helix, before passing through two Interlocking corkscrews. After the corkscrews, the train goes through a small dip and makes a left turn into the final brake run, before making another left turn to reenter the station.

=== Trains ===
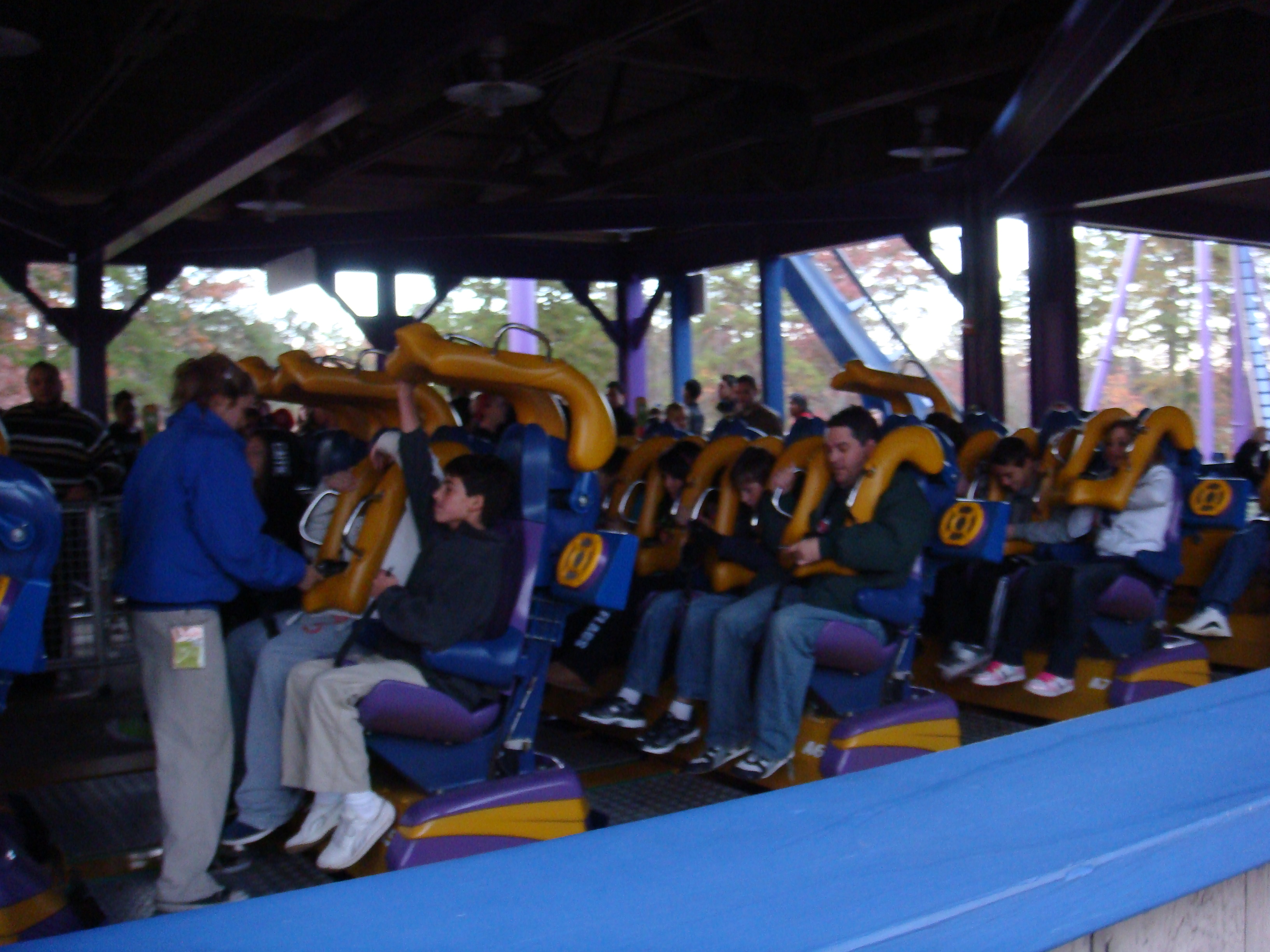
View of the station in 2009.

Medusa operates with three steel and fiberglass trains. Each train has eight cars that have four seats in a single row. In the first few years of the ride's operation as Bizarro, the middle two seats of the last row were removed on each train to install a computer and power module for the on-board audio. This reduced the capacity of the trains from 32 to 30 riders per train. Each seat on every train had a speaker to the left and right of the rider, with a recording of a montage of movie quotes being played for the duration of the ride. For the 2013 season, the on-board audio speakers and the computer module were removed; this returned the train's capacity back to 32. By late-2013, Six Flags proposed that the audio equipment would be given to Six Flags America so that the park's stand-up roller coaster Apocalypse could be fitted with an audio track for the 2014 season. However, these plans never came to fruition.

=== Track ===
The ride's track is approximately 3,985 feet (1,215 m) in length and the height of the lift is approximately 142 feet (43 m). The first drop is 132 feet (40 m). From 1999 to 2008, the ride was painted with lime green track and purple supports. Upon the retheming to Bizarro in 2009, the track was repainted blue with dark purple supports. Upon the retheming to Medusa in 2022, the ride was repainted with green track and orange supports.

== See also ==
- Scream (roller coaster), a floorless roller coaster at Six Flags Magic Mountain. It is a mirror image of Medusa.
- Medusa (Six Flags Discovery Kingdom), a floorless roller coaster at Six Flags Discovery Kingdom
