= Houdini's Great Escape =

Series of rides at Six Flags parks

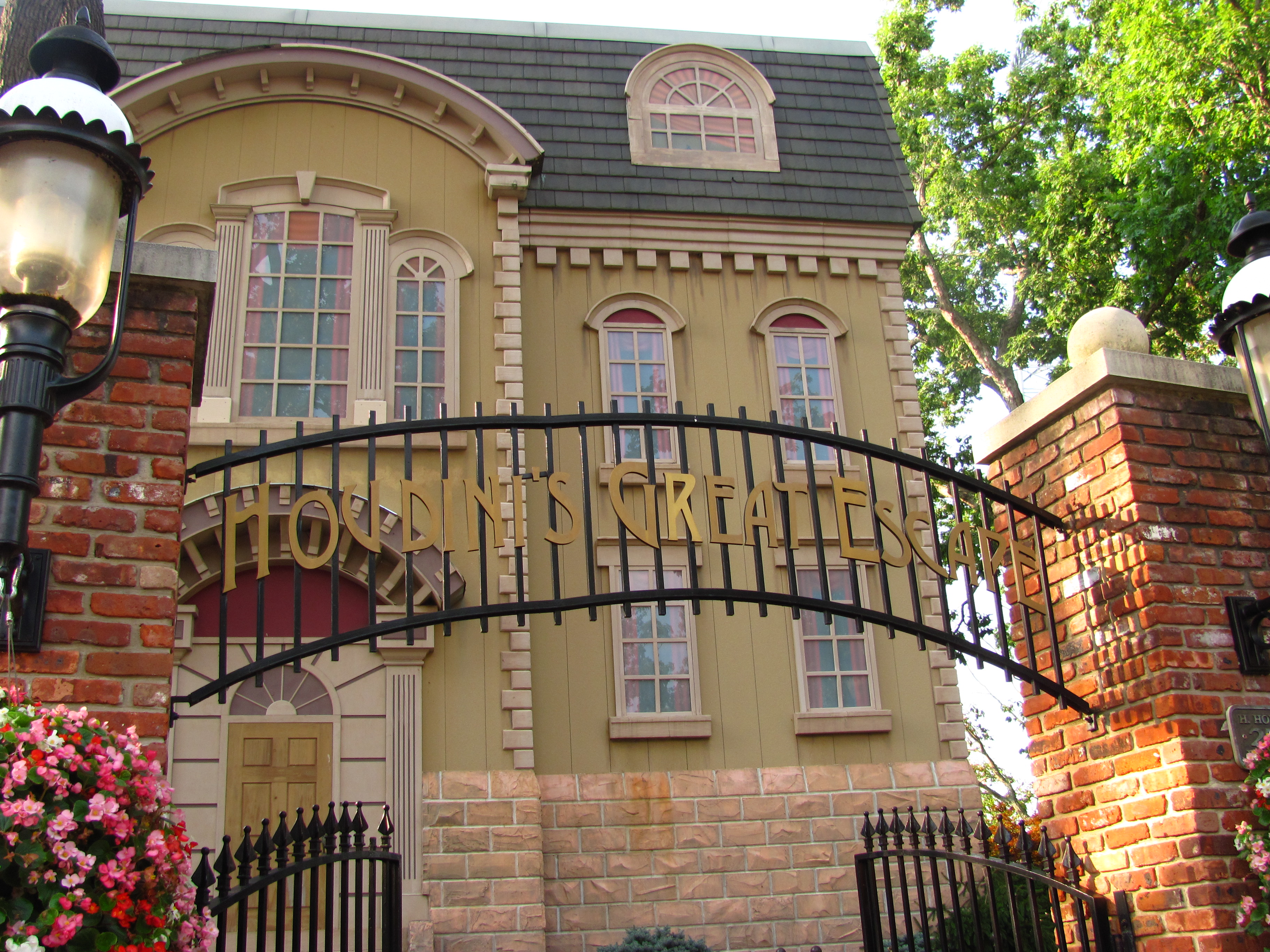

Six Flags Great Adventure
- Area: Dream Street
- Status: Operating
- Opening date: 1999
- Replaced: Shockwave

Six Flags New England
- Name: Houdini - The Great Escape
- Area: Crack Axle Canyon
- Status: Operating
- Opening date: 1999

Ride statistics
- Attraction type: Madhouse
- Manufacturer: Vekoma
- Theme: Harry Houdini

Houdini's Great Escape, also known as Boo-dini during Fright Fest and Houdini - The Great Escape at Six Flags New England, is a dark indoor Vekoma Madhouse attraction located at Six Flags Great Adventure and Six Flags New England. This ride is located in Great Adventure's Dream Street section and New England's Crack Axle Canyon section. The attraction opened at both parks in 1999, and was standing but not operating at Great Adventure from 2008 to 2009. but was opened again due to popular demand.

== History ==
=== Six Flags Great Adventure ===
The area where the Garden of Marvels and Shockwave roller coaster were located was cleared as part of Great Adventure's "War on Lines" in the 1999 season. It became home to the now-defunct Dare Devil Dive and still running Houdini's Great Escape. The ride was opened slightly after the start of the 1999 season as a very successful ride. The ride was closed after the 2007 season, not be opened again until Fright Fest 2009. The Houdini's Great Escape entrance sign was removed, but the indoor and outdoor parts of the ride remained. No information was given about the fate of the ride until it was re-opened for Fright Fest at the end of the 2009 season. Excited park guests were disappointed to find out that the ride was planned to be closed the entire 2010 summer season until Fright Fest. A Facebook group was made to support the reopening of the ride for the whole season. Six Flags management said during a "Super Fan Call" that Houdini's Great Escape was slated to be open Memorial Day through Labor Day during the 2010 season. The ride opened early on May 22, 2010 and although the ride was planned to be closed on Labor Day, the park decided to keep the ride open past the planned closure date.

=== Six Flags New England ===
Like Great Adventure's Houdini, the ride opened in 1999. During Fright Fest the ride is named Midnight Mansion. Instead of the ride being held in a Victorian style home, the ride takes place in an opera house. This version of the ride has different voice actors, dialogue, and a more dramatic vibe.

==== Incident ====
On October 9, 2010, Houdini's Great Escape (renamed temporarily to Midnight Mansion), which was available during Fright Fest, had caught on fire. Firefighters were called to extinguish the flames, but the ride was closed for the rest of the night and the following day. Investigations show that a flammable cobweb hanging on the top of the building was the cause of the fire after coming in close contact with a light fixture. Nearly 20 feet of cobweb burned up, and the building only suffered minor damages to the roof and exterior. No one was injured but damages were estimated at $5,000.

== Ride ==
=== Queue ===
The line weaves through Houdini's garden, which features several trees, shrubs, and an ornate fountain. The queue line at Great Adventure is next to the park's Carousel. The line stops in front of Houdini's house, which features posters advertising Houdini's magic tricks, as well as daily seances which are held in the house.

=== Preshow ===
After entering the house, guests come into Houdini's library, complete with faux candles and books. Margery, an unseen narrator, tells guests about Houdini and about their goal - to bring back the spirit of Houdini to the world of the living. She shows a film of Houdini so guests can concentrate on his image. Soon after the film ends, all the candles in the room blow out and Houdini's spirit begins to enter various objects in the room, including chains, gargoyles, and the Chinese Water Torture chamber. After making the candelabra in the front of the room move, Houdini's face appears on the mirror in the front of the room (In the New England version, Houdini speaks and claims that nothing on the earth can hold him back from coming back from the dead).The candles light themselves again and Margery congratulates guests on bringing back Houdini's spirit, and invites riders move on to Houdini's parlor, where the main ride takes place.

=== Ride ===
After sitting down in one of two sets of benches which face each other, the exit doors close and the lights dim. A crystal ball illuminates, showing Houdini's head inside the ball, (not in the New England version.) He denounces Margery and other frauds who claim to bring Houdini back to the world of the living, since he claims he never left. In order to show you his power, he locks you in place with a set of magical keys (projected onto mirrors) and tells you he will show you his greatest illusion to date. The room begins to rotate, and the benches swing. At the climax of the ride, the room and benches stop so that riders should theoretically be upside down. Once the ride ends, Houdini unlocks riders from their position and allows them to leave the ride, forever believing in the power of Harry Houdini.

== Technical information ==
Houdini's Great Escape is a Mad House attraction, manufactured by Vekoma. The ride's benches, in reality, do not even rotate beyond 50 degrees, but they do rotate while the room spins to give the illusion of flipping. The theming of the attraction was done by Showquest Studios. A near clone of the ride exists at Six Flags New England, called Houdini: The Great Escape, but it is inside of an opera house instead of a Victorian-style house. In the New England version, Houdini speaks after he appears on the mirror. The two rides have different voice actors, and there is more dialogue in the Great Adventure version.

== Temporary closure ==
At the beginning of the 2008 season, the decision was made not to re-open Houdini, along with several other closed rides, and several flat rides were removed. That was not the plan from the beginning, but the ride was closed for reasons unknown. The ride stood, fully intact except for its signs, for the whole of the 2008 season. In 2009, Houdini's Great Escape was rumored to be opened again for Fright Fest, and sure enough, it opened on September 25 and remained open for all of Fright Fest. However, a furor among Six Flags Great Adventure fans started up when Houdini's Great Escape was taken off the park's website. A group on Facebook was started with a goal to reopen the ride, and after reaching over 600 fans Great Adventure announced during a Super Fan Call that Houdini's Great Escape would operate from Memorial Day to Labor Day during the 2010 season. The ride has remained open throughout the whole season since 2011.
