= Nitro (Imagicaa) =

Floorless coaster at Imagicaa in India

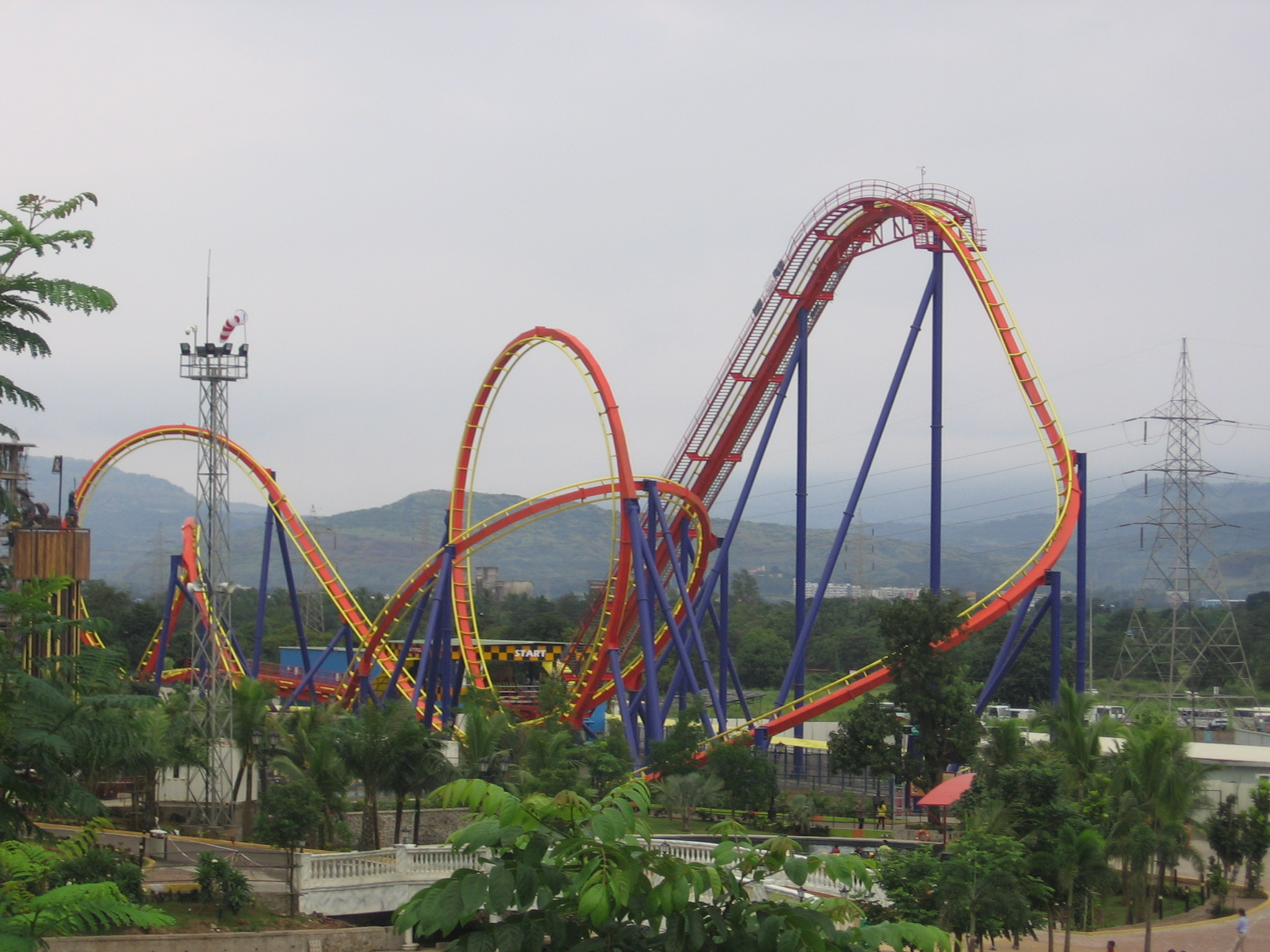
- Nitro in October 2013

Imagicaa
- Location: Imagicaa
- Park section: Americana
- Coordinates: 18.766376°N 73.279961°E
- Status: Operating
- Opening date: October 2013

General statistics
- Type: Steel – Floorless Coaster
- Manufacturer: Bolliger & Mabillard
- Model: Floorless Coaster
- Track layout: Twister
- Lift/launch system: Chain lift hill
- Height: 132 ft (40 m)
- Length: 2,800 ft (850 m)
- Speed: 65.2 mph (104.9 km/h)
- Inversions: 5
- Duration: 2:30
- Height restriction: 52 in (132 cm)
- Trains: 2 trains with 6 cars. Riders are arranged 4 across in a single row for a total of 24 riders per train.
- Nitro at RCDB

Nitro (Marathi: नाइट्रो, romanized: Naitro) is a steel Floorless Coaster at Imagicaa amusement park in Khopoli, Maharashtra, India. Manufactured by Bolliger & Mabillard, the roller coaster reaches a maximum height of 132 feet (40 m) and a maximum speed of 65.2 miles per hour (104.9 km/h). The coaster also features five inversions. Nitro opened to the public in October 2013.

== History ==
As construction progressed with the theme park in early 2013, the owners of the park gave no details about the roller coaster other than that it would be the largest roller coaster in India. Even after the Roller Coaster Database reported that a Bolliger & Mabillard Floorless Coaster would be built at the park, the owners still released no details. In April 2013, the first pieces of the roller coaster were erected. By the end of August, all of the coaster's track was installed. Then in the third quarter of 2013, Adlabs Imagica released the details of Nitro.

Nitro was originally scheduled to open in May 2013; however, it did not open until October.

In 2018, Imagicaa announced that Nitro would be renamed to Hot Wheels Nitro, after a partnership with Mattel.

== Ride experience ==
Once the train is loaded and secured, the steel floor is retracted and the gate in front of the train opens. After being dispatched, the train immediately begins to climb the 132-foot (40 m) chain lift hill. At the top, the train drops down a small straight section before finishing the drop with a sharp turn to the right. When the train reaches the bottom of the drop, it reaches its maximum speed of 65.2 miles per hour (104.9 km/h) and enters a vertical loop, followed by a dive loop. After making a slight turn to the right, the train makes a banked right turn through the loop it passes through before. Then, the train passes through a trim brake (to slow the train down) before entering a zero-gravity roll. The train then makes a banked turn to the left leading into the first of the interlocking corkscrews. After a banked turn to the right and a slight turn to the left, the train goes through the second corkscrew. The train then enters an approximate 180-degree downward banked turn to the left before making a final right turn into the brake run which leads directly back to the station. When the train arrives back to the station, the floors come back up, with the front gate closes, and the next riders board. One cycle of the ride lasts about 2 minutes and 30 seconds.

== Characteristics ==
=== Track ===
Designed by Bolliger & Mabillard, the steel track of Nitro is approximately 2,800 feet (850 m) long, and the height of the lift is 132-foot (40 m) high. The roller coaster also features five inversions. The track is painted red with yellow rails and blue supports.

=== Trains ===
Nitro operates with two steel and fiberglass trains. Each train has six cars that can seat four rides in a single row, for a total of 24 riders per train; each seat has its own individual over the shoulder restraint. The structure of the trains are coloured blue, red, and yellow; the seats are black and the restraints are yellow. Also, unlike traditional steel roller coasters, Nitro does not have a floor on its trains.

With the trains reaching a top speed of 65.2 miles per hour (104.9 km/h), Nitro is the second fastest Bolliger & Mabillard Floorless Coaster.

== Reception ==
Neha Borkar from the Indiatimes said, "[The roller coaster] almost kills you, because it twirls, twists, and turns at a rapid speed, which reminds you of speed from the movies like 'Final Destination' and 'The Fast and the Furious'.
