= Hotel Embrujado =

Ride at Parque Warner Madrid, Spain

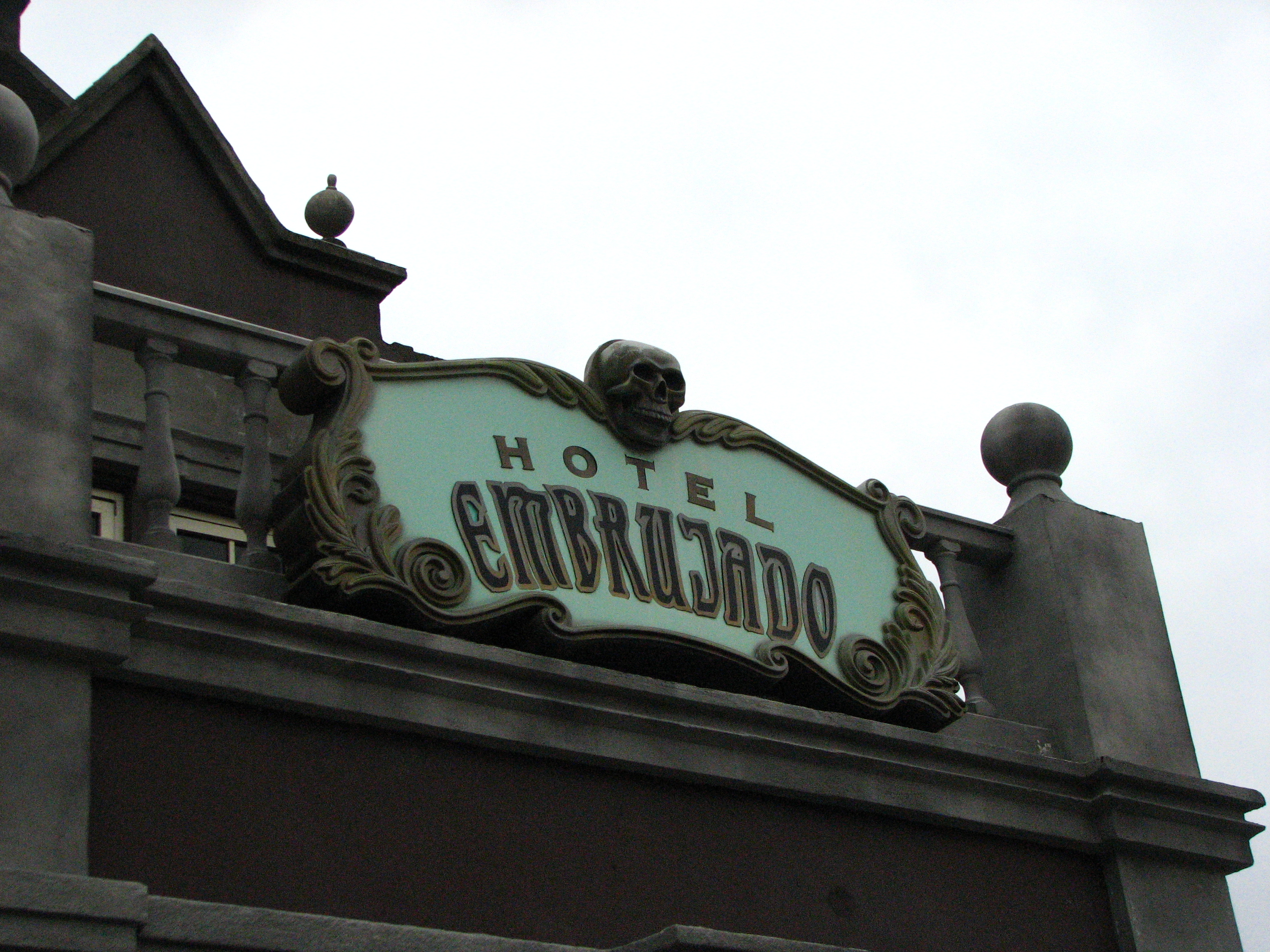

Parque Warner Madrid
- Area: Movie World Studios
- Coordinates: 40.229973°N 3.591655°W
- Status: Operating
- Opening date: 6 April 2002; 24 years ago

Ride statistics
- Attraction type: Madhouse dark ride
- Manufacturer: Vekoma
- Designer: Warner Bros. Six Flags
- Theme: Chateau Marmont
- Height restriction: 47 in (119 cm)
- Must transfer from wheelchair

Hotel Embrujado, also known as The Haunted Hotel, is a disorienting madhouse dark ride in Madrid, Spain. It is part of Parque Warner Madrid. The attraction is inspired by the Chateau Marmont and takes place at the fictional Hotel Embrujado in Hollywood, California. The attraction takes riders into a seemingly ordinary banquet hall, and presents the riders with a fictional backstory of a bride left at the altar many years before, who then went towards the supernatural.

== Preshow ==
Guests enter the abandoned hotel ride building through the derelict lobby. The lobby is covered in dust and draped with cobwebs. Walking past old paintings and statues, guests are ushered into the library, which houses the hotel's collection of books, and antiques. When they arrive the lights dim and two busts on either side of a massive mirror, above a fire, come to life and start discussing the disappearance of Eduardo the groom who vanished on his wedding night from the hotel.

"That night, Eduardo took refuge once again here ... among all these books. No wonder, a hotel library is a lonely place, that's why he liked to come here."

"Something has changed in this place, I see the fire but I feel cold, I feel as if Isabel's soul possesses me and is melted with her shadows ... "

As the statues tell the story of Eduardo and his fiancé Isabel, the mirror begins to reflect the past and show the guests what happened. While Eduardo is going on about his reservations about marrying Isabel, guests see the fire from the mirror leap forwards and absorb Eduardo.

The guests are then led into the banquet hall where Eduardo and Isabel were meant to wed. Decaying food, and rats liter the table. At the end, the corpse of Isabel still sits in her wedding dress waiting for Eduardo.

"It's a very special banquet that has not yet started. On a day that will never end. That's why I'm still here, waiting for my beloved. Waiting for Eduardo, for years... decades. With all of my love rotting in my heart."

The corpse of Isabel pulls herself off the table, and recounts her time waiting for Eduardo. While she does, the room starts spinning, guests are turned upside-down. In the end the ghost of Eduardo shows up, but quickly vanishes again. Angry Isabel curses everyone and banishes them from her wedding.

== Technical details ==
The ride system for the Hotel Embrujado employs the haunter swing illusion, which uses optical and physical illusions to give riders a sense that they are repeatedly being turned upside down.

== Incidents ==
On 13 August 2005, 23-year old Francisco Javier Infante, a Spanish man was hit in the head by a ride vehicle after allegedly forcing his way off the attraction. Park emergency personnel applied first aid procedures; the man was in critical condition. He was helicoptered to the hospital, where he later died due to his injuries. Infante's family went on to sue the park claiming they were negligent and that the lap bar was loose allowing him to slip out of the ride. When the case went to trial, to was ruled that the death was the park's fault, and charged the maintenance manager a fine of €12,000, along with the supervisor of the security cameras a fine of €3,600. When the case was attempted to be appealed, it was denied. For the sister of the deceased who was with him on the ride, "it has been a great satisfaction" for the family "because it has been proved that the park was responsible" and the accident was not the fault of his brother, "as they claimed."
