= Madhouse (ride) =

Amusement park flat ride

- Status: In production
- First manufactured: 1996
- No. of installations: 16
- Manufacturer: Vekoma
- Capacity: 685/1335 riders per hour
- Seat capacity: 40/78
- Gondola rotation: 15/30 degrees
- Drum rotation: 360 degrees

Mystery Swing
- Status: Not For Sale
- First manufactured: 2000
- No. of installations: 4
- Manufacturer: Mack Rides
- Seat capacity: 52/80

A Madhouse is a flat ride usually manufactured by Vekoma. A similar attraction under the name Mystery Swing is created by Mack Rides. The ride is designed to be an optical and physical illusion, consisting of several rows of seats attached to a swaying gondola within a rotating drum. The ride creates the impression that the rider is turning upside down, whereas it is actually the room that is moving around them.

The ride is a modern implementation of a haunted swing illusion.

== Ride experience ==
Madhouses are often extensively themed during the ride sequence, and usually in the queue line. Several madhouses feature pre-shows explaining a story behind the ride. Once in the ride, lapbars are lowered onto the riders, before they gradually experience an odd sense of movement. This is achieved through two mechanisms: the separate floor can move in a controlled swing from side-to-side by up to 7.5/15 degrees in each direction, but the surroundings of the room can rotate through a full 360 degrees. The pivot mechanism for the floor is hidden by two large objects at the end of the room, which are themed to match the ride.

At this point, both the floor and the room are slowly moving in unison. As the ride continues, the floor starts a separate movement from the rotating drum which gradually gives the impression that the room is rotating backwards and forwards further each time. Vekoma offers theme parks the option of programming their own sequence of how the room and floor move. In many madhouses, the lighting subtly changes from moment to moment to add to the disorientation. Eventually, the drum mechanism turns through a full rotation and, by careful synchronisation with the sensation of the swinging floor mechanism, the riders are fooled into feeling as if they themselves are being repeatedly turned upside down.

== List of Madhouses ==
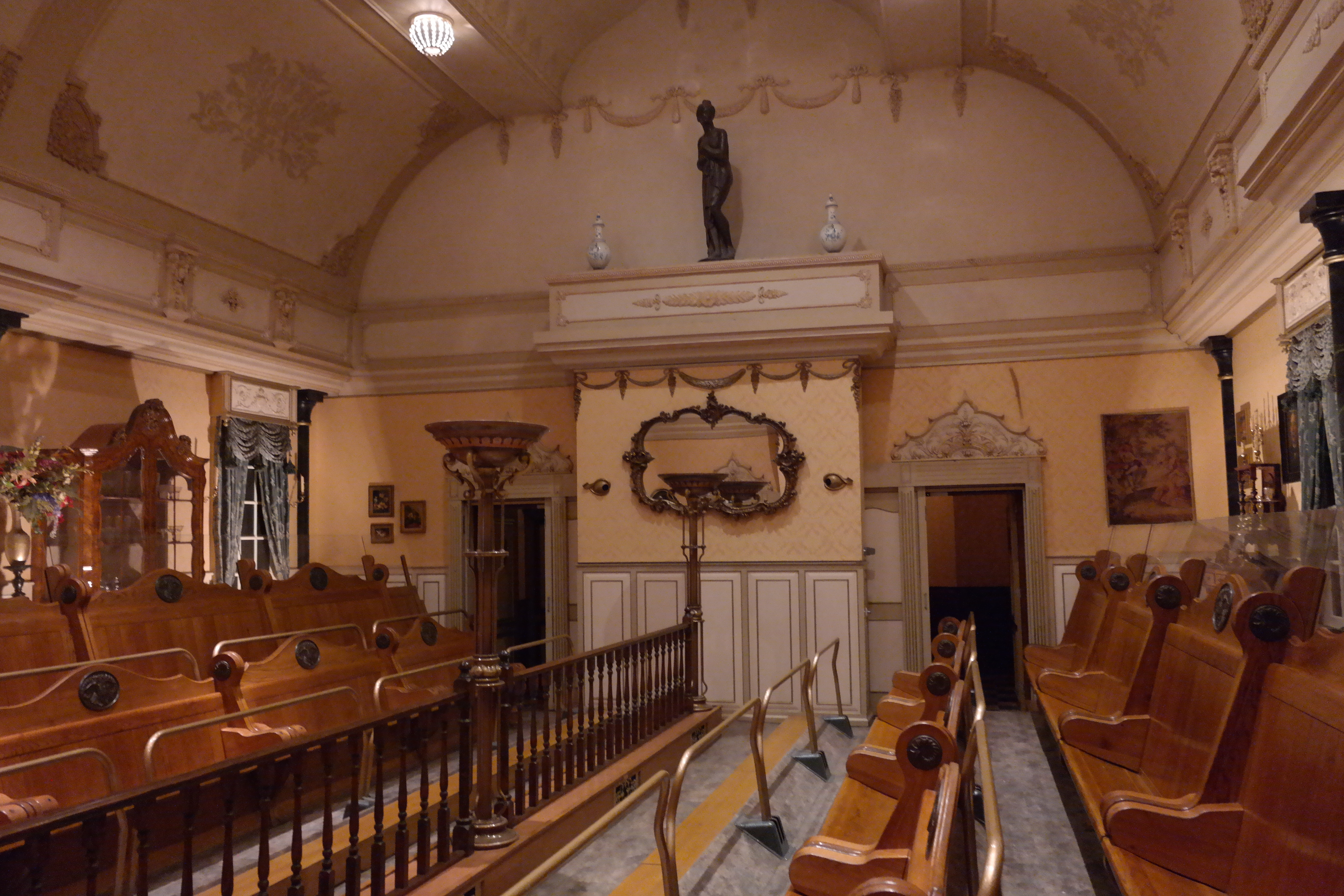
Interior of Villa Volta, the first modern madhouse.

Name	Park	Country	Opened	Manufacturer
Haunted Swing	Anywhere	Anywhere	1893-1922	?
Hexenschaukel (Witch's Swing)	Mobile Mad House	Germany	1894	U. Keller
Hex’n Wippn (Witches' See-Saw)	(Mobile Mad House)	Germany	1968	Lielie
Spukhaus (Haunted House)	Taunus Wunderland	Germany	1973	Schwingel GmbH
Herzogschaukel (Duke Swing)	Märchengarten Blühendes Barock Ludwigsburg	Germany	1972	?
Verhextes Schloss (Chained Lock)	Freizeitpark Traumland	Germany	?	Dietz Fahrzeugbau GmbH
Draaiend Huis	Bobbejaanland	Belgium	1982-1998	Schwingel GmBH
Merlin's Mystical Mansion	Clark's Trading Post, Lincoln New Hampshire	United States	1990	In house
Villa Volta	Efteling	Netherlands	1996	Vekoma
The Haunting	Drayton Manor	Great Britain	1996	Vekoma
Jack the Ripper	Wiener Prater	Austria	1997	?
Crazy Space Lab	Genting Theme Park	Malaysia	1998–2013	Vekoma
Valhalla Borgen (Valhalla Castle)	Tivoli Gardens	Denmark	1998–2007	Vekoma
Houdini's Great Escape (Houdini – The Great Escape)	Six Flags New England	United States	1999	Vekoma
Houdini's Great Escape	Six Flags Great Adventure	United States	1999–2009, 2011	Vekoma
Houdini (Formally: Magic house of Houdini)	Bellewaerde	Belgium	1999	Vekoma
Fluch der Kassandra (Curse of Cassandra/Cassandra's Curse)	Europa-Park	Germany	2000	Mack Rides
Hex – The Legend of the Towers	Alton Towers	Great Britain	2000	Vekoma
Merlin’s Magic Castle	Walibi Holland	Netherlands	2000	Vekoma
Le Palais du génie (The Palace of genie)	Walibi Belgium	Belgium	2001	Vekoma
Impossible	Blackpool Pleasure Beach	Great Britain	1955-2001 (as The Haunted Swing) 2002	In house
Feng Ju Palace	Phantasialand	Germany	2002	Vekoma
Hotel Embrujado (Haunted Hotel)	Parque Warner Madrid	Spain	2002	Vekoma
Magic House (Formally: Mad House)	Gardaland	Italy	2002	Vekoma
Noah’s Incredible Adventure/Curse of the Crypt	Noah’s Ark Water Park	United States	2003–2008, 2009-2012	Mack Rides
Verlies des Grauens (Dungeon of Horrors)	Belantis	Germany	2003	Vekoma
Lenny's Magic School (No rotating part)	Everland	South Korea	2007-2019 (as Rotating House) 2019	Mack Rides
Le Défi de César (Caesar's Challenge/The Challenge of Cesar)	Parc Astérix	France	2008	Mack Rides
Alpenhotel Rasch (parts of)	(Mobile Mad House)	Germany	2011	Dietz Fahrzeugbau GmbH
Maison Houdini (House Houdini)	Rainbow MagicLand	Italy	2011	Vekoma
Haunted House Monster Party	Legoland Windsor	Great Britain	2019	Vekoma
Dizzy Lizzy's Four Quarters Saloon	Idlewild and Soak Zone	United States	1999-2012	In-house

== Cancelled installations ==
Name or Area name's Madhouse	Park	Country	Reason	Manufacturer
Z-Force	Six Flags Dubai	United Arab Emirates	Cancelled	Vekoma
Poseidon Fury	Island of Adventure	United States	Project Change	?
El Templo de Muerte (The Temple of Dead)	Bobbejaanland	Belgium	Unknown	Vekoma
Manhattan Midway's Madhouse	Tokyo Disney Sea	Japan	Over Budget	Vekoma
