= Floorless Coaster =

Type of roller coaster

Floorless Roller Coaster
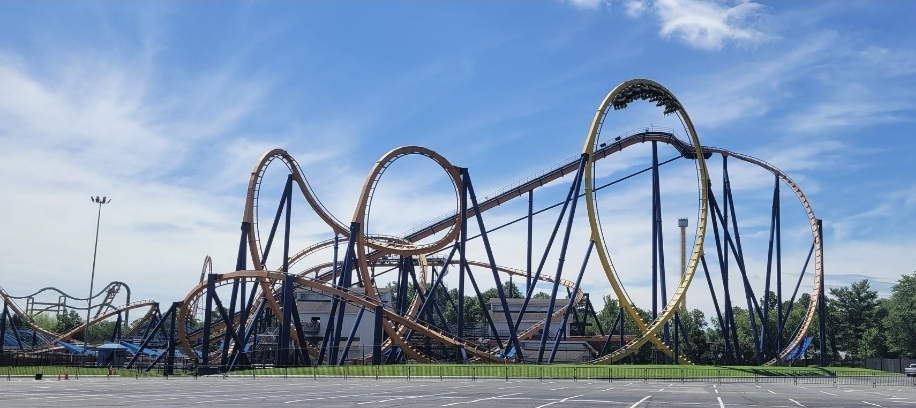
- Dominator at Kings Dominion
- Status: In production
- First manufactured: 1999
- No. of installations: 14
- Manufacturers: Bolliger & Mabillard; Mack Rides
- Vehicle type: Floorless seats located above the track
- Vehicles: 6-8-car Floorless Coaster trains
- Riders per row: 4; 2 (Mack Rides)
- Restraint Style: Over-the-shoulder harness; Over the shoulder lap bar (Mack Rides)
- Floorless Roller Coaster at RCDB

A Floorless Coaster is a type of steel roller coaster manufactured by Bolliger & Mabillard and Mack Rides, where riders sit with no floor underneath them, allowing their feet to swing freely just above the track. Development of the Floorless Coaster model began between 1995 and 1996 with Medusa at Six Flags Great Adventure, which opened on April 2, 1999, as the world's first Floorless Coaster. Floorless Coasters typically feature between three and seven inversions in the layout of the coaster.

Since 2007, Bolliger & Mabillard have used floorless trains on their Dive Coasters, such as Griffon and SheiKra. Though they contain floorless trains, the coasters are still not considered Floorless Coasters, as the company classifies them as another model. Maurer Söhne has designed their own version of the Floorless Coaster, a variant of their X-Car model called X-Car Floorless, but currently do not have any installations. Mack Rides designed their version of a floorless coaster, which is set to debut in 2027.

== History ==
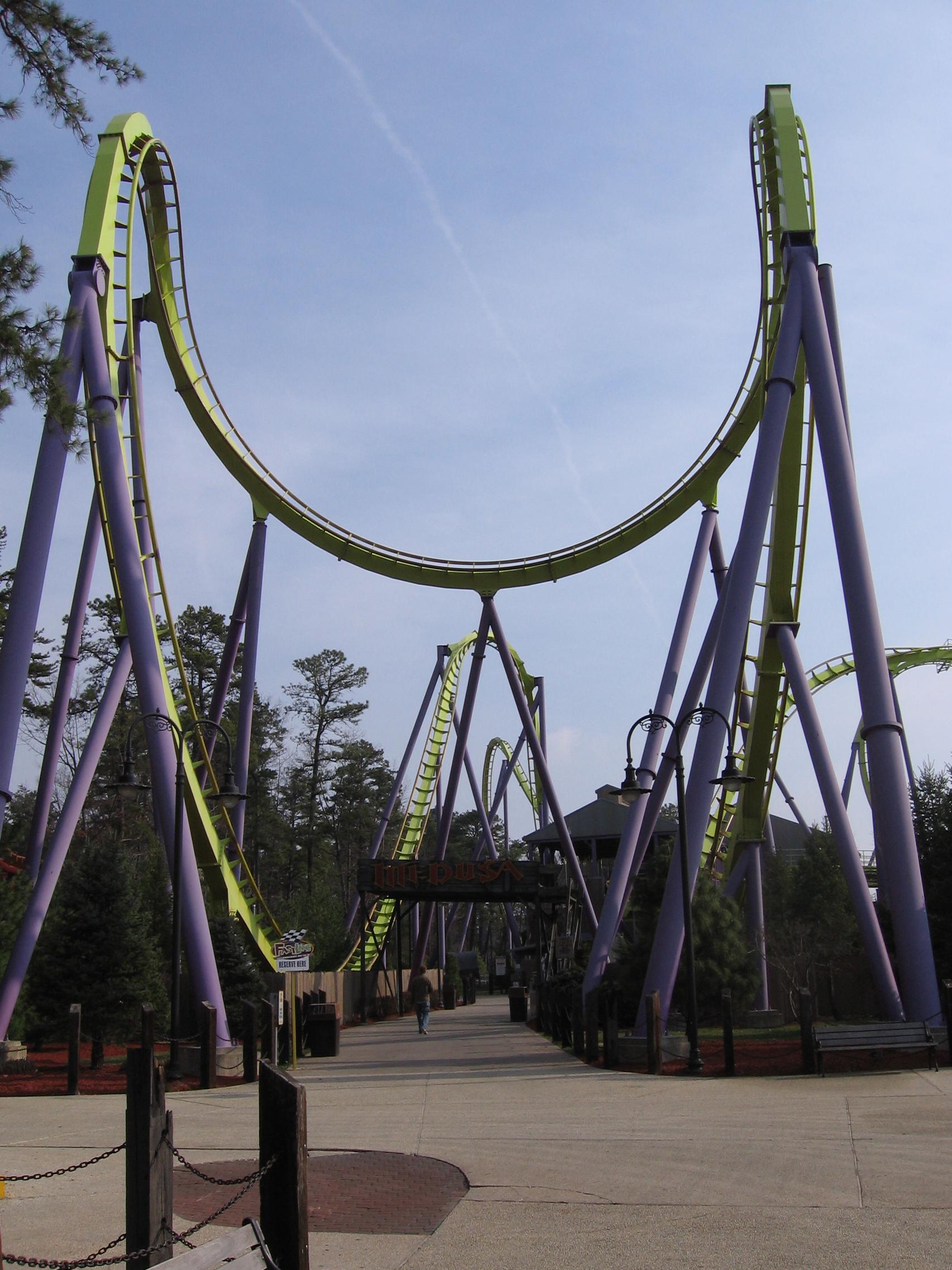
Medusa's cobra roll at Six Flags Great Adventure

According to Walter Bolliger, development of the Floorless Coaster began between 1995 and 1996. In 1999, the world's first Floorless Coaster opened at Six Flags Great Adventure as Medusa. With the success of Medusa, SeaWorld, Cedar Fair, Six Flags, and independent parks, Janfusun Fancyworld, Parque Warner Madrid, Tivoli Gardens, and Ocean Park Hong Kong have built other coasters of this model at their parks. B&M has built 13 Floorless Coasters from the ground up, with Dominator at Kings Dominion being the only one relocated to another park. They have also converted three of their stand-up roller coasters to Floorless Coasters: Rougarou at Cedar Point, Patriot at California's Great America, and Firebird at Six Flags America.

== Design ==
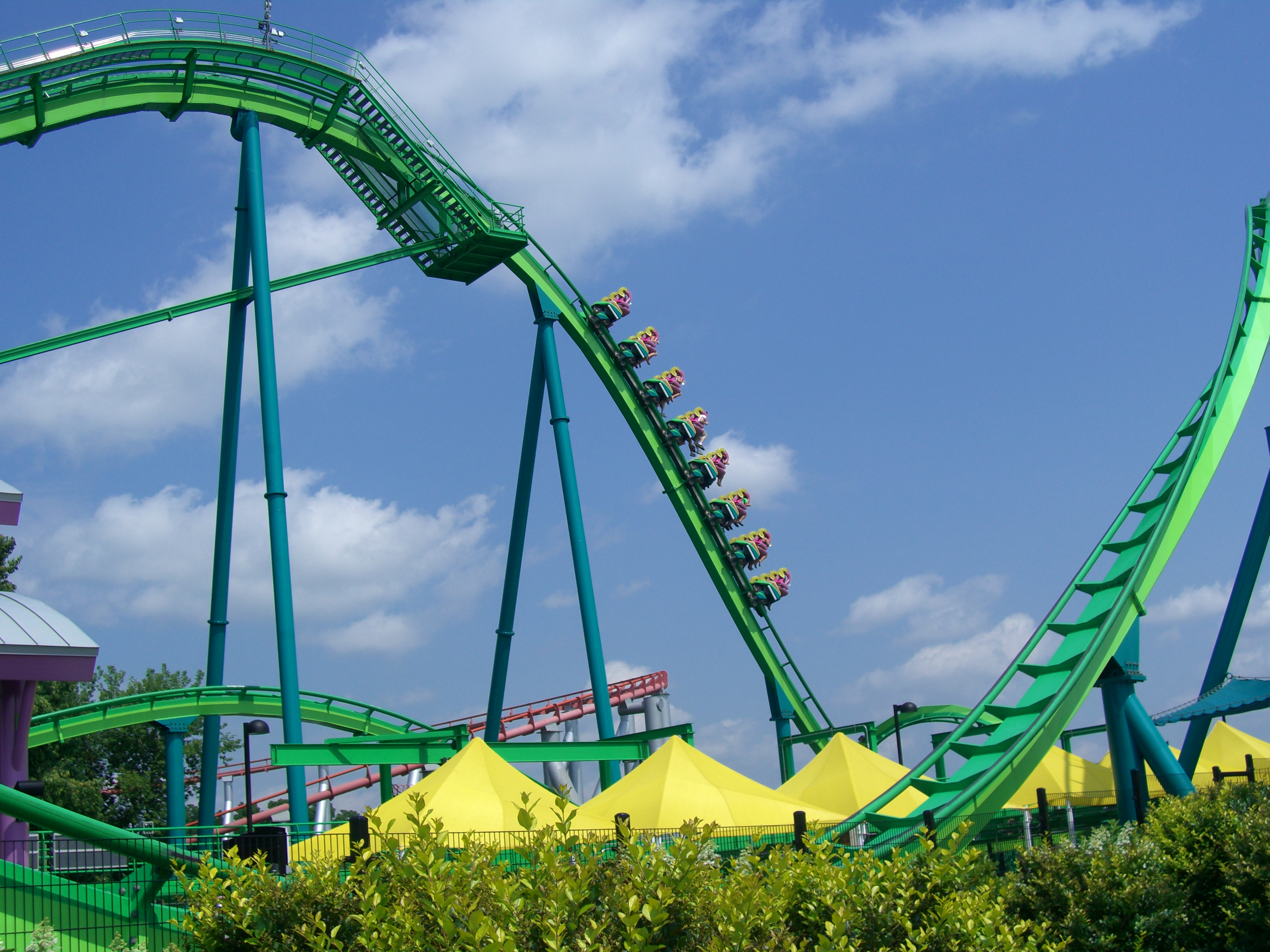
Hydra the Revenge's first drop at Dorney Park & Wildwater Kingdom

The design of a Floorless Coaster has one main difference from traditional steel roller coasters around the world: there is no floor under the seats. While a train is parked in the station, a floor is used only for loading and unloading purposes. Because the front row has nothing in front of it to stop riders from walking over the edge of the station, a gate is placed in front of the train to prevent this from happening. Once all the over-the-shoulder restraints are locked, the floor separates into several pieces and retracts underneath the station. The gate then opens, allowing the train to move forward. When the train returns to the station, the floor is brought back up and the gate is closed for the next group of riders to load and unload. Aside from the station, Floorless Coasters have similar layouts to B&M's sit-down coasters.

== Installations ==
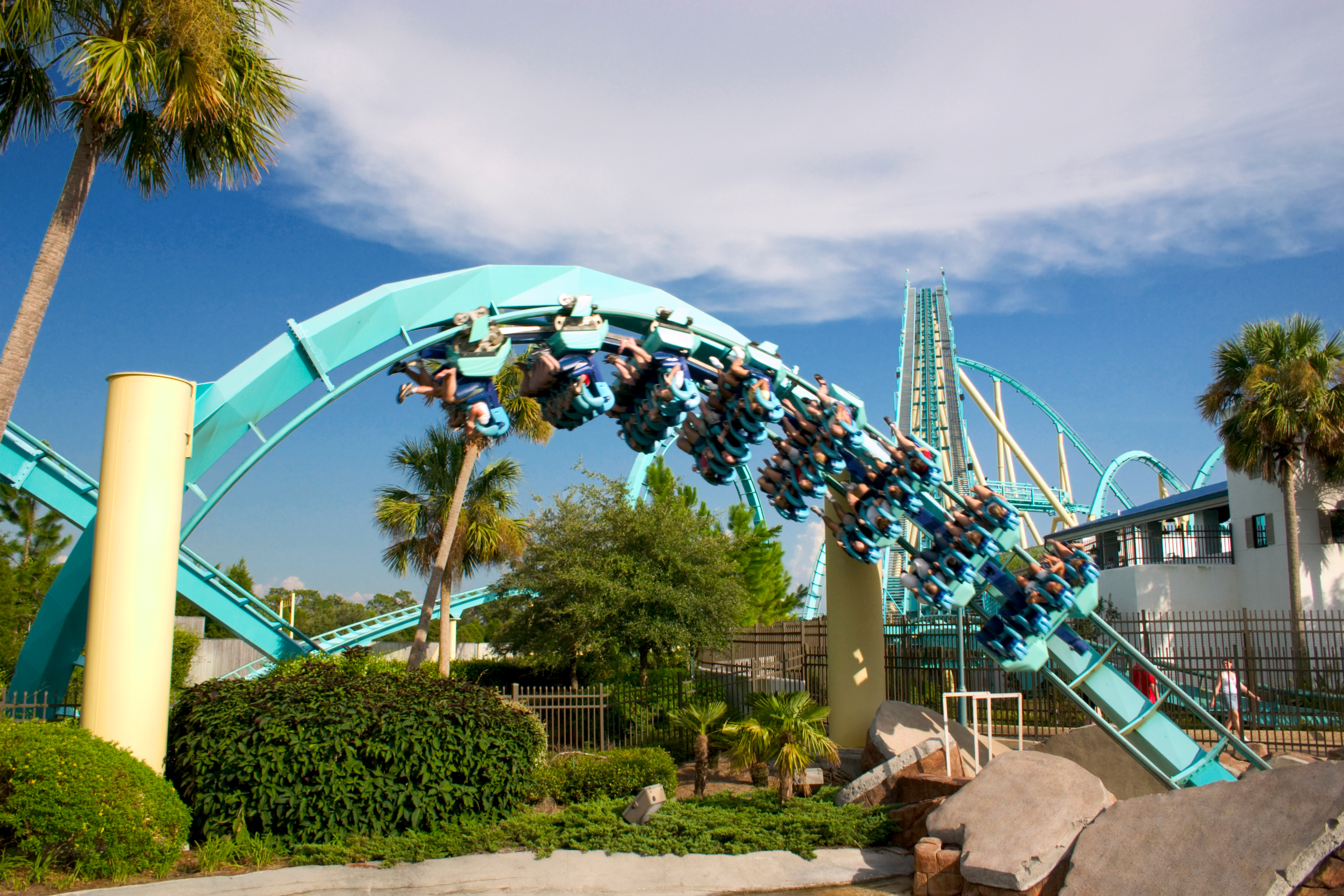
One of Kraken's trains going through a corkscrew at SeaWorld Orlando in Orlando, Florida.

Bolliger & Mabillard has built thirteen Floorless Coasters from the ground up, with three additional that were converted from stand-up roller coasters. The roller coasters are listed in order of opening dates.

| Name | Park | Country | Inversions | Opened | Status |
|---|---|---|---|---|---|
| Medusa; Formerly Bizarro | Six Flags Great Adventure | United States | 7 | 2 April 1999 | Operating |
| Superman: Krypton Coaster | Six Flags Fiesta Texas | United States | 6 | 11 March 2000 | Operating |
| Medusa | Six Flags Discovery Kingdom | United States | 7 | 18 March 2000 | Operating |
| Kraken | SeaWorld Orlando | United States | 7 | 1 June 2000 | Operating |
| Insane Speed | Janfusun Fancyworld | Taiwan | 4 | 2001 | Operating |
| Superman: La Atracción de Acero | Parque Warner Madrid | Spain | 7 | 6 April 2002 | Operating |
| Batman: The Dark Knight | Six Flags New England | United States | 5 | 20 April 2002 | Operating |
| Scream | Six Flags Magic Mountain | United States | 7 | 12 April 2003 | Operating |
| Dæmonen | Tivoli Gardens | Denmark | 3 | 16 April 2004 | Operating |
| Hydra the Revenge | Dorney Park & Wildwater Kingdom | United States | 7 | 7 May 2005 | Operating |
| Dominator; Formerly Batman: Knight Flight | Kings Dominion; Geauga Lake | United States | 5 | 24 May 2008; 5 May 2000 | Operating; Closed 16 September 2007 |
| Hair Raiser | Ocean Park Hong Kong | Hong Kong | 4 | 8 December 2011 | Operating |
| Nitro | Adlabs Imagica | India | 5 | October 2013 | Operating |
| Rougarou (Note: Converted from a stand-up roller coaster to a floorless coaster) | Cedar Point | United States | 4 | 9 May 2015 | Operating |
| Patriot | California's Great America | United States | 2 | 25 March 2017 | Operating |
| Firebird | Six Flags America | United States | 2 | 17 May 2019 | Closed |

Note: Although nearly all Dive Coasters (such as SheiKra, Griffon, Valravn and Yukon Striker) feature floorless trains, they are not considered Floorless Coasters.

== Similar rides ==
Maurer Söhne, a German roller coaster and steel manufacturer, has developed their own version of the Floorless Coaster called the X-Car Floorless. The car is the same as the original X-Car with the only difference being that there is no floor during the ride. As of 2019, no X-Car Floorless roller coasters have been manufactured.

Mack Rides is currently constructing a floorless spinning coaster at Six Flags Great Adventure, which is set for a 2027 opening.

== See also ==
- Dive Coaster, a type of roller coaster also designed by Bolliger & Mabillard, that feature floorless trains on some models.
