= Parque Warner Madrid =

Theme park southeast of Madrid, Spain

- Previously known as Warner Bros. Movie World Madrid (2002–2006); Warner Bros. Park Madrid (2002–2006)

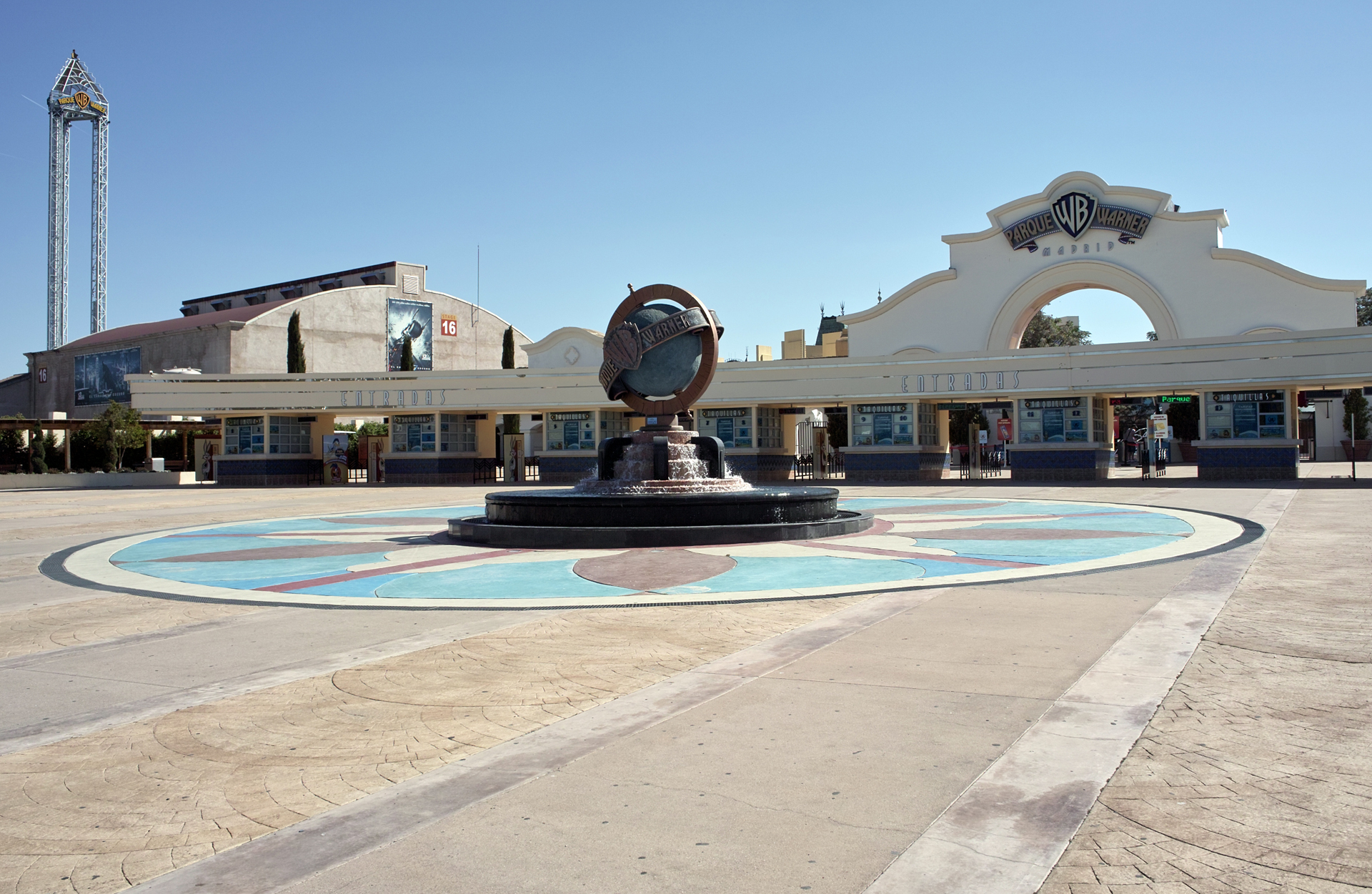
- Parque Warner Madrid main entrance
- Interactive map of Parque Warner Madrid
- Location: San Martín de la Vega, Community of Madrid, Spain
- Coordinates: 40.2300°N 3.5937°W
- Opened: 6 April 2002; 24 years ago
- Owner: Parques Reunidos (park operator); Inveravante (land owner)
- Operated by: Parques Reunidos
- Theme: Warner Bros.

Attractions
- Total: 43
- Roller coasters: 7
- Website: Official website

Parque Warner Madrid is a theme park located 23 km (14 miles) southeast of Madrid, Spain, in the municipality of San Martín de la Vega. The park opened as Warner Bros. Movie World Madrid/Warner Bros. Park Madrid on 6 April 2002 and was owned by numerous Spanish investment groups, with Six Flags operating the park as part of the deal. In November 2004, the management arrangement with Six Flags was terminated, with the name change to Parque Warner Madrid occurring at the start of 2006.

The park is currently owned by Inveravante and operated by Parques Reunidos.

== History ==
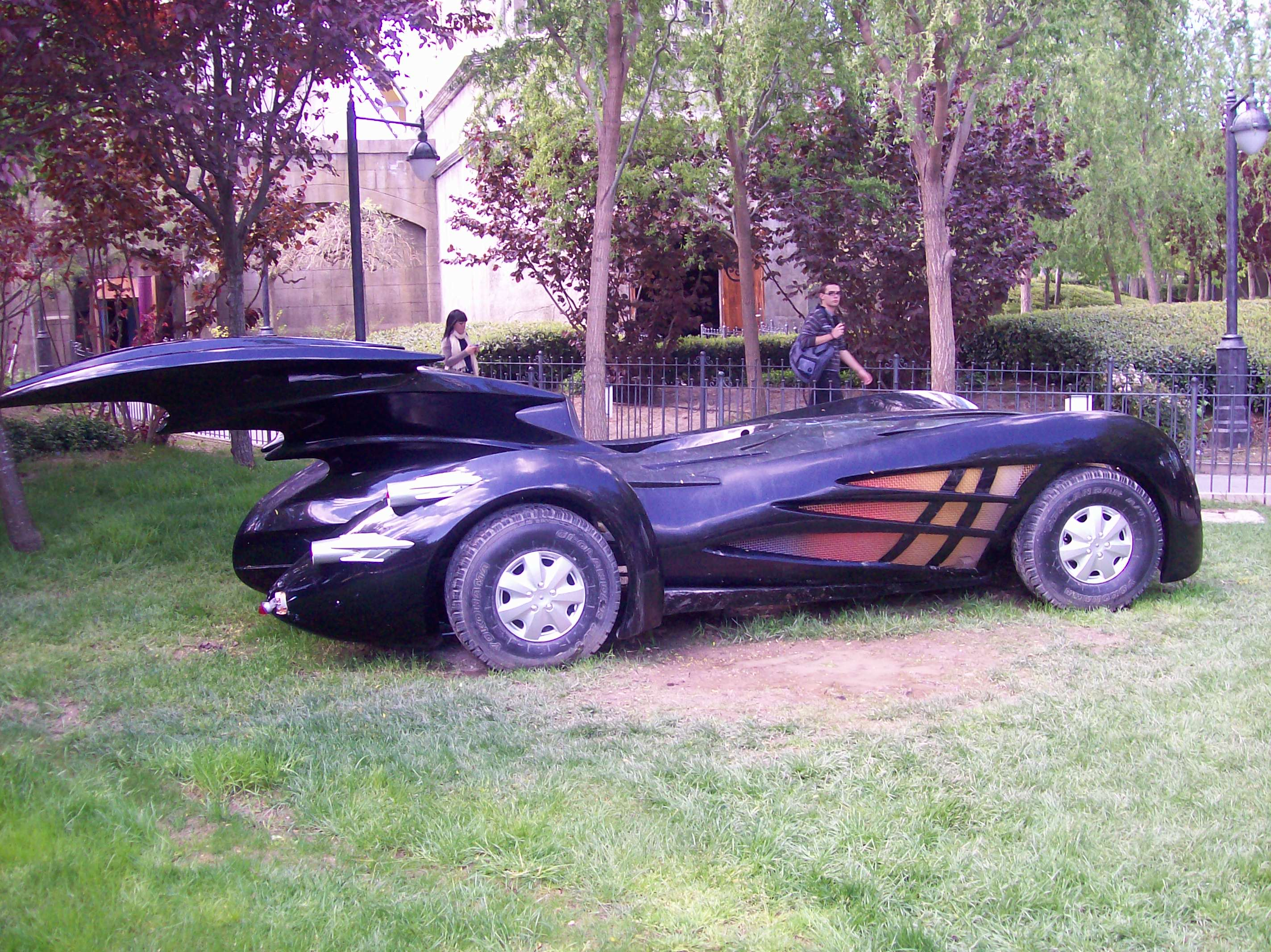
Batmobile in Parque Warner Madrid

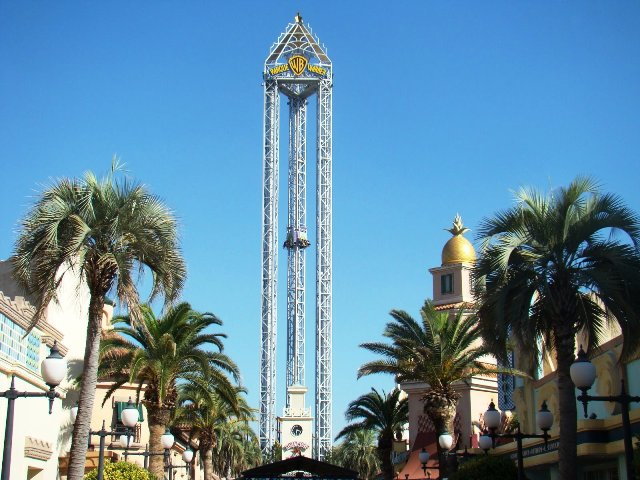
La Venganza del Enigma

The park was originally built and operated as Warner Bros. Movie World Madrid, alternatively known as Warner Bros. Park Madrid. The park was built as part of a joint-venture of various shareholders, with the Community of Madrid, holding the highest of 40% and Caja Madrid holding the second highest at 20%. Other minor shareholders were Fadesa (15%), El Corte Inglés (5%), NH Hotels (5%), Six Flags (5%) and construction companies Dragados, ACS, Ferrovial, Necso and FCC (each with 2%). Six Flags also operated the park for the shareholders.

The park held its grand opening on 5 April 2002 with 10,000 invited guests including Bo Derek and Christopher Lambert as special guests. The park was opened to the general public on 6 April 2002.

On 3 April 2004, Six Flags sold its European Parks division including sister park Warner Bros. Movie World Germany to Palamon Capital Partners, becoming StarParks. Warner Bros. Movie World Madrid was not included in the sale and on November 23, 2004, it was announced that Six Flags' 99-year contract to operate the park was terminated, allowing the park's management to operate the park from then on, and continuing to allow the use to use Warner Bros. properties. Six Flags' stake in the park was transitioned off to Warner Bros. Entertainment itself.

In 2006, the park was renamed as "Parque Warner Madrid". This season saw the premiere of two new shows, Police Academy 2 and Batman Begins, the latter based on the latest movie from Warner Brothers and DC Comics. Both received good reviews from visitors to the park. In November 2006, the Community of Madrid sold their stake in the park to Fadesa, who by then had held 73% shares in the park. After the sale, Parques Reunidos were announced by Fadesa to operate the park as part of a ten-year agreement. In February 2007, Fadesa announced an agreement that would allow Parques Reunidos to purchase the park within a two-three year span. Following the bankruptcy of Fadesa, Parques Reunidos fully purchased out all the shareholders of the park to fully own and operate the park, with Warner Bros. retaining its 5% stake.

The 2008 season saw two further developments: a water attraction called Oso Yogui and a new show, The Music of Bugs Bunny, based around the glamour of Hollywood in a performance reminiscent of the great Broadway musicals. Following the new ownership, the park gave its first yearly profit after operating on a loss over the previous few years.

In June 2014, a water park, Parque Warner Beach, was opened. The €8.5 million park spans 30,000 square metres (320,000 sq ft) and features two wave pools, a lazy river and two water play areas. Like parts of the original theme park, Parque Warner Beach is themed around Looney Tunes, Hanna-Barbera and DC Comics characters.

== Attractions ==
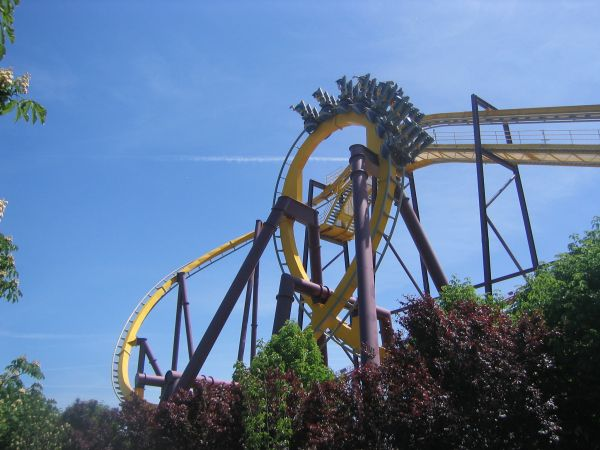
Shadows of Arkham

Among its roller coasters, highlights include Superman: La Atracción de Acero, a first in Europe with its floorless trains, Shadows of Arkham, an inverted roller coaster, Coaster-Express, a wooden coaster and Stunt Fall, a giant inverted boomerang offering guests a vertical drop of 54.4 m reaching a top speed of 115 km/h. Another prominent attraction is La Venganza del Enigma, a structure 100 meters high that drops visitors at 80 km/h.

Other attractions at the park include Correcaminos Bip, Bip, a Wile E. Coyote and the Road Runner coaster which delivers high speeds and drops (though it has no inversions) and La Aventura de Scooby-Doo, an interactive ride for families, manufactured by US firm Sally Corporation.

=== List of attractions ===
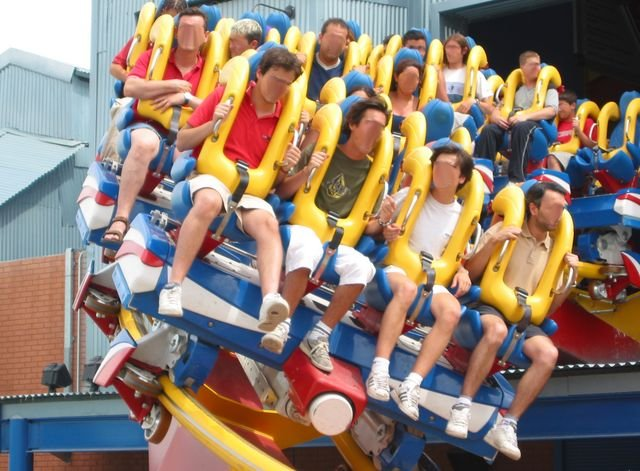
Superman: La Atracción de Acero

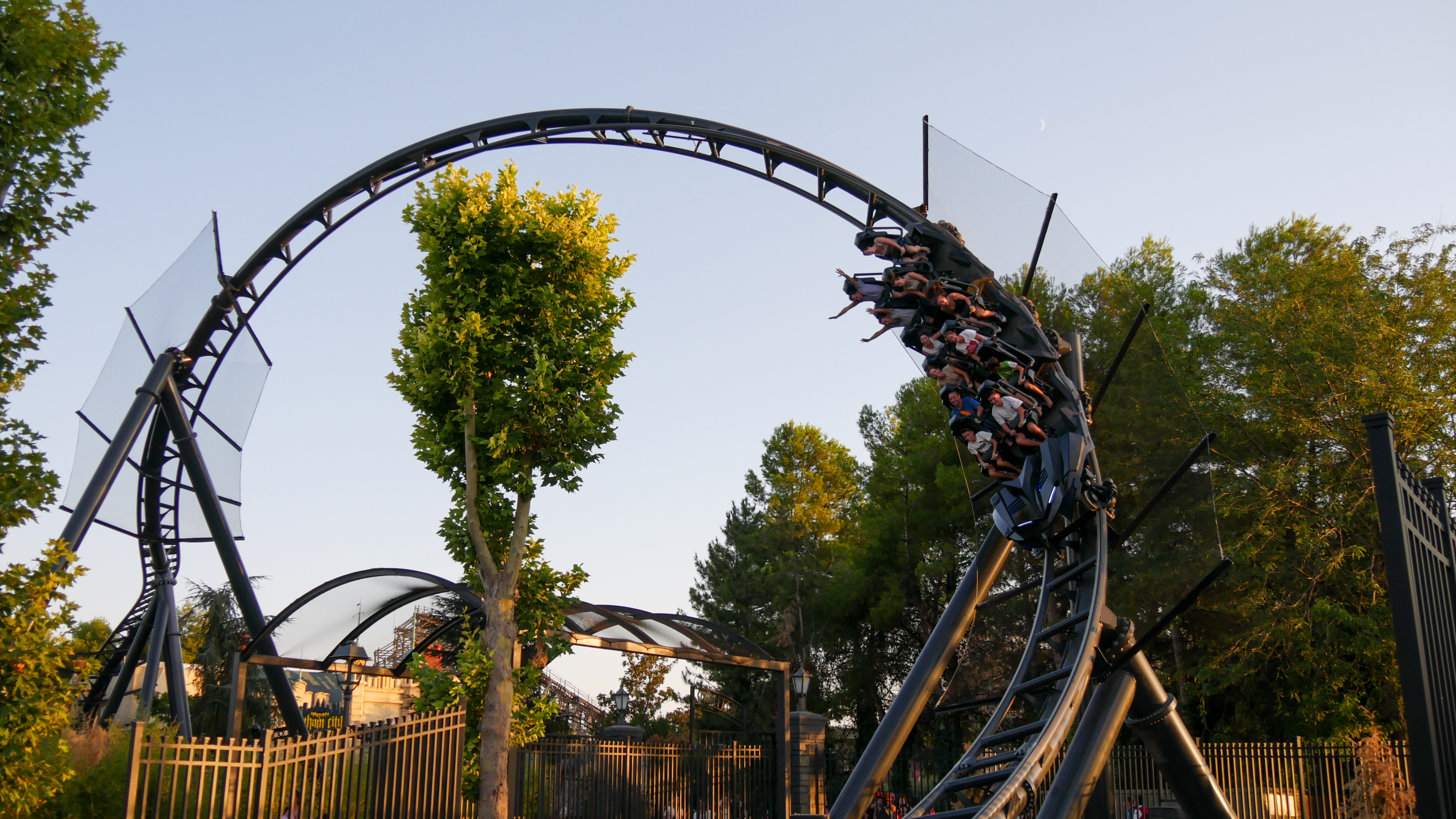
Batman Gotham City Escape

Name	Section	Type	Manufacturer	Opened
Thrill rides
Shadows of Arkham	DC Super Heroes World	inverted roller coaster	Bolliger & Mabillard	April 2002
Superman: La Atracción de Acero	DC Super Heroes World	floorless roller coaster	Bolliger & Mabillard	April 2002
Batman Gotham City Escape	DC Super Heroes World	launched roller coaster	Intamin	May 2023
Lex Luthor Invertatron	DC Super Heroes World	Top Spin	HUSS	2002
Coaster-Express	Old West Territory	wooden coaster	RCCA	April 2002
La Venganza del Enigma	DC Super Heroes World	Combo Tower	S&S Power	2002
Stunt Fall	Movie World Studios	Giant Inverted Boomerang	Vekoma	August 2002
Family rides
Cataratas Salvajes	Old West Territory	Super Flume	Intamin	2002
Río Bravo	Old West Territory	Shoot the chutes	Intamin	2002
The Joker Coches de Choque	DC Super Heroes World	Bumper cars	Bertazzon	2002
Mr. Freeze Fábrica de Hielo	DC Super Heroes World	Wave Swinger	Zierer	2002
Oso Yogui	Movie World Studios	Splash Battle	Interlink	2009
Hotel Embrujado	Movie World Studios	Madhouse	Vekoma	April 2002
Scooby Doo's Tea Party Mystery	Cartoon Village	Teacups	Zamperla	2002
Rápidos ACME	Cartoon Village	River rapids	Intamin	2002
Los Carros de la Mina	Cartoon Village	Break Dance 3	HUSS	2002
Tom & Jerry Picnic en el Parque	Cartoon Village	Large Tivoli	Zierer	2002
Correcaminos Bip Bip	Cartoon Village	Götterblitz Youngstar Coaster	Mack Rides	May 2009
Children's rides
Academia de Pilotos Baby Looney Tunes	Cartoon Village	Mini-Jet	Zamperla	2013
ACME Juegos de Agua	Cartoon Village	Water Playground		2002
¡A Toda Máquina!	Cartoon Village	Rockin' Tug	Zamperla	2011
Cartoon Carousel	Cartoon Village	Carousel	Chance Morgan	2002
Cine Tour	Movie World Studios	Slot Car Ride	Martín Atracciones	2002
Convoy de Camiones	Cartoon Village	Convoy	Zamperla	2002
Emergencias Pato Lucas	Cartoon Village	Fire Patrol	Zamperla	2011
Escuela de Conduccion Yabba-Dabba-Doo				2011
He visto un Lindo Gatito	Cartoon Village	Kite Flyer	Zamperla	2011
La Aventura de Scooby-Doo	Cartoon Village	Interactive Dark Ride	Sally Corporation	June 2005
La Captura de Gossamer	Cartoon Village	Helicopters	Visa Int.	2002
Looney Tunes Correo Aéreo	Cartoon Village	Aircraft	Zamperla	2002
Marvin el Marciano Cohetes Espaciales	Cartoon Village	Jump Around	Zamperla	2002
Pato Lucas Coches Locos	Cartoon Village	Mini Bumper Cars	Bertazzon	2002
Piolín y Silvestre Paseo en Autobús	Cartoon Village	Crazy Bus	Zamperla	2002
Wile E. Coyote Zona de Explosión	Cartoon Village	Jumpin’ Star	Zamperla	2002

== See also ==
- Warner Bros. Movie World
- Warner Bros. World Abu Dhabi
- Warner Bros. Discovery Global Experiences
