= Shadows of Arkham =

Roller coaster amusement park ride in Spain

- Previously known as Batman la Fuga (2002-2017); Batman: Arkham Asylum (2017-2023)
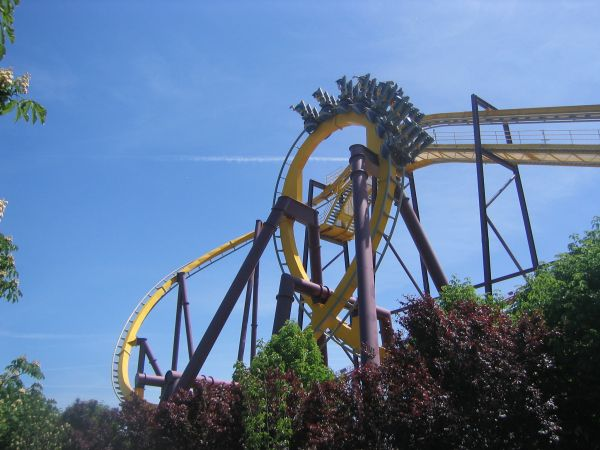

Parque Warner Madrid
- Location: Parque Warner Madrid
- Park section: DC Super Heroes World
- Coordinates: 40.228183°N 3.592378°W
- Status: Operating
- Opening date: 6 April 2002; 24 years ago

General statistics
- Type: Steel – Inverted
- Manufacturer: Bolliger & Mabillard
- Model: Inverted Coaster (Batman)
- Lift/launch system: Chain lift hill
- Height: 105 ft (32 m)
- Length: 2,700.2 ft (823.0 m)
- Speed: 49.7 mph (80.0 km/h)
- Inversions: 5
- Duration: 1:15
- G-force: 4.9
- Height restriction: 52 in (132 cm)
- Shadows of Arkham at RCDB

Shadows of Arkham is a steel roller coaster at Parque Warner Madrid in Spain. It is located in the "DC Super Heroes World" location in the park. It is an inverted roller coaster manufactured by Bolliger & Mabillard, and a mirrored clone of Batman: The Ride, the inverted roller coaster located at several Six Flags parks in the United States. The ride formerly operated under the name Batman la Fuga (English: Batman the Escape) from 2002 to 2017, when it was changed to Batman: Arkham Asylum. The name was again changed in 2023 to Shadows of Arkham, coinciding with the opening of the park's Intamin launched roller coaster, Batman Gotham City Escape.

== History ==
The ride is 1 minute 15 seconds long, and opened on 6 April 2002 along with Parque Warner Madrid. The color scheme of the ride is yellow and blue.

In 2017, the ride was equipped with new virtual reality glasses, making it the first virtual reality coaster in Spain.

In early 2024, the ride underwent minor thematic updates, adding more interactive queue elements and projection mapping.
