= Tigris (roller coaster) =

Ride at Busch Gardens Tampa Bay

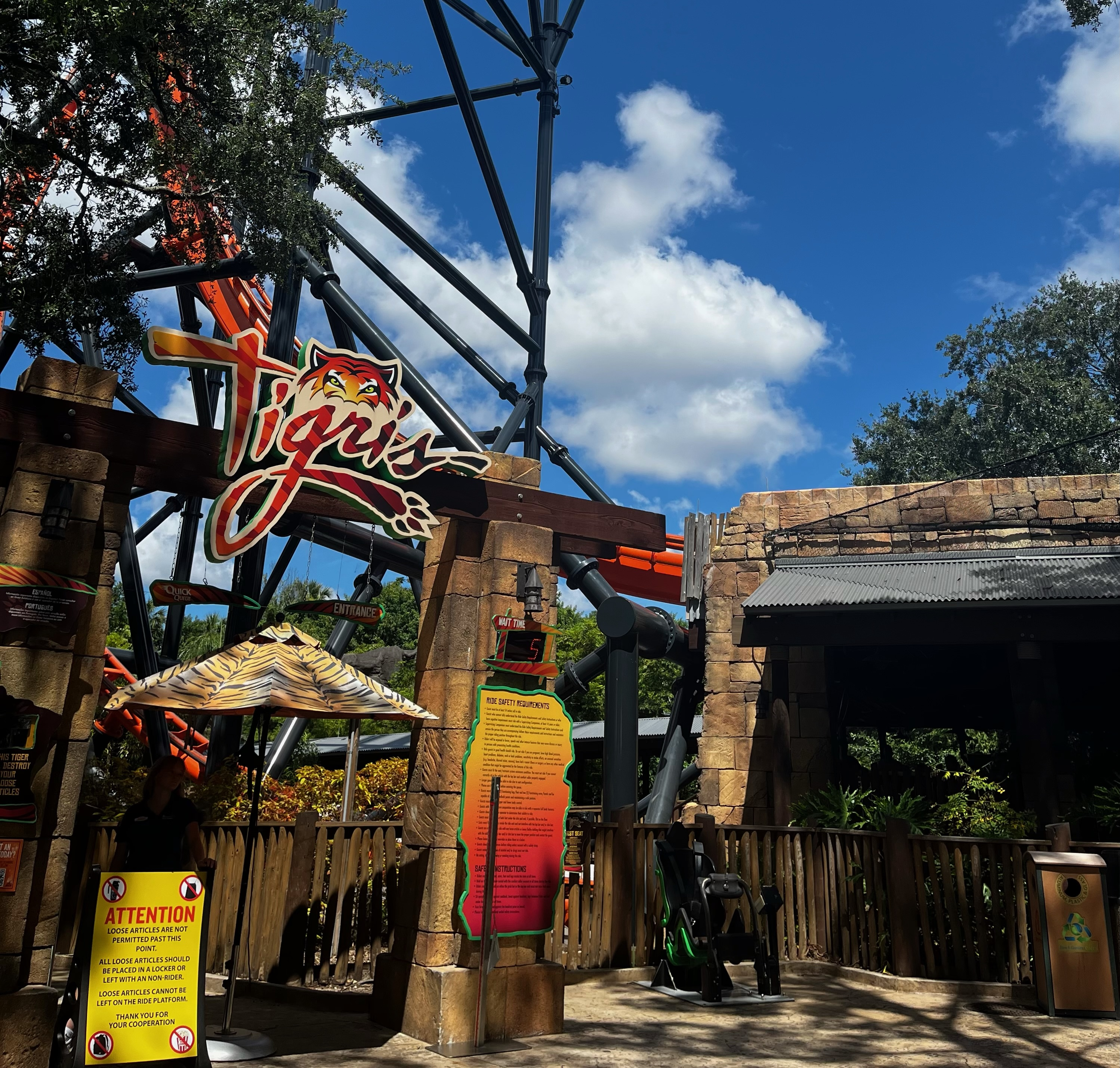
- View of Tigris from the entrance to the queue

Busch Gardens Tampa Bay
- Location: Busch Gardens Tampa Bay
- Park section: Stanleyville
- Coordinates: 28°02′16″N 82°25′30″W
- Status: Operating
- Soft opening date: April 16, 2019
- Opening date: April 19, 2019
- Replaced: Tanganyika Tidal Wave

General statistics
- Type: Steel – Launched
- Manufacturer: Premier Rides
- Model: Sky Rocket II
- Lift/launch system: LSM Launch
- Height: 150 ft (46 m)
- Drop: 135 ft (41 m)
- Length: 863 ft (263 m)
- Speed: 62 mph (100 km/h)
- Inversions: 1
- Height restriction: 54 in (137 cm)
- Trains: Single train with 3 cars; riders arranged 2 across in 3 rows for a total of 18 riders per train
- Website: Official site
- Quick Queue available
- Tigris at RCDB

Tigris is a steel launched roller coaster at Busch Gardens Tampa Bay theme park in Tampa, Florida, United States. Built on the former Tanganyika Tidal Wave water ride, Tigris officially opened on April 19, 2019 as the park's ninth roller coaster. Tigris is located within the Stanleyville section of the park. The roller coaster and surrounding area re-uses previous infrastructure and landscaping of the former attraction.

Manufactured by Premier Rides, the roller coaster is one of ten Sky Rocket II models built. Tigris utilizes a linear synchronous motor (LSM) system to propel the train through three launches. The roller coaster reaches a maximum height of 150 ft (46 m), a maximum speed of 62 mph (100 km/h), and has a total track length of 863 ft (263 m), though riders traverse around 1,800 ft (550 m) of track. Upon opening, the roller coaster received positive reviews from critics.

== History ==
The Tanganyika Tidal Wave, an African-themed shoot the chutes water ride, closed in April 2016. In March 2018, SeaWorld Entertainment (owner of Busch Gardens Tampa Bay) filed trademarks with the United States Patent and Trademark Office for the name "Tigris", in addition to "Twisted Tiger" and "Uproar". In April 2018, demolition permits were filed for the water ride's deconstruction. Demolition of the former water ride began in June 2018.

An environmental resource permit was submitted on June 26, 2018, to the Southwest Florida Water Management District revealing the location of a new attraction to be within the confines of the tiger exhibit and section of Jungala. The documents and permits, reported in July, discussed upcoming developments on the site of the prior water ride under the working title "Project TEEL". The project proposed to construct a 3,230 sq ft (300 m^{2}) building within a 19,683 sq ft (1,828.6 m^{2}) area consisting of the attraction and paths and to remove 40,185 sq ft (3,733.3 m^{2}) within the existing area.

Busch Gardens Tampa Bay announced Tigris, a Premier Rides Sky Rocket II, model on September 12, 2018. The announcement revealed the roller coaster would be themed to the tiger and open in 2019 along with a development for a Gwazi area attraction in 2020. In October 2018, the concrete footers for the roller coaster were completed and the first construction updates by the park were published. During the International Association of Amusement Parks and Attractions (IAAPA) exposition in November 2018, the design of Tigris's cars were revealed by Premier Rides in the form of a cake. The roller coaster's track began arriving at the park on November 29, 2018, with vertical construction of the track pieces taking place on December 3, 2018.

The park detailed the support structure of Tigris was around three-fifths complete by January 2019, with construction of the roller coaster complete by February. The train for Tigris was observed being lifted onto the track on February 20. Busch Gardens announced a media event to present the roller coaster's car alongside additional information on the Gwazi attraction. The train for the roller coaster was publicly displayed for parkgoers beginning on March 1. The roller coaster's opening date was announced by the park on April 4, with Tigris soft opening on April 16, 2019, and officially opening on April 19.

== Ride experience ==
=== Queue ===
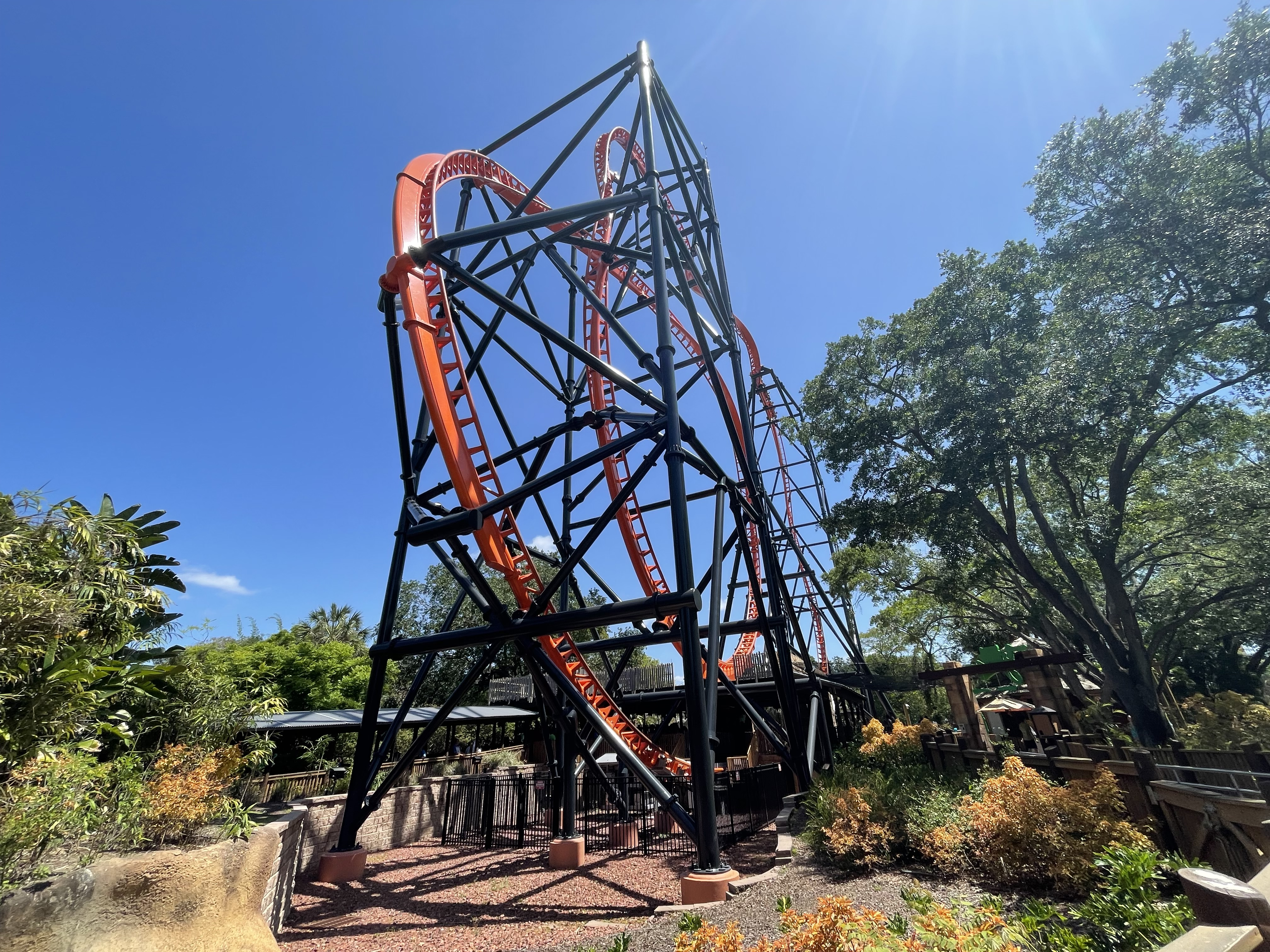
Tigris as shown from the queue line

The queue area of the ride was repurposed from the previous attraction, Tanganyika Tidal Wave, though the water rides station was not reused. The roller coaster's queue uses a part of the water ride's pathway with landscaping intact from the previous layout. The queue of the ride features educational pieces of the tiger's living conditions in the wild and actions wildlife conservationists take with the species.

=== Layout ===
Tigris launches out of the station up into a partial twist. The train then falls back through the station, where it is accelerated backwards into another twist. Once again, the train falls forward into the station and riders are accelerated to a top speed of 62 mph (100 km/h). It then travels up to a height of 150 ft (46 m) where it completes a half-loop and a heartline roll before exiting in a second non-inverting half-loop. It then enters a full non-inverting loop before returning to the station.

== Characteristics ==
Tigris operates within a small footprint of the former attraction and is located within the Stanleyville section of the park. For the construction of the roller coaster, existing infrastructure in the land was reused for the purpose of the ride. The landscape was preserved with recycled materials from the previous Tanganyika Tidal Wave water ride and other byproducts from the construction of Falcon's Fury and Cobra's Curse attractions. Tigris was the third Sky Rocket II model to be constructed at SeaWorld Parks & Entertainment-owned theme parks, the first being Tempesto at sister park Busch Gardens Williamsburg and the second, Electric Eel, at SeaWorld San Diego. The roller coaster is one of ten Sky Rocket II models built by Premier Rides.

Tigris was the ninth roller coaster built at Busch Gardens Tampa Bay in operation. The roller coaster features black-gray supports with bright orange track. The roller coaster uses a linear synchronous motor (LSM) launch system that adjusts the speed of each launch by timing the train's position through sensors. The LSM launch system is cooled by air blowers beneath the track. The roller coaster has a total track length of 863 ft (263 m), though riders traverse around 1,800 ft (550 m) of track because of the forward and backward launches. Tigris operates one train featuring three cars, with each car having a row of two seats across in three rows for a total of eighteen riders per train. The cars originally featured both a lap bar and over the shoulder restraint system, although the latter functioned more per formatively rather than as a secondary mechanism and was permanently removed in December 2025. The roller coaster train features an orange color scheme with tiger print.

== Reception ==
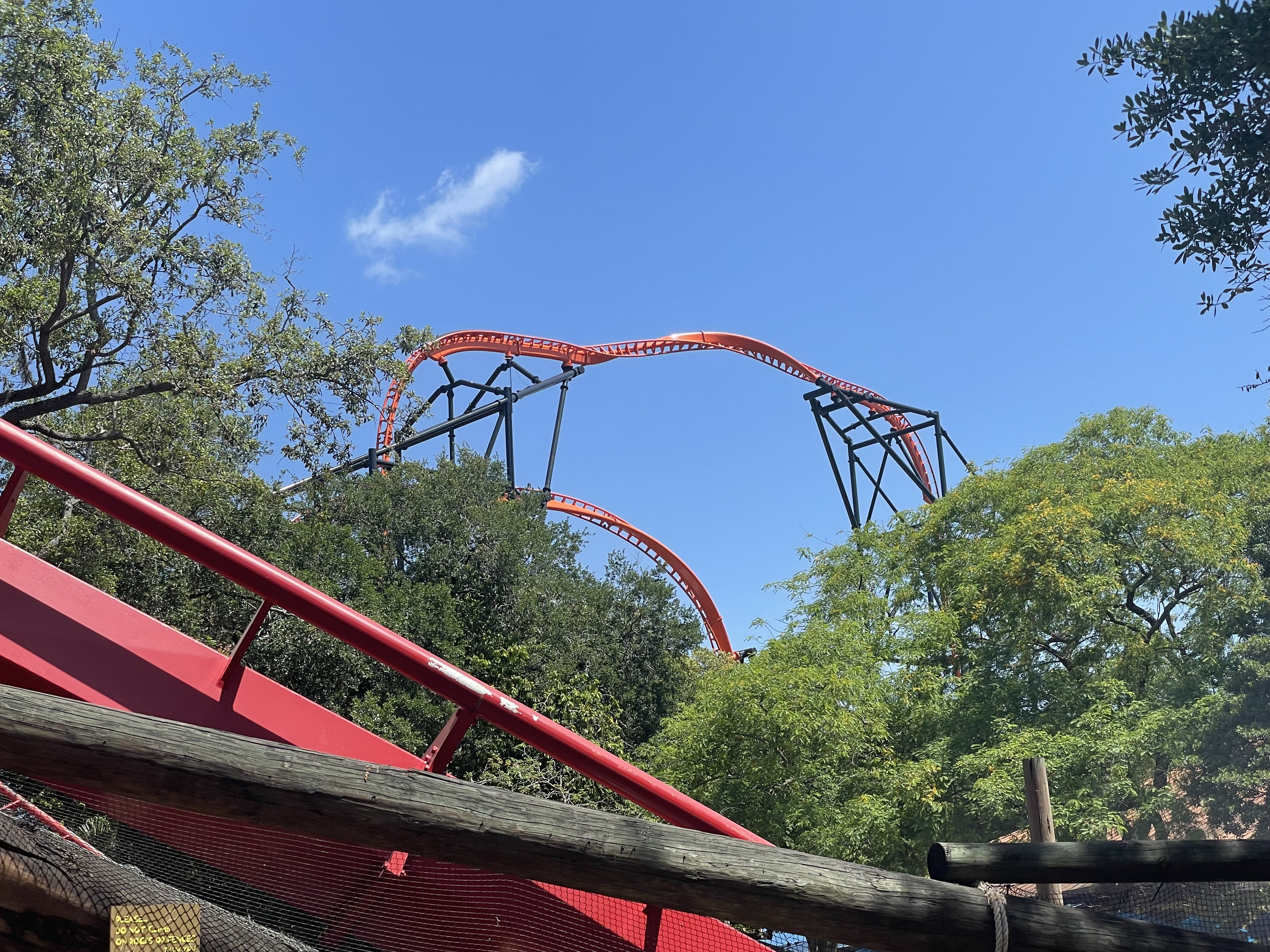
A view of Tigris among the trees with SheiKra in the foreground

Upon opening, Tigris received positive review from critics. A writer for the Tampa Bay Times, Daniel Figueroa IV, enthusiastically remarked about the roller coaster's overall intensity and its "visually impressive" speed. Figueroa IV further commented that any seat on the roller coaster had favorable moments to experience, with the front being more visually notable and the back for more intensity. A writer for the Orlando Sentinel, Dewayne Bevil, noted overall about the thrilling experience of the roller coaster, being both "confusing and...exciting". Bevil also remarked about the ride experiences from different seating position and the restraint system having positive and negative aspects.

Haley Coomes of WKMG-TV described the "good first impression" the roller coaster operations left on her experience and personally added it earned "a top approval rating" between "the other Busch Gardens coaster giants". Andrew Stilwell of Coaster101 categorized Tigris as a mid-tier attraction for "thrill seekers" among other Busch Gardens roller coasters while praising its overall speed and different seating experiences.

== See also ==
- SheiKra, another roller coaster located within the Stanleyville area of Busch Gardens Tampa Bay
- Superman: Ultimate Flight (Six Flags Discovery Kingdom), another Sky Rocket II model
