= Sky Rocket =

Steel roller coaster at Kennywood

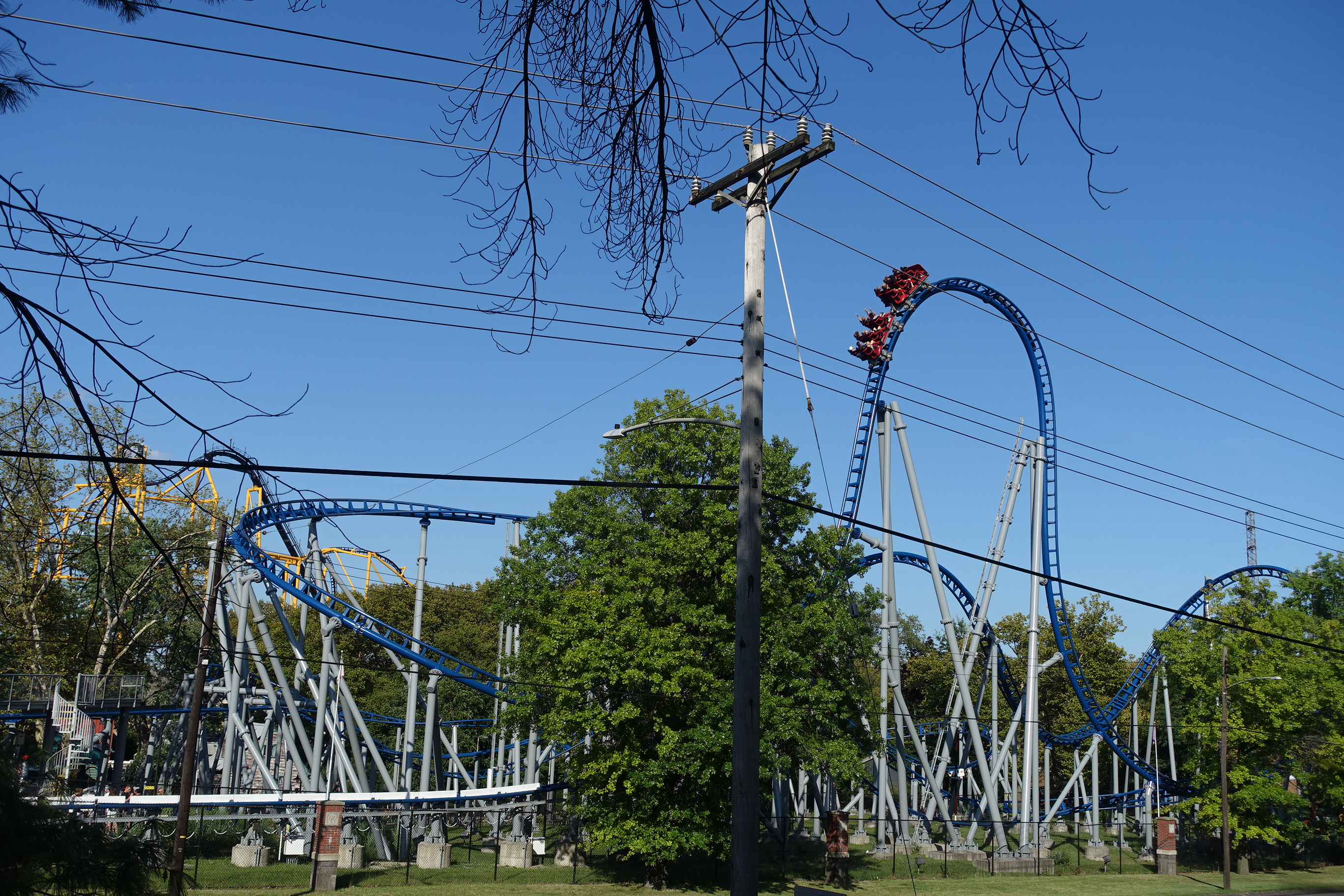

Kennywood
- Location: Kennywood
- Park section: Good Time Midway
- Coordinates: 40°23′11″N 79°51′53″W
- Status: Operating
- Opening date: June 29, 2010

General statistics
- Type: Steel
- Manufacturer: Premier Rides
- Lift/launch system: LSM launch
- Height: 95 ft (29 m)
- Length: 2,100 ft (640 m)
- Speed: 50 mph (80 km/h)
- Inversions: 3
- Duration: 1:05
- Max vertical angle: 90°
- Acceleration: 0 to 50 mph (0 to 80 km/h) in 3 seconds
- G-force: 4
- Height restriction: 52 in (132 cm)
- Trains: 2 trains with 2 cars. Riders are arranged 2 across in 3 rows for a total of 12 riders per train.
- Sky Rocket at RCDB

Sky Rocket is a steel roller coaster located at Kennywood amusement park in West Mifflin, Pennsylvania. Manufactured by Premier Rides, Sky Rocket opened to the public on June 29, 2010. It was the first major coaster addition at the park in almost a decade, following the renovation of Phantom's Revenge in 2001. It was also the first coaster in the park to feature inversions since Steel Phantom, as well as the first to have a launch since Laser Loop.

Sky Rocket is an electromagnetic launch coaster using linear synchronous motors (LSM), a first for Premier Rides' designs. Premier Rides had previously only used linear induction motors (LIM) launches on their coasters. It was also one of the first roller coasters in the world to feature a cutback inversion, a rather common element seen on more recent coasters.

Sky Rocket occupies the ground near the entrance formerly occupied by Turnpike, a former attraction that is expected to return to the park sometime in the future.

== History ==
On August 12, 2009, Kennywood announced the park would add a prototype linear synchronous motor (LSM) launched roller coaster built by Premier Rides for the 2010 season. The coaster did not have a name at the time of its announcement, but the park eventually decided on the name "Sky Rocket", after its ride model. To make space for Sky Rocket, Kennywood retired Turnpike, an antique electric car ride that had operated at the park since 1966. Turnpike closed on August 16, 2009 and its cars were placed in storage with the intent of being reopened sometime later, although as of 2026 this has not yet happened.

The coaster's track arrived at the park in January 2010. Construction of Sky Rocket was completed in the spring of 2010. The ride opened exclusively to media personnel on June 28, 2010, before officially opening to the public the following day.

For the 2017 season, riders were given the option of using a virtual reality headset when riding for a nominal fee of $5.

Due to damages caused by an electrical fire in the ride's engine room in May 2018, the ride was not open for the majority of the 2018 season. Park maintenance confirmed that the generator had been damaged beyond repair and a new one was being manufactured overseas. They also said they did not have an estimated date for reopening the ride at the time. The ride re-opened on July 14, 2019 following an announcement on Facebook.

== Ride experience ==
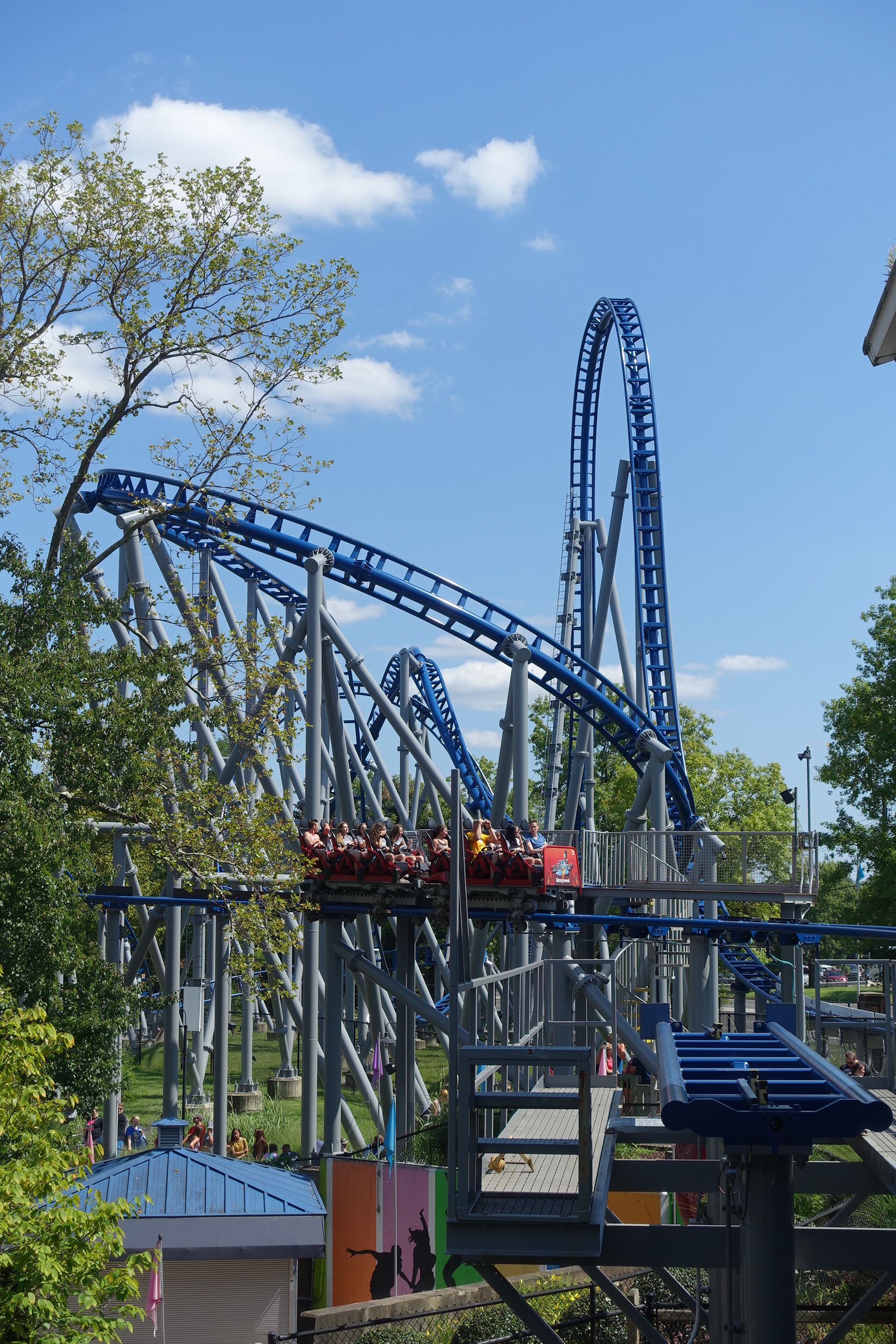
View of Sky Rocket from the ride's exit ramp

After exiting the station, the train turns 180 degrees. It then lines up with the launch motors and is accelerated from 0-50 mph (80 km/h) in 3 seconds. It goes up the 95 ft (29 m) top hat element. As it goes over the edge of the hill, the train is slowed by a holding brake before it plunges down the 90 degree drop and enters a cutback inversion: two half-corkscrews joined together in opposite directions so that the train exits moving 180 degrees from the direction it entered. It goes straight into a zero-G roll followed by a 180 degree upwards curve into the mid-course brake run. It comes almost to a complete stop only to plummet to the ground with a near-vertical drop. It goes into a low over-banked turn under the cutback, followed by a corkscrew over another piece of track, creating a head-chopper effect. It then goes into another over-banked turn, followed by a series of S-curves. It does one more 180 degree turn into a series of bunny hops under the corkscrew. It traverses one last twist into the final brake run.

== Trains ==
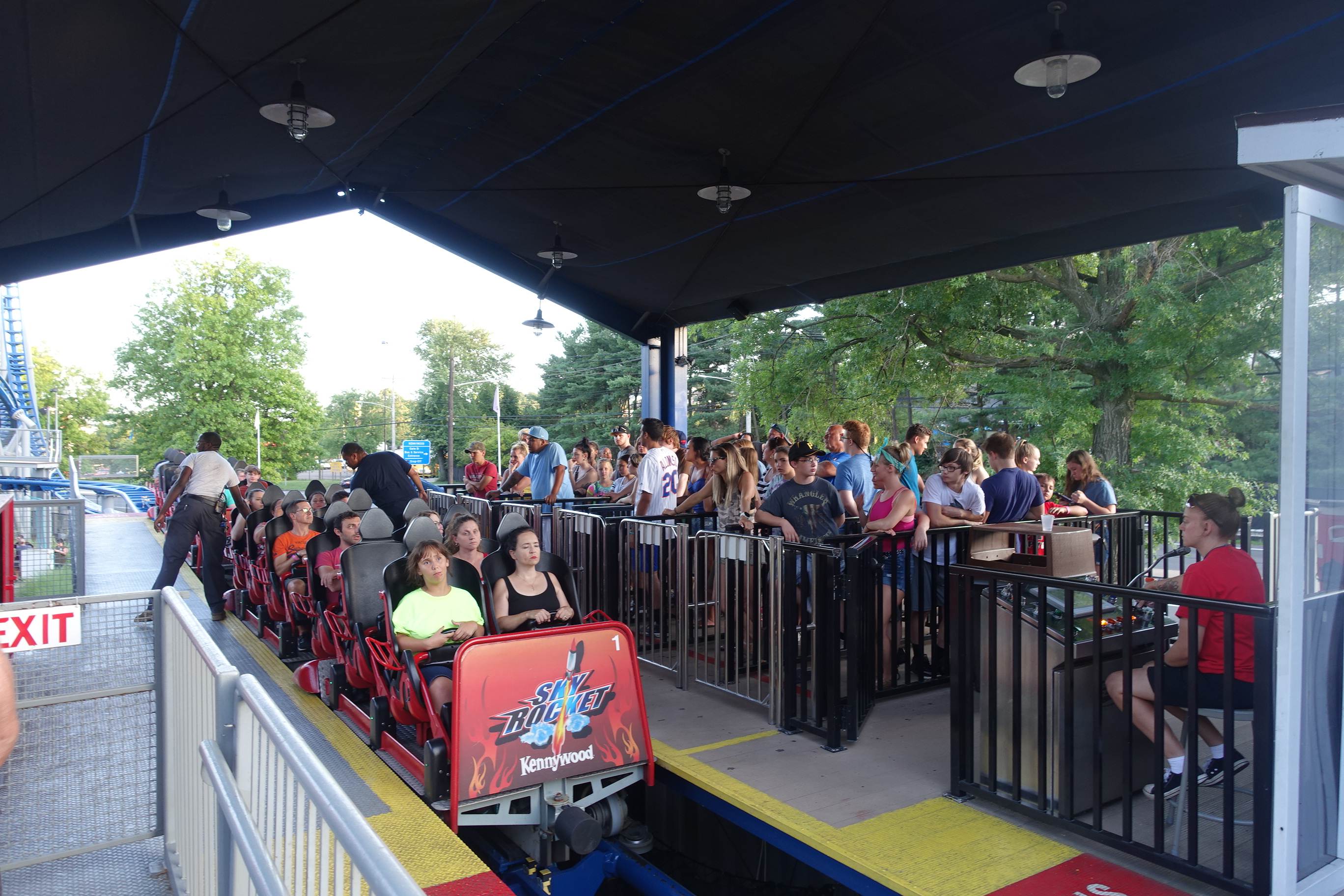
One of the coaster's trains parked in the station

The two trains are painted red and black with the ride's logo on the front, decorated with flame decals. Both trains have two cars which carry six riders each. The ride also features a lap bar restraint system.

== Awards ==
Golden Ticket Awards: Best New Ride for 2010
Ranking	3

Golden Ticket Awards: Top Steel Roller Coasters
Year									1998	1999
Ranking									–	–
Year	2000	2001	2002	2003	2004	2005	2006	2007	2008	2009
Ranking	–	–	–	–	–	–	–	–	–	–
Year	2010	2011	2012	2013	2014	2015	2016	2017	2018	2019
Ranking	17	44	–	–	–	–	–	–	–	–
Year	2020	2021	2022	2023	2024	2025				
Ranking	N/A	–	–	–	–	–				

== See also ==
- Superman: Ultimate Flight (Six Flags Discovery Kingdom), another Premier Rides roller coaster which is of the model considered by the manufacturer to be Sky Rocket's successor
