= Premier Rides =

American amusement ride manufacturer

Premier Rides, Inc.
- Type: Private company
- Founded: U.S. (1995)
- Headquarters: Baltimore, Maryland,, U.S.
- Area served: Worldwide
- Key people: Jim Seay; Randy Schmidt
- Products: Roller coasters Family attractions Water rides Observation Wheels & Towers
- Owner: Jim Seay
- Website: premier-rides.com

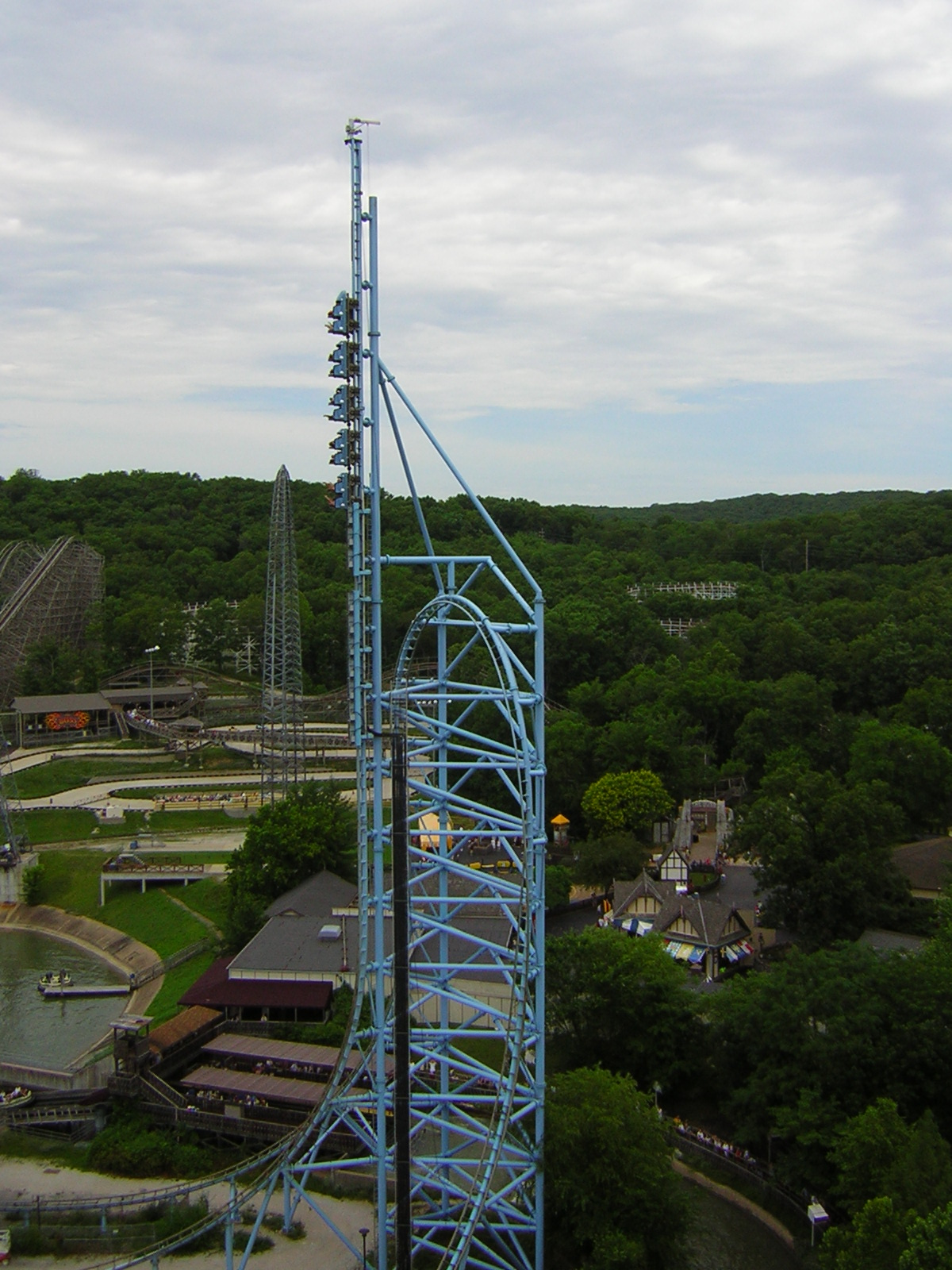
Mr. Freeze, a Premier Rides roller coaster.

Premier Rides is an amusement ride manufacturer based in the United States. The company was the first to use Linear Induction Motors (LIMs) on their roller coasters. Jim Seay has been the sole owner and company president since 1996.

The first roller coaster by Premier Rides was Runaway Mountain at Six Flags Over Texas, which opened on June 12, 1996.

== List of roller coasters ==
As of 2025, Premier Rides has built 40 roller coasters around the world. Premier Rides was also the broker involved with the High Roller steel roller coaster at the Stratosphere in Las Vegas. However, the ride was manufactured by S&MC.

Name	Model	Location	Country	Opened	Status	Ref
Runaway Mountain	Steel Coaster	Six Flags Over Texas	United States	1996	Operating	
Flight of Fear; Formerly Outer Limits: Flight of Fear	LIM Coaster	Kings Dominion	United States	1996	Operating	
Flight of Fear; Formerly Outer Limits: Flight of Fear	LIM Coaster	Kings Island	United States	1996	Operating	
Mr. Freeze; Formerly Mr. Freeze: Reverse Blast	LIM Coaster	Six Flags Over Texas	United States	1998	Operating	
Mr. Freeze: Reverse Blast; Formerly Mr. Freeze	LIM Coaster	Mid America Adventure	United States	1998	Operating	
Powder Keg: A Blast into the Wilderness; Formerly BuzzSaw Falls	Liquid Coaster	Silver Dollar City	United States	1999	Modified by S&S Worldwide	
Joker's Jinx	LIM Coaster	Six Flags America	United States	1999	SBNO	
Poltergeist	LIM Coaster	Six Flags Fiesta Texas	United States	1999	Operating	
Vonkaputous	Liquid Coaster	Linnanmäki	Finland	2001	Removed	
Revenge of the Mummy	LIM Coaster	Universal Studios Florida	United States	2004	Operating	
Revenge of the Mummy the Ride	LIM Coaster	Universal Studios Hollywood	United States	2004	Operating	
Back Lot Stunt Coaster; Formerly Italian Job: Stunt Track	LIM Coaster	Canada's Wonderland	Canada	2005	Operating	
Queen City Stunt Coaster; Formerly Italian Job: Stunt Track	LIM Coaster	Kings Island	United States	2005	Operating	
Back Lot Stunt Coaster; Formerly Italian Job Turbo Coaster	LIM Coaster	Kings Dominion	United States	2006	Operating	
Crazy Cobra; Formerly Mad Cobra	LIM Coaster	Discoveryland; Suzuka Circuit	China	2006; 1998 to 2003	Operating	
Revenge of the Mummy	LIM Coaster	Universal Studios Singapore	Singapore	2010	Operating	
Sky Rocket	Sky Rocket I	Kennywood	United States	2010	Operating	
Yamaha Racing Coaster	LSM Coaster	Trans Studio Indoor Theme Park Bandung inside the Transmart Bandung Supermall	Indonesia	2011	Operating	
Superman: Ultimate Flight	Sky Rocket II	Six Flags Discovery Kingdom	United States	2012	Operating	
Unknown; Formerly Speed – The Ride	LIM Coaster	Akita Plaza; Sahara Hotel and Casino	United States	2012; 2000 to 2011	In storage	
Unknown; Formerly Batman & Robin: The Chiller	Dueling LIM Coaster	Beto Carrero World; Six Flags Great Adventure	Brazil	2012; 1998 to 2007	Removed	
Deep Space	LSM Coaster	Adlabs Imagica	India	2013	Operating	
Full Throttle	Sky Rocket III	Six Flags Magic Mountain	United States	2013	Operating	
Sky Scream	Sky Rocket II	Holiday Park	Germany	2014	Operating	
Tempesto	Sky Rocket II	Busch Gardens Williamsburg	United States	2015	Operating	
Phobia Phear Coaster	Sky Rocket II	Lake Compounce	United States	2016	Operating	
Highway Boat; Formerly Soak'd; Formerly Slippery When Wet	HydroFighter Coaster	Sun World Danang Wonders; Freestyle Music Park; Hard Rock Park	Vietnam	2017; 2009; 2008	Removed	
Paradise Fall; Formerly Round About; Formerly Maximum RPM!	Revolver Coaster	Sun World Danang Wonders; Freestyle Music Park; Hard Rock Park	Vietnam	2017; 2009; 2008	Removed	
Hype	Sky Rocket II	Särkänniemi Amusement Park	Finland	2017	Operating	
Sky Rocket	Sky Rocket II	Chimelong Paradise	China	2017	Operating	
Electric Eel	Sky Rocket II	SeaWorld San Diego	United States	2018	Operating	
Tigris	Sky Rocket II	Busch Gardens Tampa	United States	2019	Operating	
West Coast Racers	Dueling Launch Coaster	Six Flags Magic Mountain	United States	2020	Operating	
EpiQ Coaster	LSM Coaster	Doha Quest	Qatar	2021	Operating	
Ice Breaker	Sky Rocket	SeaWorld Orlando	United States	2022	Operating	
Sky Loop	Sky Rocket II	Boulevard World; Riyadh Winter Wonderland	Saudi Arabia	2022; 2022	Operating	
Drakko: The Flying Beast; Formerly Zombie Ride	Sky Rocket II	Salitre Mágico; Bosque Mágico	Colombia	2023; 2015 to 2022	Operating	
Unknown	Sky Rocket II	Steel Pier	United States	2024	Under construction	
AlpenFury	Sky Rocket	Canada's Wonderland	Canada	2025	Operating	
