= Deep Space (roller coaster) =

Roller coaster

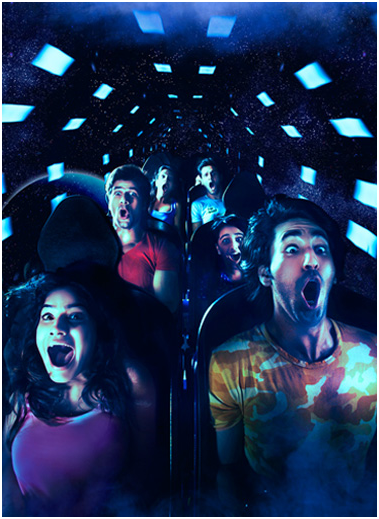

Adlabs Imagica
- Location: Adlabs Imagica
- Park section: Asiana
- Coordinates: 18.764727°N 73.280533°W
- Status: Operating
- Opening date: 2013

General statistics
- Type: Steel – Launched
- Manufacturer: Premier Rides
- Model: Sky Rocket - Indoor
- Lift/launch system: LSM launch circuit coaster
- Height: 57.41 ft (17.50 m)
- Length: 1,706 ft (520 m)
- Speed: 42.50 mph (68.40 km/h)
- Inversions: 2
- Duration: 1:56
- Capacity: 600 riders per hour
- Trains: 2 trains with 2 cars. Riders are arranged 6 across in a single row for a total of 12 riders per train.
- Height restriction: 52 in (132 cm) with adult; 54 in (137 cm) to ride alone
- Deep Space at RCDB

Deep Space is a coaster ride at the Adlabs Imagica amusement park located in Khopoli, Maharashtra, India. Manufactured by Premier rides, the ride reaches a maximum height of 57 feet (17.5 m) and a maximum speed of 42.50 miles per hour (68.4 km/h). The coaster also features 2 inversions.

== History ==
The dark indoor coaster was launched by Varun Dhawan with a mysterious Astronaut.

== Characteristics ==
=== Track ===
Designed by Premier Rides, the steel rail roller coaster of Deep Space is approximately 1706 feet (520 m) long and 57 feet (17.5 m) high. The track is painted black with grey rails and black supports.

=== Trains ===
Deep Space operates with two steel and fiberglass trains. Each train has two cars with 3 rows that can seat two riders in a single row, for a total of 12 riders per train.

== Reception ==
Neha Borkar from the Indiatimes said,"This one turned out to be the most surprising ride as we did the swiftest time travel in the space. Stick your neck tightly to the seat, as the speed here is neck breaking."
