= Scream Machine (Adlabs Imagica) =

Scream Machine Adlabs Imagica
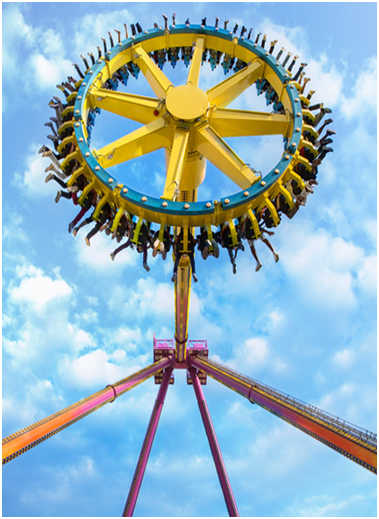
- Scream Machine at Adlabs Imagica

Adlabs Imagica
- Status: Operating

Ride statistics
- Attraction type: Frisbee
- Manufacturer: Zamperla
- Model: Giant Discovery
- Height: 146.92 ft (44.78 m)
- Vehicle type: Rotating Swivel
- Riders per vehicle: 40
- Duration: 4:03
- Height restriction: 52 in (132 cm)
- Lift/launch system: Chain lift hill
- Direction of rotation: Centre: Clockwise/Anticlockwise Swivel: Clockwise/Anticlockwise
- Speed: Centre: 10.5 rpm Swivel: 6 rpm
- max tangential gondola speed: 28.6 m/s
- max revolving speed of the gondola: 8 rpm
- Restraints: over the shoulder
- Website: http://www.adlabsimagica.com

Scream Machine is a Rotating Swivel at the Adlabs Imagica amusement park located in Khopoli, Mumbai, India. Manufactured by Zamperla s.p.a., motorised rotation of the swing system takes place at max tangential and revolving speed of 28.6 m/s and 8 rpm respectively. It rises to steep angles of 120 degrees and achieves a height of 148 feet above ground level.

== Characteristics ==
This ride operates on a rotating pendulum which first gathers momentum by spinning, and then slowly starts to swing. This machine rotates and goes up at an angle of 70 degrees and climbs to a height of 142 ft.

== Ride ==
The ride is a kind of motorized swing with a rotating swivel joint. The swivel is made of an octagon shaped rotation centre with 8 arms that are flanged to it. Between the 8 arms there are 8 groups of seats, and each group of seats contains 5 seats, for a total of 40 places. Each passenger is seated in his own seat and a safety bar restrain his shoulders and chest area.
