= Electric eel (disambiguation) =

An electric eel is a freshwater fish of the genus Electrophorus, able to generate powerful electric shocks.

The term may also refer to:

- Electric Eel (roller coaster), a roller coaster at SeaWorld San Diego
- electric eels, a punk rock band from Cleveland, Ohio active between 1972 and 1975
- Ampaire Electric EEL, a hybrid electric aircraft
- Electric Eel Shock, a Japanese, garage metal band, active since the late 1990s
