= Electric Eel (roller coaster) =

Steel roller coaster at SeaWorld San Diego

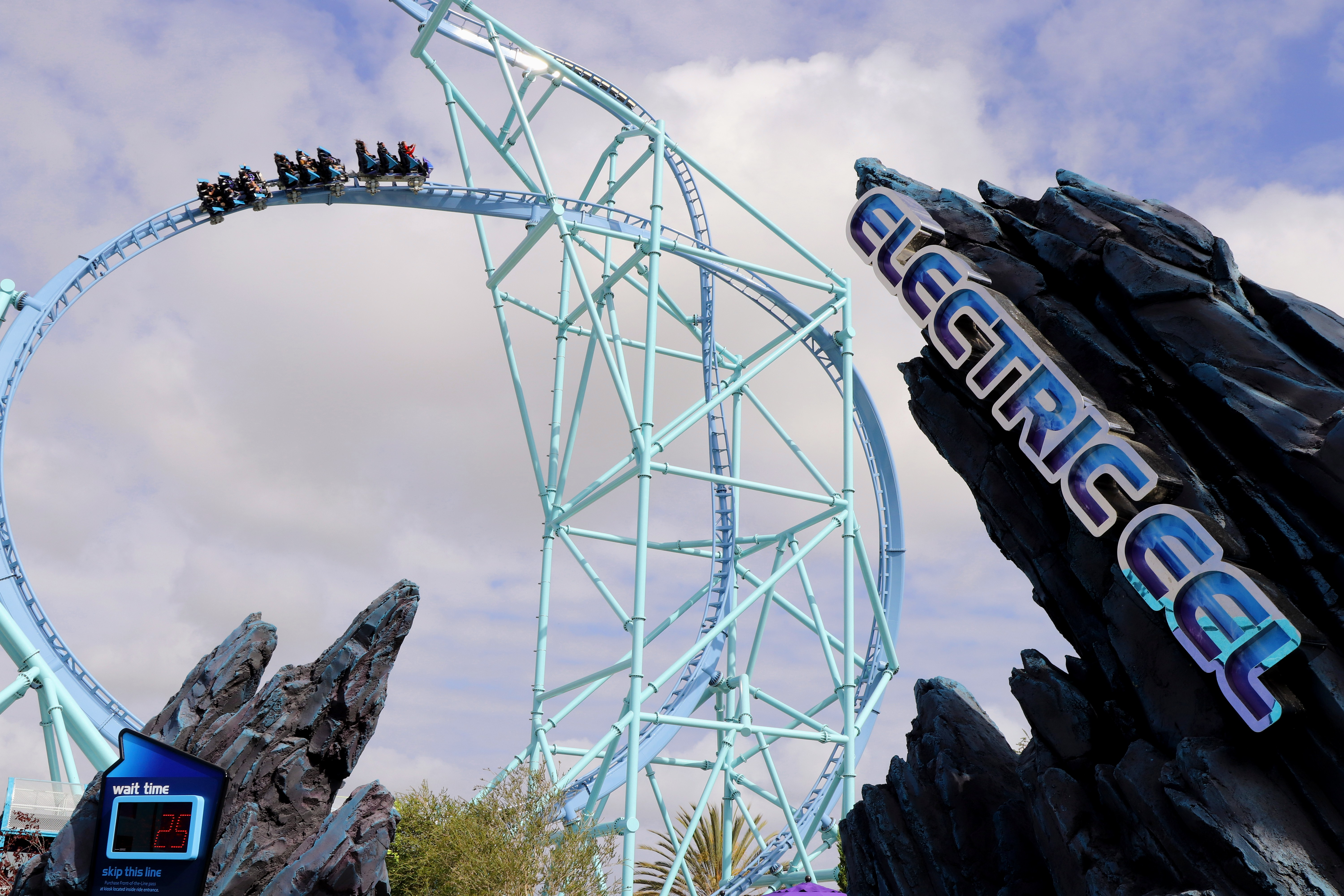

SeaWorld San Diego
- Location: SeaWorld San Diego
- Coordinates: 32.764990°N 117.224022°W
- Status: Operating
- Opening date: May 10, 2018

General statistics
- Type: Steel – Launched
- Manufacturer: Premier Rides
- Designer: PGAV Destinations
- Model: Sky Rocket II
- Lift/launch system: LSM Launch
- Height: 150 ft (46 m)
- Drop: 135 ft (41 m)
- Length: 863 ft (263 m)
- Speed: 62 mph (100 km/h)
- Inversions: 1
- Duration: 0:45
- Capacity: 720 riders per hour
- Height restriction: 54 in (137 cm)
- Trains: Single train with 3 cars; riders arranged 2 across in 3 rows for a total of 18 riders per train
- Website: Official site
- Quick Queue available
- Single rider line available
- Electric Eel at RCDB

Electric Eel is a steel launched roller coaster at SeaWorld in San Diego, California. The coaster opened in 2018 as the park's then-tallest and fastest, until the opening of Emperor in 2022. The ride is loosely themed around the electric eel (Electrophorus electricus). An educational area and informational exhibit on electric eels can also be found by the attraction and near the queue.

== History ==
On January 3, 2017, SeaWorld San Diego announced their intention to add the Electric Eel roller coaster in time for the summer 2018 season. The attraction would be a launched coaster by Maryland-based firm Premier Rides and, alongside three new attractions opening later that year, would mark a 24-month period of the park's largest expansion since their opening in 1964. Electric Eel was first proposed in January 2017 to be located on the park's eastern side, adjacent to the existing Journey to Atlantis water coaster, and, given its 150-foot height, would be painted lighter colors from the 60-foot mark and above in order to comply with city transparency requirements.

Work began later that year, and crews installed more than 200 6-foot (1.8 m) diameter columns, up to 40’ below ground, in order to support the ride's 11,000-square-foot foundation mat, which was completed by November 2017. Vertical construction began shortly after, and wrapped up on January 17, 2018. During a media tour on the same date, to commemorate the construction wrap-up, the ride's trains were first unveiled. On March 29, 2018, amid the ride's test runs, SeaWorld officials set Electric Eel's opening date for May 12, 2018. However, on April 17, the date was changed to two days earlier than originally planned, to May 10, while park representatives cited the project to be well-ahead of schedule. As announced, Electric Eel officially opened to the public on May 10, 2018.

== Ride experience ==
=== Queue ===
The queue area meanders around an ocean floor-themed landscape (despite electric eels actually being a freshwater, Amazonian species) located in front of the coaster, near the Ocean Explorer part of the park. The usage of handrails and permanent shade structures is minimal, and educational signage spread throughout the queue offer facts about electric eels. The queue also features an original musical score by composer Rick McKee.

=== Layout ===
Riders are launched forwards out of the station and up into a partial twist. The train then falls back through the station, where it is accelerated backwards into another twist. Once again, the train rolls back into the station and riders are accelerated for the third and final time to a top speed of 62 miles per hour (100 km/h). It then travels up to a height of 150 feet (46 m) and twists into a slow heartline roll at the top. Upon exiting the roll, riders twist down into a full non-inverting loop before coming to an eventual stop in the station. One full cycle of the ride experience lasts approximately 50 seconds. The coaster also features a high-energy soundtrack by Rick McKee (matching the movements of the coaster) for riders on the boarding platform.

== Characteristics ==
=== Statistics ===
Electric Eel is 150 feet (46 m) tall, 863 feet (263 m) long, and reaches an advertised top speed of 62 mph (100 km/h). The ride operates with a single 3 car train, with each car holding 6 riders in 3 rows of 2 for a total of 18 riders per train. Combined with steady operations, the advertised capacity is 720 riders per hour. The attraction sits on 1.2 acres of land, and the station occupies an area of 1,130 square feet.

=== Model ===
Electric Eel is a Sky Rocket II model coaster from Premier Rides. The compact launched coaster model is one of three bought by the United Parks & Resorts group, and the second one to be installed. The other two are Tempesto (2015) at Busch Gardens Williamsburg in James City County, Virginia, and Tigris (2019) at Busch Gardens Tampa Bay in Tampa, Florida. The attraction has also been cloned elsewhere, with the original being Superman: Ultimate Flight (2012) at Six Flags Discovery Kingdom in Vallejo, California, although unlike many of the other units installed the SeaWorld coasters operate with a longer train, increasing capacity by 50%. The train originally featured additional over the shoulder restraint system, although it was seen as largely performative rather than as a secondary mechanism and was permanently removed in early 2026.

=== Contractors ===
A large number of firms were involved in the design and construction process of Electric Eel, with credits being handed out to the following:

- Ride Manufacturer: Premier Rides
- General Contractor: Rudolph and Sletten Inc.
- Subcontractor: Cemrock Landscapes Inc.
- Lead Design Firm/Architect: PGAV Destinations
- Structural Engineer: EDM Inc.
- Geotechnical Engineer: Hayward Baker
- MEP Engineer: EXP Inc.
- Engineering Consultants; Christian Wheeler Engineering
- Rick McKee: Original Musical Score
