= Turnpike (ride) =

Former amusement ride at Kennywood

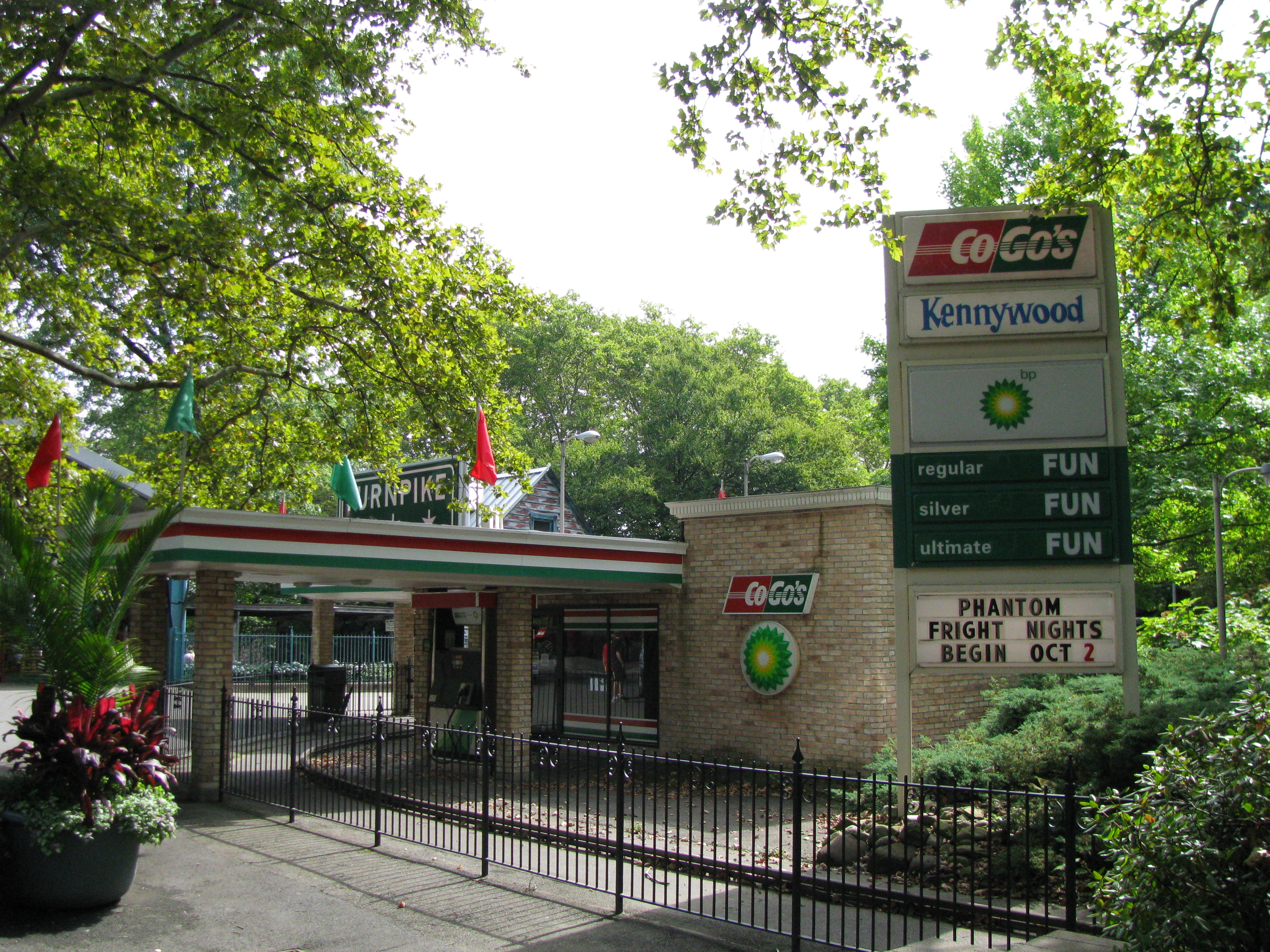

Kennywood
- Opening date: Spring 1966
- Closing date: 2010
- Replaced by: Sky Rocket

Turnpike was a ride at Kennywood amusement park in West Mifflin, Pennsylvania. It was introduced for the 1966 season. Turnpike originally had gasoline-powered cars, which were later replaced with electric cars.

Kennywood dismantled Turnpike in 2010 in order to make room for the new Sky Rocket launched steel roller coaster. The park stated that the ride would return in the future in a different location, but as of 2025, this has yet to occur.
