= Flight of Fear =

Enclosed launched roller coaster

- Previously known as The Outer Limits: Flight of Fear (1996-2001)
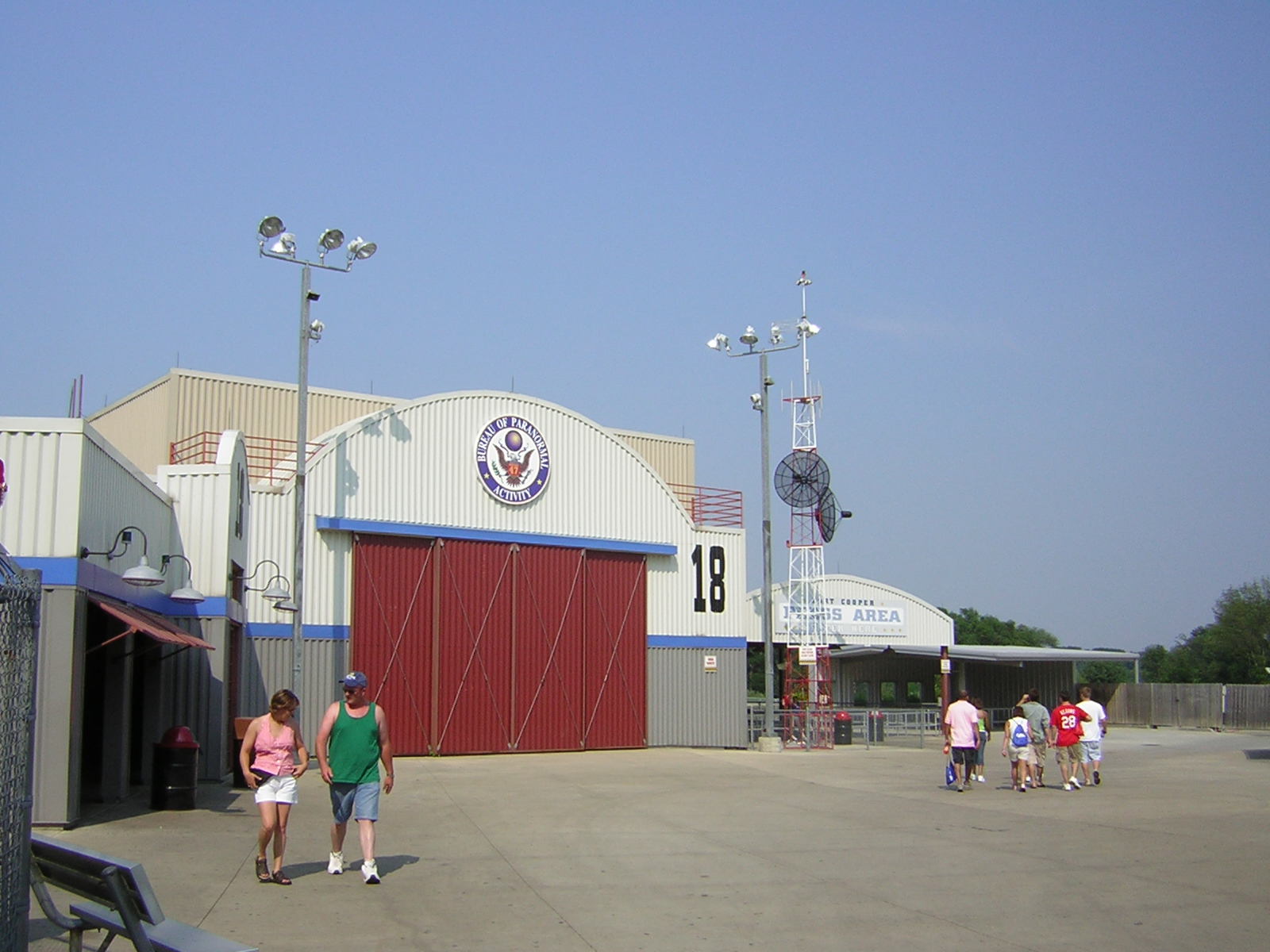
- Flight of Fear at Kings Island in 2005

Kings Island
- Park section: Area 72
- Coordinates: 39°20′34.58″N 84°15′48.79″W
- Status: Operating
- Soft opening date: June 17, 1996
- Opening date: June 18, 1996
- Cost: $11.2 million

Kings Dominion
- Park section: Jungle X-Pedition
- Coordinates: 37°50′20.34″N 77°26′21.30″W
- Status: Operating
- Soft opening date: June 17, 1996
- Opening date: June 18, 1996
- Cost: $11.2 million
- Flight of Fear at Kings Dominion at RCDB

General statistics
- Type: Steel – Launched – Enclosed
- Manufacturer: Premier Rides
- Designer: Werner Stengel
- Model: LIM Catapult
- Lift/launch system: LIM Launch
- Height: 74.2 ft (22.6 m)
- Length: 2,705 ft (824 m)
- Speed: 54 mph (87 km/h)
- Inversions: 4
- Duration: 1:00
- Capacity: 2000 riders per hour
- Acceleration: 0 to 54 mph (0 to 87 km/h) in 4 seconds
- G-force: 4.5
- Height restriction: 54 in (137 cm)
- Trains: 4 trains with 5 cars; riders arranged 2 across in 2 rows for a total of 20 riders per train
- Restraint: Lap bar
- Fast Lane available at both parks
- Flight of Fear at RCDB

Flight of Fear is the name of two identical enclosed roller coasters located at Kings Island in Mason, Ohio, and at Kings Dominion in Doswell, Virginia, United States. Built and designed by Premier Rides, both opened as The Outer Limits: Flight of Fear on June 18, 1996, themed after The Outer Limits TV series that began airing in 1995 as a revival of the original 1960s series.

Both installations were the world's first launched roller coasters to feature linear induction motor (LIM) technology. Following Cedar Fair's purchase of Paramount Parks in 2006, all references to The Outer Limits were eventually removed from the ride as Cedar Fair began purging Paramount licensing and themes from their parks.

== History ==
Following Paramount's purchase of Kings Island and sister parks in 1992, an idea for a new indoor attraction was first pitched in 1994. The ride would incorporate a Star Trek: Deep Space Nine theme that focused the ride's backstory on Quark, a character in the TV series that owned a bar. He created a travel company attraction called "Quark Adventures", where guests were given the opportunity to tour the ship and travel through a wormhole, which proved to be unstable. The show's underperformance led to Paramount scrapping the amusement park project, although they would later build a Star Trek attraction in Las Vegas called Star Trek: The Experience, which opened in 1998.

In August 1995, both Kings Island and Kings Dominion began teasing a new attraction for the 1996 season. Kings Dominion cut a crop circle in a nearby field that depicted a UFO, the face of an alien, and the letter "F" written in binary. A few days later, Kings Island revealed their new attraction as an indoor roller coaster named "The Outer Limits: Flight of Fear". Reaching a top speed of 54 mph (87 km/h) in only four seconds, it was originally described as utilizing a "laser-controlled catapult system" that would propel riders through a series of inversions in the dark. The experience would be "heightened by Hollywood-type special effects", according to Carolyn Boof, the park's manager of marketing communications. Boof also confirmed it would cost significantly more than the $7 million that was cited in earlier reports, and that its alien theme would be based on the 1960s science-fiction TV series, The Outer Limits.

At Kings Island, construction on the indoor coaster began on the back side of The Racer in Coney Mall. The new ride would sit on some of the land formerly occupied by the Wild Animal Habitat. The rest of the former spot was eventually used for other new attractions, including Son of Beast, Xtreme Skyflyer, and Thunder Alley. At Kings Dominion, an identical installation was built in the Congo section on the east side of the park next to Anaconda and the recently vacant Lost World mountain, occupying the former Wild Animal Safari area. More details were released in January 1996 at the 16th annual Non Coaster-thon Coaster Conference in Chicago.

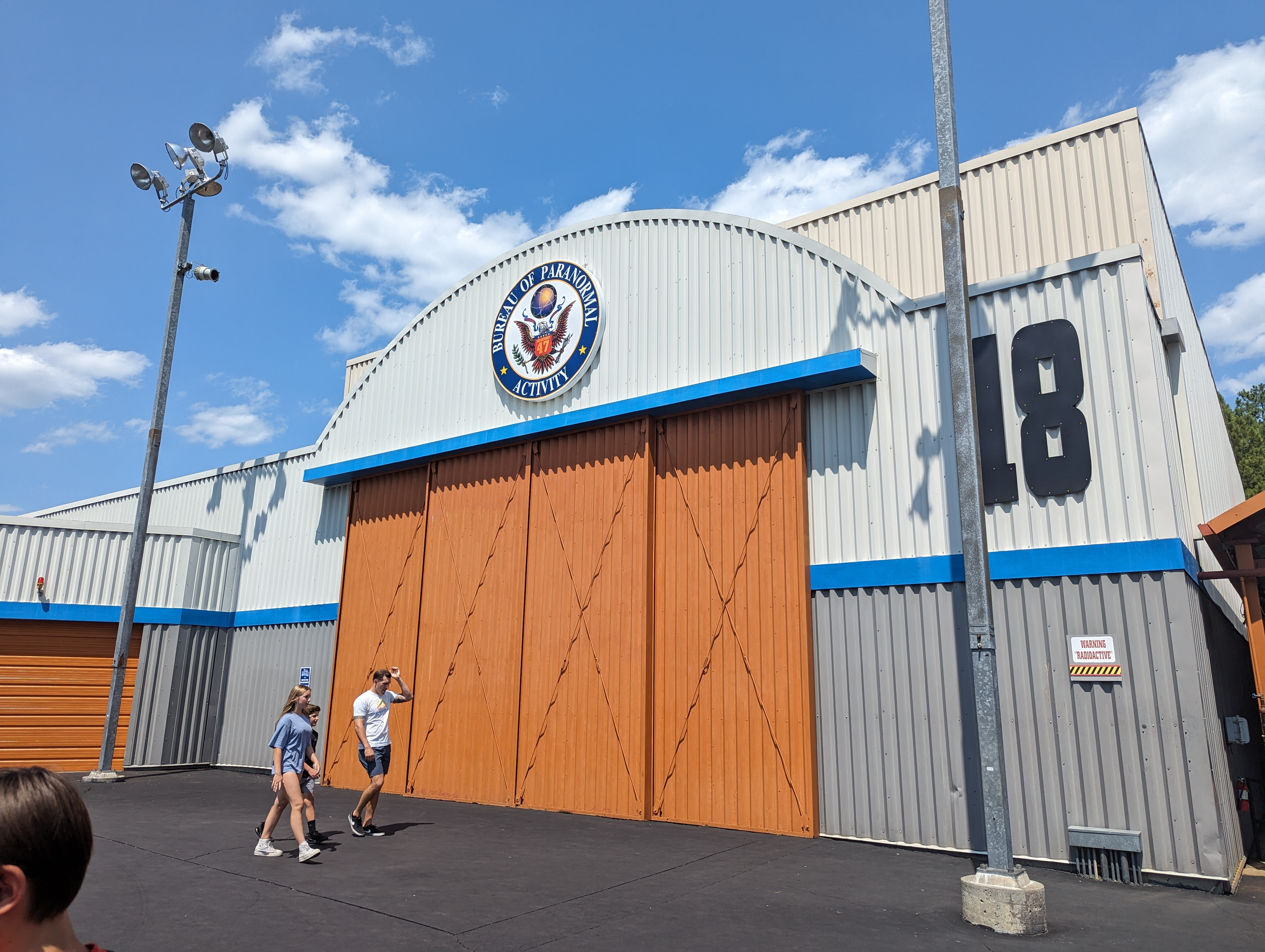
Flight of Fear at Kings Dominion in 2023

Premier Rides and park engineers performed the first successful launch at the Kings Dominion location on the evening of April 11, 1996, proving that linear induction motors could produce enough force through the use of magnetic fields to quickly accelerate roller coasters. Each launch required 3 megawatts of electric power, which caused frequent voltage sags to neighboring utility customers. Square D by Schneider Electric was hired to develop a complex solid-state capacitor bank which solved the sagging issue by reducing the load on the local electric utilities.

Flight of Fear was originally scheduled to open in April 1996, but it was later delayed until June. Both park installations opened to the public on June 18, 1996, setting a world record among roller coasters for fastest acceleration. A media preview event was held the previous day. The attraction was awarded several top honors at the 1995 International Association of Amusement Parks and Attractions trade show.

Paramount Parks filed a lawsuit against Premier Rides in September 1996 regarding cost overruns during development and construction. Premier spokeswoman Courtney Simmons said in November 1997 that the absence of LIM technology in the original plans was a factor, and that the suit was essentially about money. It was later settled, and Premier expected to continue working with Paramount in future endeavors. After a lease agreement that allowed Paramount to license the sci-fi TV series expired, The Outer Limits was dropped from the name in 2001 at both locations.

The Kings Island installation was constructed in a small subsection of Coney Mall. After the addition of Firehawk in 2007, the area was named X-Base, themed to space and the paranormal. Flight of Fear was one of the two attractions that made their Winterfest debut in 2018, with the other one being Shake, Rattle & Roll, the park's Troika flat ride. The ride was dubbed as Flight of Cheer and featured Christmas decorations. Following Kings Island's August 2019 announcement of Orion, a new roller coaster replacing Firehawk, it was revealed that X-Base would be overhauled and renamed Area 72. For the 2020 season, Flight of Fear's entrance at Kings Island was updated with an extended outdoor line queue, which provides guests with view of Orion. A security van, a meteor and a fence were placed in front of the building. The exit area was improved with a new photo booth.

== Characteristics ==
Flight of Fear uses linear induction motor technology instead of a traditional chain lift hill. This system utilizes fins on both sides of the ride vehicles. These fins pass through a gap in the magnets, creating a current and propelling forward. Alternating current (AC) is applied to the magnets to create a magnetic field.

The launch track features 44 LIM motors to launch the train. Flight of Fear includes four inversions which are a Batwing (a cobra roll like element), a Sidewinder, and a Flatspin. It also features 30 vertical curves and 25 compound horizontal turns. The ride weighs 1,000,000 pounds (450,000 kg) of steel, stretching over 2,705 feet (824 m) of track and sits on 1 acre (0.40 ha) of land. The main structure of the building is a completely enclosed air-conditioned octagon. This dark arena features multi-colored lights and a ceiling crane used for maintenance.

Premier Rides built other LIM Catapult models from 1996 to 1999, including Joker's Jinx at Six Flags America, Poltergeist at Six Flags Fiesta Texas, and Crazy Cobra at Discoveryland. The two Flight of Fear rides are the only indoor versions and share a similar layout with the same technical specifications. The LIM launch system used by Premier Rides would later be featured on Mr. Freeze at Six Flags St. Louis and Six Flags Over Texas, Batman & Robin: The Chiller at Six Flags Great Adventure, and Speed – The Ride at the Sahara Hotel and Casino.

== Ride experience ==
=== Queue and theming ===
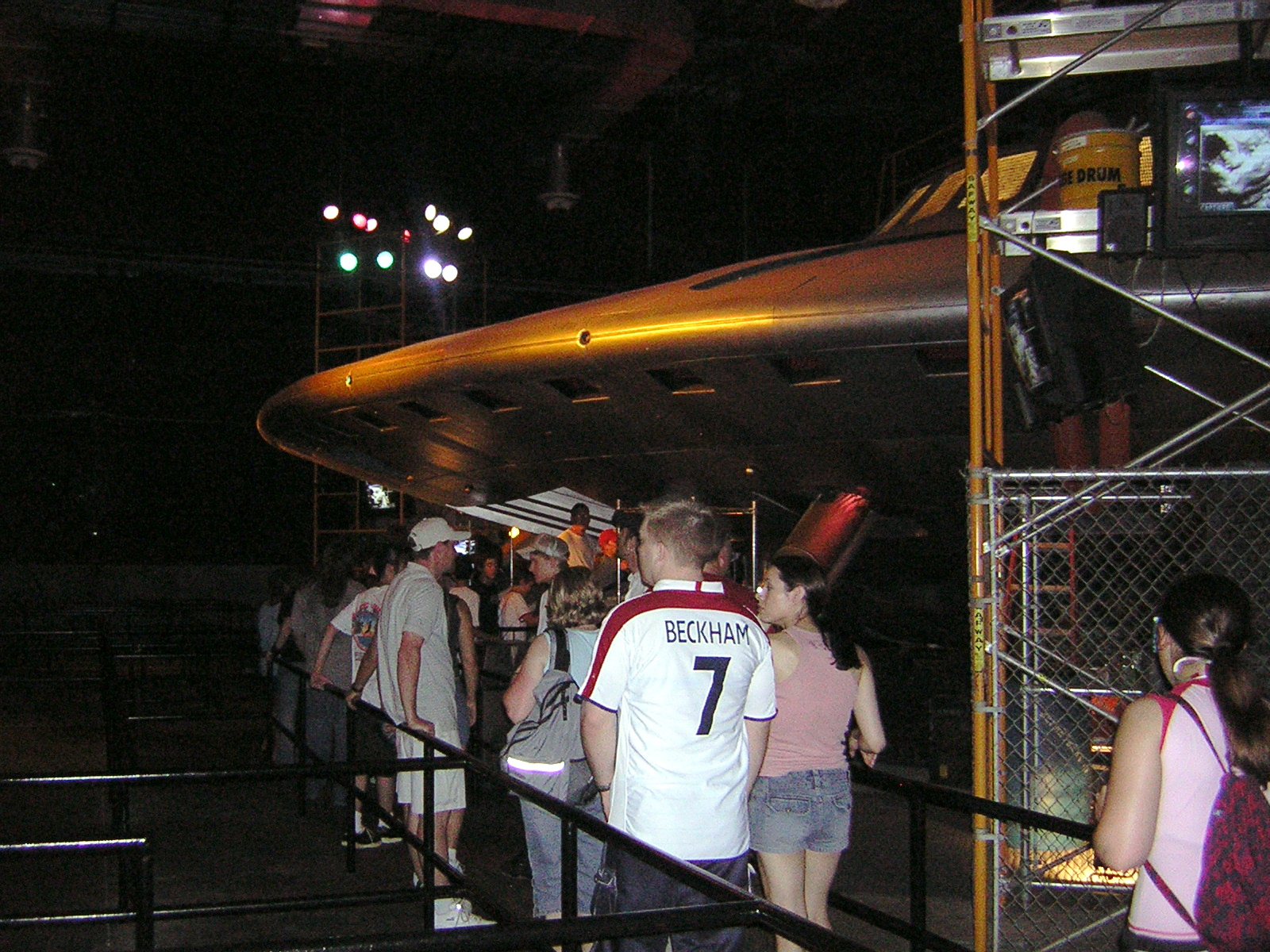
The original queue hangar at Kings Dominion

==== Kings Island ====
The building housing the queue is designed as an Area 51-inspired military installation hangar. The outside is marked with the number 18, and riders enter the line through a "press area" located under an awning to the side of the building. Various announcements regarding the operation of the base and broadcasts from WERD ("weird"), a fictitious radio station, are played over speakers in the outside queue area. The queue line slightly descends down a short, narrow tunnel as guests enter the building, making a left into the interior of the hangar. It contains one-half of a full-sized mockup UFO flying saucer, which appears to be complete as the back wall of the building is entirely lined with mirrors to complete the illusion. A video is played over multiple screens to describe the ride's backstory, explaining how the spacecraft crash-landed not far from the park. While some base personnel are running tests on the vessel, others are convinced that it's a hoax and decided to allow the press in to view it. Hazmat suits and computer equipment with active monitors can be seen in various locations inside the hangar.

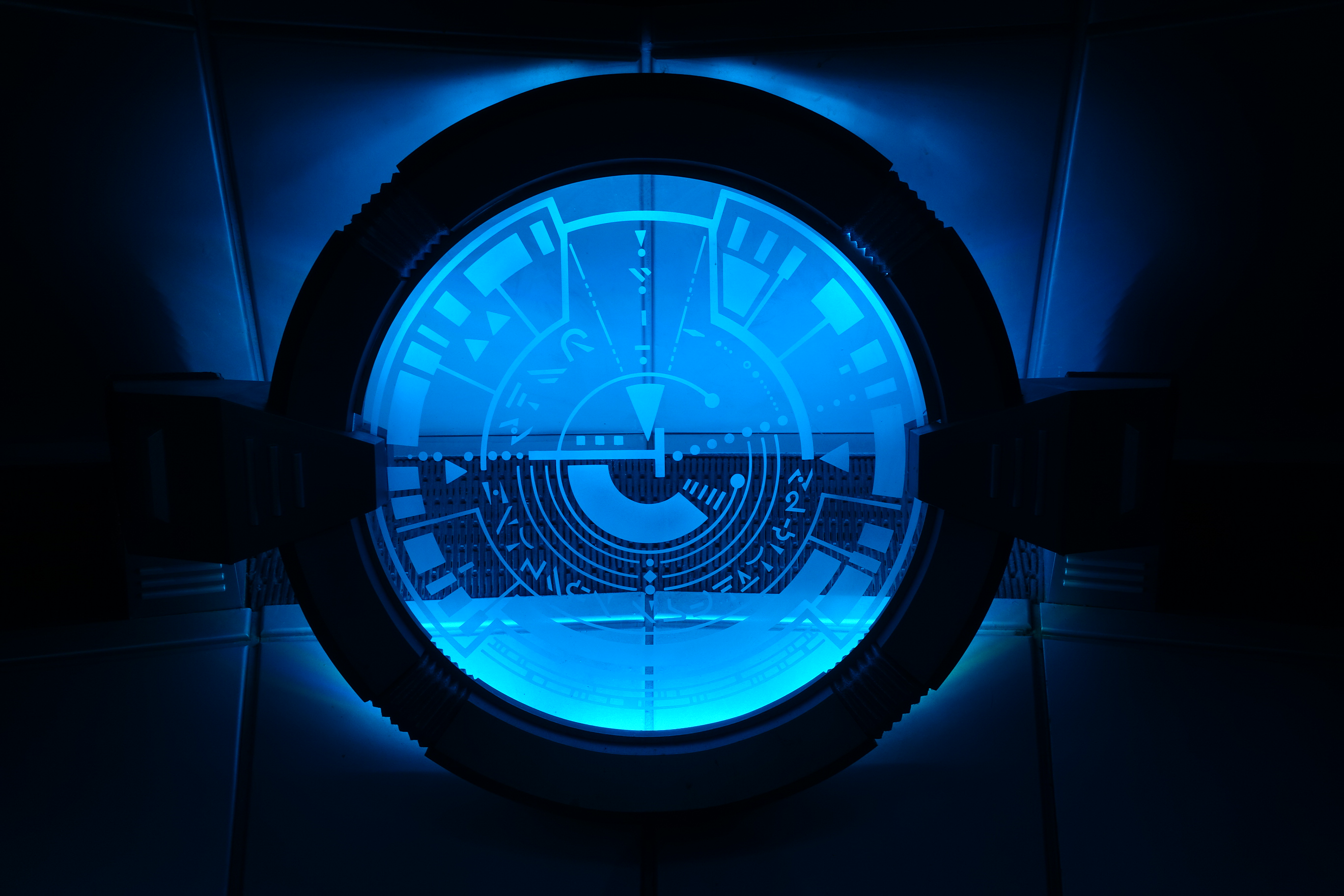
Theming inside the saucer

Strobe and dimming lighting effects are utilized throughout the indoor portion of the queue, which are synchronized with the pre-recorded video during moments of power surges and power failures. The line winds around the inside of the hangar before entering the underside of the UFO up a short flight of stairs.

The inside of the saucer features a display with alien markings and originally played various sound effects. Guests can hear each launch, which resonates throughout this portion of the queue. The walkway turns to the right, continues into another room, and turns left into the boarding area. The loading and unloading stations are in separate rooms, so riders in the loading area witness an empty train returning. The loading station features human-sized cryotube props containing mannequins wrapped in plastic, adding to the alien theme. While the train is loading and waiting to be dispatched, a sound effect imitating the warm-up of a jet engine can be heard, and another take-off sound is played as the train launches.

The ride was originally themed to The Outer Limits TV series. However, Paramount's licensing for the show expired in 2001, causing all references to The Outer Limits to be removed. The attraction features an original soundtrack composed by Rob Pottorf, and its theming was co-designed by Bob Dennis and David Ferguson of Paramount Parks Design & Entertainment.

==== Kings Dominion ====
From 1996 to 2024 the theming for Kings Dominion's version of Flight of Fear was the same as Kings Island's, in 2025, Flight of Fear was integrated into the Jungle X-Pedition area of the park with new colors supporting the Whey Foundation research.

=== Layout ===
Riders are launched from the station, accelerating from 0 to 54 mph (0 to 87 km/h) in four seconds down a 220-foot (67 m) launch tunnel. The Kings Island location has an on-ride camera that takes photos of the riders during the launch. The ride emerges into a "spaghetti bowl" of track inside of the 110-foot (34 m) tall ride building. Following the launch, the train immediately enters a Batwing (a element similar to a cobra roll), which contains two of the ride's four inversions. The ride layout continues with a sidewinder and multiple turns. After passing through the mid-course brake run, riders spiral downward to the left, continuing to maneuver through the twisted ride structure. The train picks up speed as riders dive at the floor of the building, finally passing through a Flatspin before arriving at the final brake run.

=== Trains ===
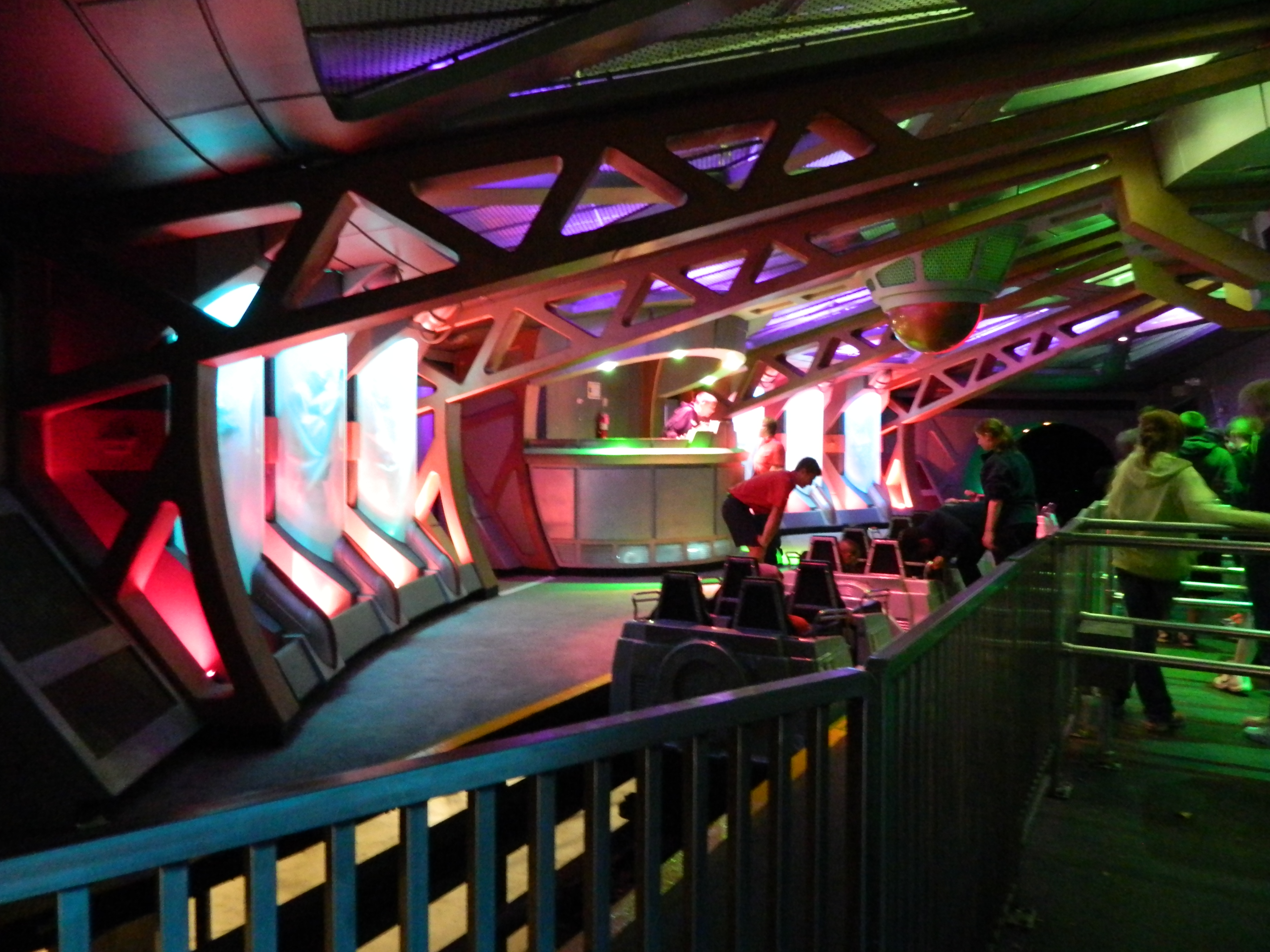
The station of Flight of Fear at Kings Island

The trains on the ride originally featured over-the-shoulder restraints, but these were changed to individual lap bar restraints in 2001 at both locations, along with the name change. Each train also originally featured six cars, but that was later reduced to five. Kings Dominion operates three trains, while Kings Island typically operates two trains despite owning four.

== Incidents ==
=== Kings Island ===
- At approximately 2:45 p.m. on June 2, 2014, emergency crews received a report of a fire at the ride. Smoke from an overheated electrical motor had filled the ride building. Two of the eighteen people exposed to the smoke were treated at the scene. Emergency crews cleared the building around 3:45 p.m.
- Smoke coming from a panel outside of the ride building was reported at 10:35 a.m. on June 14, 2014. The panel was the only part of the building to suffer damage; the ride was unaffected, with no flames or injuries reported. The ride later reopened around 12:15 p.m.

=== Kings Dominion ===
On March 26, 2025, 20 riders were trapped on the Flight of Fear roller coaster at Kings Dominion due to a malfunction during the ride's launch sequence. The roller coaster was temporarily halted as a precautionary measure. The riders were stranded for several hours before being safely evacuated by emergency responders. While the specific cause of the malfunction was related to the ride's launch system, no injuries were reported.

== Gallery ==
=== Kings Dominion ===
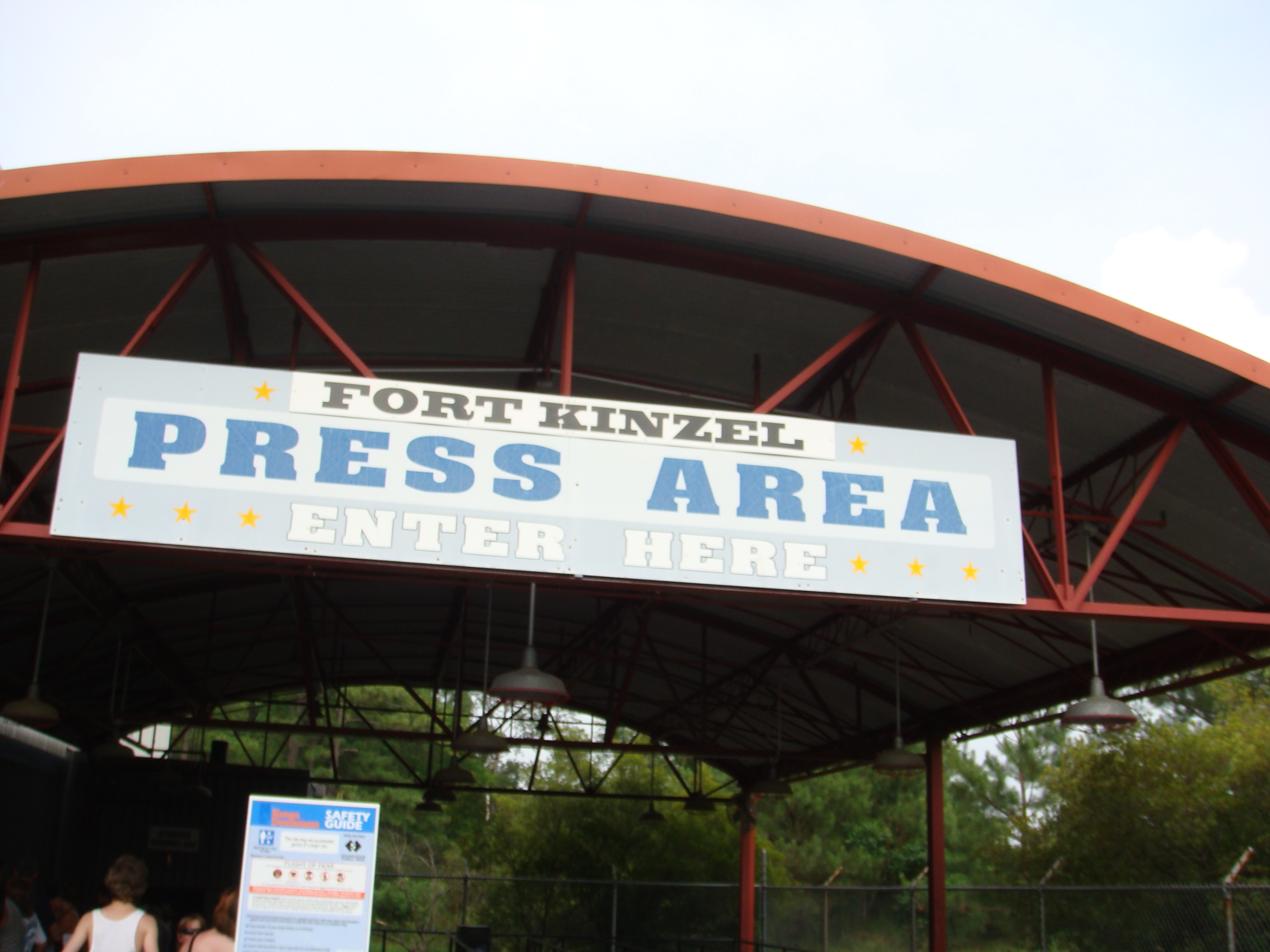
