= Poltergeist (roller coaster) =

Roller coaster at Six Flags Fiesta Texas

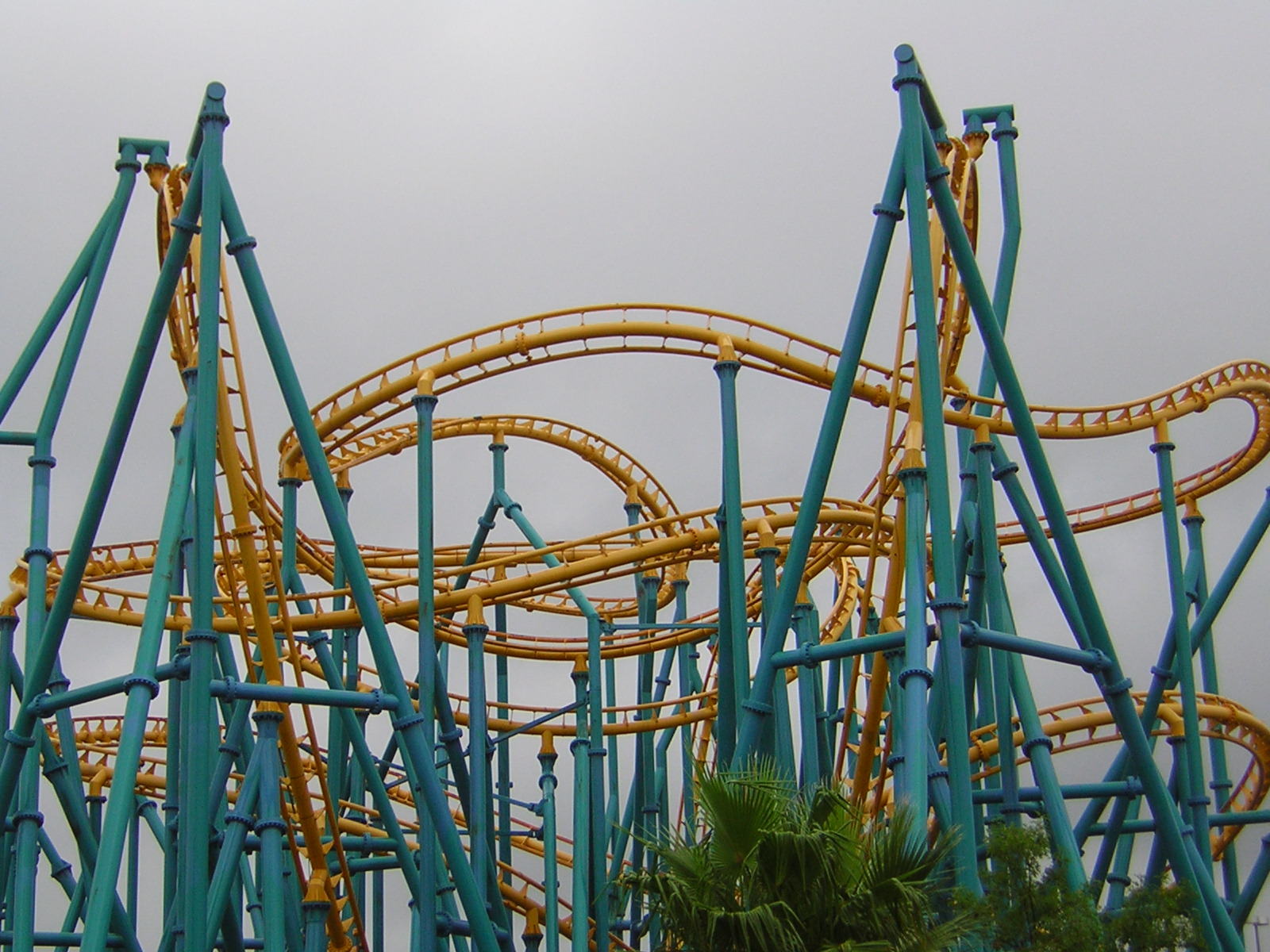
- View of the compact coaster layout

Six Flags Fiesta Texas
- Location: Six Flags Fiesta Texas
- Park section: Rockville
- Coordinates: 29°35′49″N 98°36′30″W
- Status: Operating
- Opening date: May 28, 1999
- Replaced: Seaside Golf

General statistics
- Type: Steel – Launched
- Manufacturer: Premier Rides
- Designer: Werner Stengel
- Model: LIM Coaster
- Lift/launch system: LIM Launch
- Height: 78.8 ft (24.0 m)
- Length: 2,705 ft (824 m)
- Speed: 60 mph (97 km/h)
- Inversions: 4
- Duration: 1:15
- Acceleration: 0 to 60 mph (0 to 97 km/h) in 3.5 seconds
- G-force: 4.5
- Height restriction: 54 in (137 cm)
- Trains: 2 trains with 6 cars. Riders are arranged 2 across in 2 rows for a total of 24 riders per train.
- Website: Official website
- Fast Lane available
- Poltergeist at RCDB

Poltergeist is a steel roller coaster located at Six Flags Fiesta Texas in San Antonio, Texas. Designed by Werner Stengel and manufactured by Premier Rides, the roller coaster opened to the public on May 28, 1999. Its track was fabricated by Dynamic Structures and Intermountain Lift, Inc.

== History ==
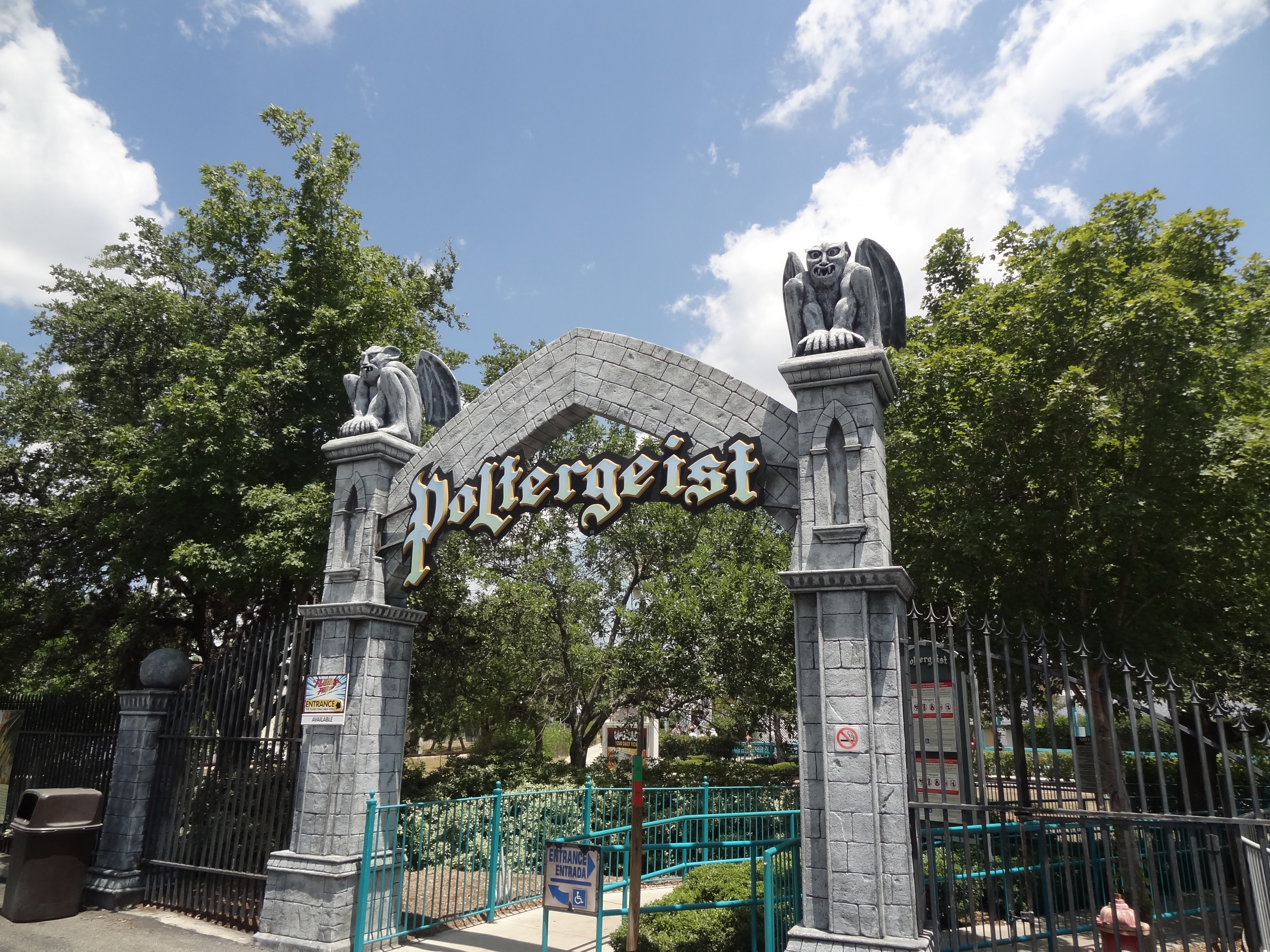
The original entrance archway.

On October 8, 1998, Six Flags Fiesta Texas announced a $30 million expansion on new rides. There would be three major rides set to open that year, which were Poltergeist, Boomerang and Scream. Poltergeist would be built by Premier Rides and be an LIM launch coaster. The ride would replace Seaside Golf, a miniature golf course that opened with the park in 1992.

Poltergeist officially opened on May 28, 1999.

The attraction closed temporarily in 2021 for refurbishment, which included a new color scheme, upgraded queue line, and repainted station. The track was repainted a light green, while the supports were repainted a darker green-gray. New elements were added to the queue, such as an archway, refreshed railings, garage scenery, a hedge maze, an expanded indoor queue area, planters and other themed structures. Moreover, a ghostly statue was added on top of the station. The trains were also repainted. Poltergeist reopened on September 3, 2021.

== Ride Layout ==
Poltergeist is located in the Rockville section of the park.

After boarding Poltergeist, riders are launched through a narrow launch tunnel into a "spaghetti bowl" of track which contains a cobra roll, a sidewinder, and many twists and turns. This coaster doesn't feature a mid-course brake run like other clones including Flight of Fear at Kings Island and Kings Dominion, or rings like the now-defunct Joker's Jinx at Six Flags America. After that riders spiral downward and to the left and after more twists and turns they pass through a corkscrew before arriving at the ride's final brake run.

Premier Rides built several of these LIM Catapult roller coasters from 1996 to 1999, although, of those, only the two Flight of Fear rides are indoors. The other outdoor LIM Catapult coaster in the United States was Joker's Jinx at Six Flags America; that opened in 1999 and closed in 2025. In addition, a LIM Catapult coaster called Mad Cobra operated at Suzuka Circuit in Japan from 1998 to 2003; Mad Cobra was moved to China and reopened at Discoveryland in 2006. The five Premier LIM catapult coasters share a similar layout and have the same technical specifications.

Poltergeist uses a LIM launching system instead of a traditional lift hill to propel riders into its first inversions. Initially, the ride had over-the-shoulder restraints, but due to numerous reports of pain and discomfort, these were replaced in 2002 with more traditional individual ratcheting lapbars.

== Ride Elements ==
- Cobra Roll
- Sidewinder
- Corkscrew

== Similar rides ==
Poltergeist opened in the same year as the now-defunct The Joker's Jinx at Six Flags America (1999), three years after the world's first LIM-launched coasters, Flight of Fear, opened at Kings Island (1996) and Kings Dominion (1996).

== In other media ==
Poltergeist is also featured in Barnes & Noble's Roller Coasters: A Thrill Seeker's Guide to the Ultimate Scream Machines.
