= Sky Rocket II =

Steel roller coaster model

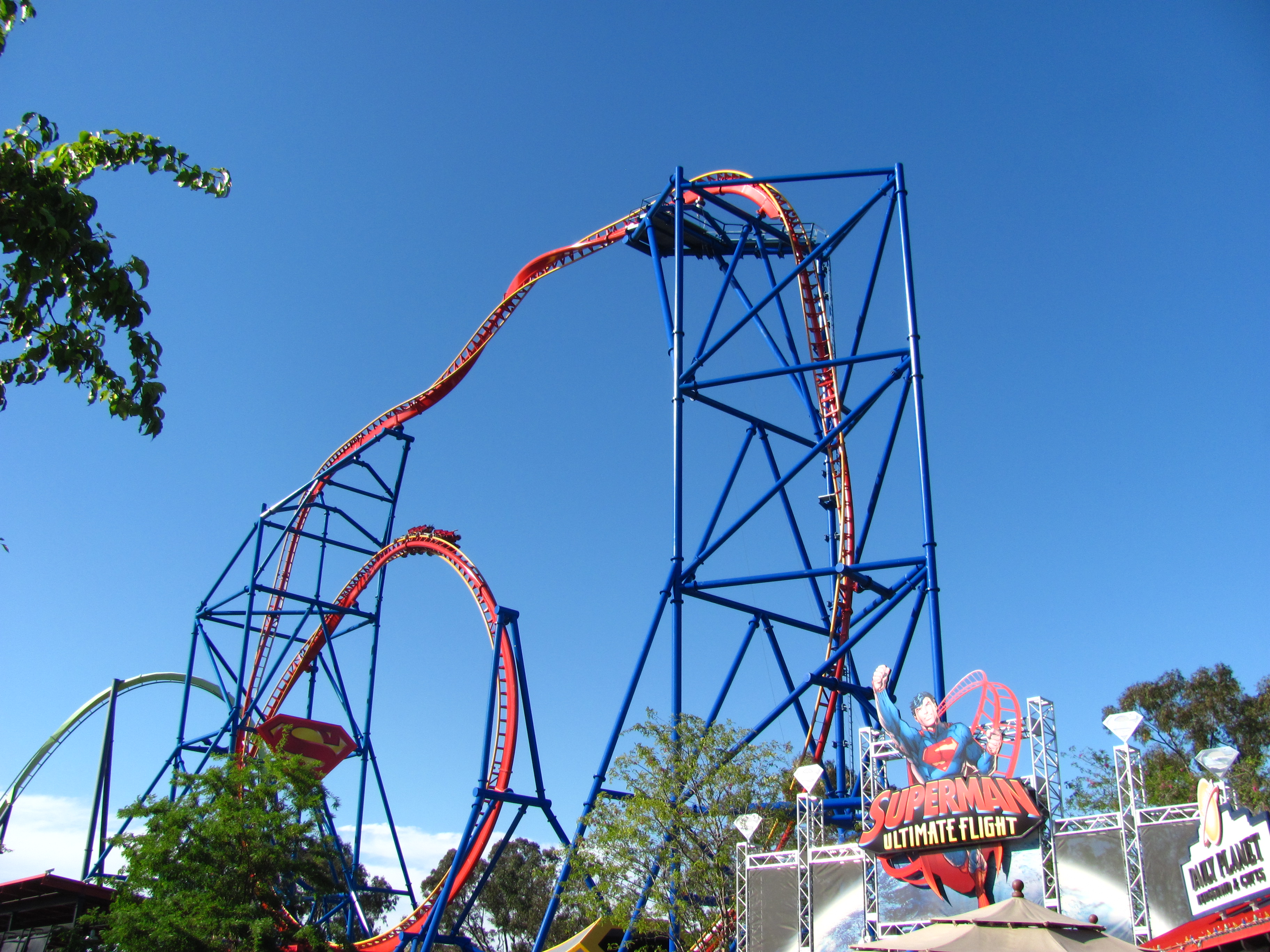
- The Sky Rocket II prototype, Superman: Ultimate Flight
- Status: In production
- First manufactured: 2012
- No. of installations: 10
- Manufacturer: Premier Rides
- Height: 150 ft (46 m)
- Length: 863 ft (263 m)
- Speed: 62 mph (100 km/h)
- Capacity: 500 riders per hour
- Riders per vehicle: 12-18
- Restraint Style: Lapbar, occasionally Comfort Collar
- Inversions: 1
- Sky Rocket II at RCDB

Sky Rocket II is a steel roller coaster model made by American manufacturer Premier Rides. The first Sky Rocket II was Superman: Ultimate Flight at Six Flags Discovery Kingdom, which opened on June 30, 2012, and the latest is Sky Loop at Riyadh Winter Wonderland in 2022. The ride model features a height of 150 feet (46 m), a length of 863 feet (263 m), a maximum speed of 62 miles per hour (100 km/h), and includes one inversion. The ride has been noted for its low-cost and small foot-print.

== History ==
The production for the Sky Rocket II model began in with its announcement in 2011 with the introduction of Superman: Ultimate Flight for Six Flags Discovery Kingdom. Originally for the prototype model, there would be two cars with two riders per row with three rows in total, though expandable for other consumers. The model for Six Flags opened on June 30, 2012. Tempesto at Busch Gardens Williamsburg introduced the model using three cars in 2015.

== Design ==
The 863-foot (263 m) track reaches a height of 150 feet (46 m), the trains are accelerated forward by linear synchronous motor (LSM) launch, but do not reach the maximum altitude and thus travel backwards through the station, continuing to accelerate, almost reaching the apex of the non-inverting loop. In the subsequent forward passage of the station, the trains are accelerated again and thereby reach the maximum height and speed of 62 miles per hour (100 km/h). It is followed by an inline twist, the exit of which leads to a downward dive, which initiates the passage of the non-inverting loop. In the station, the trains are then brought to a halt.

Drakko at Salitre Magico (former Zombie Ride at Bosque Mágico) is the currently the only Sky Rocket II coaster with a sliding loading platform allowing two train operations. One train is slid into the circuit while the other train is loading at the platform. As Zombie Ride it was also the only Sky Rocket II to complete two full laps of the circuit which was not continued after moving the coaster to Colombia. Drakko still uses 12-passenger trains like Superman: Ultimate Flight.

== Installations ==
Premier Rides has built ten Sky Rocket II coasters. These are listed by order of opening.

Roller coaster	Park	Country	Opened	Status
Superman: Ultimate Flight	Six Flags Discovery Kingdom	United States	2012	Operating
Sky Scream	Plopsaland Deutschland	Germany	2014	Operating
Tempesto	Busch Gardens Williamsburg	United States	2015	Operating
Phobia Phear Coaster	Lake Compounce	United States	2016	Operating
Hype	Särkänniemi	Finland	2017	Operating
Sky Rocket	Chimelong Paradise	China	2017	Operating
Electric Eel	SeaWorld San Diego	United States	2018	Operating
Tigris	Busch Gardens Tampa	United States	2019	Operating
Sky Loop	Riyadh Winter Wonderland	Saudi Arabia	2022	Operating
Drakko: The Flying Beast; Formerly Zombie Ride	Salitre Mágico; Bosque Mágico	Colombia	2023; 2015 to 2022	Operating
Unknown	Steel Pier	United States	Unknown	Unknown
