= The Joker's Jinx =

Roller coaster at Six Flags America

- The Joker's Jinx in July 2001

Six Flags America
- Location: Six Flags America
- Park section: Gotham City
- Coordinates: 38.910°N 76.776°W
- Status: Closed
- Opening date: May 8, 1999
- Closing date: November 2, 2025
- Cost: $10 million

General statistics
- Type: Steel – Launched
- Manufacturer: Premier Rides
- Designer: Werner Stengel
- Model: LIM Coaster
- Lift/launch system: LIM launch
- Height: 78.8 ft (24.0 m)
- Length: 2,705 ft (824 m)
- Speed: 60 mph (97 km/h)
- Inversions: 4
- Duration: 0:56
- Capacity: 975 riders per hour
- Acceleration: 0 - 60 in 3 seconds
- G-force: 4.5
- Height restriction: 54 in (137 cm)
- Trains: 2 trains with 6 cars; riders arranged 2 across in 2 rows for a total of 24 riders per train
- Flash Pass was Available
- The Joker's Jinx at RCDB

The Joker's Jinx is a decommissioned steel roller coaster at Six Flags America in Prince George's County, Maryland. The ride utilizes linear induction motor technology to launch the train from 0 to 60 mph (97 km/h) in just over three seconds.

The Joker's Jinx was designed by Premier Rides and manufactured by Intermountain Lift, Inc.

== History ==
In the fall of 1998, pieces of green Premier Rides roller coaster track were spotted on the park's property. On October 28, 1998, it was announced that Adventure World would be renamed Six Flags America and feature three new roller coasters, including Joker's Jinx. Joker's Jinx would be an LIM spaghetti bowl launch coaster by Premier Rides. It was to be located in a brand new 6-acre (0.024 km^{2}) Gotham City section, which would be entered by passing under The Wild One roller coaster.

Construction of Joker's Jinx began in December 1998 and was completed in late March 1999. On April 4, 1999, the ride performed its first test runs. Joker's Jinx officially opened on May 8, 1999.

Joker's Jinx was repainted with a brighter green track in 2020.

On May 1, 2025, Six Flags announced that the Six Flags America park will close at the end of the 2025 season on November 2, 2025. The status on the future of the Joker's Jinx roller coaster was not given at the time of the announcement.

== Ride Layout ==
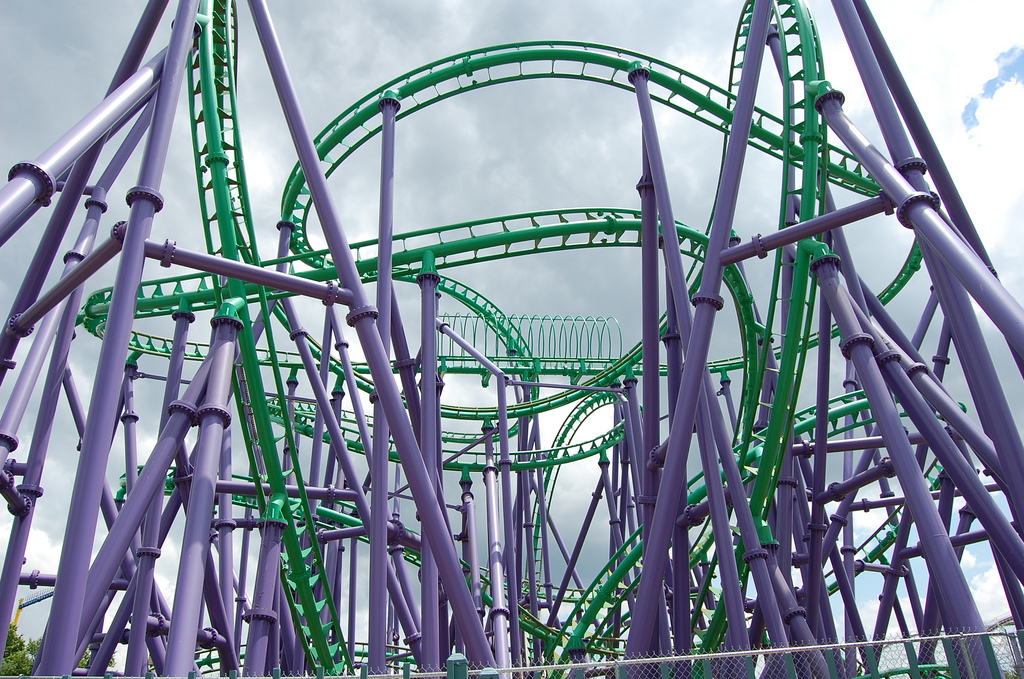
Joker's Jinx track layout

Joker's Jinx is located in the Gotham City section of the park near Superman: Ride of Steel roller coaster. After boarding Joker's Jinx, riders are launched through a narrow launch tunnel into a "spaghetti bowl" of track which contains a cobra roll, a sidewinder, and many twists and turns. The coaster doesn't have a mid-course brake run like the similar rides at Kings Island and Kings Dominion; instead the coaster has multiple rings that the train goes through. After the rings, riders spiral downward and to the left, and after more twists and turns they pass through a corkscrew before arriving at the ride's final brake run.

Premier Rides built several of these LIM Catapult roller coasters from 1996 to 1999, although only the two Flight of Fear rides are indoors. The other outdoor LIM Catapult coaster in the United States is Poltergeist at Six Flags Fiesta Texas; that opened in 1999. In addition, a LIM Catapult coaster called Mad Cobra operated at Suzuka Circuit in Japan from 1998–2003; Mad Cobra was moved to China and reopened at Kingdoms of Discovery in (2006-2026). The five Premier LIM catapult coasters share a similar layout and have the same technical specifications.

Premier Rides gave the trains an overhaul in 2002 and replaced the restraints with lap bars.

== Ride Elements ==
- Cobra Roll
- Sidewinder
- Corkscrew

== Awards ==
Mitch Hawker's Best Roller Coaster Poll: Best Steel-Tracked Roller Coaster
Year	2000	2001	2002	2003	2004	2005	2006
Ranking	137	134	143	115	113	121	150

== Incidents ==
On April 13, 2017, a train stalled 100 feet (30 m) off the ground at a 30-degree angle stranding 24 riders. They were evacuated safely, and there were no reported injuries. The roller coaster was stuck in the same position it was in when a similar incident occurred in 2014, where it took more than four hours to evacuate the stranded riders.

== See also ==
- Poltergeist, a similar ride at Six Flags Fiesta Texas
- Flight of Fear, similar, but enclosed, rides at Kings Island and Kings Dominion
- Incidents at Six Flags parks
