= Tempesto =

Launched roller coaster at Busch Gardens Williamsburg

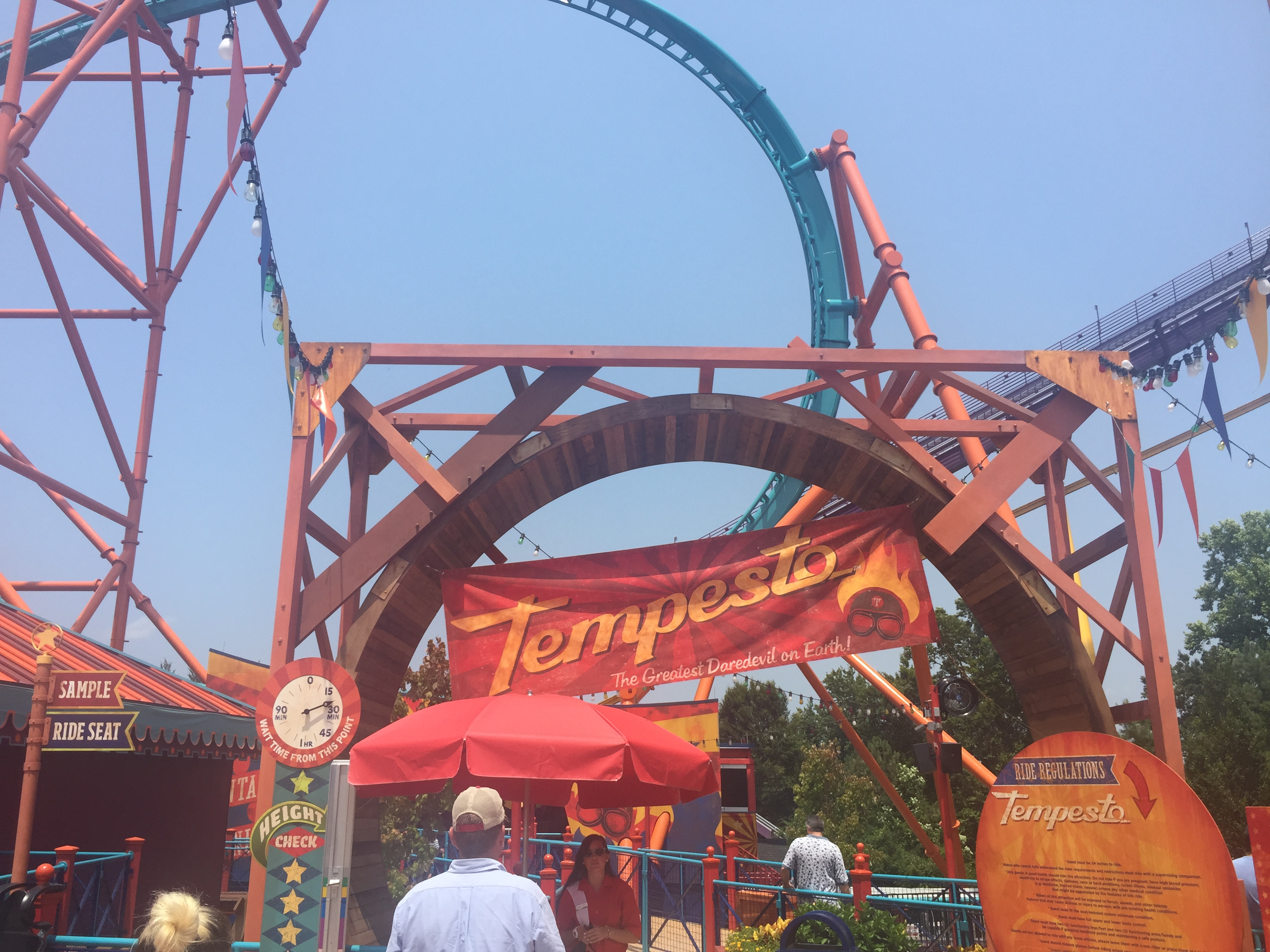

Busch Gardens Williamsburg
- Location: Busch Gardens Williamsburg
- Park section: Festa Italia
- Coordinates: 37.2347222°N 76.6420766°W
- Status: Operating
- Opening date: April 25, 2015

General statistics
- Type: Steel – Launched
- Manufacturer: Premier Rides
- Model: Sky Rocket II
- Lift/launch system: LSM Launch Track
- Height: 150 ft (46 m)
- Drop: 135 ft (41 m)
- Length: 863 ft (263 m)
- Speed: 62 mph (100 km/h)
- Inversions: 1
- Duration: 55 seconds
- Height restriction: 54 in (137 cm)
- Trains: Single train with 3 cars. Riders are arranged 2 across in 3 rows for a total of 18 riders per train.
- Quick Queue available
- Tempesto at RCDB

Video

Tempesto is a steel roller coaster at Busch Gardens Williamsburg amusement park located in Williamsburg, Virginia, United States. Built and manufactured by Premier Rides, Tempesto opened on April 25, 2015.

== History ==
On October 7, 2013, Busch Gardens Williamsburg filed permits to expand the Festa Italia section with a new attraction over 156 feet (48 m). Officials had conducted a line of sight test over the Italian-themed areas. Forum member Party Rocker found evidence that the park was conducting soil tests within a 50-foot radius around the San Marco theater. Guests were greeted with an interesting sight upon walking into Festa Italia with markings shown up all over a massive chunk of a hamlet.

In April 2014, rumors began to surface that a Premier Rides Sky Rocket II could be coming to the park. According to the blueprints, the new attraction would be located towards the front of the park right behind Apollo's Chariot. It was speculated that the ride's name could be Tempesto or Diavolo.

Construction began in August 2014 when the land was cleared. By September, several concrete footers were already poured. The first track pieces arrived in November. It was confirmed that the ride would be a Premier Rides Sky Rocket II. That same month, the ride's structure started to go up. The track layout was completed in January 2015.

On March 21, 2015, it was announced that the new coaster would be named Tempesto. The ride officially debuted on April 25, 2015.

== Ride experience ==
Tempesto launches out of the station up into a partial twist. The train then falls back through the station, where it is accelerated backwards into another twist. Once again, the train falls back into the station and riders are accelerated to a top speed of 62 miles per hour (100 km/h). It then travels up to a height of 150 feet (46 m) where it completes a non-inverting half-loop, a heartline roll (ranking it among the tallest inversions in the world) before exiting in a second non-inverting half-loop. It then enters a full non-inverting loop before returning to the station.

== See also ==
- Superman: Ultimate Flight – a similar roller coaster located at Six Flags Discovery Kingdom
