= Imagicaa =

Theme park in Khopoli, India

- Interactive map of Imagicaa
- Location: Khopoli, Maharashtra, India
- Coordinates: 18.768°N 73.279°E
- Status: Operating
- Opened: April 18, 2013
- Owner: Imagicaa World Entertainment Ltd.
- Slogan: Badi Interesting Jagah Hai
- Operating season: Year-round
- Area: 132 acres (theme park); 72 acres (water park)

Attractions
- Total: 38
- Roller coasters: 4
- Water rides: 16
- Other rides: 24
- Website: Official website

Imagicaa is a 130-acre (53 ha) theme park in Khopoli, Raigad District, Maharashtra, India. It is owned by Imagicaa World Entertainment Ltd. Imagicaa is listed on the National Stock Exchange (NSE) and the Bombay Stock Exchange (BSE). Imagicaa has a hotel, water park, and snow park. It is India's largest snow park with edible snow. The parks have an estimated daily capacity of 15,000 visitors. The park has hosted over 10.5 million visitors..

== History ==
This adventure park opened in April 2013.

The park was temporarily closed in March 2020 due to the COVID-19 pandemic. Following a second lockdown due to the pandemic, Imagicaa reopened on 22 October 2021.

== Parks ==
=== Central park ===
The central park was 110 acres in size at its opening. This space is split into six zones: Viva Europa, Americana, Jambo Africa, Asiana, Arabia, and India.

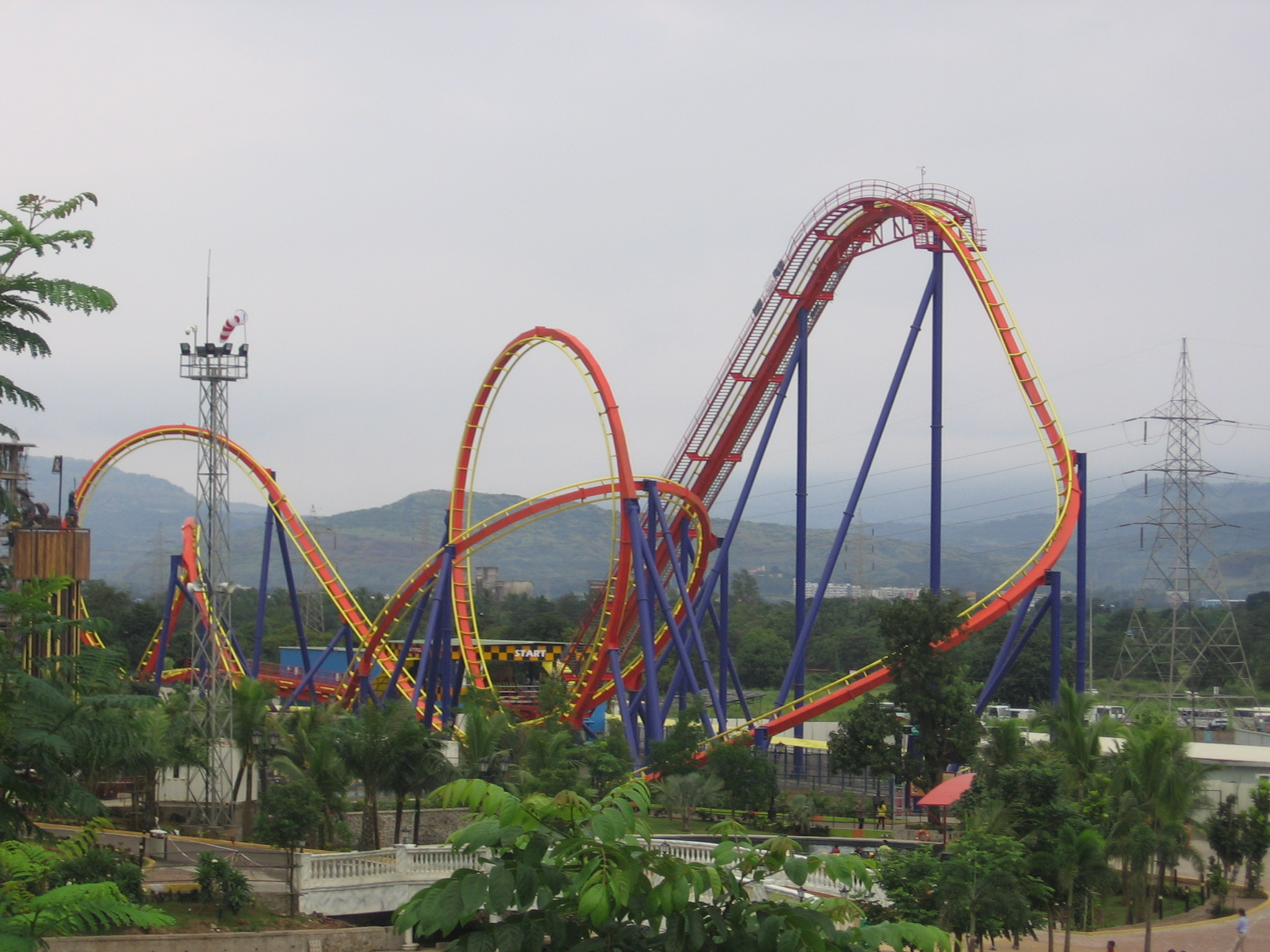
Nitro roller coaster

The park has three roller coasters.

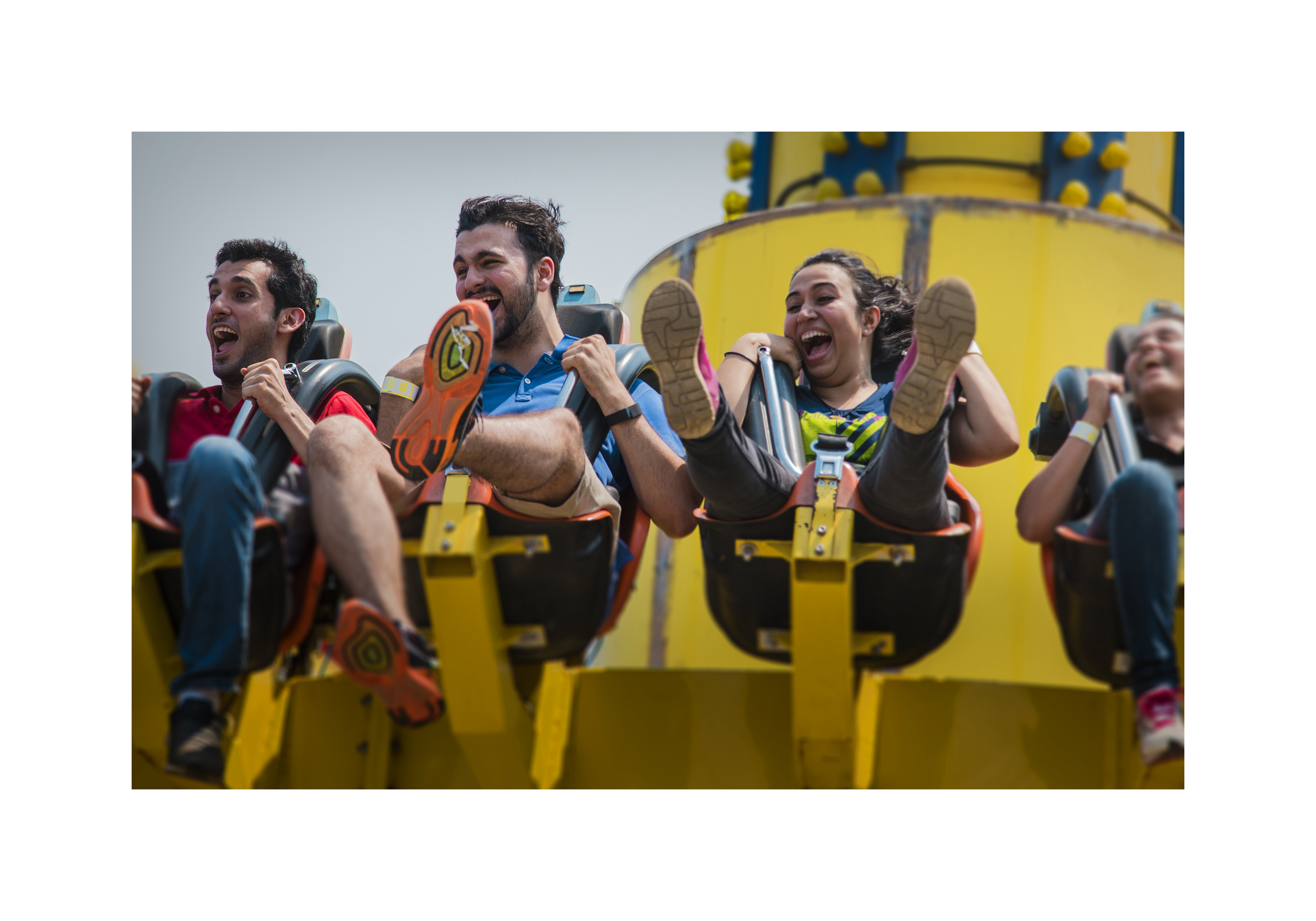
The Scream Machine at Imagicaa Theme Park

The park also has many other rides. One of the rides, "Mr. India", is based on the 1987 Bollywood film “Mr. India" starring Anil Kapoor, while another ride is based on the animated character Chhota Bheem.

The central park also features a comedy show, an evening lights show, and "the first official Bollywood Hall of Fame".

=== Aquamagica ===
The water park opened in 2014, and includes assorted water rides.

=== Snow park ===
In 2016 the Imagicaa Snow Park, an indoor snow-based theme park, was opened. The park is spread across an area of 15,000 sq ft (1,400 m^{2}).

The park holds a special parade and carnival to celebrate Christmas.
