= Superman: Ultimate Flight (Six Flags Discovery Kingdom) =

Launched roller coaster

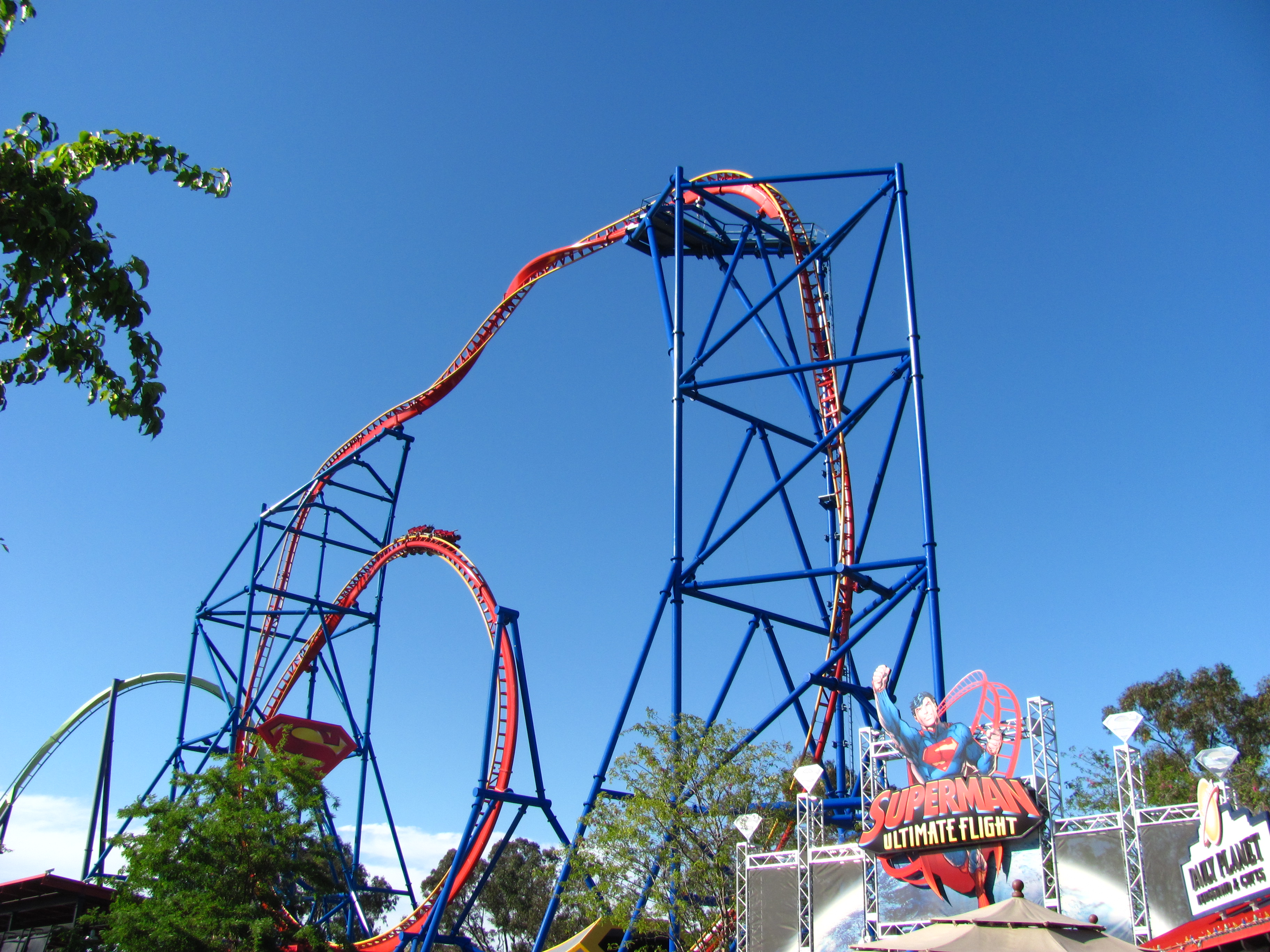
- An overview of Superman: Ultimate Flight at Six Flags Discovery Kingdom

Six Flags Discovery Kingdom
- Location: Six Flags Discovery Kingdom
- Park section: DC Universe
- Coordinates: 38.138648°N 122.231042°W
- Status: Operating
- Soft opening date: June 29, 2012
- Opening date: June 30, 2012
- Cost: $6,000,000 USD
- Replaced: Pandemonium

General statistics
- Type: Steel – Launched
- Manufacturer: Premier Rides
- Model: Sky Rocket II
- Lift/launch system: LSM
- Height: 150 ft (46 m)
- Drop: 135 ft (41 m)
- Length: 863 ft (263 m)
- Speed: 62 mph (100 km/h)
- Inversions: 1
- Duration: 45 seconds
- Max vertical angle: 90°
- Height restriction: 52 in (132 cm)
- Trains: Single train with 2 cars. Riders are arranged 2 across in 3 rows for a total of 12 riders per train.
- Fast Lane available
- Superman: Ultimate Flight at RCDB

Superman: Ultimate Flight is a steel Premier Rides roller coaster located at Six Flags Discovery Kingdom in Vallejo, California. It opened to the public on June 30, 2012.

== History ==
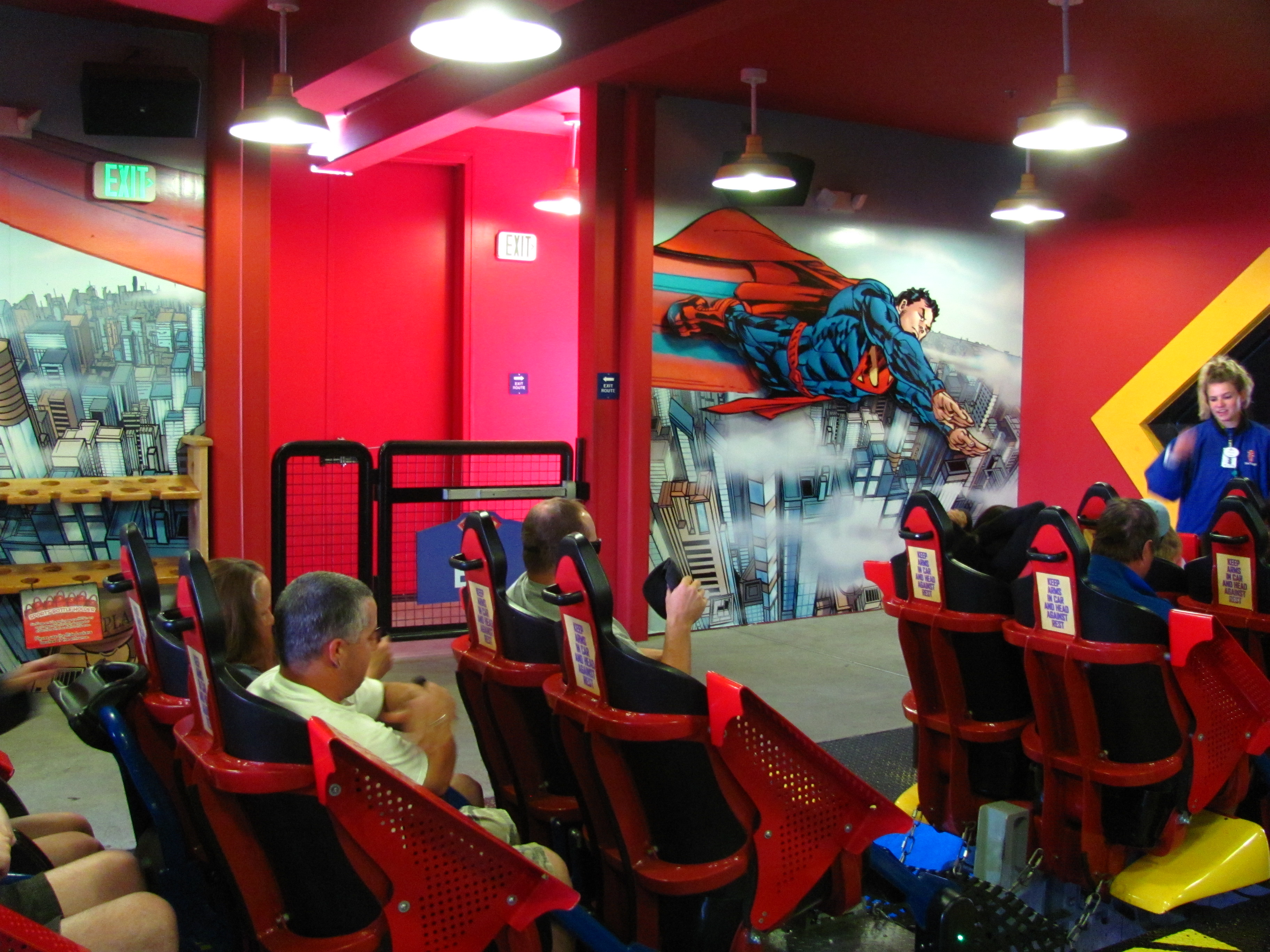
Riders boarding Superman: Ultimate Flight at the station

On August 21, 2011, Six Flags Discovery Kingdom posted on their official website a picture of a man in front of the building, stating "Can you keep a Secret?", with a hint stating, "It is bigger than a breadbox, smaller than Rhode Island, and it's coming in 2012. So get ready for the kind of over-the-top, upside-down, screaming excitement that only Six Flags Discovery Kingdom can offer. Find out more on September 1". On August 27, 2011, the park stated on their Facebook page that they would be announcing their 2012 attraction on September 1. On September 1, 2011, Six Flags Discovery Kingdom officially announced Superman: Ultimate Flight, a Premier Rides launched roller coaster. Superman: Ultimate Fight replaced Pandemonium, a Gerstlauer spinning coaster that has operated at the park since 2008. Just like its predecessor, Superman: Ultimate Flight would reuse the old Zonga station as the extended queue area and PLC room.

Before being transferred to the park, parts of the coaster were manufactured in Salt Lake City, Utah. On March 27, 2012, Six Flags Discovery Kingdom posted on Facebook that the "first of many" track pieces has arrived at the park. Captain Lee, the media spokesman of the park posted on Twitter that the first supports for the coaster has arrived overnight of March 29. The first half of the one and only train was put on the track of the coaster on May 25, 2012. Discovery Kingdom posted on May 30 the opening of the coaster on their website to be set on Friday, June 22, 2012, before being taken down a couple days later. The ride's track was completed on June 6, 2012. Testing began on Superman: Ultimate Flight on June 15, 2012. The ride opened to the public on June 30, 2012. It was the park's first ride to be based on a DC Comics character.

On July 29, 2012, Superman: Ultimate Flight's train stalled, stranding twelve riders 150 feet (46 m) in the air for nearly two hours. Vallejo firefighters were dispatched to the scene and a crane equipped with a large personnel bucket was used to lift two firefighters and a park mechanic to the stalled train. The park mechanic managed to unlock the train, allowing the train to roll backwards and safely lower the riders back to the station. None of the riders were injured. The ride was closed for several days as it underwent a "thorough safety inspection". It reopened shortly thereafter.

== Ride experience ==
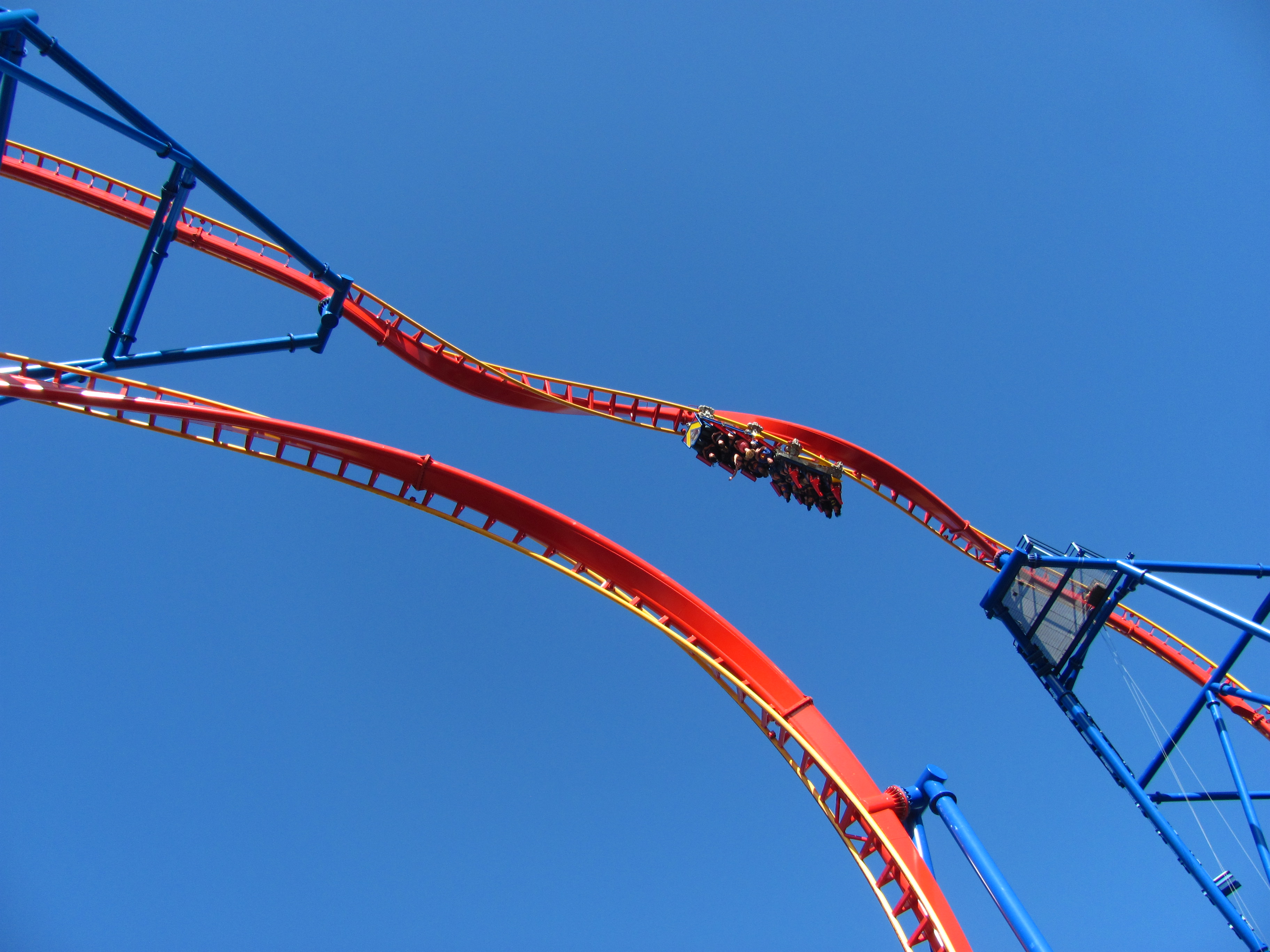
A view upwards at Superman: Ultimate Flight's heartline roll

Superman: Ultimate Flight launches out of the station rising up halfway up the first twist. It then returns backwards through the station into the non-inverting loop. Returning forwards and accelerating riders to a top speed of 62 miles per hour (100 km/h). It then travels up to a height of 150 feet (46 m) where it completes a heartline roll (ranking it among the tallest inversions in the world) before exiting in a second non-inverting half-loop at 133 feet (41 m). It then enters the second twist and returns to the station. The ride can be compared to several of Maurer Söhne's X-Coasters. The non-inverting loop element was previously only found in two of the company's X-Car roller coasters prior to Premier Rides' installation of Superman: Ultimate Flight. Additionally, the ride bears several similarities to the SkyLoop model including design, height and speed. On speakers outside the attraction entrance, John Williams' score is played in a loop.

== See also ==
- 2012 in amusement parks
- Superman: Ultimate Flight, a series of flying roller coasters at Six Flags amusement parks
- Tempesto, a similar coaster at Busch Gardens Williamsburg
