= Rapterra =

Roller coaster at Kings Dominion

Rapterra (roller coaster)

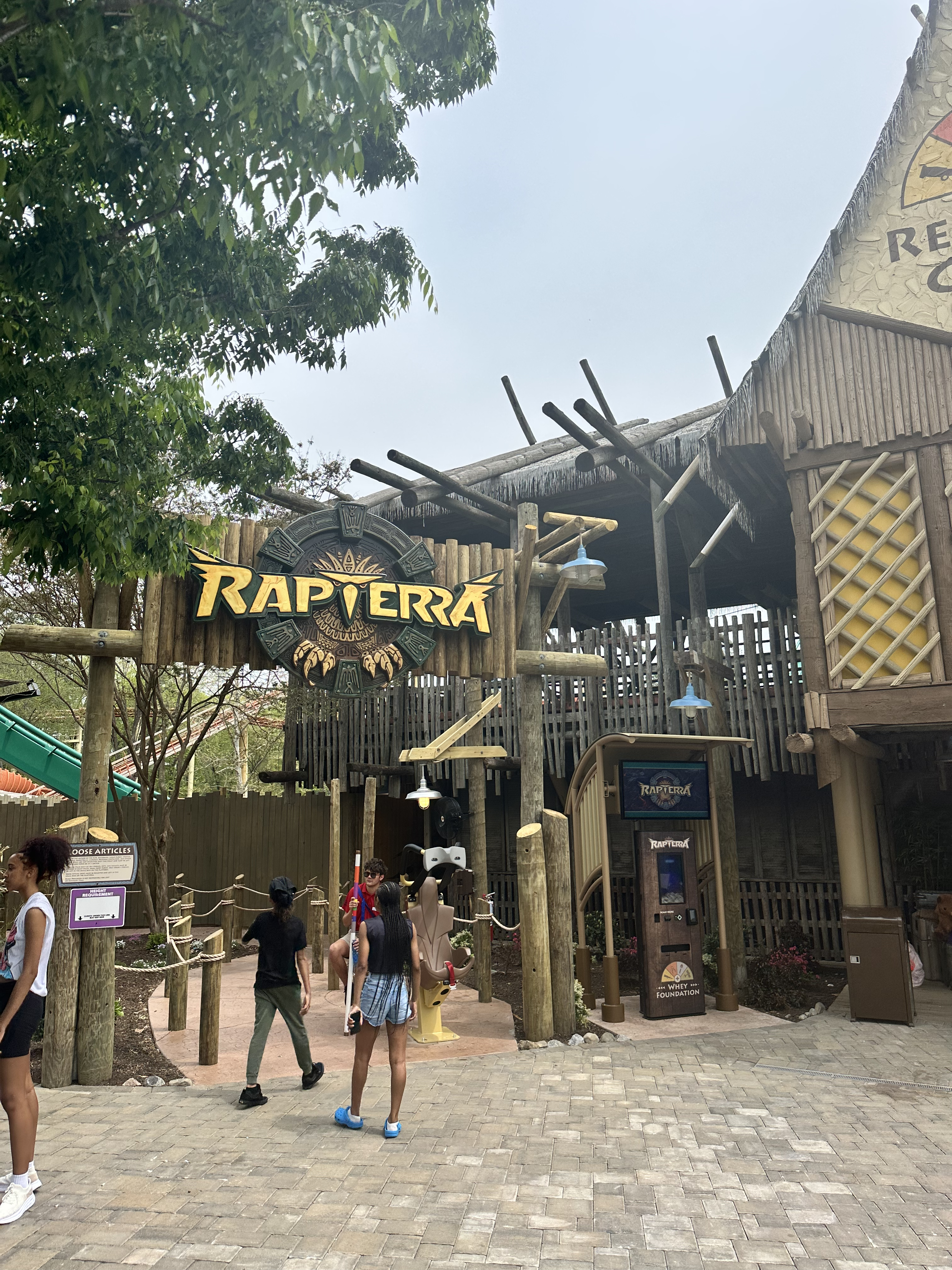
- The entrance to Rapterra

Kings Dominion
- Location: Kings Dominion
- Park section: Jungle X-Pedition
- Coordinates: 37.839133°N 77.439747°W
- Status: Operating
- Opening date: March 29, 2025
- Cost: $30 million
- Replaced: Volcano: The Blast Coaster

General statistics
- Type: Steel – Wing Coaster – Launched
- Manufacturer: Bolliger & Mabillard
- Designer: Bolliger & Mabillard
- Model: Wing Coaster
- Track layout: 3,086 ft
- Lift/launch system: LSM
- Height: 145 ft (44 m)
- Drop: 145 ft (44 m)
- Length: 3,086 ft (941 m)
- Speed: 65 mph (105 km/h)
- Inversions: 3
- Duration: 1:29
- Capacity: 1140 riders per hour
- Height restriction: 48 in (122 cm)
- Trains: 2 trains with 5 cars; riders arranged 4 across in a single row for a total of 20 riders per train
- Fast Lane available
- Rapterra (roller coaster) at RCDB

Rapterra is a steel launched wing roller coaster at Kings Dominion in Doswell, Virginia. It is the world's tallest and longest-launched wing roller coaster.

== History ==
=== Removal of Volcano ===
Volcano: The Blast Coaster was an inverted launched coaster that operated at the park from 1998 to early 2018, situated inside of the preceding Smurf Mountain structure. In February 2019, Kings Dominion announced that Volcano had been decommissioned, citing issues with reliability, rider capacity, and overall customer satisfaction. By May of the same year, the entire attraction had been fully demolished.

The removal of Volcano left a sizable empty site in the park, sparking discussions for a replacement as early as 2019; it was then that Bolliger & Mabillard first drafted a wing coaster layout for the land. However, the park's closure during 2020 per the COVID-19 pandemic and retirement of The Crypt after the 2019 season contributed to Tumbili taking priority as a replacement for the latter. The coaster opened in March 2022, bringing with it the reimagining of Safari Village as Jungle X-Pedition and thematic foundation for future attractions.

=== Preparation & Construction ===
Plans were submitted to Hanover County, Virginia in December 2023 for the construction of Amendment 47, a new roller coaster project to be located where Volcano: The Blast Coaster previously stood. Construction had already commenced when the park opened for the season in March 2023, with groundwork in full swing and the first concrete foundations being poured.

Roller coaster steel – including track and supports – began arriving at the end of May, with the first piece of brake run being placed on June 18, 2024. The tallest point of the ride was topped off at 8:22am on July 28 and the final track piece set in place on September 6, eighty days after installation began.

=== Announcement ===
Kings Dominion began promoting their mystery attraction during construction, with various teasers and clues gradually appearing around its work fences. On July 31, 2024, Kings Dominion officially announced Rapterra for the 2025 season.

== Ride Experience ==
After leaving the station, a small right hand turn leads the train onto the launch track. The trains are then launched at a speed of 65 miles per hour (105 km/h) in 4 seconds, before transitioning into a 145 ft (44 m) "wingover turn". Following is a 119 ft (36 m) dive loop alongside the station. After a 90 ft (27 m) S-turn over the launch track, the train turns back around going through a "wing slide" over the pathway. As it reaches the back of the layout, the train goes through a corkscrew and airtime hill. The ride finishes with a 360° "raptor roll" and right turn into the final brake run that leads back into the station.

== Characteristics ==
Rapterra was the second launched Wing Coaster by Bolliger & Mabillard in the United States, after Thunderbird at Holiday World in Indiana, as well as the third worldwide, following the latter ride and Mandrill Mayhem at Chessington World of Adventures in the United Kingdom. It is 145 feet (44 m) tall, 3,086 feet (941 m) long, and reaches a top speed of 65 mph (105 km/h) throughout the ride. The coaster runs two 20-passenger trains, arranging riders in 5 rows with a pair on each side.
