= Tomb Raider: The Ride =

There were a number of amusement park rides based on the Tomb Raider film franchise:

- Tomb Raider: FireFall, an amusement ride located at Kings Dominion in Doswell, Virginia, United States
- Tomb Raider: The Ride (Canada's Wonderland), a flying roller coaster located at Canada's Wonderland in Vaughan, Ontario, Canada
- Tomb Raider: The Ride (Kings Island), an amusement ride formerly located at Kings Island in Mason, Ohio, United States
- Tomb Raider: The Machine, an amusement ride located at Movieland theme park in Canevaworld Resort in Lazise, Verona, Italy
