= Woodstock Express (Kings Dominion) =

- Previously known as Scooby-Doo (1974 - 1996); Scooby-Doo's Ghoster Coaster (1997 - 2009) Ghoster Coaster (2010 - 2012)
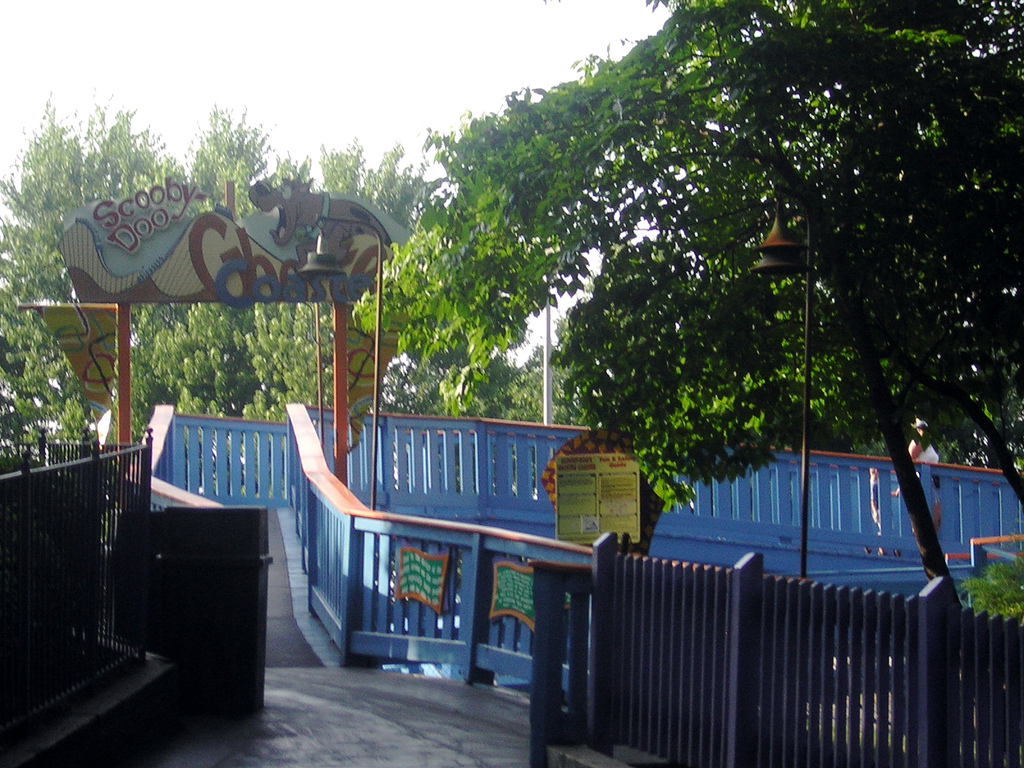
- The exterior queue and marquee to the attraction when it was known as Scooby-Doo's Ghoster Coaster

Kings Dominion
- Location: Kings Dominion
- Park section: Planet Snoopy
- Coordinates: 37°50′25.9″N 77°26′31.9″W
- Status: Operating
- Opening date: 1974

General statistics
- Type: Wood
- Manufacturer: Philadelphia Toboggan Coasters
- Designer: John C. Allen
- Height: 35 ft (11 m)
- Drop: 30 ft (9.1 m)
- Length: 1,385 ft (422 m)
- Speed: 35 mph (56 km/h)
- Inversions: 0
- Duration: 1:40
- Capacity: 1200 riders per hour
- Height restriction: 40 in (102 cm)
- Trains: 2 trains with 5 cars. Riders are arranged 2 across in 2 rows for a total of 20 riders per train.
- Woodstock Express at RCDB

Woodstock Express is a wooden roller coaster located at Kings Dominion in Doswell, Virginia. It opened as Scooby-Doo in 1974 after the Hanna-Barbera cartoon character. Despite being classified as a family roller coaster and located in the children's area of the park, the ride notably has a intensity rating of 4 out of 5.

== History ==
Opening under the original name Scooby-Doo, the junior roller coaster was one of two attractions that opened during a preview event in 1974 prior to the park's official opening in May 1975 (the other was Lion Country Safari). The ride is located in an area of the park previously known as The Happy Land of Hanna-Barbera filled with other attractions that were also themed to cartoons of Hanna-Barbera studios. In 1997, the Kidzville section of the park was built up around the ride, and the name was extended to "Scooby-Doo's Ghoster Coaster". Following the purchase of Paramount Parks by Cedar Fair in 2006, Scooby-Doo and all other Hanna-Barbera themes were removed, and the roller coaster became simply known as Ghoster Coaster in 2010. In 2013, it was renamed again to Woodstock Express as part of the planned expansion of Planet Snoopy.

== ACE Coaster Classic Award ==
Woodstock Express was recognized by the American Coaster Enthusiasts (ACE) as an ACE Coaster Classic and a plaque was awarded. The group has since removed the ride from their list due to design modifications which disqualify the ride. To be designated an ACE Coaster Classic, roller coasters must be made out of wood, not steel, and adhere to strict operational and design criteria including non-ratcheting lap bar restraints, no seat dividers or headrests, and free choice of seating for riders.
