= Reptilian (ride) =

Roller coaster at Kings Dominion

- Previously known as Avalanche (1988–2021)
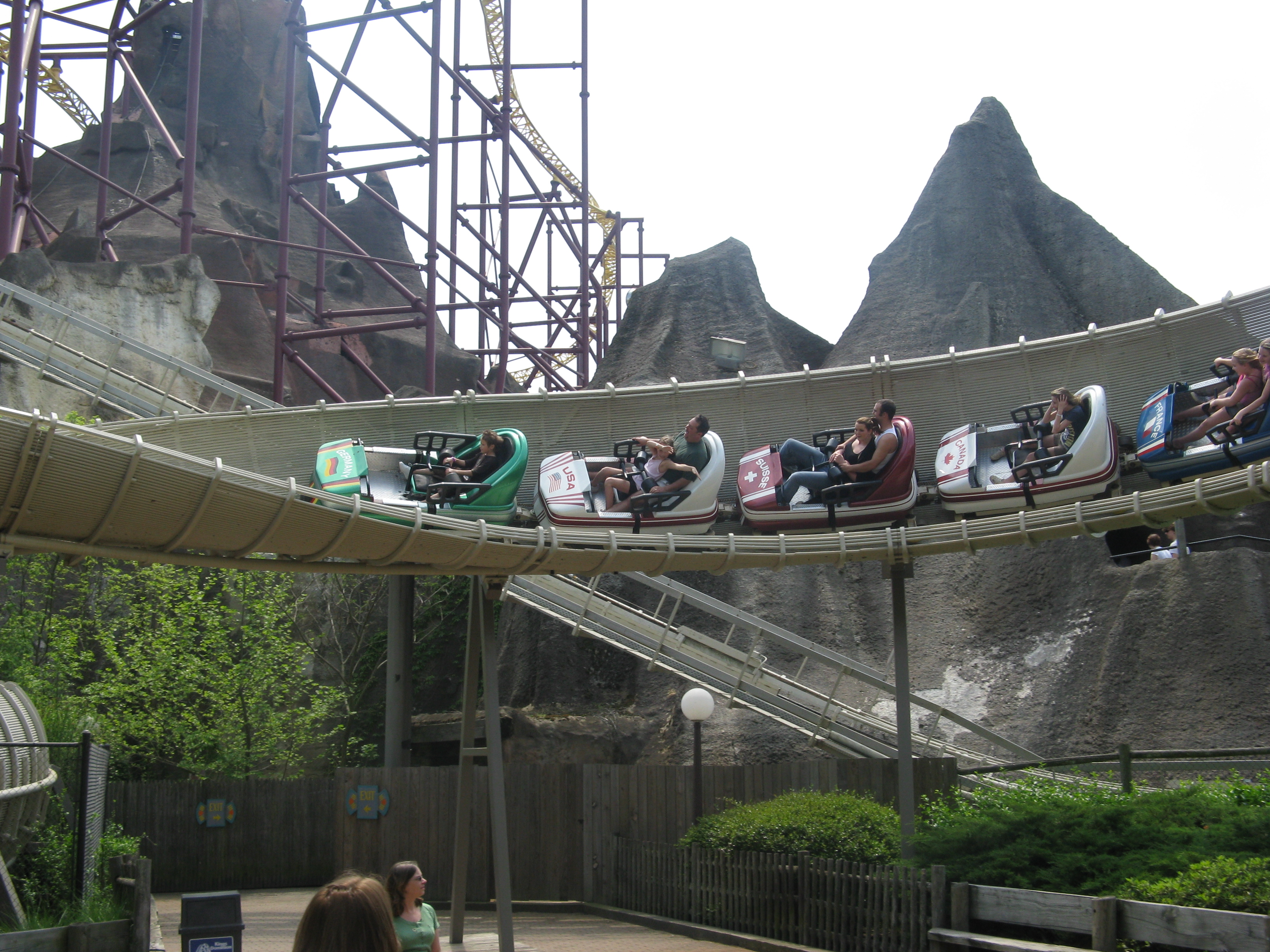
- Reptilian back when it was known as Avalanche, Volcano: The Blast Coaster can be seen in the background

Kings Dominion
- Location: Kings Dominion
- Park section: Jungle X-Pedition
- Coordinates: 37°50′24.47″N 77°26′26.51″W
- Status: Operating
- Opening date: March 26, 1988

General statistics
- Type: Steel
- Manufacturer: Mack Rides
- Model: Bobsled
- Lift/launch system: Chain lift hill
- Speed: 41 mph (66 km/h)
- Inversions: 0
- Height restriction: 40 in (102 cm)
- Trains: 3 trains with 7 cars; riders arranged 1 across in 2 rows for a total of 14 riders per train
- Fast Lane available
- Reptilian at RCDB

Video

Reptilian is a bobsled roller coaster located at Kings Dominion in Doswell, Virginia, United States. Manufactured by Mack Rides, the roller coaster debuted as Avalanche in 1988 and was renamed to Reptilian in 2022 following a refurbishment. The change coincided with the addition of a new themed area at the park called Jungle X-Pedition.

== History ==
In late 1987, Kings Dominion announced that a bobsled roller coaster named Avalanche at the time would be added for the 1988 season. It officially opened to the general public on March 26, 1988.

The coaster did not operate for the 2020 season due to the park being closed for the COVID-19 pandemic. The coaster also remained closed for the 2021 season due to the nearby construction of Tumbili. During the 2021–2022 off-season, Avalanche was repainted orange and rethemed as Reptilian as part of the park's new Jungle X-Pedition area.

== Overview ==
Reptilian features chutes or half pipes without any fixed tracks like most other roller coasters. Having no tracks allows the bobsled cars to move freely.

=== Car design ===
As Avalanche, the ride was themed after Olympic bobsleds that represented five countries. The countries included France, the United States, Germany, Switzerland and Canada. Each car had its country specific Winter Olympic decals. Following the re-theming to Reptilian, the cars were designed to resemble crocodiles.

Each car seats two riders, with one rider sitting in between the legs of the other.
