= Delirium (ride) =

Frisbee amusement ride

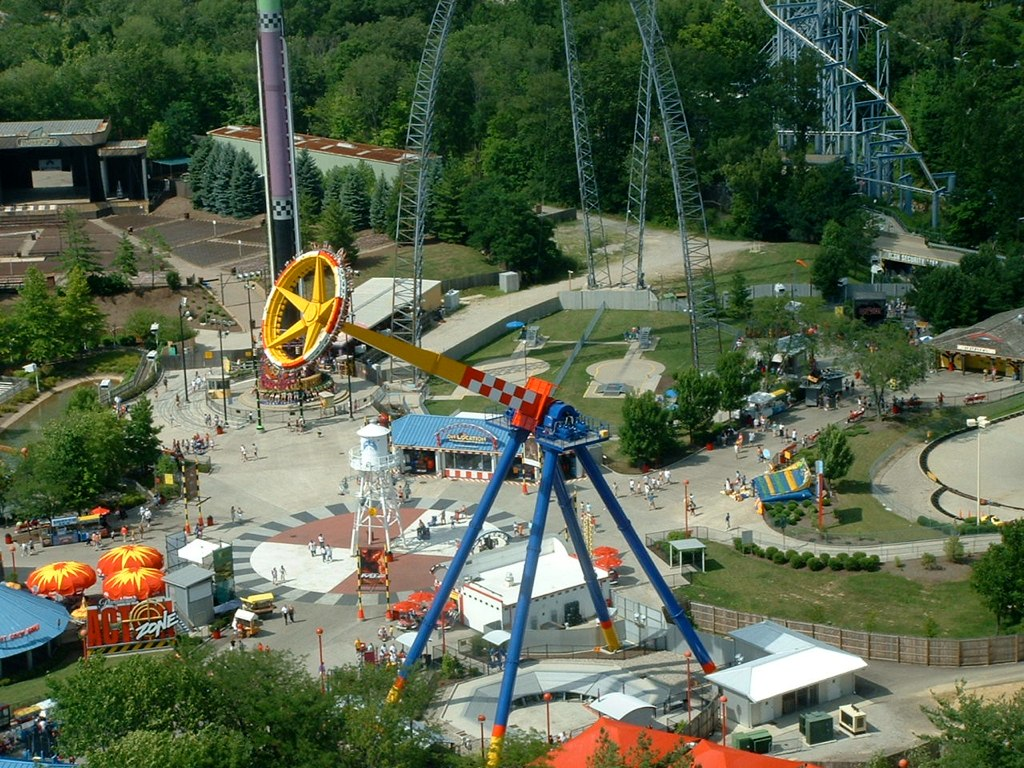
- Delirium in action at Kings Island (2003). The Bat (then known as Top Gun) is also shown in the top right.

Kings Island
- Area: Action Zone
- Coordinates: 39°20′42.66″N 84°15′58.93″W
- Status: Operating
- Cost: $4.5 million
- Opening date: April 3, 2003
- Replaced: King Cobra
- Manufacturer: HUSS Park Attractions
- Model: Giant Frisbee
- Height: 137 ft (42 m)
- Speed: 76 mph (122 km/h)
- Capacity: 600 riders per hour
- Riders per vehicle: 50
- Duration: 2:30
- Height restriction: 52–76 in (132–193 cm)

Kings Dominion
- Area: Candy Apple Grove
- Status: Operating
- Cost: $4.1 million
- Opening date: March 19, 2016
- Replaced: Shockwave
- Manufacturer: Mondial
- Model: Revolution
- Height: 115 ft (35 m)
- Speed: 60 mph (97 km/h)
- Capacity: 1000 riders per hour
- Riders per vehicle: 40
- Duration: 2:04
- Height restriction: 54 in (137 cm)

California's Great America
- Area: All American Corners
- Status: Operating
- Opening date: 2002
- Manufacturer: Chance Rides
- Model: Revolution 32
- Height: 65 ft (20 m)
- Riders per vehicle: 32
- Duration: 1:50
- Height restriction: 48 in (122 cm)

Ride statistics
- Vehicle type: Circular gondola
- Fast Lane available at all 3 parks

Delirium is the name of three Frisbee rides located at three Six Flags parks – California's Great America, Kings Island, and Kings Dominion. The installation at California's Great America, the smallest of the three, was designed by Chance Rides and opened in 2002. The installation at Kings Island was designed by HUSS Park Attractions and opened on April 12, 2003, as the largest Frisbee ride of its kind in the world. The record-setting ride is able to swing 50 passengers up to 76 mph (122 km/h) reaching a height of 137 feet (42 m). Mondial manufactured the version of Delirium at Kings Dominion, which opened in 2016. It accommodates up to 40 passengers, reaches a top speed of 60 mph (97 km/h), and swings to a maximum height of 115 feet (35 m). On November 6, 2026, Six Flags announced that California’s Great America would be permanently closing on September 6, 2027.

== History ==
Throughout the 1990s, roller coaster popularity soared as the number of roller coasters in the United States increased from roughly 165 to over 200 by the end of the decade. As the U.S. economy slowed in 2001, however, many parks began to turn to more cost-effective thrill rides that weren't roller coasters, also known as "flat rides".

Paramount's Great America introduced their Delirium ride, designed by KMG and built by Chance Rides, in 2002. It was the first Frisbee-style ride built in North America, and spun it's 32 riders at 11 RPM while swinging them 180 degrees to a height of 65 feet (20 m).

Paramount's Kings Island decided to test the waters with larger-scale flat rides in 2002, when they introduced a Giant Top Spin ride manufactured by HUSS Park Attractions. HUSS Park Attractions (previously known as Huss Maschinenfabrik) spent most of its existence since the late 1970s creating small and mid-size flat rides for traveling carnivals and small amusement parks, but as the company evolved, they started developing rides that were bigger and accommodated larger numbers of riders. Following the success of the Giant Top Spin, originally known as Tomb Raider: The Ride, the park worked with HUSS to open another flat ride the following year in Kings Island's Action Zone. This time, HUSS modified their Frisbee design, first introduced in 1994, to create its first Giant Frisbee version that increased the capacity to 50 passengers, extended the pendulum arm to 62 feet (19 m), and increased the swing angle to 120 degrees. Riders could now be lifted to a height of 137 feet (42 m) off the ground reaching speeds up to 76 miles per hour (122 km/h) and experiencing a positive g-force of up to 4.5 g.

Kings Dominion purchased a smaller Frisbee design from Mondial, also naming it Delirium, which was added in 2016 on the former site of Shockwave. It also swings in a pendulum motion while rotating clockwise. Although the structure of the ride is only 75 feet (23 m) tall, riders reach a height of 115 feet (35 m) above ground. The ride seats a maximum of 40 riders propelled back and forth up to 60 mph (97 km/h) at an arc of 120 degrees.

== Ride experience ==
The beginning of the line queue is positioned close to one side of the attraction, so that when the ride is in motion, the circular gondola appears to just miss the overhead canvas that protects from falling objects. As a result, a strong breeze is felt by guests waiting in line. Riders are later arranged into two groups of 25 before entering the final section of the line queue. The restraints that secure riders are over the shoulder.

The ride begins with a hissing sound of air, and the metal platform separates into eight pie-shaped wedges as it retracts away from the gondola. Into the first swing, the gondola immediately begins rotating slowly as each consecutive swing intensifies. The rotation allows riders' experience to change throughout the entire ride, and at each swing's peak, a brief floating sensation can be felt. Within thirty seconds, the pendulum reaches its maximum arc of 240 degrees. As the ride cycle nears the end, the pendulum slows to a stop nearly as fast as it accelerated in the beginning. Within a few swings, the gondola moves into a controlled stop as the loading platform lifts back into place.
