= Kings Dominion =

Amusement park in Virginia

- Previously known as Paramount's Kings Dominion, 1993–2006
- Logo used since 2007

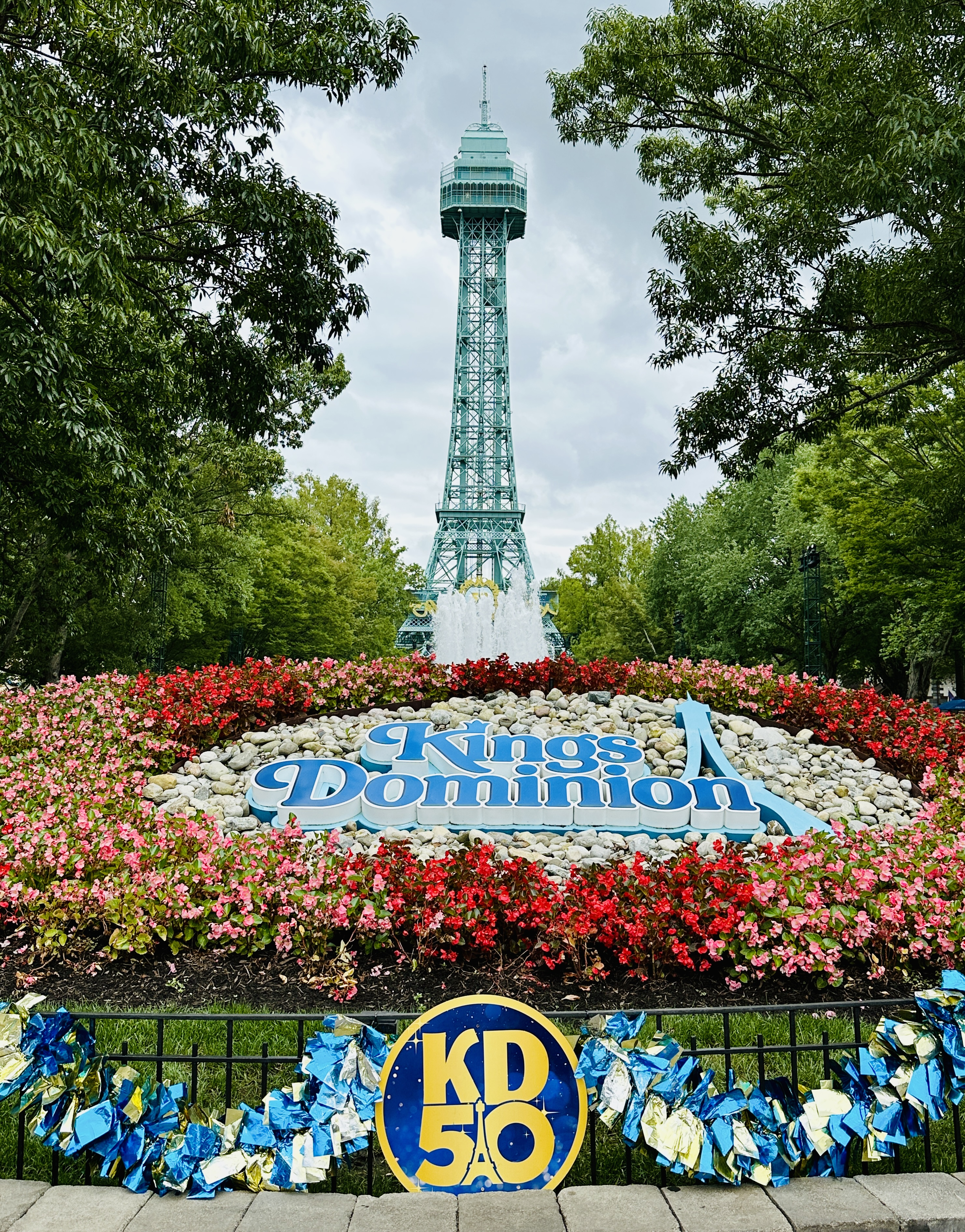
- Eiffel Tower and fountains at Kings Dominion's entrance plaza in 2025
- Interactive map of Kings Dominion
- Location: Doswell, Virginia, U.S.
- Coordinates: 37.840°N 77.445°W
- Status: Operating
- Opened: May 3, 1975; 51 years ago
- Owner: Six Flags
- Former owners: Family Leisure Centers (1975–1980); Taft Broadcasting Company (1980–1984); Kings Entertainment Company (1984–1992); Paramount Communications (1992–2006); Cedar Fair (2006–2024)
- General manager: Jennifer Schofield
- Slogan: Virginia's Premier Destination for Fun
- Operating season: March through Early November
- Area: 280 acres (1.1 km^{2})

Attractions
- Total: 44
- Roller coasters: 13
- Water rides: 2
- Website: sixflags.com/kingsdominion

Location in the United States
Location in Virginia

Kings Dominion is an amusement park in Doswell, Virginia, United States, twenty miles (30 km) north of Richmond and 75 miles (120 km) south of Washington, D.C. Owned and operated by Six Flags, the 280-acre (1.1 km^{2}) park opened to the public on May 3, 1975, featuring over 60 rides, shows and attractions including 13 roller coasters and a 20-acre (8.1 ha) water park. Its name is derived from its sister park, Kings Island near Cincinnati, and the nickname for the Commonwealth of Virginia, "Old Dominion."

== History ==
=== Early history as Kings Dominion (1972–83) ===
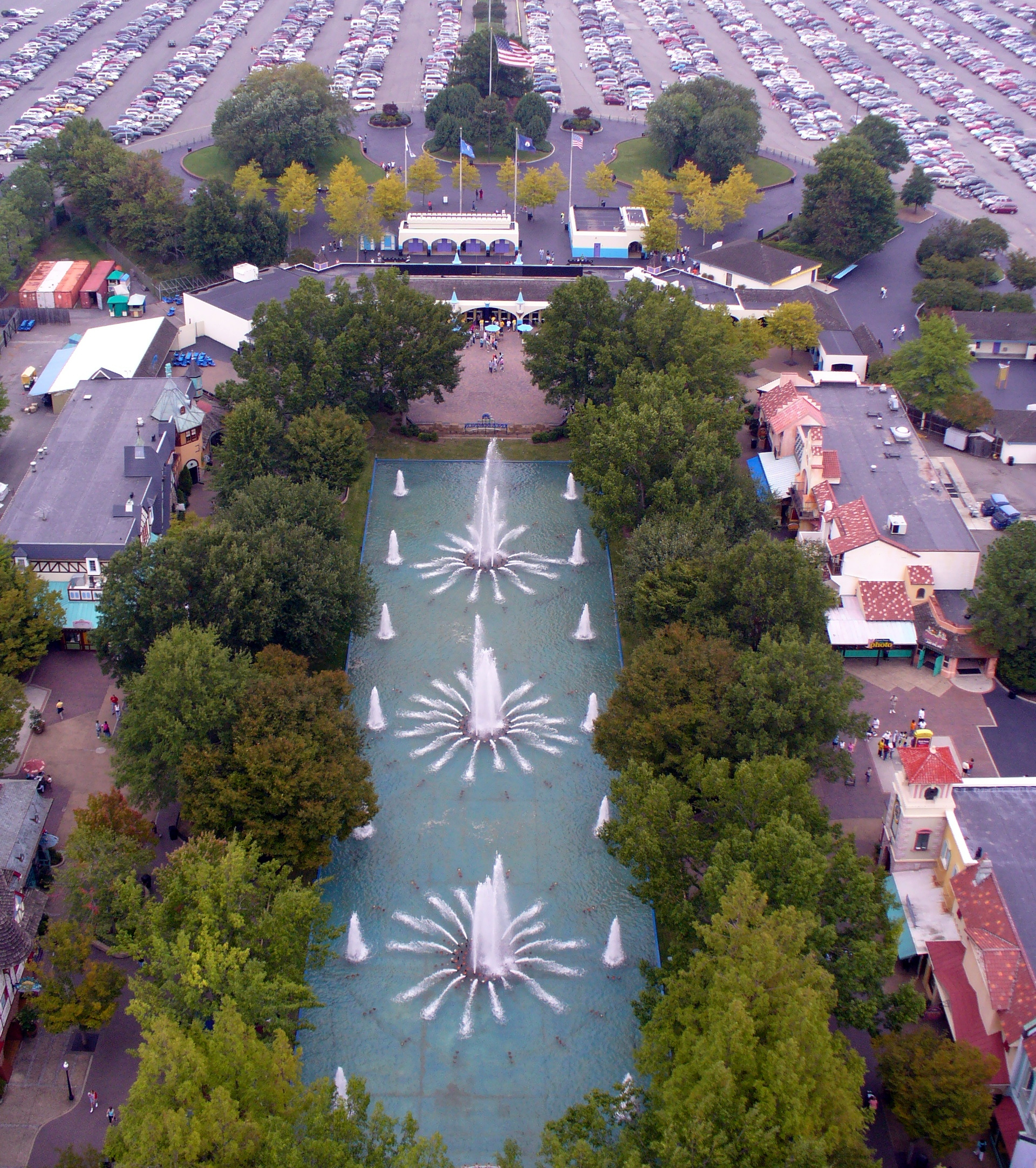
The park entrance as seen from the observation deck of the replica Eiffel Tower

Following the success of Kings Island in Mason, Ohio, Family Leisure Centers (a partnership formed between Taft Broadcasting Company and Top Value Enterprises, owned by supermarket chain Kroger) decided to expand into a new region of the country by opening a second park. A 740-acre (3.0 km^{2}) site was chosen in Doswell, Virginia, with construction beginning on October 1, 1972. The new park was designed with similar themes, rides, and activities as sister park Kings Island.

Following a limited preview of the park's Lion Country Safari, a drive-through animal zoo with 230 species of animals, and the Scooby-Doo rollercoaster in 1974, Kings Dominion officially opened on May 3, 1975, offering fifteen attractions including the Rebel Yell (later renamed Racer 75), the Lion Country Safari Monorail, Galaxie, and a junior wooden roller coaster known as Scooby-Doo. Also present at the opening was a log flume, steam train, a collection of flat rides and a cable-car sky ride that transported visitors between Old Virginia and The Happy Land of Hanna-Barbera. In addition, Kings Dominion's 1/3-scale replica of the Eiffel Tower and the International Street Fountain greet visitors near the main entrance to the park. Original themed areas included The Happy Land of Hanna-Barbera, International Street, Lion Country Safari, Old Virginia, and Coney Island. Daily admission price in 1975 was $7.50, and a dollar for parking. Opening day of the park saw 50,000 guests, with an additional 50,000-60,000 guests waiting to enter.

Kings Dominion added its fourth roller coaster, a Schwarzkopf shuttle loop known as the King Kobra, in 1977. The King Kobra featured a 50-ton counterweight drop launch and was the park's first launched roller coaster. It was in the park for nine seasons before being relocated to Jolly Roger Amusement Park in Ocean City, Maryland, Alton Towers in England, and later to Hopi Hari in Brazil where it exists today as Katapul. Also in 1977, Kings Dominion was one of several amusement parks serving as location for the film Rollercoaster.

A campground was completed in time for the 1978 season and the park's well-known Lost World mountain debuted in 1979. Originally, the Lost World featured three rides: a flume ride called Voyage to Atlantis, a children's attraction mine ride known as Land of the Dooz, and a rotor called Time Shaft. Only a year later in 1980, the flume ride was rethemed Haunted River. Kings Dominion later expanded Old Virginia with the addition of the park's third wooden roller coaster, Grizzly, in 1982 and a river rapids ride called White Water Canyon in 1983.

Kings Dominion was also active in political lobbying. They and other entertainment businesses convinced Virginia to make it illegal for schools to start classes before the Labor Day holiday in early September. They thought that if students were not able to attend school in August, then more families would spend money at Kings Dominion, and more teenagers would be able to provide a low-cost workforce to the amusement park. This law, known as the Kings Dominion Law after the amusement park, stayed in force until 2019.

=== Growth under KECO management (1983–92) ===
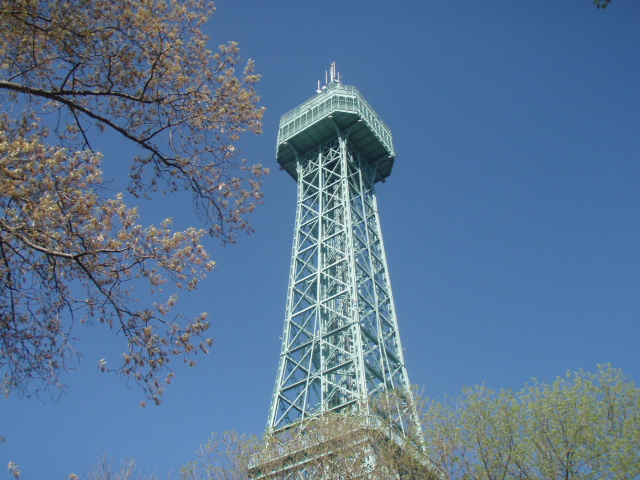
The replica Eiffel Tower at Kings Dominion

Taft Broadcasting Company sold its theme park division in late 1983 for $167.5 million to Kings Entertainment Company (KECO), a new company formed by senior executives and general managers of Taft's Amusement Park Group. Three parks were involved in the sale – Kings Island, Kings Dominion, and Carowinds – along with a 20-percent stake in Canada's Wonderland. American Financial Group later purchased KECO in 1987 but allowed KECO to continue to manage operations at the amusement parks.

One of the first additions under the new management group was Berserker – a looping starship ride added to International Street in 1984. Also that year, Smurf Mountain replaced the mine ride Land of the Dooz, transforming the Lost World into The Smurfs theme. Kings Dominion unveiled a TOGO stand-up roller coaster in 1986 called Shockwave, the first of three roller coasters to be added under KECO. Shockwave had one loop, similar to the older King Kobra but added a helix. King Kobra was removed at the end of the season. A water slide complex known as Racing Rivers opened in 1987, and Avalanche, which remains the only Mack bobsled roller coaster in the United States, debuted the following year in 1988. The trains of Avalanche now known as “Reptilian” were themed after bobsleds from various countries including the United States, France, Germany, Canada and Switzerland creating the experience of a bobsled race in the Winter Olympics.

Kings Dominion continued to expand over the next few seasons starting with Hanna-Barbera Land in 1990 with the addition of more children's flat rides. A new, looping roller coaster from Arrow Dynamics called Anaconda was introduced the following year in 1991 featuring the world's first underwater tunnel which travels under part of Lake Charles. Anaconda was also originally billed as having six loops, but unlike Arrow's six-inversion coaster Drachen Fire that opened at Busch Gardens Williamsburg the following year, Anaconda actually only featured four inversions: a vertical loop, a sidewinder, and two consecutive corkscrews.

A new 20-acre (81,000 m^{2}) water park addition called Hurricane Reef opened in 1992. To build the water park, Kings Dominion filled in two-thirds of Lake Charles near the Candy Apple Grove region of the park. Originally it featured the Monsoon Chutes (two pairs of free-fall body slides, at 70 and 50 feet (15 m) high, respectively), the Torrential Twist (two enclosed body slides that wrapped around each other), the Pipeline (four open body slides), Cyclone (three enclosed body slides, the center of which was a free-fall), Tidal Wave (two open slides, which riders rode on inner tubes), Splash Island (an area for children with five water slides), and a lazy river.

=== Paramount era (1993–2006) ===
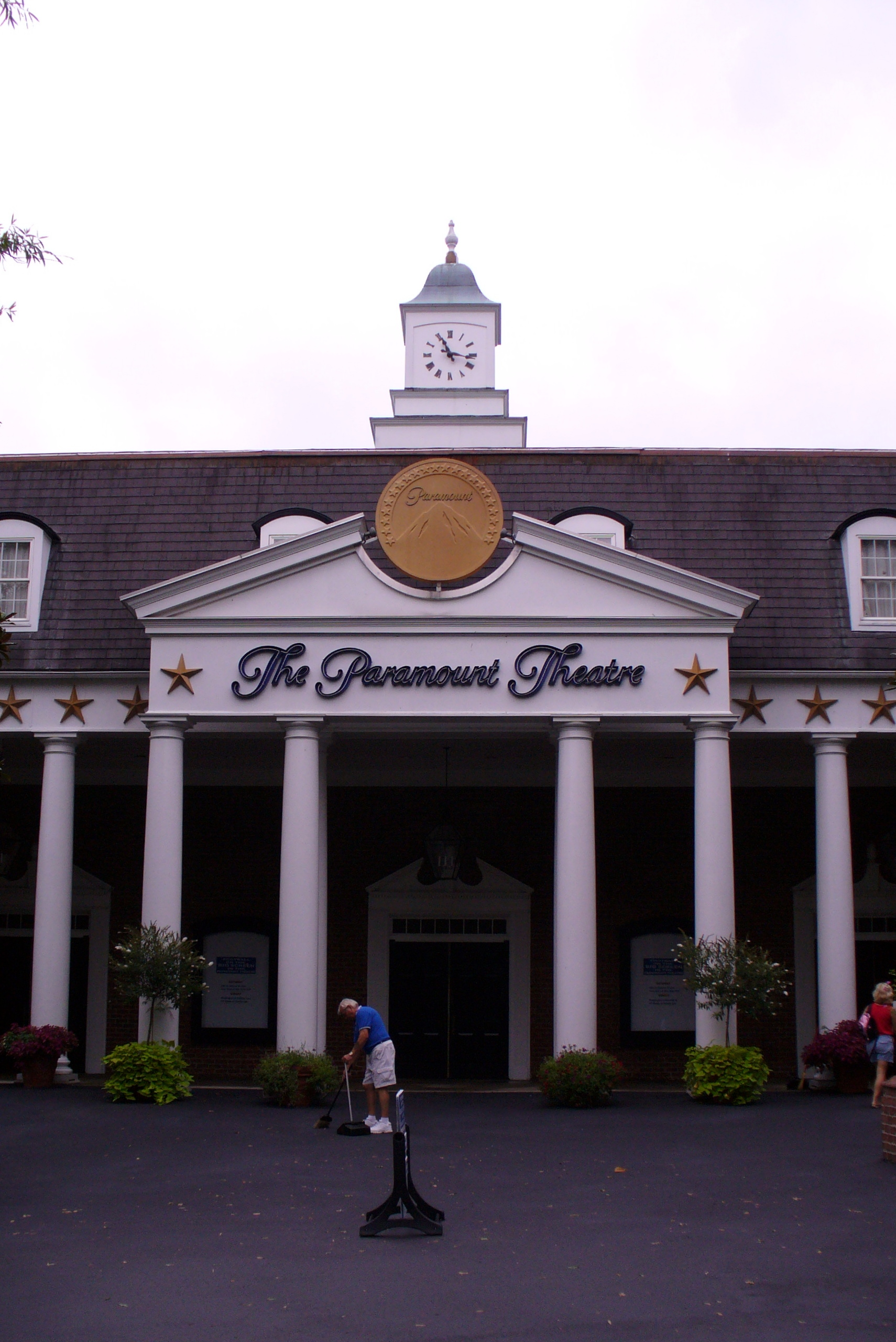
The Paramount Theatre (Now known as "Kings Dominion Theater")

Kings Dominion continued its growth when it became part of Paramount Parks in 1993 and switched its name to Paramount's Kings Dominion. New attractions and areas of the park themed to Paramount's television shows and films appeared at the park almost every season that they were under Paramount's ownership. In 1993, they added a motion simulator attraction, originally featuring the Days of Thunder film, and Lion County Safari was removed at the end of the season. Also in 1993, Smurf Mountain was removed, leaving only the Time Shaft and Haunted River remaining in The Lost World Mountain until 1995 when both rides were removed. The 1994 season saw the addition of a new area of the park themed to the 1992 Paramount motion picture Wayne's World, which featured its third full-size wooden roller coaster, Hurler, a shop called the Rock Shop, and a Stan Mikita's restaurant similar to the one featured in the film. The Skyride attraction was removed. Since then, the Wayne's World section has been merged into Candy Apple Grove; Stan Mikita's was converted to the Juke Box Diner, and the Hurler was converted into Twisted Timbers in 2018. In the next year, another children's area, known as Nickelodeon Splat City, opened near the Shockwave roller coaster, this was a product of Viacom purchasing Paramount in 1994. This was later converted into Nick Central.

In 1996, Kings Dominion introduced its second launched roller coaster, and first LIM-launched roller coaster, The Outer Limits: Flight of Fear. The Outer Limits has a 54 miles per hour (87 km/h) launch, four inversions, and an identical "spaghetti bowl" layout to its sister coaster at Kings Island. Almost as notable as the launch of The Outer Limits was the fact that the entire ride was in semi-darkness; the riders could not see where they were going. Five years after The Outer Limits opened, Paramount Parks' licensing agreement to use theming from the television show after which the ride was named expired; the Outer Limits theming in the ride and its queue was removed, and the ride was renamed Flight of Fear. Also after the 2000 season, Flight of Fear's trains were updated with lap bars, replacing the previous shoulder restraints.

1997 featured the debut of KidZville, a re-theming of the Hanna-Barbera section. The park added the new Taxi Jam roller coaster (now "Great Pumpkin"), and Scooby's Playpark became a construction-themed playpen called Kidz Construction Company. Yogi's Cave was rethemed to Treasure Cave and many rides in KidZville, such as Scooby-Doo's Ghoster Coaster, George Jetson's Spaceport, and Huck's Hot Rods, continued to bear the names of Hanna-Barbera characters.

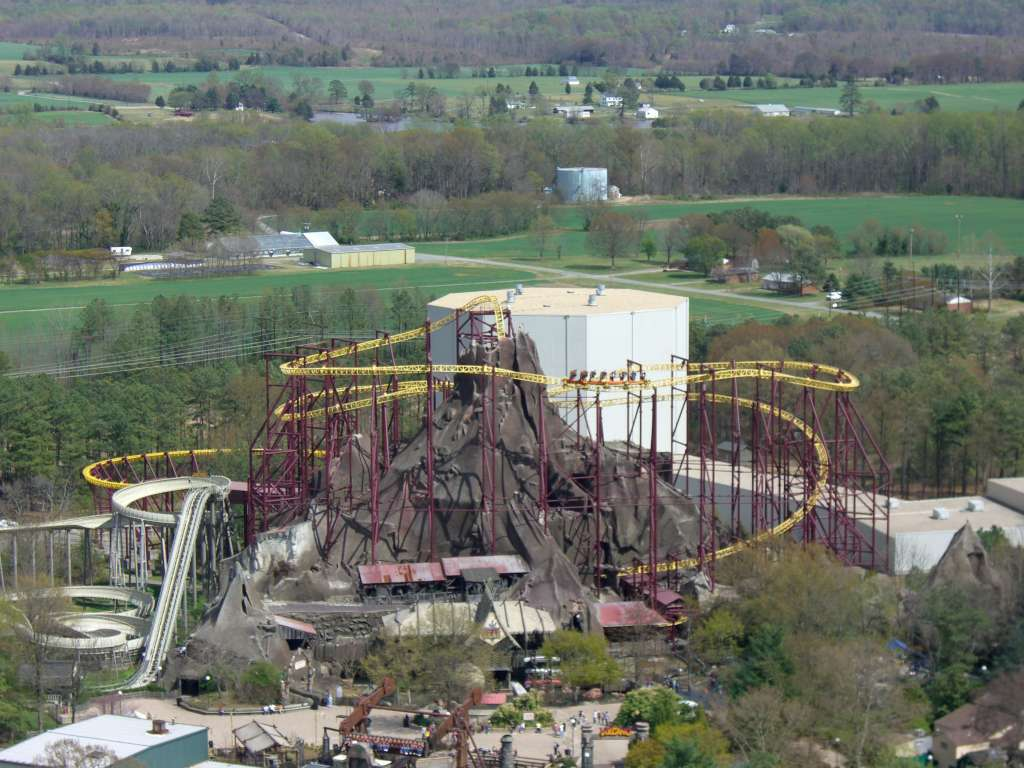
Overview of Volcano: The Blast Coaster and Flight of Fear in the background

Kings Dominion added another launched roller coaster in 1998, Volcano: The Blast Coaster, in the former Lost World mountain. The mountain's previous rides had all been removed several years previously, and Volcano gave the mountain a major transformation. Volcano, which was manufactured by Intamin, was the world's first LIM-launched inverted roller coaster. The ride featured two separate launch sections, a roll-out inversion on the top of the mountain, and three heartline rolls on the way back down. Volcano was themed to the 1997 film Volcano; the other Paramount Parks added inverted or suspended roller coasters themed to Top Gun around the same time. During the next two seasons, Kings Dominion expanded Hurricane Reef behind the Rebel Yell and renamed it WaterWorks. The new portion of WaterWorks includes Pipeline Peak, a set of four enclosed water slides, one of which (the Night Slider) is the world's tallest dark free-fall slide. In 2000, Nick Central opened, replacing Nick Splat City and part of Kidzville.

The park added its third launched roller coaster, Hypersonic XLC, in 2001. Hypersonic XLC, a Thrust Air 2000 air-launched coaster made by S&S Power, launched riders from 0 to 80 miles per hour (130 km/h) in 1.5 seconds, taking them up an 87-degree incline and down an 87-degree drop. The entire ride's duration was about 25 seconds. Hypersonic XLC broke down frequently and was closed for the first three months of its second season; no other Paramount Parks installed a similar ride. Nevertheless, Hypersonic XLC helped establish Kings Dominion's reputation as "the launched coaster capital of the world". Hypersonic XLC was removed after the 2007 season.

The early 2000s saw Kings Dominion opening new rides similar to existing rides at other Paramount Parks. In 2002, the park opened its new wild mouse roller coaster, Ricochet (now known as Apple Zapple), Carowinds also installed its Ricochet in 2002. Diamond Falls, the Shoot the Chute ride closed that season. The 2003 season saw Kings Dominion become the final of several of the Paramount Parks to open a Drop Zone: Stunt Tower, now Drop Tower: Scream Zone. The 305-foot-high (93 m) Drop Zone at Kings Dominion was the tallest freefall ride in the world at the time it opened. In 2004, Kings Dominion added Scooby-Doo! And the Haunted Mansion; similar Scooby-Doo-themed dark rides had opened at three other Paramount Parks during the three previous seasons. In the next season, Kings Dominion added a Huss Top Spin called Tomb Raider: Firefall, and was named The Crypt, which was a standard size and outdoor version of a similar, but larger, ride named Tomb Raider: The Ride (also now The Crypt) at Kings Island. The differences between the two were that at Kings Dominion riders' feet dangled freely while Kings Island's version was a Giant Top Spin which featured a floor. In the 2006 season, Kings Dominion opened the Italian Job Turbo Coaster, its fourth launched roller coaster. Unlike the previously built launched coasters at Kings Dominion, each of which was faster than its predecessor, the Italian Job Turbo Coaster was designed more like a family ride and features multiple launches at 40 miles per hour (64 km/h). The coaster was later renamed the Backlot Stunt Coaster in 2008. It is identical to the Backlot Stunt Coaster rides at Kings Island and Canada's Wonderland, which both opened in 2005.

=== Cedar Fair/Six Flags era (2006–present) ===
On January 27, 2006, it was reported that CBS Corporation (successor of the original Viacom), and owner of Paramount Parks, was interested in selling all of its theme parks, including Paramount's Kings Dominion. CBS stated that amusement parks did not fit the company's new strategy. On May 14, 2006, Cedar Fair announced it was interested in acquiring the five Paramount theme parks from CBS Corporation. The acquisition was completed on June 30, 2006.

Although Cedar Fair continued to use the Paramount's Kings Dominion name through the remainder of the 2006 season, and had a ten-year option to continue using the Paramount pre-fix, it began to phase out the Paramount name in press releases, the park website, and signage within the park.

Kings Dominion expanded WaterWorks for the 2007 season, adding a second wave pool called Tidal Wave Bay, a four-person family raft slide called Zoom Flume, and a ProSlide Tornado.

During the Cedar Fair era, the park introduced Halloween Haunt. While the park had always had a Halloween event, the new HAUNT event has been received very well.

In December 2006, Kings Dominion put Hypersonic XLC up for sale. The park announced plans to keep it running until a buyer was found. It remained in operation during the 2007 season and was closed and dismantled several weeks before the 2008 season started. Also during the 2007–2008 off-season, Cedar Fair renamed the park's last rides to open with Paramount theming. Drop Zone Stunt Tower became Drop Tower Scream Zone and The Italian Job: Turbo Coaster became Backlot Stunt Coaster. Tomb Raider: Firefall also received the name The Crypt. The Paramount Theater also changed its name to Kings Dominion Theater.

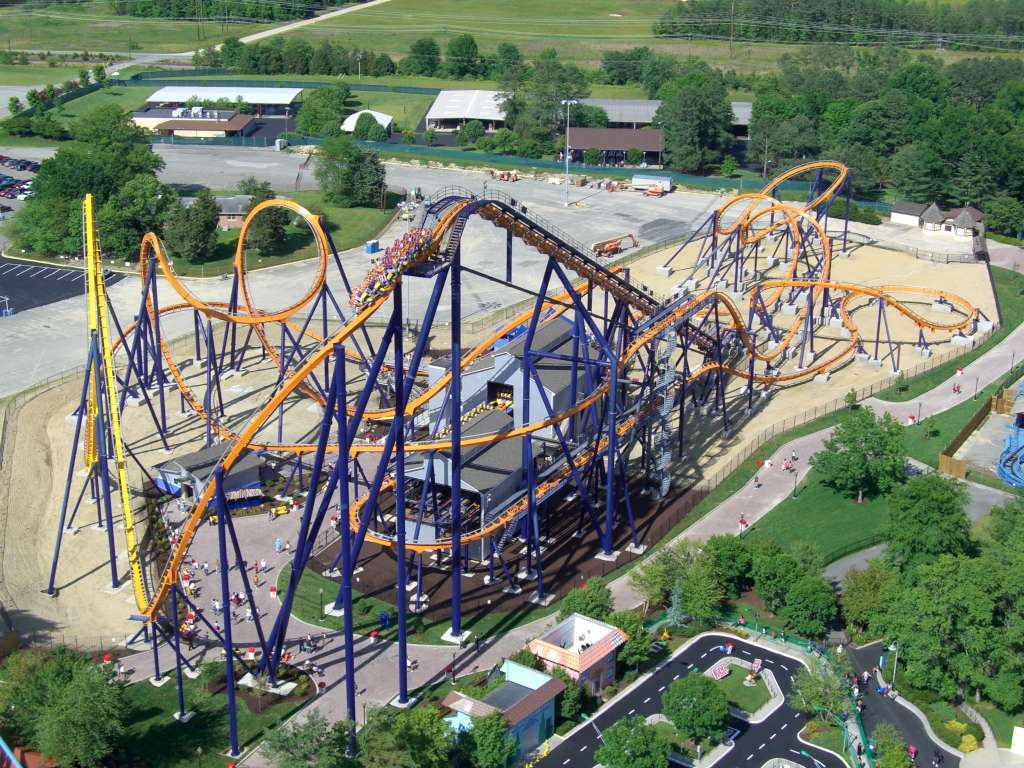
Dominator, a Bolliger & Mabillard floorless roller coaster formerly located at Geauga Lake, opened in 2008 in International Street. Dominator is the longest floorless roller coaster in the world

The 2008 and 2009 seasons saw Kings Dominion receive three rides that had operated at Geauga Lake during its dry amusement park's final season. On October 23, 2007, Kings Dominion announced that Dominator, a floorless roller coaster, would be added to the International Street section. Dominator opened on May 24, 2008, becoming Kings Dominion's first roller coaster with five inversions. For the 2009 season, two flat rides once located at Geauga Lake were opened. Located near Rebel Yell, Americana became Kings Dominion's first Ferris wheel.

For the 2010 season, Kings Dominion opened Intimidator 305, a 305-foot-tall (93 m) giga coaster by Intamin. The ride features a cable lift hill, an 85° first drop and a maximum speed of 90 mph (140 km/h). The ride, which is themed to NASCAR driver Dale Earnhardt, was announced on August 20, 2009, and represents the park's largest-ever capital investment. It was opened to the public in April 2010. Also for the 2010 season, the Kidzville and Nickelodeon Universe areas of the park began being re-themed to Planet Snoopy, as were the children's areas at Canada's Wonderland and Kings Island. The park has renamed the Hanna-Barbera-themed rides in Kidzville to match the Planet Snoopy theme, ending the park's 35-year run with Scooby-Doo and other Hanna-Barbera characters.

For the 2012 season, Kings Dominion installed WindSeeker in the Grove section of the park next to the Juke Box Diner. There are other versions of the ride in Cedar Fair parks such as Canada's Wonderland, Cedar Point, Kings Island, Knott's Berry Farm, and Carowinds. The ride stands 301 feet (92 m) and gives riders a view of the surrounding area. Kings Dominion also added Dinosaurs Alive!, an upcharge dinosaur walkthrough exhibit, located in the Old Virginia section of the park. This attraction also appeared at Kings Island, Dorney Park, Cedar Point, and Canada's Wonderland.

For the 2013 season, Planet Snoopy merged with KidZville during a 7-acre (2.8 ha) expansion to form the largest Planet Snoopy in the Cedar Fair chain. There are now 18 attractions covering 14 acres (5.7 ha).

For the 2014 season, Kings Dominion commemorated the 40th anniversary of Lion Country Safari and the preview-opening of Kings Dominion by returning park icons from past eras. These icons included the return of the classic singing mushrooms, the repainting of Anaconda, an improved queue line for Volcano: The Blast Coaster, the return of classic blue ice cream, among other additions. They also restored Rebel Yell to its original red and blue colors. The 2014 season also saw the return of the iconic floral clock, the popular clown band, and the renaming of Johnny's and Trail's End Grill restaurants to their original respective names, Dinner Bell and Hungry Hippo. New lighting packages were added to the International Street fountains and Rebel Yell. The Congo and Grove sections of the park were returned to the original themes, Safari Village and Candy Apple Grove, respectively.

For the 2015 season, Kings Dominion continued in celebration of its 40th anniversary with a major expansion to WaterWorks. The expansion included a new 65-foot tall slide complex featuring three different attractions called Paradise Plunge, Aqua Blast, and Thunder Falls; a new children's area called Splash Island; expanded cabana areas, updated bathhouses, and other improvements to the area. As part of the major water park expansion, the area was renamed Soak City. On August 9, 2015, Shockwave closed in Candy Apple Grove permanently, and a swinging pendulum ride titled "Delirium" was built in its place. Hurler closed permanently at the end of the season on November 1, 2015. In 2017, Planet Snoopy was expanded with the addition of three new children's rides in the former Nickelodeon Central side of the area. On October 15, 2016, Kings Dominion announced that the Hurler wooden coaster would be permanently closed.

For the 2018 season, Kings Dominion opened Twisted Timbers on March 24, 2018, three years after Hurler operated for the last time, converting the track from wood to steel. It was built by Rocky Mountain Construction utilizing many of the original wooden supports from Hurler. 2018 also marked the debut of WinterFest, a Christmas-themed holiday event, during the winter season. The Rebel Yell and Ricochet coasters were renamed Racer 75 and Apple Zapple, respectively. Tornado, Dinosaurs Alive, and Volcano: The Blast Coaster were all removed before the 2019 season.

In August 2019, Kings Dominion announced that Soak City would be expanded in 2020 to include a new sub-area called Coconut Shores, featuring a multi-level water play structure and a children's wave pool. In January 2020, the park also announced the removal of The Crypt to make room for future development in the Safari Village section of the park.

Kings Dominion did not open for its normal operating schedule in 2020 due to the COVID-19 pandemic. After restrictions were partially lifted by Virginia governor Ralph Northam in November 2020, the park opened for a limited capacity winter event titled "Taste of the Season" that operated for three weeks the following month in December. The event featured specialty food trucks, seasonal decorations, a small selection of rides.

Normal operation resumed for the 2021 season, and in August of that year, the park announced that Safari Village would receive a makeover for 2022. The upgraded section of the park, Jungle X-Pedition, is themed to an archeological research facility and dig site. The area received similarly themed restaurants and retail shops, as well as a new roller coaster named Tumbili, a 4D Free Spin model manufactured by S&S – Sansei Technologies.

On July 1, 2024, a merger of equals between Cedar Fair and Six Flags was completed, creating Six Flags Entertainment Corporation.

In 2025, the park opened Rapterra, a launched wing coaster.

== Areas and attractions ==
=== Candy Apple Grove ===
Candy Apple Grove was known as Coney Island when the park first opened in 1975. It was renamed Candy Apple Grove in 1976. The area is Kings Dominion's largest section in the park, and in its early years, it featured an orchard theme that included three apple-themed rides: Apple Turnover, Bad Apple, and Adam's Apple. Much of the apple-related themes were removed over the years, and the area became known as simply The Grove when it merged with the former Wayne's World area in 2001.

As part of Kings Dominion's 40th-anniversary celebration in 2014, The Grove was restored to its original orchard theme, and the name was changed back to Candy Apple Grove. The animatronic Singing Mushrooms, popular decades ago, was redeveloped with newer technology and placed back on display. Other features that made a return to the area include a fully restored floral clock near the Carousel, oversized candy apples, and the popular blue ice cream that existed in the park for decades.

The westernmost corner of Candy Apple Grove, distinct from the rest of the area, is themed to the 1950s.

Some of the area's more notable rides include WindSeeker, a 301-foot-tall (92 m) swing ride that opened in 2012, and Delirium, a type of pendulum amusement ride that opened in place of stand-up roller coaster Shockwave in 2016. Candy Apple Grove's newest ride, steel coaster Twisted Timbers, opened in 2018 replacing Hurler and reusing some of the previous support structure. In addition to rides, the area features an arcade, carnival games, counter-service restaurants, and a gift shop.

Ride	Opening year	Manufacturer	Description
Americana	2009		A ferris wheel that previously operated at Geauga Lake from 1999 until 2007.
Apple Zapple	2002	Mack Rides	A wild mouse roller coaster. Formerly named Ricochet from (2002–2017).
Bad Apple	2002	HUSS	HUSS Troika. Formerly known as Triple Spin from (2002–2013).
Candy Apple Grove Stage	2018		An outdoor performance stage.
Carousel	1975	Philadelphia Toboggan Company	A historic 1917 wooden carousel, PTC #44. Originally from Roger Williams Park in Providence, Rhode Island.
Delirium	2016	Mondial	A 115-foot-tall (35 m) spinning pendulum flat ride.
Dodgem	1975		A classic bumper cars ride.
Drop Tower	2003	Intamin	A Gyro drop tower. Formerly named Drop Zone: Stunt Tower from (2003–2007).
Racer 75	1975	Philadelphia Toboggan Company	A racing dual-tracked wooden roller coaster. Formerly named Rebel Yell from (1975–2017).
Twisted Timbers	2018	Rocky Mountain Construction	A steel hybrid coaster; replaced Hurler which operated from 1994 to 2015.
Wave Swinger	1975	Zierer	A suspended swing ride that rotates with a wave motion lifting riders more than 30 feet (9.1 m) in the air.
WindSeeker	2012	Mondial	A tower swinger ride featuring two-person swings that slowly rotate and ascend the 301-foot (92 m) tower until reaching the top where speeds increase up to 30 miles per hour (48 km/h).

=== International Street ===
International Street is the park's main entry area, featuring a 320-foot-long (98 m) rectangular fountain pool in the center of the walkway, which leads up to a 1/3 scale replica of the Eiffel Tower. Guests can ascend the tower by elevator up to the 315-foot-tall (96 m) observation deck. International Street is designed to showcase a variety of European architecture, with buildings representing France, Germany, Switzerland, Spain, and Italy. The buildings contain an assortment of gift shops, specialty shops, cafés and eateries. The International Street section of the park, which originally included the walkway, buildings, and Eiffel Tower, was expanded under Paramount ownership to include the former Action Theater.

Ride	Opening year	Manufacturer	Description
Dominator	2008	Bolliger & Mabillard	A steel floorless roller coaster. Originally from Geauga Lake in Ohio from 2000 to 2007. Dominator is the world's longest floorless coaster at 4,210 feet (1,280 m), and it has one of the tallest vertical loops in the world at 135 ft (41 m).
Eiffel Tower	1975	Intamin	An approximately one-third scale replica of the Eiffel Tower in Paris at 315 feet (96 m) and 450 tons. There is an exact replica of this tower at Kings Island, Mason, Ohio (the original).
Grande Bandstand	1975		A performance stage beneath the Eiffel Tower.

=== Jungle X-Pedition ===
Jungle X-Pedition is themed to an archeological base camp in a mysterious jungle. The area's fictional backstory centers around an explorer who discovered the uncharted land in 1935, naming the location "Site X." Initially, the area was part of one of the park's original attractions, Lion Country Safari, which contained a monorail train through a nature preserve until its closure in the 1990s. The area's name changed from Lion Country Safari to Safari Village in the mid-1980s and was changed again by Paramount to Congo in the 1990s. In 2014, the area's name reverted to Safari Village to commemorate the park's 40th anniversary. For the 2022 season, the area was rethemed to Jungle X-Pedition, which includes new immersive theming elements, dining, shopping, and a new roller coaster, Tumbili.

The area is home to many of the park's thrill rides and roller coasters. From 1979 until 2019, the area was anchored by a large artificial mountain, originally home to the Lost World ride complex and later to Volcano: The Blast Coaster; the structure was demolished with the coaster in spring 2019.

Ride	Opening year	Manufacturer	Description
Arachnidia	1976	Eli Bridge Company	A classic scrambler ride. Formerly known as Witch Doctor, and later Scrambler (?-2021). Originally located at Candy Apple Grove before moving to Jungle X-Pedition to make room for Drop Tower.
Backlot Stunt Coaster	2006	Premier Rides	A family LIM-launched roller coaster based on the chase sequence of the 2003 remake of The Italian Job. Riders launch into a parking garage, dodge police cars, and are attacked by a helicopter, which ignites fire near the riders before hitting a second launch section, sending riders into pitch-black darkness. Formerly known as The Italian Job: Turbo Coaster (2006–2007).
Flight of Fear	1996	Premier Rides	A LIM-launched roller coaster prototype. Over-the-Shoulder harnesses were removed and replaced with lap bars after the 2000 season. Formerly known as Outer Limits: Flight of Fear (1996–2000).
Pantherian	2010	Intamin	A giga coaster that is one of the tallest in the world. Originally opened as Intimidator 305 in reference to the nickname of former NASCAR driver Dale Earnhardt, "The Intimidator", and the coaster's 305-foot (93 m) lift hill. It was temporarily renamed Project 305 for the 2024 season.
Rapterra	2025	Bolliger & Mabillard	A steel wing roller coaster. Rapterra is the world's tallest and longest launched wing coaster at 145 feet (44.2 m) and 3,086 feet (940.6 m), respectively.
Reptilian	1988	Mack Rides	A bobsled roller coaster that is the only Mack bobsled coaster currently operating in the United States. Formerly known as Avalanche (1988–2021).
Tumbili	2022	S&S – Sansei Technologies	A 4D Free Spin roller coaster; replaced The Crypt which operated from 2005 to 2019.

=== Old Virginia ===
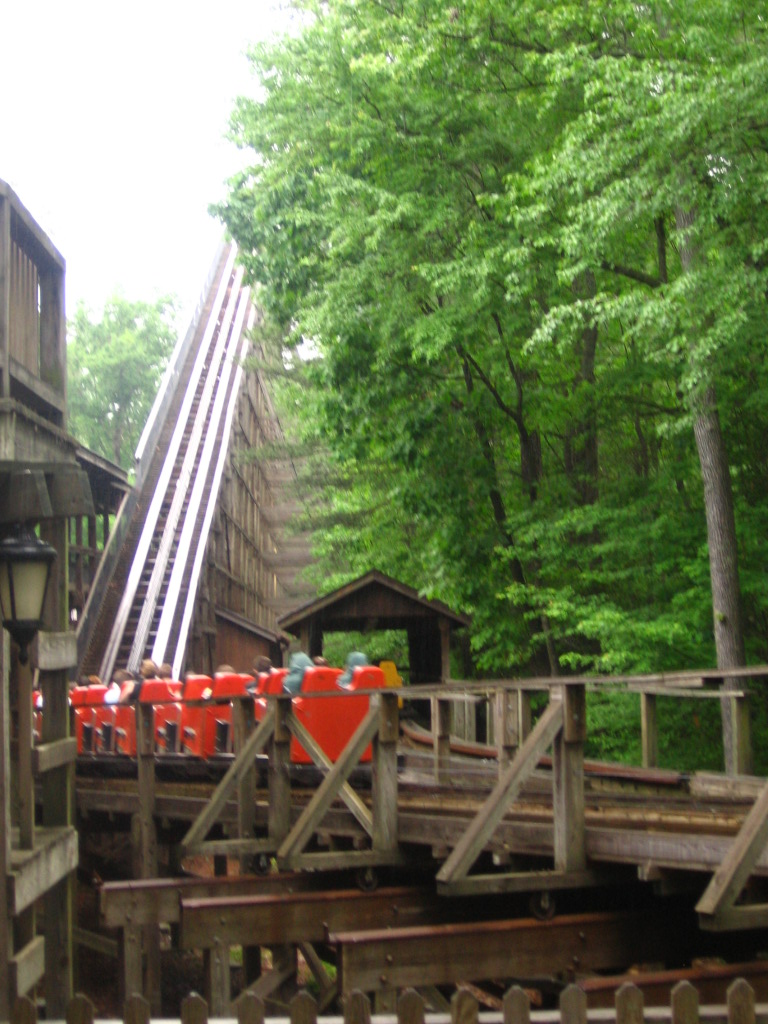
Grizzly

Along with International Street, Old Virginia is the only original section of Kings Dominion that has kept its same name throughout the park's history. Set in the Blue Ridge Mountains, the area has a vintage, rustic theme marked by its wooded architecture and country-style decor. An Intamin Flying Dutchman flat ride called Jamestown Landing operated in Old Virginia through the 1970s, and was removed in 1980. A steam train ride called Old Dominion Line operated nearby in the same park section. It has since been removed.

Ride	Opening year	Manufacturer	Description
Blue Ridge Tollway	1975	Arrow Development	Passenger-driven cars that ride along on a guide rail.
Flying Eagles	1975	Bisch-Rocco	A Flying Scooters type ride.
Grizzly	1982	Curtis D. Summers/Taft Broadcasting	A wooden roller coaster similar to Wilde Beast at Canada's Wonderland
Kings Dominion Theater	1975		An indoor performance theater. Originally named The Mason-Dixon Music Hall, and later named The Paramount Theatre during the Paramount era, the venue has shown a variety of 3-D, comedy, musical, and animated shows, as well as live bands, over the years.
Shenandoah Lumber Company	1975	Arrow Development	A classic log flume ride.
White Water Canyon	1983	Intamin	A River rafting ride.

=== Planet Snoopy ===
While under Paramount ownership, Nickelodeon Splat City debuted in 1995, which was later renamed Nickelodeon Central in 2000. After Cedar Fair acquired the park, the area was redesigned in 2010 using a Peanuts theme, one of Cedar Fair's (now Six Flags) predominant I.P.s, with Snoopy serving as one of the central characters. In 2013, Kings Dominion merged the KidZville section of the park, introducing new attractions and retheming others. Another expansion in 2017 updated the former Nickelodeon Central area of Planet Snoopy with three new attractions and a covered pavilion area.

Ride	Height Requirement	Manufacture	Opening year	Description
Boo Blasters on Boo Hill	Over 42" or with adult	Sally Corporation	2010	An interactive dark ride; replaced Scooby-Doo and the Haunted Mansion
Charlie Brown's Wind Up	Over 36" or with adult	Zamperla	2013	A small-scale swing ride. Replaced Boo Boo's Tree Swing (1975–2009) and Swing A Round (2010–2012)
Flying Ace	Over 48" or 44" with adult	Chance Rides	2000	An Aviator swing ride; formerly Nickelodeon Space Surfer
Flying Ace Balloon Race	Over 42" or with adult	Zamperla	2013	An aerial teacups ride.
Great Pumpkin Coaster	Over 36"	E.F. Miler	1997	A 200-foot-long (61 m) children's coaster. Formerly Taxi Jam.
Kite-Eating Tree	Between 36" and 54"	Zamperla	2017	A mini drop tower.
Linus Launcher	Over 42" or 36" with adult	Zamperla	2013	A circular flat ride on which riders lay face down and swing in a circle.
Lucy's Crabbie Cabbies	Under 54"		1975	Children's bumper cars; Formerly Boulder Bumpers.
Lucy's Tugboat	Over 42" or with adult	Zamperla	2013	A rock-n-tug ride.
Peanuts 500	Over 36" or with adult	Zamperla	2017	A minitature whip ride.
Peanuts Turnpike	Under 54"		1978	A rail-guided car ride. Formerly Top Cat's Turnpike and Junior Turnpike.
Sally's Sea Plane	Over 36" or with adult	Zamperla	2017	Crazy Bus ride.
Snoopy's Junction	Over 36" or with adult	Zamperla	2013	A train ride.
Snoopy vs. Red Baron	Between 36" and 54"		1990	A flat ride where miniature airplanes fly in a circle. Formally Snagglepuss’ Seaplanes, Dick Dastardly's Airfield, and Red Baron
Snoopy's Rocket Express	Over 42" or with adult	Zamperla	2013	A slow-moving monorail ride over the area.
Snoopy's Space Buggies	Over 36" or with adult	Zamperla	2013	A circular flat ride on which vehicles attached to a central console bounce up and down.
Woodstock Express	Over 46" or 40" with adult	Philadelphia Toboggan Coasters	1974	A small wooden roller coaster. Formerly named Scooby-Doo (1974–1996), Scooby-Doo's Ghoster Coaster (1997–2009), and Ghoster Coaster (2010–2012). Opened a year before the rest of the park.
Woodstock Whirlybirds	Over 36" or with adult	Zamperla	2013	A teacups ride.

=== Soak City ===
Soak City, formerly known as WaterWorks, is Kings Dominion's water park. It opened in 1992 as Hurricane Reef and is included with admission to Kings Dominion. In 2015, the water park was expanded and re-branded as Soak City.

== Fast Lane ==
Fast Lane is Kings Dominion's virtual queue system. For an increased cost, visitors get a wristband enabling them to get to the front of the line on 17 of the most popular attractions without queueing.

== Halloween Haunt ==

Halloween Haunt is an annual Halloween event at Kings Dominion on weekends during the months of September and October. It debuted in 2001 as FearFest, but following Cedar Fair's acquisition of the park, the event was renamed Halloween Haunt in 2007. In 2017, Kings Dominion's Halloween Haunt was voted the second-best theme park Halloween event by USA Today. Kings Dominion cancelled the event in 2020 due to the COVID-19 pandemic.

In 2013, Halloween Haunt featured a walk-through maze called Miner's Revenge. Advertisements for the attraction characterized it as "the worst coal mine accident in history," and the attraction featured depictions of dead miners' bodies that had been mangled by a mining disaster. The attraction drew criticism in the press due to the region's experience with mining disasters. Washington Post writer Peter Galuszka (author of a book on the Upper Big Branch Mine disaster) said the attraction "hits a little too close to home for me" since "the idea of abandonment is a difficult topic for miners". He added, "At Kings Dominion, the suggestion of living miners left to die is meant to inject some enjoyable dramatic tension". Kathleen Geier of Washington Monthly decried, "agonizing deaths are being served up for fun and profit to the gawking, peanut-crunching masses" and asked, "What next – a thrill ride based on the Rana Plaza factory disaster in Bangladesh? Auschwitz: The Theme Park?". Following the controversy, Kings Dominion dropped Miner's Revenge from its Halloween maze lineup the following season.

=== Attractions ===
As of October 9, 2026:

Attraction	Type
Blood on the Bayou	Maze
Cleaver Brothers Carnival	Scare Zone
CornStalkers: Blood Harvest	Maze
Diablo: The Infernal Path	Maze
F.E.A.R.	Maze
GrimmWoods	Maze
Masquerade	Scare Zone
Pumpkin Eater	Scare Zone
Site X	Scare Zone
The Catacombs	Scare Zone
Trick or Treat	Maze

== Timeline ==
- 1974: Preview event featuring a film theater, Scooby-Doo (now called Woodstock Express), and Lion Country Safari.
- 1975: Grand opening, Eiffel Tower, Rebel Yell (wooden coaster), and Galaxie (steel coaster)
- 1976: Apple Turnover (Enterprise flat ride)
- 1977: King Kobra (Steel coaster)
- 1978: Kings Dominion Campground
- 1979: Lost World (Themed area) featuring Journey to Atlantis, Land of the Dooz and Time Shaft
- 1980: Haunted River replaced Journey to Atlantis
- 1982: Grizzly and Amphitheater
- 1983: White Water Canyon; Galaxie coaster closed
- 1984: Berserker; Smurf Mountain replaced Land of the Dooz
- 1985: Diamond Falls and Scooby's Play Park
- 1986: Shockwave; King Kobra removed
- 1987: Racing Rivers
- 1988: Avalanche
- 1989: Sky Pilot (replaced Monster)
- 1990: Hanna-Barbera Land expansion
- 1991: Anaconda
- 1992: Hurricane Reef (Water park)
- 1993: Days of Thunder; Smurf Mountain removed
- 1994: Hurler
- 1995: Nickelodeon Splat City; The Time Shaft and The Haunted River are removed, leaving The Lost World completely empty. Old Dominion Line steam train removed
- 1996: The Outer Limits: Flight of Fear and Xtreme SkyFlyer
- 1997: Taxi Jam; Hanna-Barbera Land renamed KidZville
- 1998: Volcano; Action Theater replaces Days of Thunder
- 1999: Expansion of Hurricane Reef to WaterWorks
- 2000: Nickelodeon Central; Pipeline Peak added to WaterWorks
- 2001: HyperSonic XLC (Xtreme Launch Coaster); Stan Lee's 7th Portal 3D (feature in Action Theater); Shockwave and Anaconda repainted with new colors; Flight of Fear loses its Outer Limits theming and has its trains updated with lap bars
- 2002: Ricochet and Triple Spin; Meteor Attack (feature in Action Theater); Diamond Falls closes
- 2003: Drop Tower and SpongeBob SquarePants 3-D (feature in Action Theater)
- 2004: Scooby-Doo & The Haunted Mansion
- 2005: Tomb Raider Firefall (later known as The Crypt)
- 2006: Backlot Stunt Coaster and Thunder Raceway Go-Karts
- 2007: Tidal Wave Bay, Tornado and Zoom Flume added to WaterWorks; FearFest becomes Halloween Haunt
- 2008: Dominator (Originally from the now-closed amusement park Geauga Lake); Hypersonic XLC removed
- 2009: El Dorado and Americana (both relocated from Geauga Lake); Grizzly retracked
- 2010: Intimidator 305 (Intamin Giga Coaster); Nickelodeon Central becomes Planet Snoopy; Boo Blasters on Boo Hill replaces Scooby-Doo & The Haunted Mansion; Rebel Yell retracked
- 2011: Snoopy's Starlight Spectular; Shockwave repainted a new color; Grizzly retracked; El Dorado closes
- 2012: WindSeeker and Dinosaurs Alive!; Fast Lane debuts; Dinosaur 3D replaces SpongeBob SquarePants 3-D (motion seats removed), this was the final year for Snoopy's Splash Dance, Yogi's Cave and 5 other Kidzville rides.
- 2013: Planet Snoopy 7-acre (2.8 ha) expansion and merges with KidZville; 8 new rides were added.
- 2014: 40th Anniversary celebration; International Street fountain restored, Candy Apple Grove and Safari Village return; Volcano: The Blast Coaster and Anaconda retrofitted.
- 2015: 40th Anniversary celebration continues; WaterWorks expands and is renamed to Soak City with new attractions including Aqua Blast, Paradise Plunge, Splash Island and Thunder Falls; Shockwave and Hurler close
- 2016: Delirium opens in place of Shockwave
- 2017: Planet Snoopy expansion with the addition of Kite Eating Tree, Sally's Sea Plane, and Peanuts 500; Tornado closes
- 2018: Twisted Timbers and WinterFest. Rebel Yell renamed Racer 75 and Ricochet renamed Apple Zapple.
- 2019: Big Wave Bay, Dinosaurs Alive, and Volcano: The Blast Coaster close.
- 2020: The Crypt is removed; park closed until December due to the COVID-19 pandemic.
- 2021: Coconut Shores area opens in Soak City with Lighthouse Landing and Sand Dune Lagoon, replacing Big Wave Bay and Soak City Splash House.
- 2022: Tumbili coaster replaces The Crypt. Avalanche renamed Reptilian and Scrambler renamed Arachnidia.
- 2023: Year Round operations start; Grizzly retracked. Gran Prix Raceway (Go karts) close.
- 2024: Year Round operations end. Intimidator 305 renamed to Project 305. Anaconda, Berserker, Joe Cools Driving School, and Peanuts Road Rally retires following the 2024 season.
- 2025: Rapterra opens, replacing Volcano: The Blast Coaster. Project 305 renamed Pantherian. Winterfest is canceled.

== Retired rides and attractions ==
=== Former roller coasters ===
Roller coasters	Manufacturer	Type	Opening year	Closing year
Galaxi	SDC	Steel	1975	1983
King Cobra	Schwarzkopf	Steel - Shuttle Loop	1977	1986
Hypersonic XLC	S&S Power	Steel-Launched	2001	2007
Shockwave	TOGO	Steel – Stand-up	1986	2015
Hurler	International Coasters, Inc.	Wooden	1994	2015
Volcano: The Blast Coaster	Intamin	Steel-Inverted-Launched	1998	2018
Anaconda	Arrow Dynamics	Custom Looping Coaster	1991	2024

=== Other rides ===
- 1974–1993: Lion Country Safari
- 1975–1983: Adam's Apple/Vertigo (Himalaya ride)
- 1975–1984: Flying Carpets
- 1975–1995: Old Dominion Line (steam train)
- 1975–1995: Sky Ride (two entrances, one next to the Racer 75 and one in (Planet Snoopy)Hanna-Barbera Land; one entrance still stands)
- 1975–1988: Bad Apple (Monster)
- 1975–2011: Yogi's Cave (renamed and rethemed later, did not open in 2012 and was demolished after the season was over, replaced by Snoopy's Junction)
- 1976–1993: Apple Turnover (Enterprise ride next to Lake Charles)
- 1976–1990: Mt. Kilimanjaro (Bayern Kurve)
- 1976–1983: Flying Bobs
- 1979–1980: Lost World Mountain: Journey to Atlantis (replaced by Haunted River)
- 1979–1995: Lost World Mountain: The Time Shaft
- 1979–1983: Lost World Mountain: Journey to the Land of Dooz
- 1980–1995: Lost World Mountain: The Haunted River
- 1984–1993: Smurf Mountain
- 1985–2002: Diamond Falls (shoot the chute) (located where Backlot Stunt Coaster sits)
- 1986–1996: Fred's Jungle Gym (children's play area)
- 1987–1996: Racing Rivers (waterslide complex)
- 1989–1998: Sky Pilot (Located near Racer 75 in Candy Apple Grove)
- 1992–2004: Kiddie Cove (children's area of WaterWorks(Soak City))
- 1992–2007: Spiral Chute (two, body waterslides)
- 1992–2014: Shoot-the-Curl (water slide, demolished to make room for a food stand)
- 1995–2012: Snoopy's Splash Dance (formerly Nickelodeon Green Slime Zone)
- 1997–2012: KidZville (This section became part of Planet Snoopy in 2013.)
- 1998–2019: Soak City Splash House (children's water play area; replaced by Lighthouse Landing)
- 1999–2019: Big Wave Bay (wave pool)
- 2005–2019: The Crypt (HUSS Park Attractions Top Spin) (replaced by Tumbili in 2022)
- 2007–2017: Tornado (a ProSlide Tornado water slide at Soak City)
- 2009–2011: El Dorado (where the WindSeeker is now located)
- 2010–2016: Snoopy's Moon Bounce (replaced by Sally's Sea Plane)
- 2012–2018: Dinosaurs Alive! (animatronic dinosaur walkthrough)
- 1995–2023: Gran Prix Raceway
- 1984–2025: Berserker (looping starship)
- 2000–2024: Joe Cools Driving School
- 1990–2024: Peanuts Road Rally
- 1996–2025: Xtreme Skyflyer

== Kings Dominion logos ==
Original Kings Dominion logo used from 1975 to 1992; sometimes used in-park since 2014

Paramount's Kings Dominion Logo used from 1993 to 2003

Paramount's Kings Dominion logo from 2003 to 2006

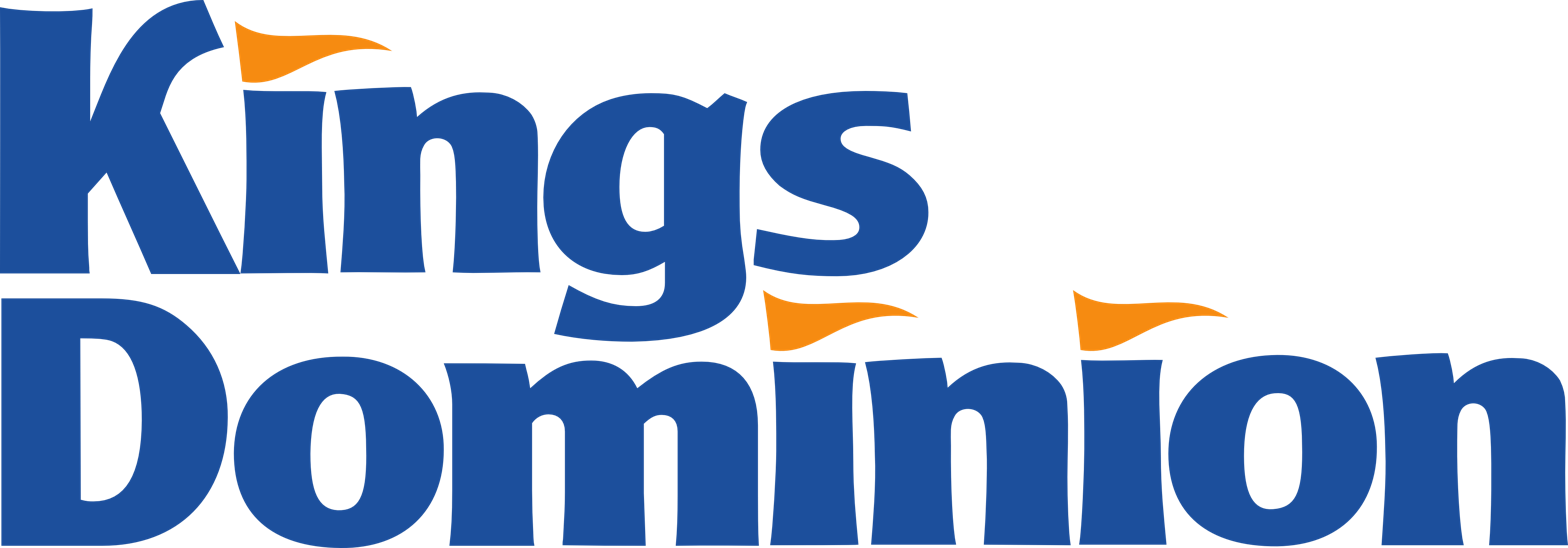
Logo used briefly in 2007 after the switch from Paramount Parks

Kings Dominion 2008–present

== In popular culture ==
Parts of the 1977 film Rollercoaster were filmed at Kings Dominion, and the park was involved in a major part of the film's plot.

== See also ==
- Incidents at Kings Dominion
