= Backlot Stunt Coaster =

Amusement ride

- Previously known as Italian Job: Stunt Track (Kings Island and Canada's Wonderland); Italian Job: Turbo Coaster (Kings Dominion)
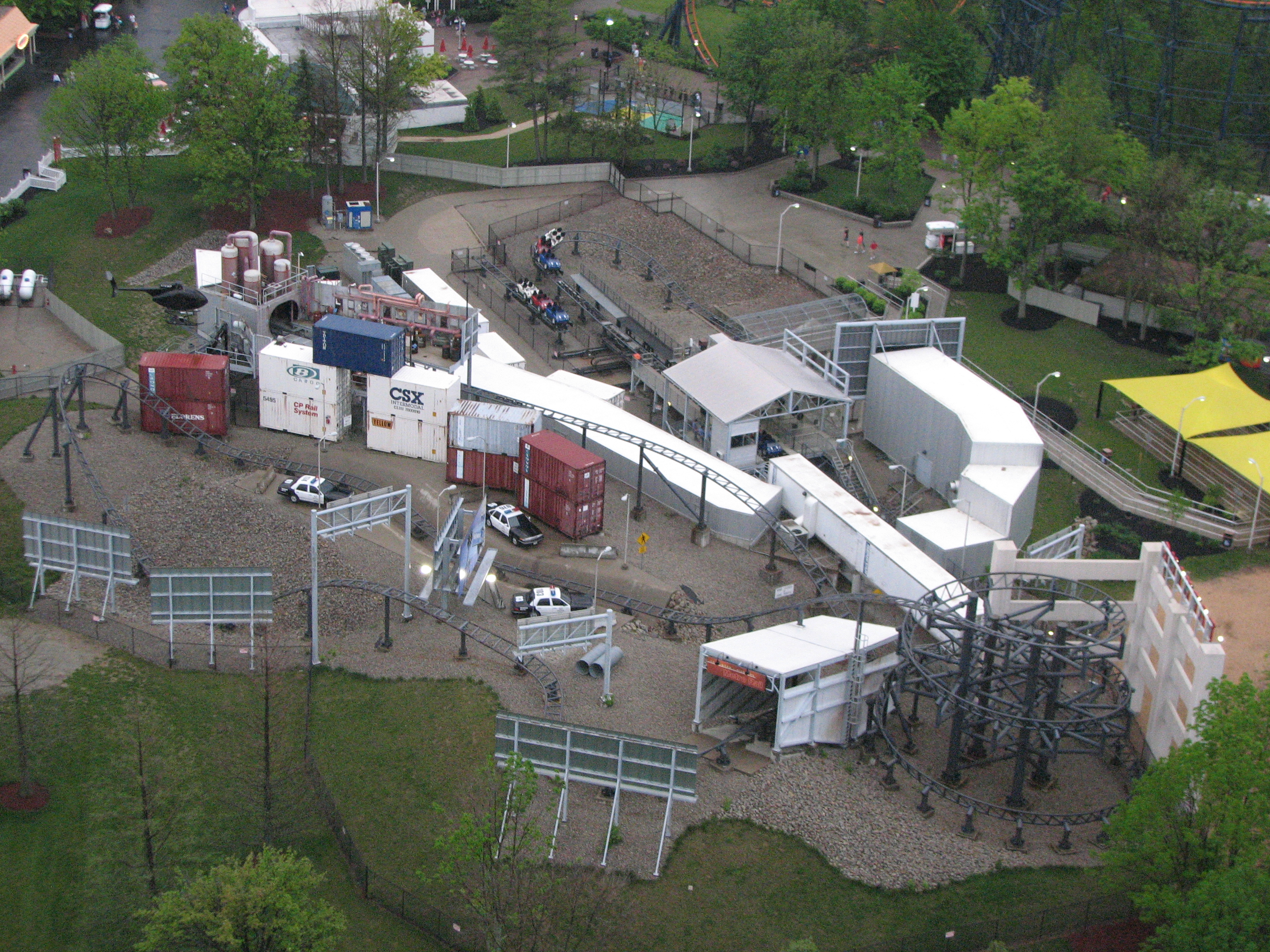
- View of Queen City Stunt Coaster at Kings Island from the Eiffel Tower

Canada's Wonderland
- Park section: Action Zone
- Coordinates: 43°50′19.36″N 79°32′28.25″W
- Status: Operating
- Opening date: May 1, 2005

Kings Dominion
- Park section: Jungle X-Pedition
- Coordinates: 37°50′18.24″N 77°26′31.92″W
- Status: Operating
- Opening date: May 27, 2006
- Replaced: Diamond Falls
- Backlot Stunt Coaster at Kings Dominion at RCDB

Kings Island
- Name: Queen City Stunt Coaster
- Park section: Coney Mall
- Coordinates: 39°20′30.12″N 84°15′56.88″W
- Status: Operating
- Soft opening date: April 29, 2005
- Opening date: May 20, 2005
- Replaced: Les Taxis; Ohio Overland Auto Livery
- Backlot Stunt Coaster at Kings Island at RCDB

General statistics
- Type: Steel – Launched
- Manufacturer: Premier Rides
- Designer: Werner Stengel
- Lift/launch system: LIM Launch Track
- Height: 45.2 ft (13.8 m)
- Drop: 31.2 ft (9.5 m)
- Length: 1,960 ft (600 m)
- Speed: 40 mph (64 km/h)
- Inversions: 0
- Duration: 1:04
- Capacity: 1000 riders per hour
- Acceleration: 0 to 40 mph (0 to 64 km/h) in 3 seconds
- Height restriction: 48 in (122 cm)
- Trains: 3 trains with 3 cars; riders arranged 2 across in 2 rows for a total of 12 riders per train
- Fast Lane available at all three parks
- Backlot Stunt Coaster at RCDB

Backlot Stunt Coaster is a launched roller coaster located at three Six Flags amusement parks. The first two installations opened at Kings Island and Canada's Wonderland in 2005 under the name Italian Job: Stunt Track, while the third opened at Kings Dominion in 2006 as Italian Job: Turbo Coaster. All three were themed to the climactic chase scene from the 2003 film The Italian Job and were built while the parks were owned by Paramount Parks. Special effects were incorporated throughout each ride to recreate elements of the scene.

Following Cedar Fair's acquisition of the parks from Paramount, the Italian Job theme was removed, and all three attractions were renamed Backlot Stunt Coaster for the 2008 season. Some of the original effects have since been modified or removed. For the 2025 season, the Kings Island version was renamed Queen City Stunt Coaster and re-themed around historic landmarks in Cincinnati.

== History ==
The Italian Job: Stunt Track was announced by Kings Island and Canada's Wonderland on August 12, 2004. It replaced the Lex Taxis antique car ride at Kings Island. The ride opened at Kings Island for previews on April 29, 2005, followed by its grand opening several weeks later on May 20. It opened at Canada's Wonderland on May 1, 2005. On October 12, 2005, Kings Dominion announced they would be adding a clone of Italian Job: Stunt Coaster but with a slightly different name, Italian Job: Turbo Coaster. It opened on May 27, 2006. The ride at Kings Dominion replaced the Diamond Falls shoot-the-chute ride.

At the end of the 2007 season, all three Italian Job coasters were renamed to Backlot Stunt Coaster for the start of the 2008 season. The name change was part of a wider effort by Cedar Fair to remove Paramount themes from the chain of parks the company acquired in 2006 from Paramount Parks. Special effects throughout the ride were modified to remove references to the movie, generalizing the overall theme.

== Ride experience ==
=== Layout ===
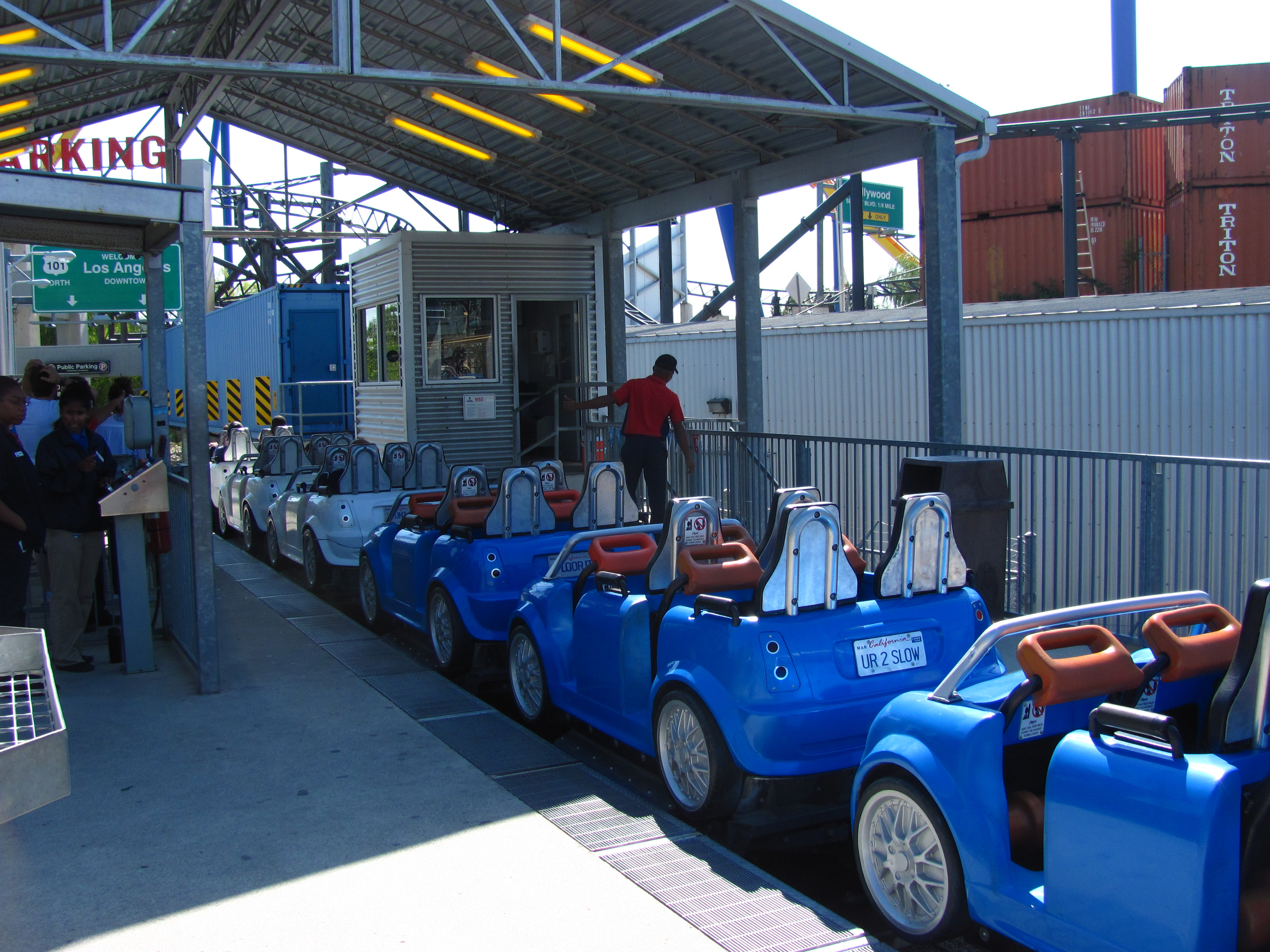
Station at Canada's Wonderland

After accelerating from 0–40 miles per hour (0–64 km/h) in three seconds, out of the station, the train enters into a three-story "parking garage" shell, passing through two upwards helixes meant to mirror the ascension of a car through a true parking garage. The train then drops from the top of the helixes into a "street" lined with highway signs and three police cars, with sirens and lights flashing. Riders then swerve between the police cars. Riders then go through an overbanked turn at 88 degrees, followed by a dip, and then travel down a set of "subway stairs". The train then comes to a halt in front of a tunnel. A helicopter rises to the train's left, shooting simulated gunfire. Under Paramount's operation, the gunfire cracked pipes and barrels, which sprayed "gasoline" (truly, water) all around riders. Though that effect has since been removed, the second round of gunfire still ignites where the gasoline would've splashed, catching two barrels on fire before a gas tank explodes. The train is then launched again into a tunnel, twisting and dropping before coming out of the "broken billboard", splashing down in an L.A. Aqueduct, and turning left into the ride's station.

=== Trains ===
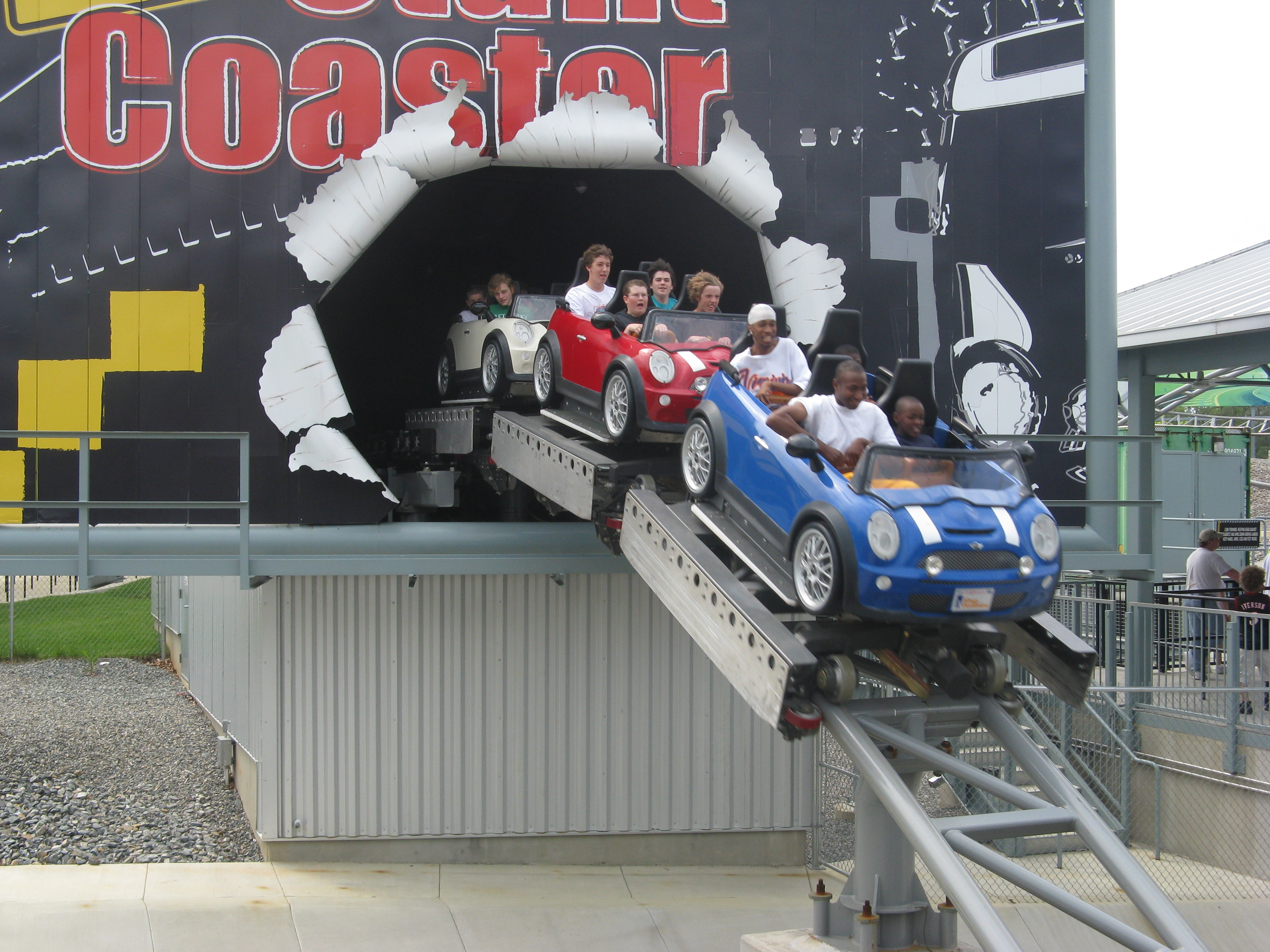
Train designed as a MINI Cooper coming out of the billboard at Kings Dominion

Backlot Stunt Coaster has three trains, each with three cars. Each car can sit four people in two rows of two. Under its original name and theme, the ride featured unique cars that resembled ¾ scale MINI Coopers. Paramount worked closely with BMW to design the cars. The cars had headlight stickers on the front and working doors on the side. Sound effects were also built into the cars. Each train was arranged the same, with the first car being painted blue, the second car being painted red, and the third car being painted white.

Before the 2010 season, the trains were simplified and removed of any resemblance to the MINI Cooper as Cedar Fair no longer held the license to use the MINI Coopers. The arrangement of the car colors on the trains was also changed: One train is all blue, the second is all red and the third is all white.

=== Theme ===
All three had similar themes revolving around the climatic chase scene at the end of the 2003 film, The Italian Job. Special effects were incorporated throughout the ride such as a helicopter that attacks riders with a simulated machine gun sound, pyrotechnics and water effects. Sound recordings of "Action!" and "Cut!" were also heard during launch and final brake run, respectively. The last drop portraying the Mini Coopers jumping out of a sewer featured spraying water jets to simulate a splashdown effect.
