= Anaconda (Kings Dominion) =

Steel roller coaster (1991–2024)

- Anaconda in July 2001

Kings Dominion
- Location: Kings Dominion
- Park section: Jungle X-Pedition
- Coordinates: 37°50′21.23″N 77°26′24.79″W
- Status: Removed
- Opening date: March 23, 1991
- Closing date: November 3, 2024
- Cost: $5,000,000
- Replaced: King Kobra

General statistics
- Type: Steel
- Manufacturer: Arrow Dynamics
- Designer: Ron Toomer
- Model: Custom looping coaster
- Lift/launch system: Chain lift hill
- Height: 128 ft (39 m)
- Drop: 144 ft (44 m)
- Length: 2,700 ft (820 m)
- Speed: 50 mph (80 km/h)
- Inversions: 4
- Duration: 1:50
- Capacity: 1,400 riders per hour
- G-force: 5.1
- Height restriction: 48 in (122 cm)
- Trains: 2 trains with 7 cars; riders arranged 2 across in 2 rows for a total of 28 riders per train
- Anaconda at RCDB

Video

Anaconda was a steel roller coaster located at Kings Dominion, in the Jungle X-Pedition section of the park. Built by Arrow Dynamics and designed by Ron Toomer, Anaconda opened in 1991 as the first looping roller coaster to feature an underwater tunnel and the first at Kings Dominion with more than one inversion.

== History ==
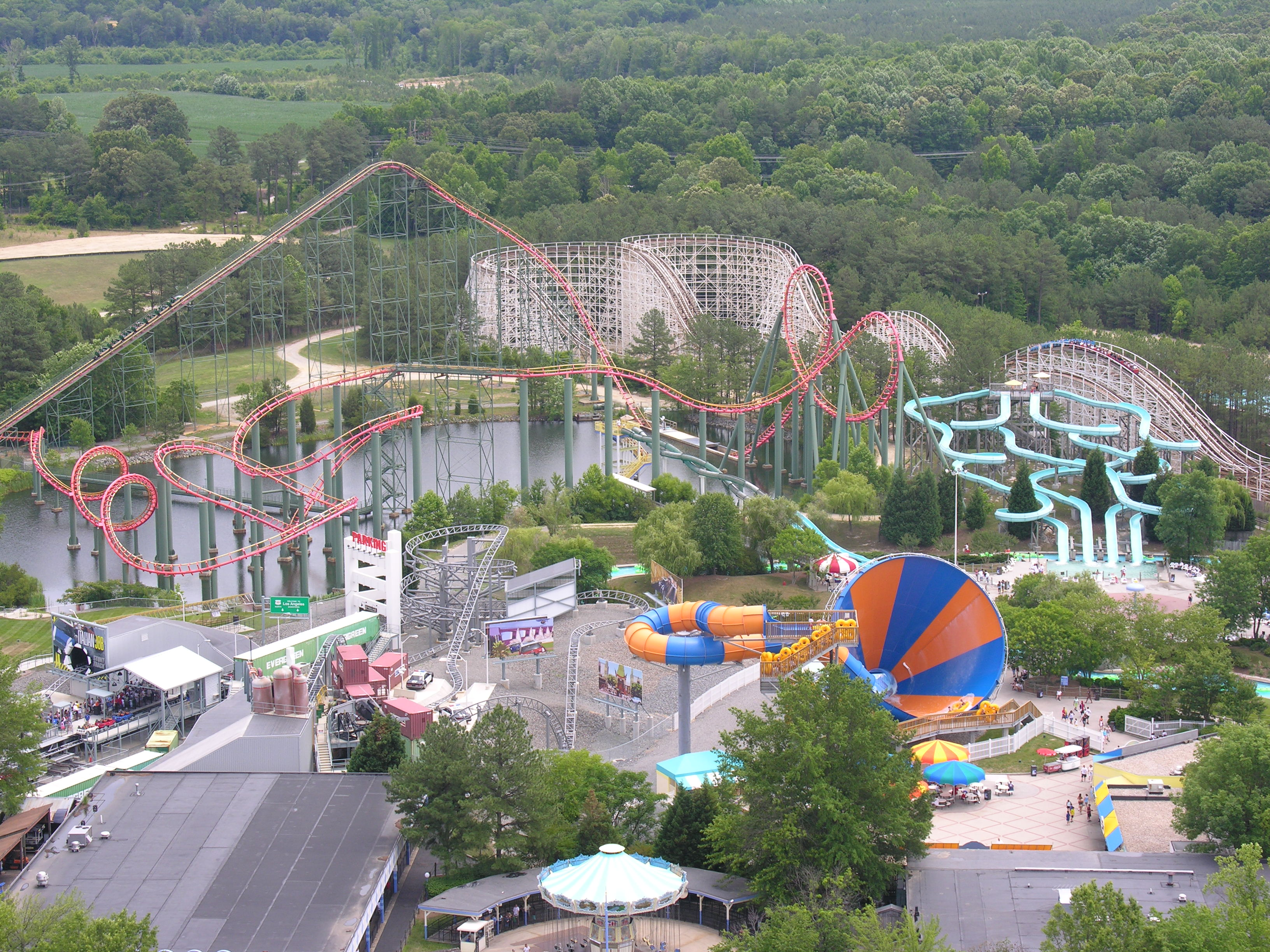
View of Anaconda

Details about a new roller coaster called Anaconda, set to debut in 1991, were reported in September 1990. The park's Lake Charles was chosen as the site for Anaconda. Arrow Dynamics would design the coaster to incorporate an underwater tunnel and put the majority of the ride over water. Construction began towards the end of the 1990 park season, with elements of the lift hill constructed over the former site of King Kobra, a weight drop Anton Schwarzkopf Shuttle Loop removed in 1987. Anaconda opened to the public on March 23, 1991.

On December 24, 2024, documentation regarding the demolition of Anaconda was discovered by fans online. KDFans found an excerpt of the public record regarding the demolition. A week later on December 27, a park spokesperson confirmed that the coaster would be removed.

Demolition began January 2025 after WinterFest ended, and the coaster was fully removed by the park’s opening in March. The lake was kept intact, but all remains of the coaster were removed.

== Ride experience ==
The train left the station climbing the 128-foot (39 m) lift hill. From there riders plunged 144 feet (44 m) twisting to the right and entered a 126-foot (38 m) underwater tunnel. The train exited the tunnel, entering a 100-foot (30 m) vertical loop followed by a 90-foot (27 m) sidewinder inversion (a half loop that used a corkscrew at the top to change direction). After a small hill, the train entered the first brake run nearly slowing to a complete stop.

The second part of the ride began with a butterfly figure-eight element consisted of sharp twists and turns. The last turn to the right transitioned the train into a 25-foot (7.6 m) double corkscrew above the water. Immediately following was a small bunny hill with a short dive under the lift hill that turned to the left into the final brake run. After a U-turn, the train returned to the station.
