= Paramount Parks =

Former amusement park subsidiary of CBS Corporation

Paramount Parks, Inc.
- Final Logo used from 2002 to 2006
- Type: Subsidiary
- Industry: Theme parks
- Founded: August 17, 1992; 34 years ago
- Defunct: June 30, 2006; 20 years ago
- Fate: Acquired by Cedar Fair
- Successor: Cedar Fair
- Headquarters: Charlotte, North Carolina, US
- Number of locations: 7 (2006)
- Key people: Alexander Weber Jr. (CEO)
- Revenue: $0.42 billion (2005)
- Operating income: $0.24 billion (2005)
- Owner: National Amusements
- Parent: Paramount Communications (1992–1994); Viacom (1994–2005); CBS Corporation (2005–2006)
- Footnotes; Financials as of December 31, 2005.

Paramount Parks, Inc. was an American amusement park company headquartered in Charlotte, North Carolina, United States. It was a subsidiary of the mass media company CBS Corporation, majority owned by National Amusements. Formed in 1992 through the acquisition of Kings Entertainment Company by Paramount Communications, it was the fourth-largest amusement park operator in the United States, hosting approximately 12 million visitors annually. Paramount Parks operated seven properties, including six amusement parks and one attraction.

The subsidiary became a part of Viacom after the latter acquired Paramount Communications in 1994. When Viacom split in 2005, Paramount Parks was reorganized under CBS Corporation, and the following year, CBS Corporation sold all Paramount Parks' assets to Cedar Fair for $1.24 billion. Cedar Fair later merged with Six Flags in 2024.

== History ==
In 1984, the Taft Broadcasting Company sold three of its four amusement parks to the newly-formed Kings Entertainment Company (KECO) for $167.5 million. Kings Island, Kings Dominion, and Carowinds were included in the sale. KECO consisted of senior-level managers and executives, led by Nelson Schwab III, that formerly managed Taft Broadcasting's amusement park division, Taft's Attractions Group. In 1987, Kings Island was sold individually to Carl Lindner's American Financial Corporation. KECO purchased Great America in 1989 from the city of Santa Clara, California, and it also owned a 20-percent stake in Canada's Wonderland.

Paramount Communications, previously known as Gulf+Western, entered discussions with KECO in April 1992 to purchase the company. The sale was completed by August 1992, which was part of a larger $400 million transaction that included the purchase of Kings Island from American Financial. Paramount, which did not have any prior amusement park experience, became the fourth-largest park operator in the country. KECO Chairman and CEO Nelson Schwab retained his roles following the acquisition. Paramount also bought out the remaining 80-percent ownership stake in Canada's Wonderland in 1993, raising their portfolio to five parks.

The parks were part of Viacom's Blockbuster Entertainment division until 2002 when they were moved back to Paramount Pictures. After another Viacom corporate shuffle in 2004 the parks became part of Viacom Recreation, a division of Nickelodeon and MTV Networks.

On December 31, 2005, as Viacom went through a corporate split (creating a new version of Viacom and renaming the original company CBS Corporation), Paramount Parks was assigned to CBS Corporation. CBS Corporation, in order to "toss overboard" any unnecessary company assets, sought to sell the parks during the 2006 season, planning to continue their operation until a buyer was found. Cedar Fair, owners of more well known Cedar Point and Knott's Berry Farm theme parks approached the company in 2006. Within the acquisition, there was a license for ten years of use of the Paramount prefix on the parks and Paramount properties at the former Paramount parks, and a four-year license for the use of Nickelodeon names and properties. Cedar Fair opted to remove all mentions of Paramount and Paramount intellectual properties by mid-2007. The only references to a Viacom property remaining were the characters and titles used in Nickelodeon Universe (Kings Island) and Nickelodeon Central (Kings Dominion, Carowinds, Great America, and Canada's Wonderland), all of which were rethemed to Peanuts for the 2010 season, to match the children's areas of Cedar Fair's other parks.

== Properties ==
The following properties refer to all properties that operated upon Paramount Parks' dissolution on June 30, 2006.

=== Amusement parks ===
- Paramount Canada's Wonderland — Vaughan, Ontario
- Paramount's Carowinds — Charlotte, North Carolina
- Paramount's Great America — Santa Clara, California
- Paramount's Kings Dominion — Doswell, Virginia
- Paramount's Kings Island — Mason, Ohio
- Bonfante Gardens — Gilroy, California

=== Water parks ===
- Boomerang Bay — Paramount's Great America
- Boomerang Bay — Paramount's Carowinds
- Boomerang Bay — Paramount's Kings Island
- Splash Works — Paramount Canada's Wonderland
- WaterWorks — Paramount's Kings Dominion

=== Other attractions ===
- Star Trek: The Experience (Las Vegas, Nevada) (closed)

=== Former properties ===
The following former properties refer to properties that were sold by Paramount Parks prior to its 2006 dissolution.

- Terra Mítica: A Paramount Park (Benidorm, Valencian Community, Spain)
- Raging Waters (San Dimas, California); bought by Ogden Corporation in 1999

== Acquisitions ==
The Paramount Parks were not built by Paramount, but rather were pre-existing and purchased as a whole, rebranded with the Paramount name. Effectively, it seems, Paramount was attempting to enter into the movie-based theme-park business popularized by amusement park and resort companies, such as Walt Disney Parks and Resorts, SeaWorld Parks & Entertainment, Six Flags Theme Parks, Cedar Fair and Universal Destinations & Experiences.

In the 1970s and 1980s, Taft Broadcasting created a division called KECO Entertainment (King's Entertainment Company), which was formed in order to build theme parks nationwide. In 1972 and 1975, KECO built Kings Island and Kings Dominion respectively. In 1975, KECO led a forced purchase on the Carowinds Corporation, a bankrupt company, leaving them no choice but to sell Carowinds theme park in Charlotte, North Carolina. In 1981, KECO opened Canada's Wonderland in Vaughan, Ontario, Canada.

In 1984, hotel company Marriott, owner of two parks named Great America, was looking to divest itself of its parks. One of the parks was located in Silicon Valley in the exurbs of San Francisco and the other was located in the North Shore suburbs of Chicago. The California park was purchased by KECO, while the Illinois Park became part of the Six Flags chain.

In 1992, after 22 years of international operations, KECO Entertainment sold five of their parks to Paramount Communications (which was later purchased by Viacom). The remaining property, Australia's Wonderland, was not fully owned by Kings Entertainment and the minor stake they owned was sold to various Australian investor groups as the stake was not opted to be purchased by Paramount. Subsequently, in 1993, the "Paramount's" prefix was added to the parks, excluding Canada's Wonderland, which was renamed to "Paramount Canada's Wonderland", to avoid the use of a double possessive noun. Thus, the first five parks of the Paramount Parks were established: Paramount's Kings Island, Paramount's Kings Dominion, Paramount's Great America, Paramount's Carowinds, and Paramount Canada's Wonderland.

In 2000, Paramount Parks purchased the majority of shares in Spanish theme park Terra Mitica (Land of Myth), branding it Terra Mitica: A Paramount Park. In 2004, Viacom dropped its shares in the park, and the name was reverted without the Paramount suffix.

== Theme ==
In contrast to their predecessors, Paramount Parks introduced more elaborate theming to its rides and attractions, a practice typically associated with major theme parks like Walt Disney World. Rides such as Tomb Raider: The Ride and The Italian Job: Stunt Track at Kings Island were indoor, highly themed, immersive rides with synchronized musical scores and Hollywood special effects.

Following Cedar Fair's purchase of the Paramount Parks' properties, each park began removing Paramount branding from their rides and attractions. In many cases, this only required a name change, although heavily themed rides would need to undergo more significant changes to remove special effects, including musical scores that would play during the ride or in ride queues.

- Drop Zone: Stunt Tower was renamed Drop Tower at all five former Paramount parks.
- Top Gun was renamed Afterburn at Carowinds and Flight Deck at Canada's Wonderland, California's Great America, and Kings Island (the latter was later renamed again to The Bat).
- Face/Off at Kings Island was renamed Invertigo.
- The Italian Job: Stunt Track at Canada's Wonderland, Kings Dominion, and Kings Island were all renamed Backlot Stunt Coaster.
- Tomb Raider: The Ride at Kings Island and Tomb Raider: FireFall at Kings Dominion were both renamed The Crypt. Both were eventually removed altogether.
  - The roller coaster at Canada's Wonderland that was named Tomb Raider: The Ride was renamed Time Warp.
- The go-kart rides named Days of Thunder were renamed Thunder Alley.
- Paramount Action-FX Theater was renamed Action Theater.
- The Paramount Theatre was renamed to the park name in which it resided. At Kings Island, for example, it became Kings Island Theatre.
- BORG Assimilator at Carowinds was renamed Nighthawk.
- Cliffhanger at Canada's Wonderland was renamed Riptide.
- Scooby Doo and the Haunted Mansion at Canada's Wonderland, Carowinds, Kings Dominion and Kings Island were all renamed Boo Blasters on Boo Hill completely removing the Scooby Doo theme.
- The Nickelodeon and Hanna-Barbera children's areas in all of the parks remained intact until after the 2009 season, when they were renamed Planet Snoopy, themed to Charles "Sparky" Schulz's Peanuts characters.
- There were two Wayne's World themed lands at Kings Dominion and Carowinds. While Hurler continues to operate at Carowinds, its Kings Dominion counterpart was rebuilt by Rocky Mountain Construction and reopened in 2018 as Twisted Timbers.

One of the most notable changes happened to Kings Island's $20 million indoor Tomb Raider: The Ride, which needed to have its special effects removed, including its highly themed pre-show based on the film. In addition, its water effects, lasers, Hollywood lighting, musical score, artificial fog, and flame effects were all removed and not replaced. On the other hand, The Crypt at Kings Dominion, which was more lightly themed to the film, retained many of its effects including lighting, fog, and flames.
