= The Crypt (Kings Island) =

Amusement ride

- The sign outside The Crypt at Kings Island

Kings Island
- Name: Tomb Raider: The Ride (2002-2007); The Crypt (2008-2011)
- Area: Rivertown
- Coordinates: 39.3402°N 84.2671°W
- Status: Removed
- Cost: Approx $20,000,000
- Opening date: April 5, 2002
- Closing date: October 30, 2011
- Replaced: Kenton's Cove Keelboat Canal
- Replaced by: Madame Fatale's Cavern of Terror (2012-2024) ; The Conjuring: Beyond Fear (2025-present)

Ride statistics
- Attraction type: Giant Top Spin
- Manufacturer: HUSS Park Attractions
- Height: 80 ft (24 m)
- Drop: 70 ft (21 m)
- Speed: 13 rpm
- G-force: 4.3
- Participants per group: 77 (2002-06); 47 (2007-2011)
- Duration: Approximately 1 minute and 10 seconds
- Height restriction: 54 in (137 cm)

The Crypt was an indoor Giant Top Spin ride located at Kings Island in Mason, Ohio. Former park owner Paramount Parks collaborated with HUSS Park Attractions to design and manufacture the ride, which opened as Tomb Raider: The Ride on April 5, 2002. The flat ride featured a variety of special effects that correlated with the theme of the 2001 film Lara Croft: Tomb Raider from Paramount Pictures. Under new ownership by Cedar Fair, Kings Island removed all references to the film from both the ride and its indoor queue line following the 2007 season. It reopened as The Crypt in 2008. An outdoor, smaller version of the ride opened at sister park Kings Dominion in 2005 as Tomb Raider: FireFall and closed in 2019.

== History ==
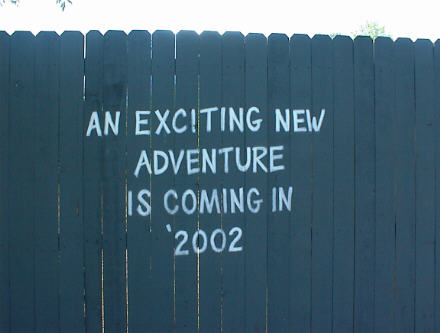
Tomb Raider: The Ride Teaser

During the 2000 season, Kenton's Cove Keelboat Canal, a log flume water ride, gave its last ride. For the beginning of the 2001 season, the area around Kenton's Cove Keelboat Canal was fenced in, with the phrase, "An exciting new adventure is coming in 2002" written along the fence. Paramount's Kings Island officially announced Tomb Raider: The Ride on July 2, 2001, by placing the 17-foot-tall (5.2 m) Hindu goddess Brahma prop used in the first movie (and later, in the ride's pre-show) in front of the park's Eiffel Tower and Royal Fountains. After the Paramount Parks were sold to Cedar Fair and all licensing rights were dropped, the rides within the park continued to operate with the Paramount movie names for the 2007 season. However, on January 21, 2008, Kings Island's main web site replaced the name Tomb Raider: The Ride with The Crypt.

The ride cost approximately $20 million to build, making it one of the most expensive rides the park has ever constructed. The Crypt was the world's first and only Giant Top Spin, performing two inversions in a cycle that lasted 1:10.

== Ride experience ==
=== Tomb Raider: The Ride (2002–2007) ===
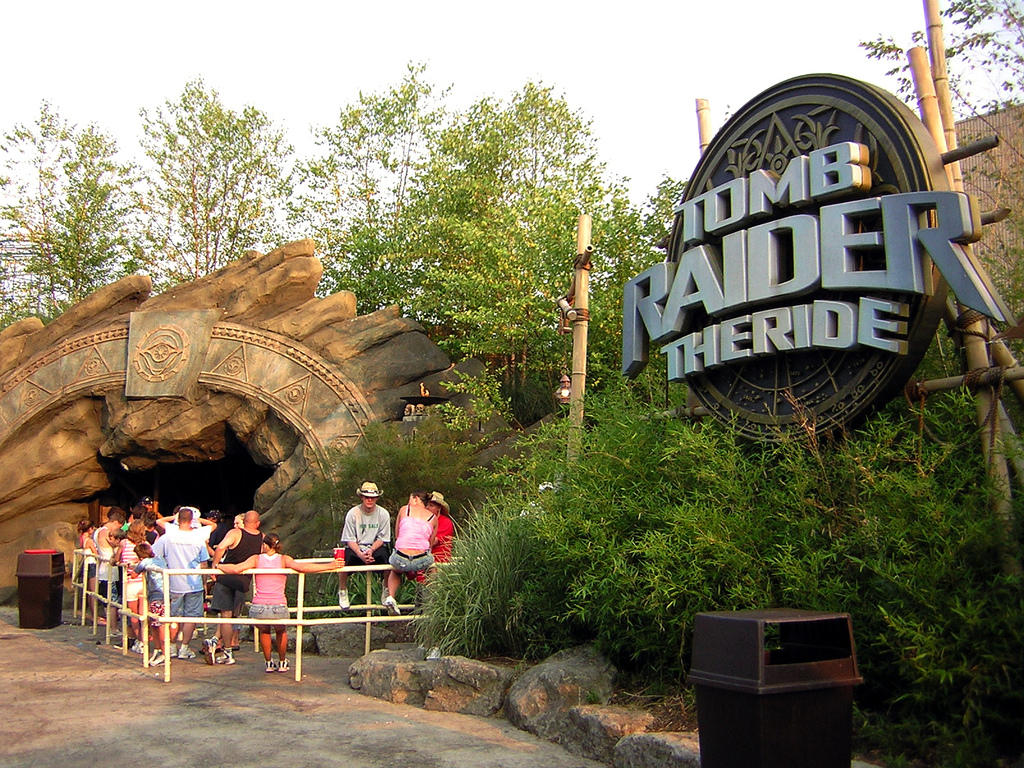
The entrance and queue line when it was known as Tomb Raider: The Ride

In the attraction's Tomb Raider: The Ride incarnation, the attraction's entry plaza featured a special edition Land Rover Defender parked by the ride's entrance to represent Lara Croft's presence at the site. Atmospheric music (some sampling the movie's score) played throughout the plaza and into the queue. Upon entering the building, guests found themselves walking on catwalks over artifacts and rubble while passing under ceilings supported by a seemingly temporary bamboo structure. A large antechamber, featuring large stone monkey warrior statues from the film, sectioned off one cycle's worth of guests into three rows. As the ride's original score intensified, ancient gears could be heard tumbling into place as a light aligned to illuminate the Triangle of Light featured on the elaborately carved door located in front of riders. Once the light is aligned, the door began to slide open with accompanying sound and fog effects, allowing guests to enter the pre-show room. Once in the pre-show area, the door would slide closed.

The pre-show room featured the statue of Brahma used in the film and a large oval projection screen that raised out of the altar beneath the statue. A video played to explain the foundation of Lara Croft: Tomb Raider, establishing the ride's storyline to be centered around the Triangle of Light, an ancient artifact capable of controlling time, which is sought by Croft in the film. Once the pre-show video had ended, the entire left wall of the room rose, revealing the "secret" entrance to the sixty-foot-tall altar chamber of the god Shiva and allowing riders to board the vehicle, maintaining the same rows from the prior room.

The ride featured an original soundtrack composed by Rob Pottorf, sound effects from The Bakery, and voiceovers from Angelina Jolie, along with other members of the film's cast.

The ride lifted riders up toward the eyes of a carving of Shiva on the forward wall. His eyes (embedded with automated lights) scanned the car, and fire and ice emblems held in two of his six hands illuminated. The ride then flipped through the darkness before stopping with riders looking straight up at razor-sharp icy stalactites on the ceiling. It released, flipped again, and came to a stop, holding riders looking straight down on "lava pits", pools of water cascading from a massive volcano behind the loading platform that stretched up the chamber's back wall. In time with the music, the lava would begin to jump up, as fountains narrowly avoided splashing riders.

After another flip through the darkness, the ride circled around the bottom of its arc, looking up at the god on the wall. As fog and lights filled the room, the fire and ice effects went off at once as, in time with the audio track, the god screamed and her fire, ice, and eyes went dark. He appeared to "wake up" once more as one final blast of fog emanated from the base of the ride structure, nearly contacting riders before fading away (this used as a device to keep riders engaged during the ride's lengthy homing procedure before the bridges could lower to allow guests to disembark).

For the majority of its time as Tomb Raider: The Ride, the ride included four inversions, extended "hang time" over the lava pits, a god with piercing eyes and fire and ice emblems, fog effects, and a synchronized musical score composed specifically for the ride, lasting 2:30.

=== The Crypt (2008–2011) ===
In June 2006, Cedar Fair Entertainment Company purchased all five Paramount Parks from Viacom. After the 2007 season, the parks removed all references to Paramount and their licensed film properties from rides and attractions. At Kings Island, this led to a change in the name of Tomb Raider: The Ride which became The Crypt.

The name change coincided with a change in theme, as many film aspects of the original ride were removed. The Shiva goddess statue in the Heart of the Tomb, a feature in the line queue, was painted over. The ride's water and fog effects were also removed. The Giant Top Spin's 77-seat gondola was reduced in size with the removal of the first row of seats, reducing the capacity by one third. The ride performed a nine-inversion cycle like its sister ride at Kings Dominion for the 2008 season and for a month of the 2009 season. Beginning in 2009, the ride was reprogrammed to perform a less intensive cycle with only two inversions – half the number previously performed when it was known as Tomb Raider: The Ride.

The Crypt was changed and updated several more times over the years. Following its operation in 2008 with a techno soundtrack in complete darkness, the soundtrack was changed to howling wind and beating drums. Gradually, more of the theatrical lighting used on Tomb Raider: The Ride returned to the ride. The queue line, which had its Tomb Raider: The Ride musical score removed earlier, began playing an album of atmospheric music from the Midnight Syndicate until 2011, when both the queue and ride were outfitted with music from the score of the 2010 film Inception. Also in 2011, new lighting and props were added to the queue line, and manual doors were retrofitted in place of the original "vault door" that would raise and lower to let riders in. In the middle of the season, the red, amber, and yellow underwater lights that formerly illuminated the "lava pit" were turned back on, and would stay illuminated throughout the ride. In addition, blue lights were installed on the goddess statue and would begin flashing as the gondola reversed direction halfway through the ride cycle.

The Crypt gave its last ride October 30, 2011. The following year on January 20, 2012, The Crypt was removed from the park's website without explanation. Park officials confirmed the following month on Twitter that The Crypt "has reached the end of its service life", and that it would "be replaced by an all-new Halloween Haunt experience".

=== Halloween Haunt Attraction (2012–present) ===
The Crypt has been transformed into Madame Fatale's Cavern of Terror. This attraction was themed to a museum of oddities and wax. It was removed following the 2024 Halloween season.

In 2025, Kings Island debuted a new maze attraction, themed to The Conjuring Universe media franchise, named The Conjuring: Beyond Fear, in the building.

== Design ==
The show elements for Tomb Raider: The Ride were designed by Technifex, a special effects company specializing in themed entertainment. Scenic design was handled by Weber Group with lighting designed by Visual Terrain. The soundtrack was composed by Rob Pottorf of RPMusic while The Bakery handled sound design.

The Travel Channel aired a behind-the-scenes special dedicated to the mechanics and story of the original ride.

The Crypt was a higher-capacity version of the highly popular smaller Top Spin located at many amusement parks. Initially, Tomb Raider: The Ride accommodated 77 riders. When it was rebranded The Crypt, its capacity was reduced to 46 (by removing the first row of the gondola).

== See also ==
- 2011 in amusement parks
