= Tumbili =

Roller coaster at Kings Dominion

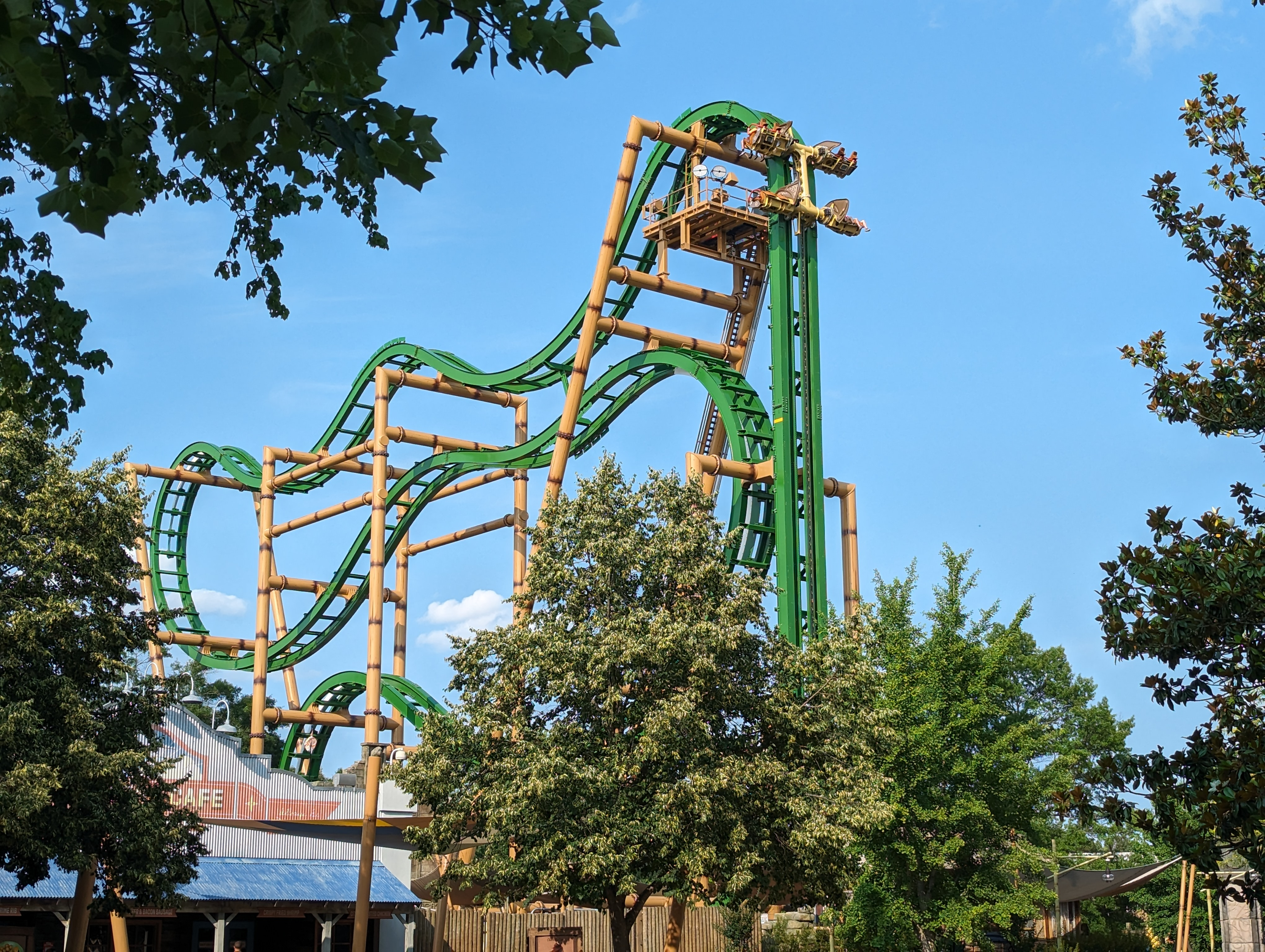

Kings Dominion
- Location: Kings Dominion
- Park section: Jungle X-Pedition
- Coordinates: 37°50′22.5″N 77°26′29.2″W
- Status: Operating
- Opening date: March 12, 2022
- Replaced: The Crypt

General statistics
- Type: Steel – 4th Dimension – Wing Coaster
- Manufacturer: S&S – Sansei Technologies
- Model: 4D Free Spin
- Lift/launch system: Vertical chain lift hill
- Height: 112 ft (34 m)
- Length: 770 ft (230 m)
- Speed: 34 mph (55 km/h)
- Inversions: 0
- Duration: 0:55
- Height restriction: 48–77 in (122–196 cm)
- Website: Official website
- Trains: 2 single car trains with riders arranged 4 across in 2 rows for a total of 8 riders per train
- Fast Lane available
- Tumbili at RCDB

Video

Tumbili (pronounced [tumˈbiˈli]) is a steel roller coaster at Kings Dominion in Doswell, Virginia, United States. Announced in August 2021, the 4D Free Spin model is manufactured by S&S – Sansei Technologies and opened on March 12, 2022. It is located within Jungle X-Pedition, a newly-themed section of the park formerly known as Safari Village. The ride takes its name from the Swahili word for "monkey."

== History ==
In January 2020, Kings Dominion officials announced the removal of The Crypt, a Top Spin ride from HUSS Park Attractions that opened as Tomb Raider: Firefall in 2005. According to Theme Park Tourist, an online amusement park news source, a rumor began circulating in April 2020 that a compact coaster would be replacing The Crypt, and pieces of track were spotted on site by guests in December 2020.

On August 12, 2021, Kings Dominion held an event for media and park guests, officially revealing plans to transform the park's Safari Village section of the park into Jungle X-Pedition for the 2022 season. The area was themed as an archeological research facility, featuring similarly-themed restaurants and retail shops. The centerpiece attraction was announced as a new roller coaster called Tumbili, the expected 4D Free Spin model from S&S – Sansei Technologies. Vice President and General Manager Bridgette Bywater stated, "Riders will want to ride Tumbili again and again because, depending on the weight, position and rider interaction, it provides a different ride experience every time."

The first pieces of track were erected in December 2021, and the final piece was installed on January 19, 2022. Testing of the coaster began in early March. Tumbili officially opened on March 12, 2022, although inclement weather and temperatures only allowed the coaster to dispatch two trains with riders before the park closed early for the day.

== Characteristics ==
Tumbili peaks at a height of 112 feet (34 m) implementing a 90-degree vertical lift hill. Like other FreeSpins, each ride vehicle seats a total of eight riders in two rows, and each row rotates independently of the other, controlled and induced by magnetic technology. Its 770-foot (230 m) track layout is stacked in three layers over a narrow footprint, which sends riders through two beyond-vertical drops known as "raven drops". Tumbili reaches a maximum speed of 34 mph (55 km/h) and lasts about 55 seconds.
