= The Crypt (Kings Dominion) =

Defunct thrill ride at Kings Dominion

Coordinates: 50°47′55.18″N 6°52′53.26″E

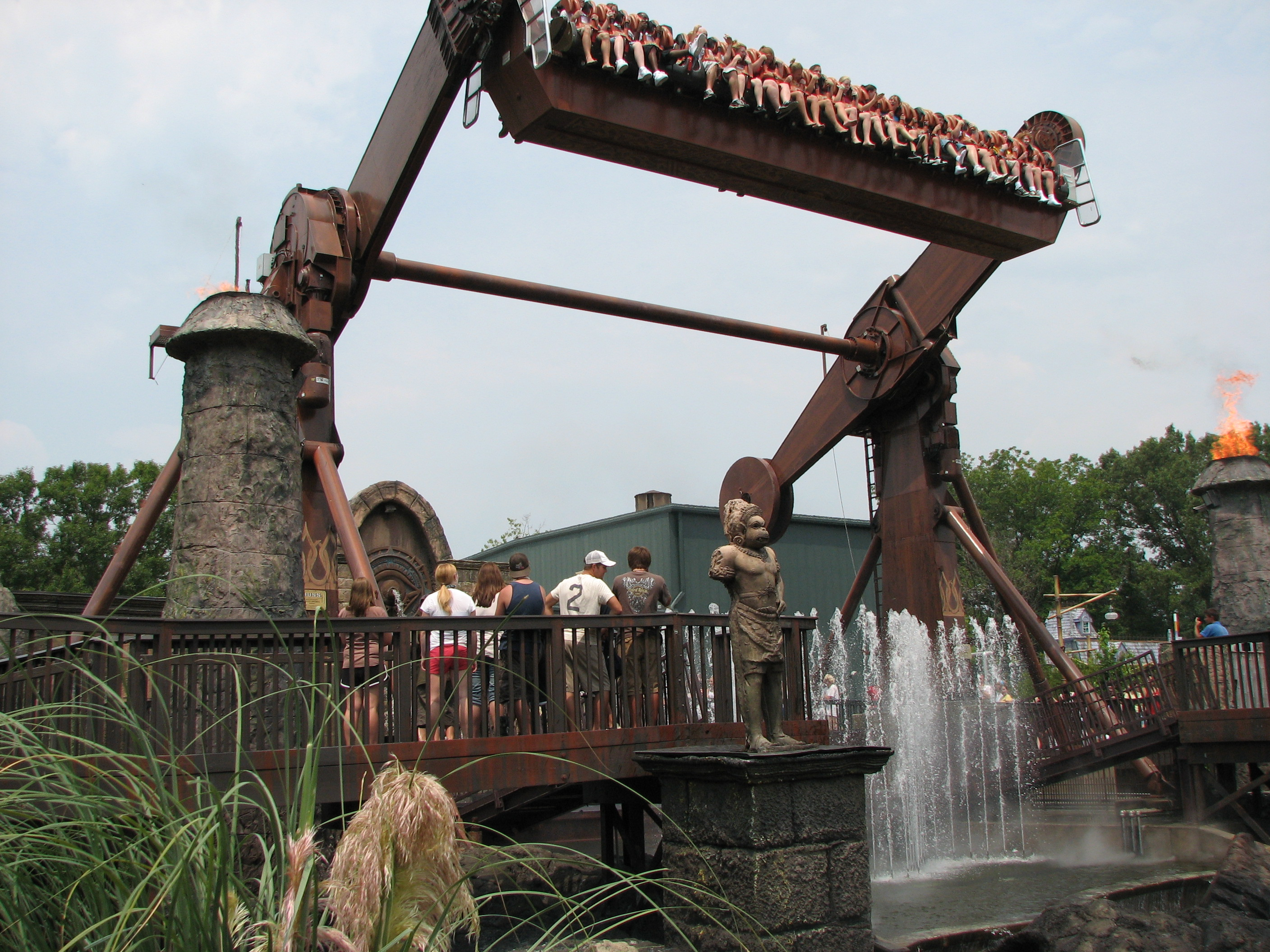
- The Crypt in the middle of a cycle

Kings Dominion
- Area: Safari Village
- Status: Removed
- Opening date: March 19, 2005
- Closing date: 2019
- Replaced by: Tumbili

Ride statistics
- Attraction type: Top Spin
- Manufacturer: HUSS Park Attractions
- Model: Suspended Top Spin
- Height restriction: 54–80 in (137–203 cm)
- Previous names: Tomb Raider: Firefall (2005-2007)

The Crypt, formerly Tomb Raider: Firefall, was a Suspended Top Spin flat ride located at Kings Dominion in Doswell, Virginia. Manufactured by HUSS Park Attractions, the ride opened to the public on March 19, 2005. An indoor version of the ride with heavier theming opened at Kings Island three years earlier as Tomb Raider: The Ride. Both rides were originally themed after Lara Croft: Tomb Raider, a film based on the Tomb Raider video game series and franchise, but all references to the film were removed in 2008 following Cedar Fair's acquisition of the parks in 2006.

== History ==
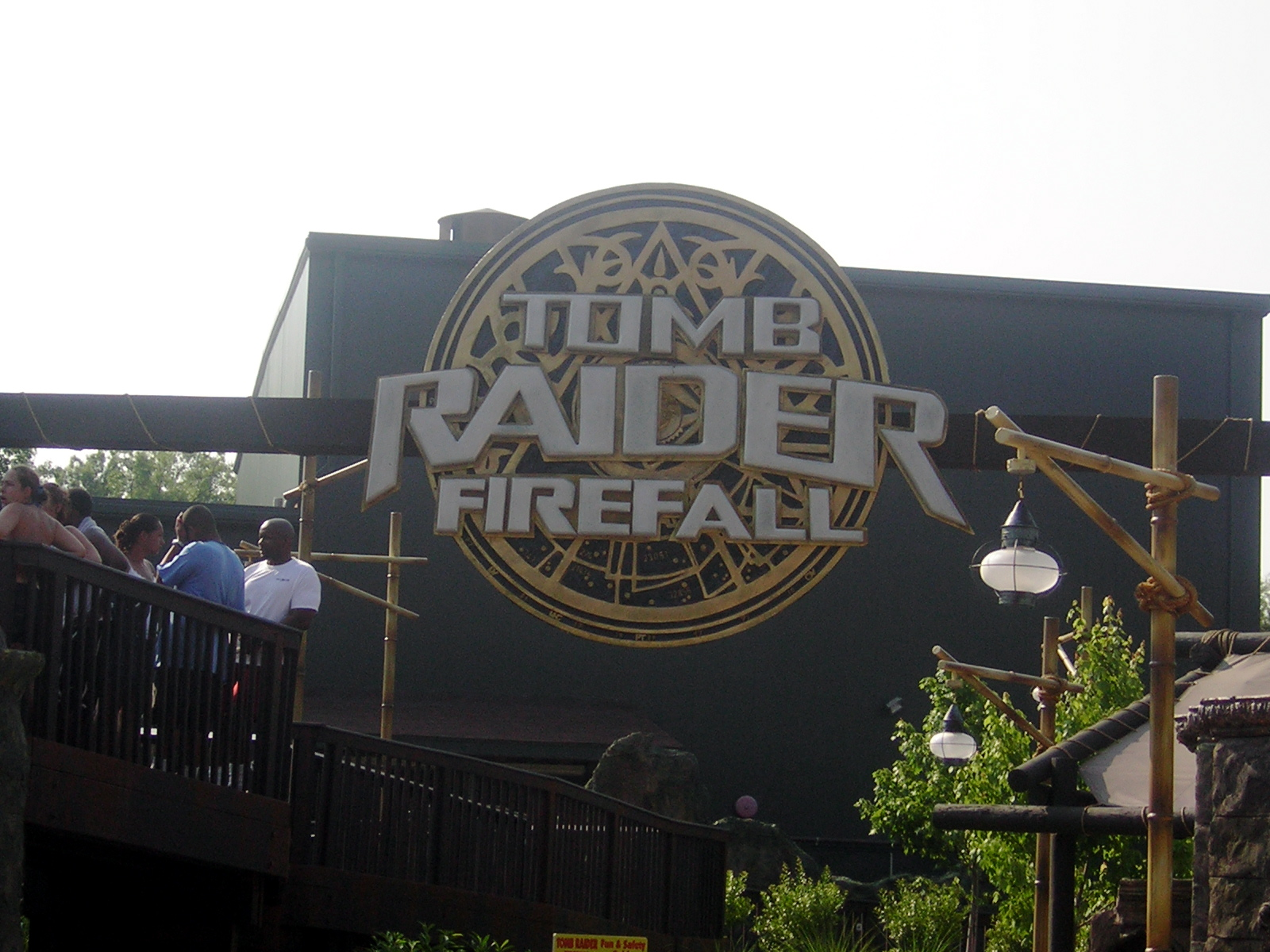
The entrance when it was known as Tomb Raider: Firefall

Kings Dominion announced in 2004 that Tomb Raider: Firefall would be added to the park for the 2005 season. HUSS Park Attractions designed the new ride as a variant of their Top Spin flat ride that they named Suspended Top Spin. The attraction was built near Volcano: The Blast Coaster in the Congo section of the park, and it officially opened on March 19, 2005.

Tomb Raider: Firefall became known as The Crypt for the 2008 season, following modifications that removed all references to Lara Croft: Tomb Raider. On January 23, 2020, Kings Dominion announced the ride would be removed to make room for future development in the Safari Village section of the park. Tumbili, a 4D Free Spin roller coaster, was built in its place for the 2022 season.

== Differences with the Kings Island version ==
- The Kings Island version was a Giant Top Spin, and the only one to ever exist.
- This version was an open area while Kings Island's was indoors.
- The props from Tomb Raider were removed in Kings Island while this version retained the replicated Monkey Warrior statues and the Griffin statues.
- The music, water fountains, fire, and smoke were also retained.

== See also ==
- The Crypt (Kings Island)
