= List of former Kings Island attractions =

This is a list of rides, attractions and themes from Kings Island that no longer exist in the park.

== Former roller coasters ==
Ride	Year opened	Year closed	Manufacturer (Model)	Description	Ref(s)
Bavarian Beetle	1972	1978	SDC (Galaxi)	A steel roller coaster. Stood at 55 feet tall, and had an overall length of 1,700 feet. Originally operated at Coney Island, Cincinnati, Ohio, as Galaxi (1970–1971), and was moved to Kings Island during Oktoberfest of 1971. In June 1978, an appeals court ordered a jury trial in a negligence lawsuit filed by a 91-year-old man who said he broke his neck riding the coaster. The ride suddenly closed in 1978, with no public announcement. The ride was entirely removed by 1979, besides a concrete pad where the ride once stood. Festhaus is currently in this location, and was built on the location in 1982.	
Screamin' Demon	1977	1987	Arrow Development	Also known as The Demon. First looping roller coaster at Kings Island and one of the first in the country to run forwards and backwards through a loop. The ride was sold and relocated to Camden Park in West Virginia where it was renamed to Thunderbolt Express. It last operated there in 1999 and was demolished in November 2004. Congo Falls and Timberwolf are currently in this location.	
The Bat	1981	1983	Arrow Development	Prototype suspended coaster. Although intense, the ride had a fair share of downtime as a result of the designers not banking the track as they did with later suspended coasters. This concept was reintroduced with Top Gun (later renamed Flight Deck) in 1993, which was significantly more reliable. The Bat closed in 1983, remained standing but not operating in 1984, and was demolished in spring 1985. It was replaced with Vortex, the world's first six-looping roller coaster, which opened in 1987. The Bat's name would eventually be reused, as Flight Deck was renamed The Bat for the 2014 season.	
King Cobra	1984	2001	TOGO	Prototype Stand-up roller coaster. It was the first stand up coaster with a loop in the United States. It was removed in 2002 due to TOGO going out of business and finding parts became increasingly difficult. The track and supports were stored on the property until it was scrapped in December 2006. Portions of the ride were sent to Kings Dominion to be used as parts for its sister installation, Shockwave. Delirium, Cargo Loco, and Banshee are currently in this location.	
Vortex	1987	2019	Arrow Dynamics	Constructed at a cost of $4 million on the former location of The Bat, Vortex was a steel roller coaster that opened in the park's Coney Mall area as the world's tallest roller coaster at 148 feet (45 m). It also held the record for most inversions, featuring six. Both records were superseded the following year by Shockwave which opened at Six Flags Great America. After 33 seasons, the ride permanently closed during the 2019 season.	
Scooby's Ghoster Coaster	1998	2005	Caripo (Batflyer)	Prototype suspended roller coaster (billed as the first suspended coaster for kids). The ride had poor capacity and roughness complaints. Removed prior to the 2006 season as a part of the change from Hanna-Barbera Land to Nickelodeon Universe. Surf Dog is currently in this location.	
Son of Beast	2000	2009	Werner Stengel / Roller Coaster Corporation of America	Son of Beast was the first wooden roller coaster with a vertical loop and at the time the only wooden hypercoaster. In response to 27 injuries that occurred on July 9, 2006, Cedar Fair installed lighter trains acquired from the Hurricane: Category 5 roller coaster at the former Myrtle Beach Pavilion and removed the loop in order for the new trains to complete the circuit. It reopened on July 4, 2007, but closed indefinitely on June 23, 2009, following another injury report. Park officials confirmed on March 15, 2010, that they had no plans to reopen the ride. It was removed from Kings Island's park map and the ride list on the official web site in early 2010. After reviewing all options, Kings Island officials announced on July 27, 2012, that Son of Beast would be taken down to allow for more park expansion. The lift hill was demolished on November 20, 2012, at 11:02 a.m. ET. An inverted roller coaster, Banshee, was opened on the former Son of Beast site on April 18, 2014, and the station was used for the Haunt attraction Wolf Pack from 2010-2019. You can now find a gravestone for Son of Beast in the Banshee line.	
Firehawk	2007	2018	Vekoma	A Vekoma Flying Dutchman coaster. Originally known as X-Flight at Geauga Lake from 2001 to 2006, the ride was relocated to Kings Island in an effort to downsize Geauga Lake. The ride reopened at Kings Island the following year under the new name Firehawk. On September 27, 2018, Kings Island announced that it would remove the ride from the park following the 2018 season due to increased downtime and the manufacturer, Vekoma, had stopped supporting the model, causing parts for the ride to become scarce. In August 2019, Kings Island announced that Firehawk would be replaced by Orion in 2020. Orion is now a popular alien-themed roller coaster featuring a 300 ft drop.	

== Former rides ==
Ride	Year	Year closed	Manufacturer (Model)	Description
Boo Blasters on Boo Hill	2010	2025	Sally Dark Rides	A dark ride. Replaced by Phantom Theater: Opening Nightmare in 2026.
Action Theater	1994	2013	Iwerks (Motion Simulator)	Formerly known as Paramount Action F/X Theater (2001-2007). An indoor simulator ride with two mirrored theaters, each with seats that vibrated and moved through quick tilting actions in sync with the film on display. The theater played host to many films, including Days Of Thunder (1994–1997, 2004), James Bond 007: A License to Thrill (1998–2000), 7th Portal (2001–2002), Smash Factory (2001), Meteor Attack (2002), SpongeBob SquarePants 3D (2003–2010), Secrets of the Lost Temple (2003), and Funtastic World of Hanna-Barbera (2006). The theater also played host to films exclusively during the Halloween season, including Elvira's Superstition (2001-2003, 2005–2007), Dracula's Haunted Castle (2004), and Funhouse Express (2005-2006). One of the two theaters was replaced with a haunted house, Urgent Scare, in 2008 and lasted until 2019. In 2022 a haunted house called Hotel St. Michelle replaced Urgent Scare. The other side removed the simulator seats in favor of bench seating in 2011 for the addition of Dinosaurs Alive! 3D. The dinosaur film played for three seasons before closing.
Baba Looey's Buggies	1982	2005	Hodges Hand Cars (Handcars)	Formerly known as Rawhide Railway (1982-1997). Simple handcars on a track that children controlled the speed of, named after the Baba Looey character from The Quick Draw McGraw Show. Removed to make way for the Nickelodeon Universe expansion.
Bayern Kurve	1973	1982	Schwarzkopf (Bayern Kurve)	A high-speed ride in which passengers traveled on a bobsled running around a tight, circular track. Each of the sixteen cars was painted to represent a different country, including Japan, Austria, and Canada. The ride originally included a large marquee with its name and a backdrop depicting alpine mountains, both of which were removed by 1981. Removed after the 1982 season and replaced with King Cobra. The ride was relocated to Australia's Wonderland, where it operated under the name Wizard's Fury from 1985 until it was closed and demolished in 2002. Location was occupied by Slingshot from 2002 to 2021. Now occupied by Cargo Loco.
Boo Boo's Baggage Claim	1972	2005	Ralph E. Chambers Engineering Company (Kiddie Tumble Bug)	Formerly known as Squiddly Diddly (1972-1981) and Jabber Jaw's Tubs (1982-1997). At times referred to as Boo-Boo's Baggage Claim. A miniature version of the classic Tumble Bug ride for children, themed to look like a baggage carousel at an airport. Named after character Boo-Boo Bear from The Yogi Bear Show. Previously named after characters from The Atom Ant/Secret Squirrel Show (Squiddly Diddly) and Jabberjaw. Originally opened at Coney Island in 1967. Removed to make way for the Nickelodeon Universe expansion.
Boo Boo's Buggys	1972	Prior to 1998	Hampton	Formerly known as Motor Mouse (1972-1981) and relocated within park in 1982. At times referred to as Boo-Boo's Buggies. Circular children's ride with cars and motorcycles. Named after character Boo-Boo Bear from The Yogi Bear Show. Previously named after character from Motormouse and Autocat. Originally opened at Coney Island and later relocated back to original park. Removed prior to 1998.
Cuddle Up	1972	1976	Philadelphia Toboggan Company (Cuddle Up)	A spinning flat ride comparable to classic Teacups ride, only with multiple tangent turntables in a straight line. Teacup-shaped vehicles would travel around the circumference of each table and transition from one table to the next. Located in the same building as the original Dodgem attraction. Originally opened at Coney Island in 1930. Replaced with Fascination. Location now home to Coney Bar-B-Que. In 2023 a new type of this ride came in called Cargo Loco.
Der Spinnen Keggers	1972	1989	Intamin (Drunken Barrels)	A spinning flat ride which consisted of eighteen barrel-shaped cars divided between three rotating platforms on a large turntable. The large turntable actuated upward once the ride began, placing all the cars at a slight angle. Each car included a wheel in the center so that passengers could spin it. The outsides of each barrel had different alcoholic beverages listed, including scotch, gin, and rum. The tops of the barrels were removed between 1981 and 1983. The ride was replaced with landscaping after its removal.
Enchanted Voyage	1972	1983	Arrow Development (Boat Ride)	A dark boat ride, akin to Disney's It's a Small World. Riders entered a building shaped like a giant TV set and sailed through several rooms featuring animatronics of new and old Hanna-Barbera characters. A catchy theme song played throughout the ride. In 1984, the ride was re-themed to Smurf's Enchanted Voyage, with all the theming changed but the physical ride remaining the same.
Eurobobbles	2011	2011		A small upcharge attraction where a guest would get in a ball and roll around in a pool of water. Also sat on the former Flight Commander Pad.
Flight Commander	1990	1995	Intamin (Flight Trainer)	A tower with twenty two-person pods that rotated around it. The pods ascended up the tower and the riders had the ability to raise, lower, and invert their pods. On June 9, 1991, a 32-year-old Ohio woman fell to her death from the ride. Investigators determined that a design flaw allowed a rider to slide into an unoccupied seat and become separated from the restraints. The ride remained closed for the remainder of the 1991 season but reopened in 1992. The ride was relocated to Flamingo Land in England, where it was in operation from 1996 to 2004. The area is now home to Kings Mills Antique Autos.
Flying Dutchman	1973	1990	Intamin (Flying Dutchman)	At times referred to as The Shoes. Suspended carousel with 20 shoe-shaped swings that rotated around a tower, approximately 10 feet (3.0 m) off the ground. Prior to construction, Kings Island had considered other themes for the ride vehicles, including flying saucers, automobiles, and kegs. Relocated to Kentucky Kingdom after closure, now called Spring Fling. Replaced with entrance area for Adventure Express. Sol Spin now occupies this spot and Adventure Express line was moved.
Flying Eagles	1972	2004	Bisch-Rocco	A Flying Skooters ride where the suspended passenger tubs would spin around a vertical axis. Removed to make way for Italian Job: Stunt Track (now Queen City Stunt Coaster), then relocated to Carowinds as Mountain Gliders. 3-Point Challenge, a basketball game new in 2006, currently sits where the ride used to be. Originally located where the dodgems stand today and named Flying Scooters (1972–1986). Relocated Coney Island (1972). A new version of this ride opened in 2015 in Camp Snoopy called Franklin’s Flyers.
Gulliver's Rub-A-Dub	1972	1981	Arrow Development	Small water raft ride in Hanna-Barbera Land with a forest animal theme.
Huck's Hotrods	1998	2005		Carousel Car Ride. Relocated to Coney Island (2006–2007)
Halley's Comet	1972	1979		A Round Up style ride. Riders stood up against a metal cage-like wall inside a rapidly rotating "basket". When running, the ride gradually rose up to an angle. Located at the far end of the Coney Island (renamed Coney Mall in 1986).
Kenton's Cove Keelboat Canal	1973	2000	Arrow Development (Hydro Flume)	An elevated log flume with a dual drop and hydro-jump. One of the first in the country to utilize a turntable loading system. It was removed to make room for Tomb Raider: The Ride.
Jetson's Jet Orbiters	1972	2005		Located in Hanna-Barbera Land. Relocated from Coney Island and originally known as Kikki Kangaroo.
Launch Pad	2003, 2006	2003, 2010		An upcharge attraction in which guests where strapped in a harness and would jump on a trampoline. Sat on the former Flight Commander Pad.
Les Taxis	1972	2004	Arrow Development	An antique car ride where guests could drive their own gas-powered car around the track, with help from a guide rail. Also known as Antique Cars. Removed for Queen City Stunt Coaster (formerly Italian Job Stunt Coaster and Backlot Stunt Coaster). A similar ride opened at the park in a different location in 2019.
Lion Country Safari Monorail	1974	1993	Universal Mobility, Inc.	An air-conditioned monorail system in Wild Animal Habitat, now Action Zone, that ran at ground level that allowed guests to view many wild animals. Kings Dominion also operated a similar attraction. The trains were later sold to Jungle Jim's International Market in Fairfield, OH. Son of Beast was later built on part of the site. Known as Wild Animal Safari Monorail (1977–1983) Wild Animal Habitat Monorail (1983–1993)
Maxi Taxi Rides	1980	1983		Live elephant rides available for an additional charge. Replaced with King Cobra.
Ohio Overland Auto Livery	1972	1997	Arrow Development	Another antique car ride, this one intertwined with the previously mentioned Les Taxis. The Auto Livery last operated in 1997, but the ride was not removed until 2004 along with Les Taxis.
Ferris Wheel	1978	1990	Eli Bridge Company (Ferris Wheel)	A ferris wheel with sixteen benches. Added mid-season as a replacement for Bavarian Beetle. Relocated within park in 1982 to accommodate construction of Festhaus. Relocated to Libertyland after removal from park.
Phantom Theater	1992	2002	D. H. Morgan Manufacturing	Dark ride themed by R & R with animatronics by AVG Inc. A behind the scenes tour of an abandoned theater, where phantoms either helped or taunted riders. Used the omnimover system later employed by Boo Blasters on Boo Hill and Phantom Theater: Opening Nightmare.
Pipeline Paradise	1998	2022	WaveLoch Inc.	Artificial wave-surfing environment that provides both curved and straight waves. Known as Wipe-Out Beach (1998–2003). Replaced by RiverRacers water coaster in 2025.
Scooby-Doo and the Haunted Castle	2003	2009	D. H. Morgan Manufacturing	Scooby-Doo themed dark ride. Rethemed as Boo Blasters on Boo Hill as part of the retheming of children's area in 2010. The removal of this ride theme marked the first time since the park's debut (38 years ago) that Scooby-Doo is not present in the park.
Scrappy's Slides	1972	1995		A large, fifteen-lane mat slide that originally opened at Coney Island in 1969 as Sky Slide before being relocated to Kings Island as Flying Carpet. The ride was first located where Zephyr is today before being relocated to Hanna-Barbera Land in 1986 and renamed Scrappy's Slides (at times referred to as the singular Scrappy's Slide). When the ride was relocated within the park, it was modified from three large dips to only two. It operated near the present location of Woodstock’s Air Rail through the 1995 season.
Skylab	1986	1997	HUSS Enterprise	A ride with two seats in one car which would spin vertically like a fast moving Ferris wheel. Centrifugal force would cause the cars to go upside down. In 2023 a new type of this ride was added called Sol Spin.
Skyride	1972	1979	Von Roll	A cable car skyride that took passengers from Oktoberfest (Adventure Port)(where Sol Spin is today), over the International Street fountains, to Hanna Barbera Land (Planet Snoopy). The Station house still remains today as a merchandise store. Relocated from Coney Island Ohio (1965–1971).
SlingShot	2002	2021	Funtime	Pay-per-ride reverse bungee attraction that catapults riders, seated in a steel cage, 275 feet (84 m) into the air up to 100 mph (160 km/h). Riders flip multiple times before returning slowly to the platform. Its removal was announced during the 2022 season. In 2023 Cargo Loco replaced this ride.
Smurf's Enchanted Voyage	1984	1991	Arrow Development	A re-theme of the former Enchanted Voyage. Riders sailed through several rooms featuring Smurf figures celebrating the different seasons. The ride closed after the 1991 season and was replaced with Phantom Theater.
Sunshine Turnpike	1972	1994	Arrow Development	Yet another sports car ride, this one was located in Hanna Barbera Land. It was removed after the 1994 season, to make room for Nickelodeon Splat City (today's Camp Snoopy). Formerly known as Marathon Turnpike, Speed Buggy Turnpike.
The Crypt	2002	2011	Huss (Giant Top Spin)	Formerly known as Tomb Raider: The Ride (2002–2007). An indoor top spin ride originally themed to the film Lara Croft: Tomb Raider. Designed by Paramount Parks Design & Entertainment with special effects by Technifex, Inc. Included actual props from the movie in its queue and preshow. Following the sale of the park by Paramount to Cedar Fair in 2006, the theme, musical soundtrack, and pre-show were all removed in 2008 and it was renamed The Crypt. One of the ride's three rows of seating was removed, allowing for a more intense ride program with eight flips. The eight flip program was retired mid-2009 and replaced with a more tame two-flip variant. Kings Island announced the ride's closure on Twitter on February 14, 2012. The building is now used for Madame Fatale's Cavern of Terror haunted house during Halloween Haunt.
The Rotor	1972	1981	Chance Rides (Rotor)	A spinning flat ride where passengers line the walls of a circular room. As the ride rotates and reaches a particular speed, centrifugal force keeps each passenger pinned against the wall as the floor lowers. Originally opened at Coney Island in 1969, it was later relocated to King Island's Oktoberfest(Adventure Port) section. The Rotor was removed following the 1981 operating season.
Thunder Alley	1996	2012	J&J Amusements	Pay-per-ride Go-kart racing track. Formerly known as XS Raceway (1996–1998), Days of Thunder (1999–2007). It was removed to make room for Banshee.
Tumble Bug	1972	1985	Harry Traver	A 1920s classic that pulled linked cars around an undulating circular track, similar to Turtle at Kennywood Park. This was also the oldest ride to ever operate at the park. Relocated from Coney Island (1925–1971).
Wheel of Fortune	1972	1984	Chance Rides (Trabant)	A Trabant ride themed as a roulette wheel, located next to Kings Mill Log Flume (Charlie Brown’s Rushing River Log Ride). Sold to Fantasy Farm after removal from Kings Island. Later sold to Bland's Park (now DelGrosso's Amusement Park), where it still operates. Location now occupied by Linus Launcher.
Winnie Witch's Cauldrons	1972	1991		Small spinning teacup-like ride located between the First Aid Station and the then Flintstone's Boulder Bumpers (Joe Cool’s Dodgem School). In 2023 a new type of this ride came in called Cargo Loco.
Zodiac	1975	1986	Waagner-Biro (Sold by Intamin)	A double Ferris wheel. Unlike most Ferris wheels, this ride had a wheel mounted on each end of a massive hydraulic arm. While one wheel was rotating high up in the air, the other was perpendicular to the ground so that the cylindrical gondolas (which were suspended from finger-like spokes) could be loaded all at once. It closed in 1986 and was removed before the 1987 season. It was relocated to Australia's Wonderland in Sydney, Australia, another Taft venture park, and was then dismantled in 2004 when that park closed.

== Former attractions ==
Ride	Year opened	Year closed	Description
Dinosaurs Alive!	2011	2017	A pay-per-entry attraction that was considered the world's largest animatronic dinosaur park with more than 60 life-sized dinosaurs. Most exhibits were demonstrated how scientists believed the animal moved, and some featured interactive consoles that guests could control. The site is now the home of the Orion giga coaster and Kings Mills Antique Autos.
Stadium of Stars	1977	1981	A facility for visiting celebrity entertainers, constructed across from the American Heritage Music Hall.
Snoopy's Splash Dance	1995	2014	Walk-through water attraction. Formerly known as Nickelodeon Green Slime Zone (1995–2005) and SpongeBob SquarePants Bikini Bottom Bash (2006–2009). The attraction was removed to make room for Franklin’s Flyers, a classic flying scooters ride, and Snoopy's Space Buggies.
Back Porch Stage	2005	2008	Located in Rivertown, this stage was removed for the entrance to Diamondback. Before the stage was built this area was a walkway and bridge behind the International Showplace connecting the two areas.
Emergency Green Slime Shower	1995	2005	Introduced with Nickelodeon's Splat City, it was the slime shower in the middle of Nickelodeon's Green Slime Zone
Flight Team Aerial Helicopter Tours	2000	2003	Helicopter Tour of the park and surrounding area. Replaced by Firehawk in 2007. The site is now the home of the Orion giga coaster.
Kenton's Cove Canoes	1972	1972	Two-person canoes. Replaced with Kenton's Cove Keelboat Canal.
Shawnee Landing	1972	1976	Large canoes. Featured in an episode of The Brady Bunch as the location where the missing plans were found. Removed for construction of The Beast.
Paramount Story	1993	2006	Walk-through garden area that replaced Tower Gardens (1978–1992). Included props from Paramount films such as Wayne's World, Addams Family Values, and The Golden Child. After Cedar Fair acquired the park the Paramount props were removed and the attraction was reverted to Tower Gardens. The area now functions as a History Walk the spring and summer and Candy Cane Lane during Winterfest.
Kings Island Theater	1972	1977	Large red air dome located next to Eiffel Tower and used as a theater. Original structure collapsed December 1, 1974 after a heavy snowfall. Replacement structure operated through 1977 before being replaced with Tower Gardens..
Cinema 180 Theatre	1986		A 60 by 30-foot-high screen was designed to make viewers feel as though they were part of the action—whether this was pulling 5-G's while flying with the U.S. Air Force "Thunderbirds", flying over the Mt. St. Helen's crater, or feeling out of control on a runaway train.
Enchanted Theatre	1992	2005	500 seat children's theater in Hanna-Barbera Land located in the Phantom Theater building. This theater has since been the site of the Halloween attraction CarnEVIL. But would later be removed for Snoopy's Sketch School, made for the Peanuts Anniversary the park hosted. Now it is a theater named the Peanuts Showplace.
Lazer Maze	1991	2015	Laser-tag in Coney Mall, Now replaced with Coney BBQ.
Aqua Arena	1972	1994	Theater with marine animals located behind International Showplace. Had 2000 seats, a 100,000 gallon tank, and the Salt Water Circus performing dolphin show. Also known as Stage 1 (1994).
MacScrappy's Farm	1982	1994	Playground located in Hanna-Barbera Land.
Jelly Bean Bowl	1982		Located in Hanna-Barbera Land.
Splash Island	1989	1996	Children's water play area in Waterworks. Had 3 water slides and a splash area. Removed for in the 1997 expansion.
FasTracks	1989	2003	A set of four different speed slides located in Waterworks. Each slide had a separate name; The Plunge, White Lightning, The Streak, and Thunder Run. Replaced by the Coolangatta Racer (today known as Rendezvous Run).
Wild Animal Safari amphitheater			Located in the Wild Animal Safari area of the park where Festhaus is now located
Hoedown			Located in the Wild Animal Safari area of the park where Invertigo is now located.
Monkey Island	1974	1987	A group of islands that housed monkeys in Lion Country Safari. Located where Congo falls now stands.
Little Miami Dry Goods Store			Located in Rivertown. Building was removed for Diamondback queue area. Also known as Boom Bang Kapow Inc.
Southern Seas			Located next to the Salt Water Circus.
Elephant Fountain			Was the centerpiece of Hanna-Barbera Land. Today it serves as a sign for the Jungle Jim's "World of Food" monorail, formerly Lion Country Safari monorail.
Remote control cars and boats			Located in Hanna-Barbera Land
Shaggy's Silly Sticks			Located in Hanna-Barbera Land
Fool House			Located in Hanna-Barbera Land
Hanna-Barbera Arcade			Located in Hanna-Barbera Land
Woodland Theater			Located in Hanna-Barbera Land. Was a puppet theater designed like a large tree called "Woody". There was a daily puppet show. Also known as the Puppet Tree Theater.
Petting Zoo			Located in Lion Country Safari.
Tram Service			A tram that would take guests to and from the park entrance and parking areas. Sponsored by Sohio.
International Air Show			Show featured a hot air balloon launch, sky diving, and aerial acrobatics performed by two World War 1 biplanes.
Electric Shooting Gallery			Located in Coney Island(Coney Mall) between where Coney Refreshments and Juke Box Diner are located today. Building has been removed.
Nature Trail	bef 1981		A walking nature trail located behind The Beast entrance.
Nairobi Nursery	bef 1981		Animal Nursery in the Wild Animal Safari area.
African Queen	bef 1981		Remote control boats in Wild Animal Safari.
Hanna-Barbera Amphitheater	1972		Stage located in Hanna-Barbera. Also known as Happy Theater.
Yogi's Jamboree	1990		Kids play area in Hanna-Barberra.
Shady Maple Picnic Grove	1987	199?	Located in the wooded area outside front gate
Boat Tag	1994		Located in Rivertown
Crystal Slime Aerobic Mining Maze	1995	????	A kids climbing maze located in Nickelodeon Splat City.
The Slime Derrick	1995	????	Tower that exploded with green water like the one located in Nickelodeon Studios Florida, located in Nickelodeon Splat City. Had a clock and pressure gauge to let you know when to expect the next explosion.
Green Slime Transfer Truck	1995	????	A truck located in Nickelodeon Splat City with interactive buttons, levers, and valves.
Lookout Lagoon	1997	2024	A water play area for kids themed as a pirate ship with several water slides and water cannons. Opened as part of Buccaneer Island (1997–2003). Known as Kangaroo Lagoon (2004–2011). Replaced by Bluegill Lagoon in 2025.
Water Wars	1995		Located in Rivertown.
Original Winterfest	1982	1992	In 1982 Kings Island introduced a Christmas event called Winterfest, which ran from November 25 through December 31. The International Street fountain attraction was turned into an ice-skating rink, and for a few years a nightly laser light show was centered on the Eiffel Tower. Most rides were closed with the exception of a holiday-themed train ride, the Grand Carousel, hayrides, and the Enchanted Voyage. In earlier years, horse-drawn carriage rides existed as well. Special shops, restaurants, and other holiday-themed activities were also available. There were live holiday shows at both the American Heritage Music Hall (now the Kings Island Theater) and Festhaus. The event ended after the 1992 season, but made one additional appearance in 2005. A variety of reasons including low ticket sales prompted new owners Cedar Fair to shelve the idea. In 2016, it was announced that Winterfest would return in 2017 and would be free to all Gold and Platinum pass holders. Kings Island said that Winterfest would return in 2018 and beyond.

== Former Halloween Haunt attractions ==
Former attraction	Opened	Closed	Replaced by
Torture Tower	2000	2001	N/A
The Freezer	2000	2001	????
Pirate Jack & the Legend of Halloween in 4-D	2000	2001	????
The Sewer in 4-D	2000	2001	Festhaus
The Mummy's Revenge	2000	2001	Madame Fatale's Cavern of Terror
Museum of Horrors	2000	2001	Phantom Theater
Freak Show	2000	2001	Removed
House of Darkness	2001	2004	R.L. Stine Fear Street Nights
Holiday Horror	2010	2014	Beagle Scout Acres
Club Blood	2007	2014	Blackout
Headless Hollow/Tombstone Terror-Tory	2005	2015	Mystic Timbers
Cornstalkers	2005	2015	Backwoods Bayou
Sorority House/Delta Delta Die	2013	2016	Coney Bar-B-Que (restaurant)
CarnEvil / Circus of Horrors 3-D (2001–2007)	2001	2017	Peanuts Showplace
Board to Death	2013	2017	CHAOS
Field of Screams	2016	2019	Orion
Urgent Scare	2008	2019	Hotel St. Michelle
Backwoods Bayou	2016	2019	Cornered(2021) moved in 2022
Blackout	2016	2019	Order of the Dragon
Wolf Pack	2010	2019	N/A
Chaos	2018	2022	Alien Abyss
Madame Fatale's Cavern of Terror	2012	2024	The Conjuring: Beyond Fear
Alien X	2022	2024	N/A

== Former shows ==
Name	Year opened	Year closed	Location
Apupetsho	1982	1982	Woodland Theater
Back to the 90's	2017	2017	Festhaus
Back to Country	????	1990	International Showplace
Bedrock Bedlam	1985	1986	Hanna-Barbera Amphitheater
Belly up to the Bar, Belles	1982	1983	Columbia Place
Blockbuster	1987	????	Cinema 180 Theater
Breakaway	1985	1986	International Showplace
British Invasion	2012	2013	Festhaus
Can't Stop the Music	????	1981	International Showplace
Celebration	1982	1983	American Heritage Music Hall
Charlie Brown's Hoedown (Original Version)	2010	2010	PEANUTS Playhouse
Charlie Brown's Pirate Adventure	2011	2011	PEANUTS Playhouse
Charlie Brown's All-Stars	2012	2012	PEANUTS Playhouse
Charlie Brown’s Christmas Spectacular	2017	2021	Kings Island Theater
Charlie Brown's Jungle Journey	2013	2013	PEANUTS Playhouse
Cheers, The Show	1995	????	Festhaus
City Rhyhm	1982	1982	American Heritage Music Hall
Club KI	2022	2023	International Street Bandstand
Country Music Showdown!	1984	1984	International Showplace
Crazy Wheels	1995	????	Cinema 180 Theater
Cross-Country	1986	1986	International Showplace
Cirque Imagine	2014	2016	Kings Island Theater
Dancin' in the street	1993	1994	International Street Bandstand
Days of Thunder	1994	1996	Action Theater
Deep in the Heart of Country	1986		
Delta Steamers	1986	????	Royal Fountain Bandstand
Don't Stop The Music!	2009	2010	International Street Bandstand
Dora's Sing-A-Long Adventure	2007	2008	Nickelodeon Theater
Down Home Country	2009	2010	Festhaus
Dracula's Haunted Castle			Action Theater - FearFest
Elvira's Superstition			Action Theater - FearFest
Encore	1982	1982	International Showplace
Endless Summer: On Ice!	2007	2009	Kings Island Theater
Ed Alonzo's Psycho Circus Of Magic & Mayhem Parts 1 & 2	2012	2013	Kings Island Theater
Escapade	1992	1992	Kings Island Theater
Fantasy	1987	????	American Heritage Music Hall
Flapper Dapper Dixie Band	1978		
Flashback: Totally 80's (Original Version)	2008	2009	International Showplace
Flight 747	????	1990	Cinema 180 Theater
Follies	Pre-1977	????	Kings Island Theater (Original)
Friend of a feather	1994	1994	Stage 1
Flintstones Family Christmas	1991	????	American Heritage Music Hall - Winterfest
Flintstones Go Hollyrock	????	1993	Enchanted Theater
Fred's ABC Do Re Mi	1994	1994	Enchanted Theater
Freddie Flintstone's Bedrock Buddies	????	1990	Woodlands Amphitheater
Funhouse Express			Action Theater - FearFest
Galaxy of Trills	????	1993	Cinema 180 Theater
Game On!	1994	1994	Festhaus
Ghouls Gone Wild	2008, 2024	2010, present	Festhaus - Hauntfest
Girls Night Out	2008		Festhaus
Gotta Dance	1984	1986	American Heritage Music Hall
Graveyard Shift	2011		Festhaus - FearFest
Gravity a Cirque experience	2018	2020	Kings Island Theater
Grin "N" Bear It	????	1981	International Showplace
Hanna-Barbera Rockapalooza	1995	????	Enchanted Theater
Happy Theatre	1972	????	Hanna-Barbera
Hoedown	?	????	Rivertown
Hollywood Nights	2016	2016	Festhaus
Horray For Hollywood	????	?	American Heritage Music Hall
Hot Blooded	2009	2017	International Showplace - Hauntfest
Hot Hits	????	1990	International Showplace
Hot Ice	1987	????	Festhaus
Hot Island Rhythms	2007	2008	International Street Bandstand
House of Grove	1995	????	International Showplace
I believe in Country	1982	1982	International Showplace
Ice Adventure	????	1990	Festhaus
In Concert	1983	1987	International Showplace
In Country	????	1981	International Showplace
It's Magic	1990	1990	Kings Island Theater
James Bond 007: License To Thrill	1998		Action Theater
Jingle Bell Bedrock	1991	????	The Fun Station - Winterfest
Keds Kids	1979	????	International Street
Kings of Comedy	1982	1987	International Street
Let It Rock	2015	2016	Festhaus
Live at the palace	1985	1986	Columbia Palace
Lively Marine Show	1978		Aqua Arena
Marty's Party	2009	2009	PEANUTS Playhouse
Mega Mess-a-mania	1995	1996	Nickelodeon Theater
More Mega Mess-a-mania	1997	1997	
Monster Rock	2015	2023	Festhaus
Meteor Attack	2002	2002	Action Theater
New York, New York	1978	????	American Heritage Music Hall
Nicktoons	2004	2006	Nickelodeon Theater
Nicktoons Block Party	1998	1998	Nickelodeon Theater
Nicktoons Rockin Countdown	1999	1999	Nickelodeon Theater
Nicktoons Summer Jam	2000	2001	Nickelodeon Theater
Off The Rails	2022	2024	International Showplace
Origins a Cirque experience	2016	2018	Kings Island Theater
Paramount on Ice	????	1993	Festhaus
Paramount on Ice: BLOCK-BUSTERS!	1996	????	Paramount Theater
Paramount on Ice: Lights! Camera!Action!	1994	1994	Paramount Theater
Paramount on Ice: Legends	1995	1995	Paramount Theater
Phantom Theater Encore	2022	2023	Kings Island Theater
Play me that country music	1983	1983	International Showplace
Pickin and Grinnin	1978		
RETRO: Repeat the Beat	1996	????	
Rock Around the Clock	1979	1981	International Showplace
Rock 'n Roll Explosion	1983	1986	American Heritage Music Hall
Rock the house	1993	1994	International Showplace
Remember When: The 70's	2012	2013	International Showplace
Santa's Toy Factory	1991	????	American Heritage Music Hall - Winterfest
Salt Water Circus	1972	1990	Aqua Arena
Salt Water Friends	????	1993	Aqua Arena
School of Rock: Live in Concert	2005	2006	Paramount Theater
Scooby-Doo and the lost bark	????	1990	International Showplace
Scooby-Doo and the ghost in the attic			Enchanted Theater
Scooby-Doo's Imagi-Machine	1995	????	Enchanted Theater
Show Wagon	1972	????	Old Coney
Signed, Sealed, Delivered!	2010	2011	International Showplace
Singin' to the World	1978	????	International Showplace
Slime Time Live	2002	2003	Nickelodeon Theater
Smash Factory			Action Theater
Smurfs are here	1984	1984	International Showplace
Smurfberry festival	1986	1986	Woodland Theater
Snoopy Rocks! On Ice	2010	2011	Kings Island Theater
Snowdrift Inn	1991	????	Festhaus - Winterfest
Something New!!	1972	????	Old Coney
Song of the Smurfs	1985	1986	International Showplace
SpongeBob SquarePants 3D	2003	2011	Action Theater
Stan Lee's The 7th Portal	2001		Action Theater
Star Search Live	2006		International Street Bandstand
Summer Rhythms	????	1990	Royal Fountain Bandstand
Sweet Country Music	1987	????	International Showplace
That's Entertainment	????	1981	American Heritage Music Hall
The Bear Facts	1982	1983	Puppet Tree Theater
The County Line	2008	2009	Festhaus
The Curse of Gargamel	1986	????	International Showplace
The Fudge is Done	1972	????	Rivertown
The Funtastic World of Hanna-Barbera			Action Theater
The Lazer Zone: Time Warp	1993	1995	Paramount Theater
The Magic of the Movies	2004		
Terror Rising	2022	2023	International Street Bandstand
Tuned In!	2005		International Showplace
Twistin' to the 60s	2007		International Showplace
Way Too Much TV	2010	2011	Festhaus
The 70s on demand	2022	2023	Festhaus
The Wild, Wild West	1994	1994	Cinema 180 Theater
Woodchoppers Ball Revue	1985	1986	Festhaus
World Cabaret	1983	1983	Festhaus
Wunderbar!	1985	1986	Festhaus
Yabba Dabba Doo Caperoo	1979		American Heritage Music Hall
Yogi's Summer Camp Craze	1994	1994	Enchanted Theater
Yogi's Picnic	1982	1983	Hanna-Barbera Amphitheater
Yogi's Place	1987	????	Woodlands Amphitheater
Yogi's Funtastic Machine	1987	????	International Showplace
Yogi's Rock Party	1986	????	Woodland Theatre

== Former area themes ==
Area	Year opened	Year closed	Description
Lion Country Safari	1974	1993	An Africa themed section with a wide variety of real exotic animals. Renamed Wild Animal Safari (1977–1983), Wild Animal Habitat(1983–1994). Completely Re-themed to Adventure Village in 1994.
Adventure Village	1983	1998	The entertainment side of Wild Animal Safari was renamed in 1983. The park section was still themed to Africa, but most of the animals had been sold off and many attractions had been closed down. The area was completely re-themed in 1994 Removed in 1999 to make way for Action Zone.
WaterWorks	1989	2003	The original water park. Expanded into Crocodile Dundee's Boomerang Bay in 2004.
The Happy Land of Hanna-Barbera	1972	2005	Hanna-Barbera themed kid's area. Also known as Hanna-Barbera Land. Rethemed as "The Busy World of Richard Scarry" around 1993; complete with Busy Town Grill. Its next expansion was Nickelodeon Universe in 2006 and again as Planet Snoopy in 2010.
Nickelodeon Splat City	1995	2000	Nickelodeon themed area based on the network's game shows which had attractions involving getting wet.
Nickelodeon Central	2001	2005	Nickelodeon Splat City is renamed after being expanded in the 2000–2001 off-season.
Nickelodeon Universe	2006	2009	Nickelodeon Central was expanded to replace Hanna-Barbera Land leading to its new name. Rethemed to Planet Snoopy in 2010.
Crocodile Dundee's Boomerang Bay	2004	2011	An Australian themed Waterpark. The name was shortened to Boomerang Bay in 2007. Replaced by Soak City for the 2012 season.
X-Base	2007	2019	A secretive military installation themed section of the park which housed Firehawk (roller coaster) and Flight of Fear (roller coaster). After Firehawk was demolished at the end of the 2018 season, Orion (roller coaster) was announced following the end of the 2019 season and would be built in Firehawk's spot, and subsequently, X-Base would be renamed Area-72 along with Orion.

== See also ==
- List of Kings Island attractions
