= List of Kings Island attractions =

Rides at Kings Island

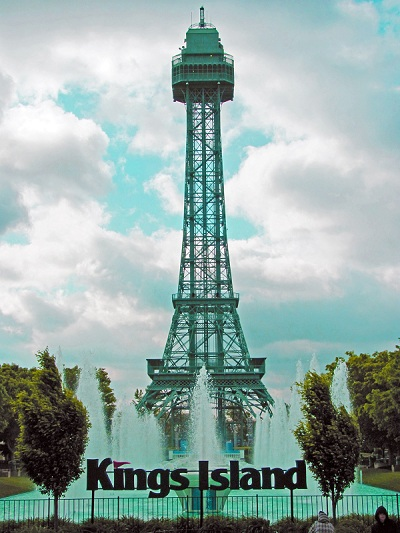
Inside Kings Island's main entrance

Kings Island is a 364-acre (147 ha) amusement park located in Mason, Ohio. The park is known for releasing record-breaking and first-of-a-kind rides over the years, such as Flight of Fear, the world's first launched roller coaster using a linear induction motor, and The Beast which opened as the world's tallest, fastest, and longest wooden roller coaster in 1979. The Beast still retains the length record and continues to be highly ranked in the annual Golden Ticket Awards from Amusement Today. With the addition of Mystic Timbers in 2017, Kings Island claimed the world record for having the most wooden roller coaster track in a single amusement park, and it tied the record for most wooden roller coasters, raising the park's total to five.

Kings Island added a 12-acre (4.9 ha) water park called WaterWorks in 1989, constructed near White Water Canyon. The area featured 15 water slides, a lazy river, and a children's play area. After multiple expansions and name changes, the park was eventually renamed Soak City.

For safety reasons, Kings Island publishes a ride rating system that classifies the attractions one through five based on the intensity of the ride, with one representing the calmest rides to five indicating the most aggressive.

== Kings Island ==
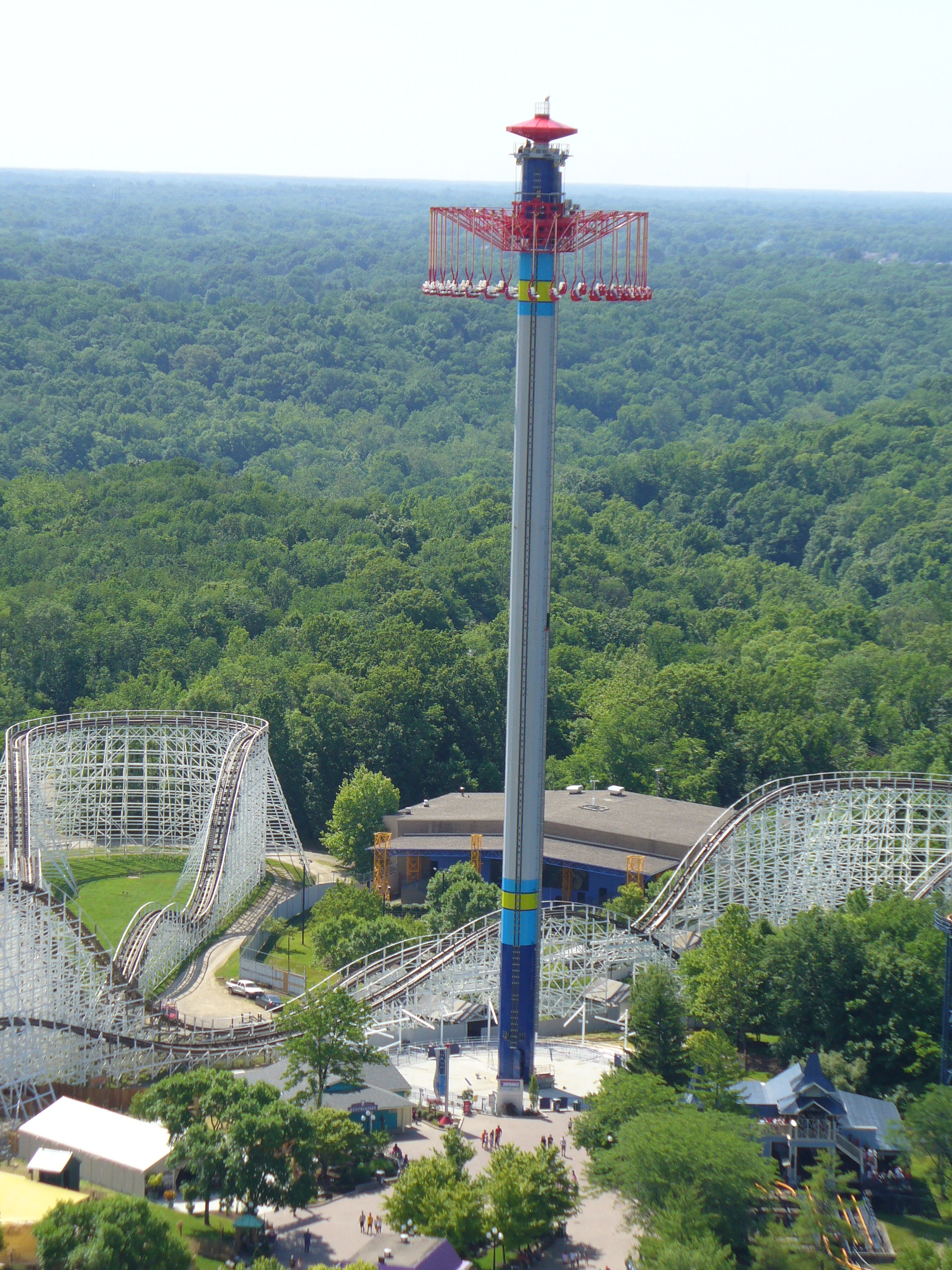
WindSeeker during testing in 2011

Attractions located in Kings Island
Ride	Manufacturer	Type or model	Description	Location	Thrill rating	Ref(s)
Adventure Express	Arrow Dynamics	Mine train roller coaster	Jungle adventure-themed roller coaster that features audio and visual special effects	Adventure Port	5	
Banshee	Bolliger & Mabillard	Inverted Coaster	An inverted roller coaster, the longest of its kind in the world, with seven inversions located in the former location of Son of Beast	Action Zone	5	
Phantom Theater: Opening Nightmare	Sally Corporation	Interactive dark ride	Family dark ride where guests can interact by shooting laser guns at targets throughout the ride	International Street	1	
Cargo Loco	Zamperla	Midi Tea Cup		Adventure Port	1	
Character Carousel	Chance Rides	Carousel	Children's carousel featuring Peanuts characters and themes	Planet Snoopy	1	
Charlie Brown’s Rushing River Log Ride	Arrow Dynamics, Hopkins Rides	Log flume		Camp Snoopy	4	
Charlie Brown's Wind Up	Zamperla	Swing ride	Children's miniature swing ride	Planet Snoopy	1	
Congo Falls	Intamin	Shoot-the-Chutes	An 815-foot-long (248 m) water flume ride with 16-foot (4.9 m) boats and a 34-foot (10 m) drop Formerly known as Amazon Falls (1988–1998)	Action Zone	5	
Delirium	HUSS	Giant Frisbee	Frisbee flat ride that swings riders 76 mph (122 km/h) at an angle of 120°, lifting riders 137 feet (42 m) into the air	Action Zone	5	
Diamondback	Bolliger & Mabillard	Hypercoaster		Rivertown	5	
Dodgem	Barbezi (Azzurra) & Majestic International	Bumper cars		Coney Mall	4	
Drop Tower	Intamin	Gyro Drop	A 315-foot-tall (96 m) drop tower ride that opened as the tallest of its kind in the world Formerly known as Drop Zone: Stunt Tower (1999–2007).	Action Zone	4	
Eiffel Tower	Intamin	Tower		International Street	2	
Festhaus	—N/a	Live show venue		Oktoberfest	—N/a	
Flight of Fear	Premier Rides	Launched roller coaster	Formerly known as The Outer Limits: Flight of Fear (1996–2000)	Area 72	5	
Franklin’s Flyers	Larson International	Flying Scooters		Camp Snoopy	3	
Grand Carousel	Philadelphia Toboggan Company	Carousel		International Street	1	
International Showplace	—N/a	Live show venue		International Street	—N/a	
International Street Bandstand	—N/a	Live show venue	Entertainment venue located between the Eiffel Tower and Royal Fountain	International Street	—N/a	
Invertigo	Vekoma	Invertigo	An inverted Boomerang roller coaster featuring three inversions Formerly known as FACE/OFF (1999–2007)	Action Zone	5	
Joe Cool's Dodgem School	Jurgen Schmidt	Bumper cars		Planet Snoopy	2	
Kings Island and Miami Valley Railroad	Crown Metal Products Company	Steam train		Rivertown	1	
Kings Island Theater	—N/a	Live show venue	A 1,300-seat indoor theater first opened in 1976 and designed by Paul Shortt, the original founding faculty member at Cincinnati's College Conservatory of Music. Formerly known as: American Heritage Music Hall (1976–1992); Paramount Theater (1993–2007)	International Street	—N/a	
Kings Mills Antique Autos	Gould Manufacturing	Antique Cars	An antique car attraction reminiscent of the former Les Taxis ride. Includes a covered bridge, a pond, a faux gas station, and several billboards that reference past Kings Island attractions.	Coney Mall	2	
Kite Eating Tree	Zamperla	Frog hopper		Planet Snoopy	3	
Linus’ Beetle Bugs	W.F. Mangelas Co	Whip Jr.		Planet Snoopy	2	
Linus Launcher	Zamperla	Kite Flyer		Camp Snoopy	3	
Monster	Everly Aircraft Co.	Octopus		Coney Mall	3	
Mystic Timbers	Great Coasters International	Wooden roller coaster		Rivertown	4	
Orion	Bolliger & Mabillard	Giga Coaster		Area 72	5	
PEANUTS 500	Venture Ride Mfg., Inc.	Low-speed car ride		Planet Snoopy	1	
PEANUTS Off-Road Rally	Hampton Amusement Corporation	Mini car carousel		Planet Snoopy	1	
PEANUTS Showplace	—N/a	Live Show Venue		Planet Snoopy	—N/a	
Queen City Stunt Coaster	Premier Rides	Launched roller coaster	Based on a chase sequence in the 2003 film The Italian Job featuring audio and visual effects, including gunfire and flames Formerly known as The Italian Job: Stunt Track (2005–2007) and Backlot Stunt Coaster (2008-2024)	Coney Mall	5	
Sally's Sea Plane	Zamperla	Crazy Bus		Planet Snoopy	2	
Scrambler	Eil Bridge Company	Twist		Coney Mall	3	
Shake, Rattle and Roll	Huss	Troika		Coney Mall	3	
Snoopy's Junction	Heinrich Mack K.C	Train ride		Planet Snoopy	1	
Snoopy’s Soapbox Racers	Vekoma	Family Boomerang		Camp Snoopy		
Snoopy vs. Red Baron	Zamperla	Mini Jet		Planet Snoopy	2	
Sol Spin	Zamperla	Endeavour		Adventure Port		
Surf Dog	Zamperla	Rockin' Tug		Planet Snoopy	4	
The Bat	Arrow Dynamics	Suspended Coaster	A suspended roller coaster originally themed to the film Top Gun in 1993 and was later renamed The Bat, paying homage to the first suspended coaster in the world that opened in 1981; Formerly known as: Top Gun (1993–2007); Flight Deck (2007–2013)	Action Zone	5	
The Beast	Kings Island	Wooden roller coaster	A custom wooden coaster built and designed internally by Kings Island which still holds the world record for length according to Guinness World Records	Rivertown	5	
The Great Pumpkin Coaster	E&F Miler Industries	Children's roller coaster		Planet Snoopy	2	
The Racer	Philadelphia Toboggan Company	Wooden roller coaster		Coney Mall	4	
Timberwolf	—N/a	Amphitheatre	Outdoor amphitheatre concert venue	Action Zone	—N/a	
Viking Fury	Intamin	Pirate ship		Oktoberfest	3	
White Water Canyon	Intamin	River rapids ride		Rivertown	4	
WindSeeker	Mondial	Wind Seeker		Coney Mall	4	
Woodstock Express	Philadelphia Toboggan Company	Wooden roller coaster	Formerly known as: Scooby Doo (1972–1979); The Beastie (1979–2005); Fairly Odd Coaster (2006–2010)	Planet Snoopy	4	
Woodstock's Air Rail	Vekoma	Suspended Family Coaster		Camp Snoopy	4	
Woodstock Whirlybirds	Caripro Amusement Technology	Tram		Planet Snoopy	2	
Zephyr	Zierer	Wave Swinger		Coney Mall	3	

== Soak City ==
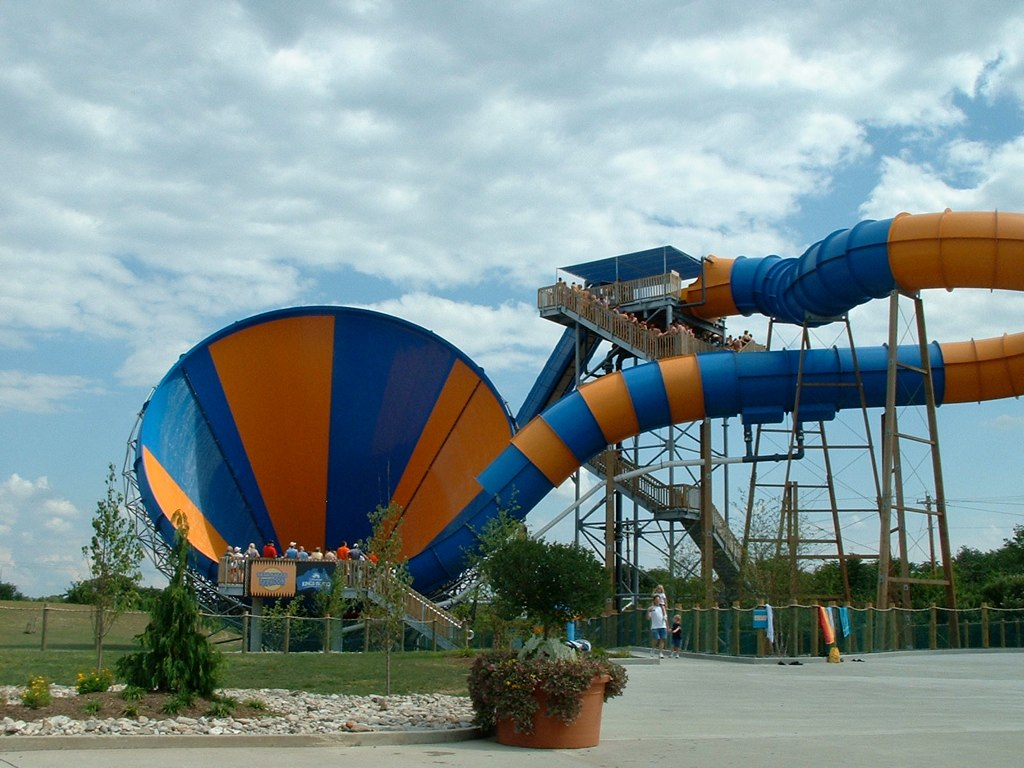
Mondo Monsoon in Soak City

Soak City opened in 1989 as WaterWorks, 17 years after Kings Island opened. In 1997, Kings Island expanded the water park to 15 acres (6.1 ha) by adding the wave pool (Surfside Bay; now known as Breakers Bay), and a new children's water playground. The following year, the FlowRider, and Pipeline Paradise opened as Wipeout Beach. Six years later, WaterWorks was renamed to Crocodile Dundee's Boomerang Bay Waterpark (later simplified to Boomerang Bay Waterpark). In 2012, the water park was re-branded to Cedar Fair's Soak City. All of the water slides and the lazy river were refurbished. An additional wave pool was also constructed.

|}

Name	Picture	Opened	Description	Rating	Ref
Bluegill Lagoon		2025	Located in Splash River Junction. A reimagined ol’ fashioned swimmin’ hole, complete with a water tower.		
Breakers Bay		1997	36,000-square-foot (3,300 m^{2}) family-friendly wave pool. Known as Surfside Bay (1997–2003), Great Barrier Reef (2004–2011).	4	
Coconut Cove		2004	Lagoon-style pool complete with cascading waterfalls and in-water lounging areas. Known as Kookaburra Bay (2004–2011)	1	
Mondo Monsoon		2004	A four-passenger, raft ride – ProSlide Tornado model – which begins enclosed and ends with a steep drop into an open funnel. Known as Tazmanian Typhoon (2004–2011)	5	
Paradise Plunge		1989	Four twisting body slides which descend into a splash pool. Known as The Helix (1989–2003), Down Under Thunder (2004–2011).	4	
Pineapple Pipeline		1989	Three fully enclosed body slides. Known as Bonzai Pipeline (1989–2003), Bondi Pipeline (2004–2011).	3	
Rendezvous Run		2004	A set of four head-first, racing slides up to 50-foot (15 m) high that are enclosed during the first portion of the ride before sending riders down a series of hills to the finish. Known as Coolangatta Racer (2004–2011)	4	
Riverbank Slide Out		1997	Located in Splash River Junction. Children's inner tube slide and splash pool. Opened as part of Buccaneer Island (1997–2003). Known as Koala Splash (2004–2011) and Aruba Tuba (2012-2024).	2	
RiverRacers		2025	Hold on tight! Riders board side-by-side rafts at the starting line where a conveyor belt launch sends them plunging down a 33-foot, 47-degree first drop. Giant windows help racers see if their raft is in the lead while the water coaster reaches its 30 mph, fastest speed. As each raft nears the bottom of the drop and starts to climb upward, water jets drench the riders and propel them up into an enclosed tunnel illuminated with special lighting effects. The race is on as racers zip through more twists and turns, rushing into an open-air, high-banking slingshot, whipping them around 180 degrees into a gravity-defying final mega drop to see who crosses the finish line first!		
Salamander Sliders		2025	Located in Splash River Junction. Seven children water slides.		
Splash Landing		2004	Family-oriented, multi-level water play area complete with slides, bridges and a giant dumping bucket. Known as Jackaroo Landing (2004–2011).	2	
Splash River		1989	A 0.25-mile (0.40 km) inner tube lazy river ride revamped in 2012 that features raindrop mushrooms, geysers, waterfalls, and areas that allow interaction between riders and spectators. Known as Kings Mills Run (1989–2004), Crocodile Run (2004–2011).	2	
Tadpool		1997	Located in Splash River Junction. Children's water play area with several water slides. Opened as part of Buccaneer Island (1997–2003). Known as Wallaby Wharf (2004–2011) and Castaway Cove (2012-2024)	1	
Thunder Falls		1989	A pair of classic inner-tube slides. Formerly known as Sidewinder (1989-2003), Sydney Sidewinder (2004–2011)	3	
Tidal Wave Bay		2012	42,000-square-foot (3,900 m^{2}) wave pool.	4	
Tropical Plunge		2016	A multi-slide complex with body and tube slides. It is identical to the installations at other Six Flags parks including Kings Dominion, Dorney Park, Carowinds, Cedar Point, Knott's Berry Farm, Worlds of Fun, and California's Great America.	5	
Tropical Twister		1989	A pair of fully enclosed body slides made of translucent fiberglass that twist around each other during their descent. Known as Ultra Twister (1989–2003), Awesome Aussie Twister (2004–2011).	4	
Zoom Flume		1990	A family raft ride that accommodates up to four riders per raft. Known as Rushing River (1990-2003), Known as Snowy River Rampage (2004–2011)	4	

|}

== See also ==
- List of former Kings Island attractions

== Notes ==
1. Denotes the requirement that guests pay an additional fee for the ride or attraction.
