= Nighthawk (roller coaster) =

Steel roller coaster

- Previously known as Stealth (2000–2003) at California's Great America; Borg Assimilator (2004–2007)
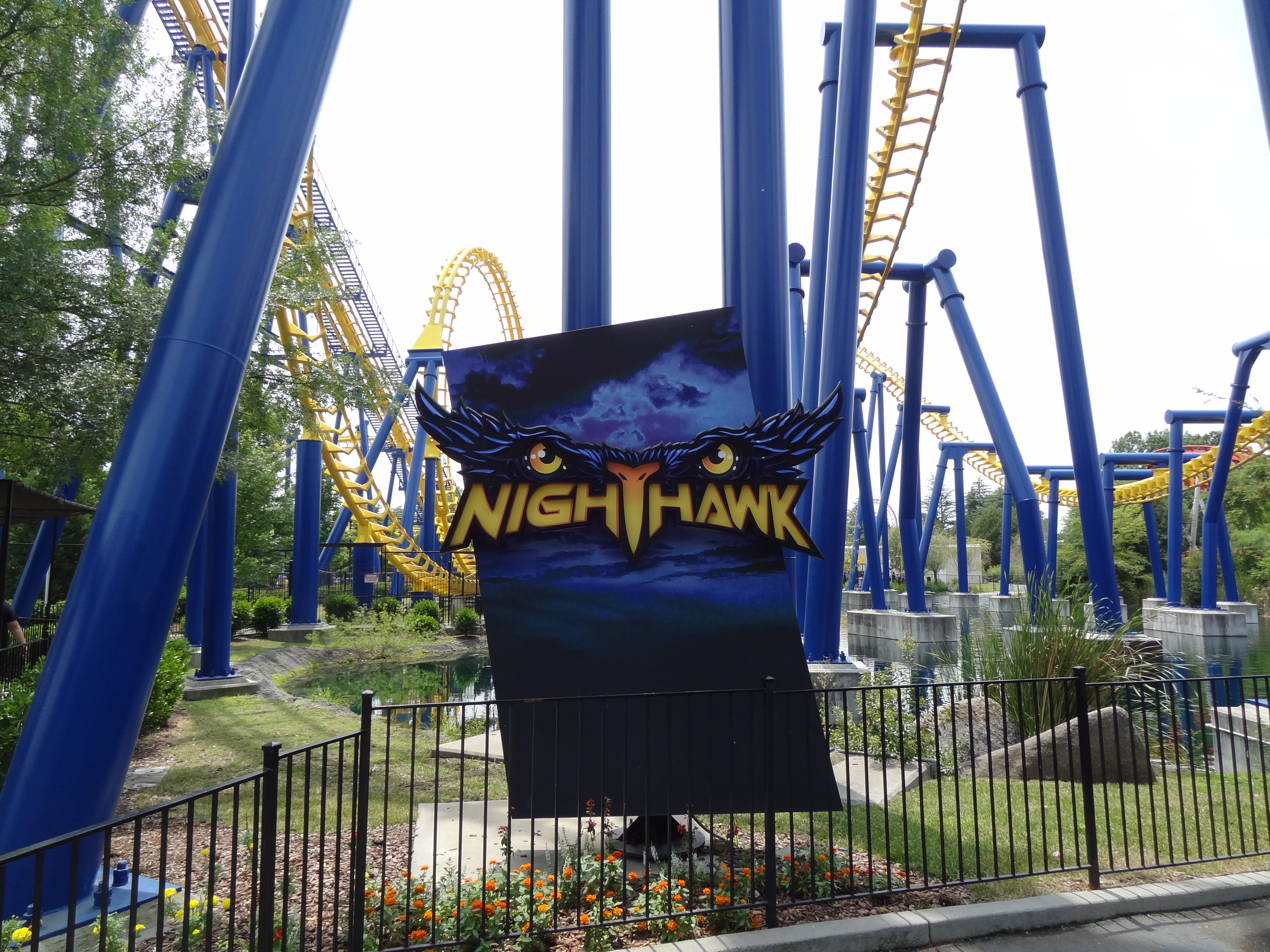

Carowinds
- Park section: Thunder Road
- Coordinates: 35°06′10″N 80°56′30″W
- Status: Removed
- Opening date: March 20, 2004
- Closing date: December 18, 2024
- Replaced: Carolina Sternwheeler Riverboat

California's Great America
- Coordinates: 37.396166°N 121.970476°W
- Status: Removed
- Opening date: April 1, 2000
- Closing date: September 2, 2003
- Cost: US$17,000,000
- Replaced: Yankee Clipper
- Replaced by: South Bay Shores
- Nighthawk at California's Great America at RCDB

General statistics
- Type: Steel – Flying
- Manufacturer: Vekoma
- Model: Flying Dutchman
- Lift/launch system: Chain lift hill
- Height: 115 ft (35 m)
- Drop: 103 ft (31 m)
- Length: 2,766 ft (843 m)
- Speed: 51 mph (82 km/h)
- Inversions: 5
- Duration: 1:50
- Max vertical angle: 53°
- Capacity: 1000 (Currently 312) riders per hour
- G-force: 4.3
- Height restriction: 54–81 in (137–206 cm)
- Trains: 2 trains with 6 cars; riders arranged 4 across in a single row for a total of 24 riders per train
- Fast Lane was available
- Nighthawk at RCDB

Nighthawk was a flying roller coaster located at Carowinds. Constructed by Vekoma, it was located in the Thunder Road section of the park. The roller coaster originally opened as Stealth at California's Great America on April 1, 2000. In 2003, Paramount Parks decided to relocate the roller coaster to Carowinds. It reopened as Borg Assimilator – the first coaster in the world to be themed to Star Trek – on March 20, 2004. After Cedar Fair (now Six Flags) purchased Carowinds in 2006, the Paramount theming was soon removed from the park, and the ride was renamed Nighthawk.

On December 18, 2024, Carowinds announced the permanent closure and removal of the ride.

== History ==
=== California's Great America (2000–2003) ===
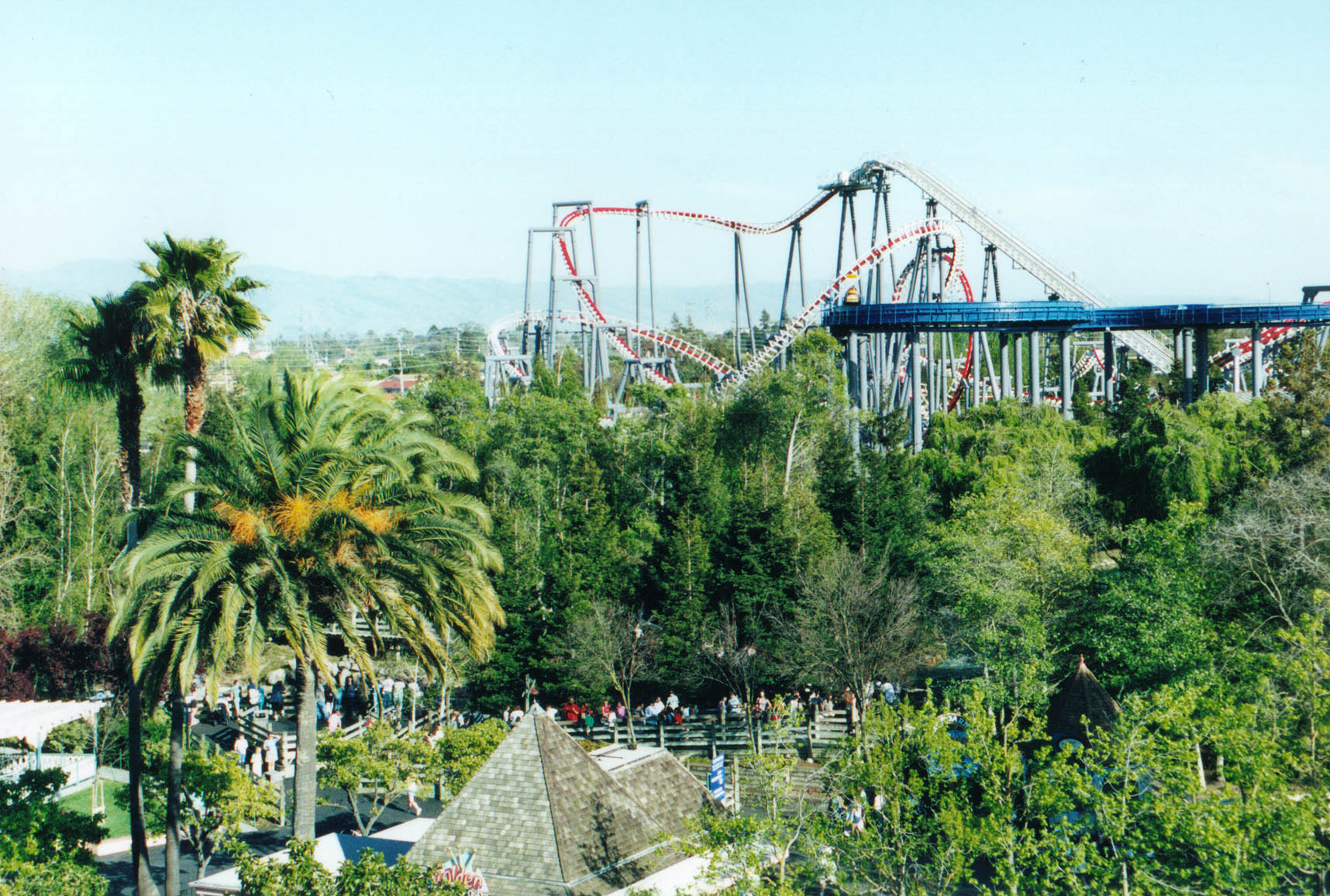
Nighthawk when it was known as Stealth at California's Great America.

On June 22, 1999, California's Great America announced Stealth as "the world's first true flying coaster." For Stealth to be installed, the log flume, Logger's Run, had to be altered and the Yankee Clipper had to be removed. The ride officially opened to the public on April 1, 2000.

Stealth faced many issues during its run in California. The most notable of these was the electrical box, which monitored the restraints and locking devices that allowed the cars to raise and lower. It was placed on each train instead of being located in the electrical room. This created stress on the ride vehicles and components.

On August 21, 2003, the park announced that Stealth would close on September 1 to make room for a new water park, Boomerang Bay (now known as South Bay Shores). The station is still located in the water park today as the queue for the water slides (Coastal Cruz, NorCal Wipeout, and Mission Falls).

=== Carowinds (2004–2024) ===
In 1984, Carowinds added Smurf Island, which was a children's play area located on the 1.3-acre (5,300 m^{2}) island surrounded by the Carolina Sternwheeler. In the 1990s, Smurf Island was eventually closed and later demolished to make space for a new ride.

On August 21, 2003, Carowinds announced a new flying roller coaster that would be relocated from California's Great America. The ride's name was not announced at the time. On January 15, 2004, it was announced the new roller coaster would be named Borg Assimilator and would be the first Star Trek themed roller coaster. Regarding the design of the attraction, Dale Kaetzel, Vice President of marketing and Assistant General Manager, said:

Borg Assimilator gives our guests a unique opportunity – to experience the sensations of free flight without the traditional boundaries of a roller coaster. As you look out over the park, you get a virtually unobstructed view of the landscape and you are continually surprised at where the experience takes you.

Borg Assimilator subsequently replaced the Carolina Sternwheeler Riverboat, a paddle boat ride that took riders around the seven themed areas of the park. Original plans included preserving the boat, docking it on the left side of the river that is still intact, and renovating it into a restaurant accessed via bridges from the pathway under Nighthawk. The boat was eventually damaged during relocation causing these plans to be cancelled and the boat to be scrapped. Some modifications were made to the ride prior to opening. Park engineers worked out the prototype bugs and the electrical box was redesigned. It officially opened to the public on March 20, 2004.

Cedar Fair Entertainment Company purchased Carowinds in 2006 and was offered to use the rights of all Paramount properties for ten years at a nominal fee. Cedar Fair declined and renamed all Paramount-branded attractions, including Borg Assimilator. In 2008, the ride was renamed to Nighthawk and the Star Trek theming was removed, including the black sphere that was in the pond underneath the ride. In 2009, Nighthawk was painted with dark blue supports and yellow track.

On December 18, 2024, Carowinds announced that Nighthawk, along with the Drop Tower and Scream Weaver rides located in the park's Thrill Zone section, would be permanently closed and removed from the park, after the park’s operating season had already ended. The ride was fully removed, sans its station, by the end of March. In May 2025, a train from the ride was sent to the National Roller Coaster Museum.

== Ride experience ==
=== Track ===
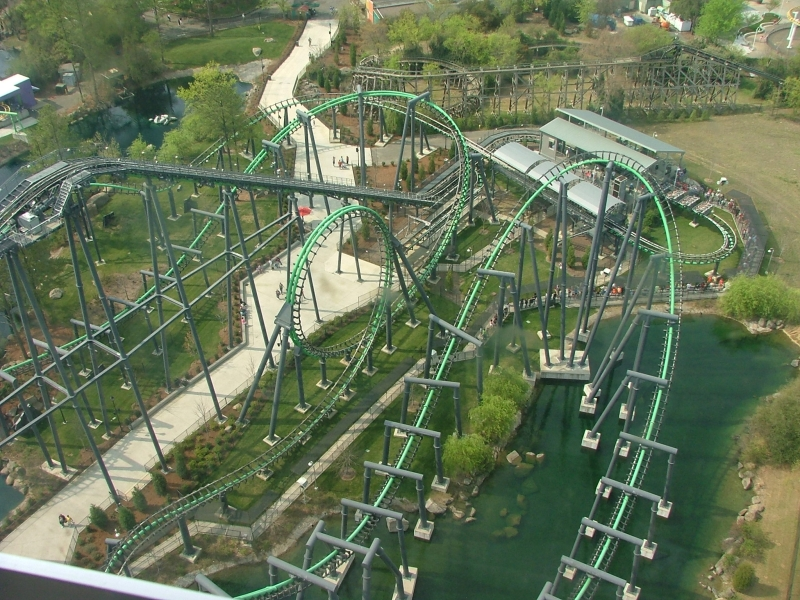
Nighthawk when it was known as Borg Assimilator.

The steel track was approximately 2,766 feet (843 m) in length and the height of the lift was approximately 115 feet (35 m). While at California's Great America, the track was painted red and white with steel gray supports. When the ride was relocated to Carowinds, the track was repainted black and green and the supports remained gray. After the name was changed in 2008, the ride was once again repainted with yellow track and blue supports.

Nighthawk had a total of five inversions. It featured one vertical loop, a double corkscrew, two "Lie to Fly" and two "Fly to Lie" elements. Each "Lie to Fly" and "Fly to Lie" element counted as a half inversion. A "Lie to Fly" element is when riders are on their backs, facing the sky and they are flipped and face the ground, while a "Fly to Lie" element is the opposite.

=== Layout ===
Once riders were seated and restrained, the train tilted backwards into a 'lay-down' position and was dispatched. The train traveled backwards out of the station, turned left and traveled up a 115-foot (35 m) lift hill. Once the train reached the top of the lift hill, it dipped down into a twist (called a "Lie-to-Fly") that turned the trains upside down into a flying position where riders faced the ground. After the twist, the train traveled down the first drop, reaching speeds of 51 mph (82 km/h). Riders then went through an over banked Horseshoe Curve element. Following the Horseshoe, the train entered a "Fly-to-Lie" element that turned riders back to a lay-down position. After the banked turn, the ride entered a 66-foot (20 m) tall vertical loop, where riders experienced 4.3 G's. The train then went into another "Lie-to-Fly" element. Following the loop, riders went through another turn into the final "Fly-to-Lie" element before entering two consecutive corkscrews before making a right turn onto the brake run.

=== Theme ===
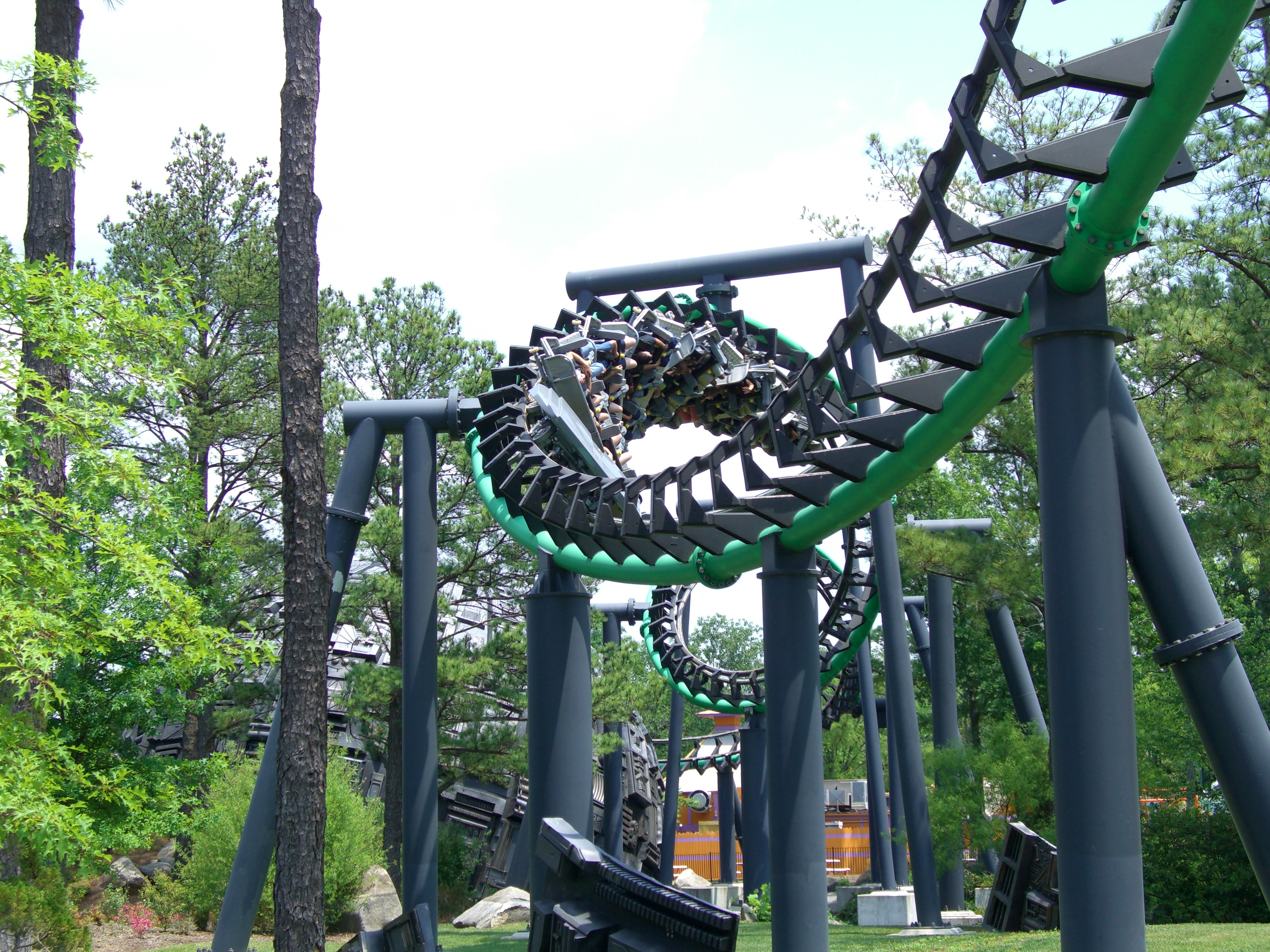
Nighthawk when it was known as Borg Assimilator in the double corkscrew. (Parts of the theming can be seen)

While the ride was located at California's Great America, there was no theme for the ride. When it was relocated to Carowinds in 2004, it was built as the first Star Trek themed roller coaster in the world. It was renamed Borg Assimilator and the story was that "Borg crash-landed in the middle of Carowinds and their ship – a giant gray and black sphere – has come to rest near the park's new flying roller coaster." There was a gray and black sphere located in the pond underneath the ride that the Borg crashed in. In addition to other theming, a voice was played surrounding the ride saying Borg quotes. After Cedar Fair bought the park, all the Star Trek theming was removed and the name was changed for the 2008 season.

=== Trains ===
Nighthawk operated with two trains. Each train had six cars that have four seats in a single row for a total of 24 riders. Riders were restrained by an over-the-shoulder restraint and a lap bar. Riders could put on the restraint themselves, but only a ride operator could push down the lap bar. While in the station, the trains reclined back to the laying down position.

== Incidents ==
On March 17, 2007, seven employees received minor injuries when their seats changed position during a test run of the roller coaster. An inspection discovered that the ride operator accidentally pushed a button controlling the seat positions while the ride was in motion. That button was later modified to only work when the ride is stopped.

== See also ==
- Batwing (roller coaster), a now-defunct Vekoma Flying Dutchman at Six Flags America
- Firehawk (roller coaster), a now-defunct Vekoma Flying Dutchman at Kings Island
