= Ghoster Coaster =

Ghoster Coaster may refer to:

- Ghoster Coaster (Canada's Wonderland), a junior wooden roller coaster
- Ghoster Coaster (Kings Dominion), a wooden roller coaster located at Kings Dominion in Virginia
- Woodstock Express (Carowinds), a wooden roller coaster located at Carowinds in North Carolina
- Scooby's Ghoster Coaster, a roller coaster that once stood at Kings Island, Ohio
