= Batwing (roller coaster) =

Defunct steel flying roller coaster

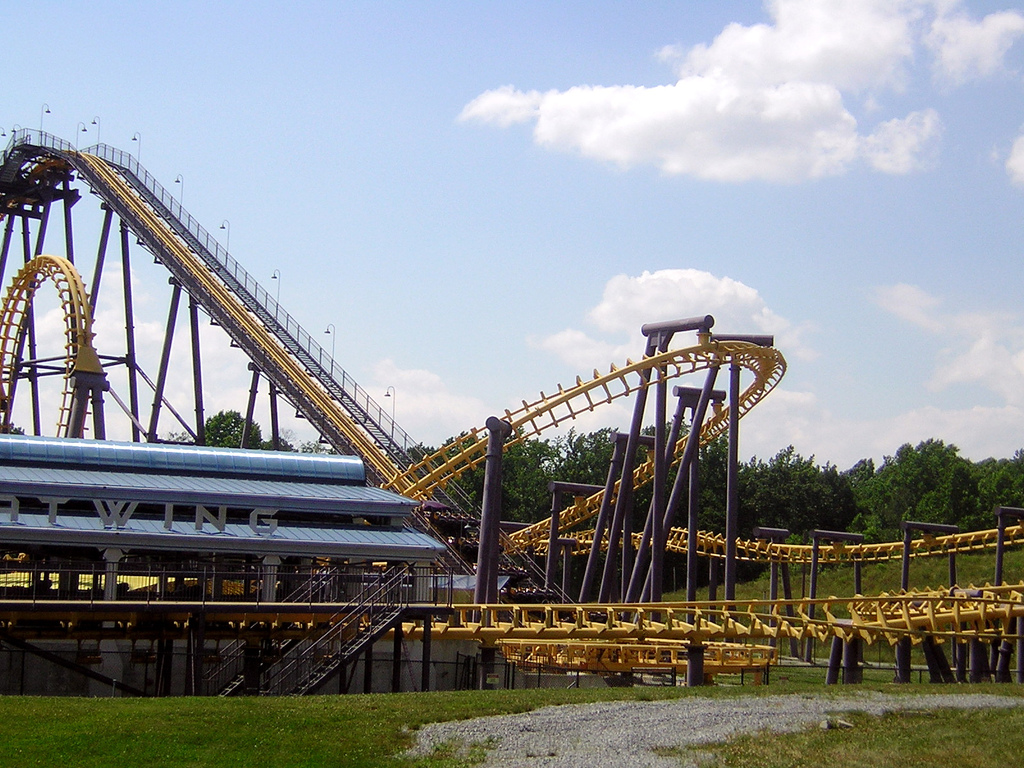

Six Flags America
- Location: Six Flags America
- Park section: Gotham City
- Coordinates: 38°54′37″N 76°46′43″W
- Status: Closed
- Opening date: June 16, 2001
- Closing date: July 8, 2025

General statistics
- Type: Steel – Flying
- Manufacturer: Vekoma
- Designer: Vekoma
- Model: Flying Dutchman (1018m)
- Lift/launch system: Chain lift hill
- Height: 115 ft (35 m)
- Drop: 103 ft (31 m)
- Length: 3,340 ft (1,020 m)
- Speed: 50 mph (80 km/h)
- Inversions: 5
- Duration: 2:02
- Max vertical angle: 33°
- Capacity: 850 riders per hour
- G-force: 4.3
- Height restriction: 54–78 in (137–198 cm)
- Trains: 2 trains with 6 cars; riders arranged 4 across in a single row for a total of 24 riders per train
- Flash Pass was Available
- Batwing at RCDB

Batwing was a steel flying roller coaster built by Vekoma at Six Flags America in Prince George's County, Maryland. The ride was a clone of the now-defunct Firehawk at Kings Island, and similar to the also-defunct Nighthawk at Carowinds, however that ride had a slightly different ending, and different paint scheme. Batwing was the last operating Vekoma Flying Dutchman until its closure in 2025.

== History ==
In February 2001, it was confirmed that Six Flags America would be receiving Batwing. This attraction would be a Vekoma Flying Dutchman coaster themed to Batman. It would be built towards the back of the park in the Gotham City section. Although the ride was set to open in May 2001, the opening was delayed. On June 16, 2001, Batwing officially opened to guests. It was the first flying roller coaster on the East Coast.

On May 1, 2025, Six Flags announced that the Six Flags America park would close at the end of the 2025 season on November 2, 2025. The status on the future of the Batwing roller coaster was not given at the time of the announcement.

On July 8, 2025, Batwing was closed indefinitely due to an accident involving the front decorative fiberglass part of the train falling off and shattering. No riders were injured. However, the ride closed immediately after the incident. On August 31, 2025, Batwing was removed from the Six Flags app and map. That September, the park announced that the coaster had been closed permanently, ahead of the park's scheduled permanent closure date. A sign was placed at the ride's entrance which stated "Soaring since 2001, this ride has taken its final flight. Thank you for the memories."

== Ride experience ==
=== Track ===
Batwing's entrance sign (2001)

The steel track was approximately 3,340 feet (1,020 m) in length and the height of the lift is approximately 115 feet (35 m).

Batwing had a total of five inversions. It featured one vertical loop, two inline twists, two "Lie to Fly" and two "Fly to Lie" elements. Each "Lie to Fly" and "Fly to Lie" element was counted as a half inversion. A "Lie to Fly" element was when riders are on their backs, facing the sky and they are flipped and face the ground. A "Fly to Lie" element was the opposite.

=== Layout ===
Once riders were seated and restrained, the train tilts backwards into a 'lay-down' position and dispatches. The train traveled backwards out of the station, turned left and traveled up the 115-foot (35 m) lift hill at a 33-degree angle. Once the train reached the top of the lift hill, it dipped down into a twist (called a "Lie-to-Fly") that turned the trains upside down into a flying position where riders face the ground. After the twist, the train traveled down the first drop, reaching speeds of 51 mph (82 km/h). Riders then go through an over banked Horseshoe Curve element. Following the Horseshoe, the train entered a "Fly-to-Lie" element that turns riders back to a lay-down position. After the banked turn, the ride enters the 66-foot (20 m) tall vertical loop, where riders experience 4.3 G's. The train then went into another "Lie-to-Fly" element. Following the loop, riders went through another turn and then hit two consecutive inline twists. Following the inline twists, the train entered the final helix. After the helix, riders hit the final "Fly-to-Lie" element and the train was slowed down on the brake run.

=== Trains ===
Batwing operated with two trains. Each train had six cars that had four seats in a single row for a total of 24 riders. It originally operated with three trains but was reduced to two in 2007. Riders are secured by a vest over the chest and a lap bar.

== See also ==
- Nighthawk (roller coaster) - a similar ride formerly located at sister park Carowinds
- Firehawk (roller coaster) - a clone formerly located at Kings Island
