= Scooby's Ghoster Coaster =

Defunct roller coaster

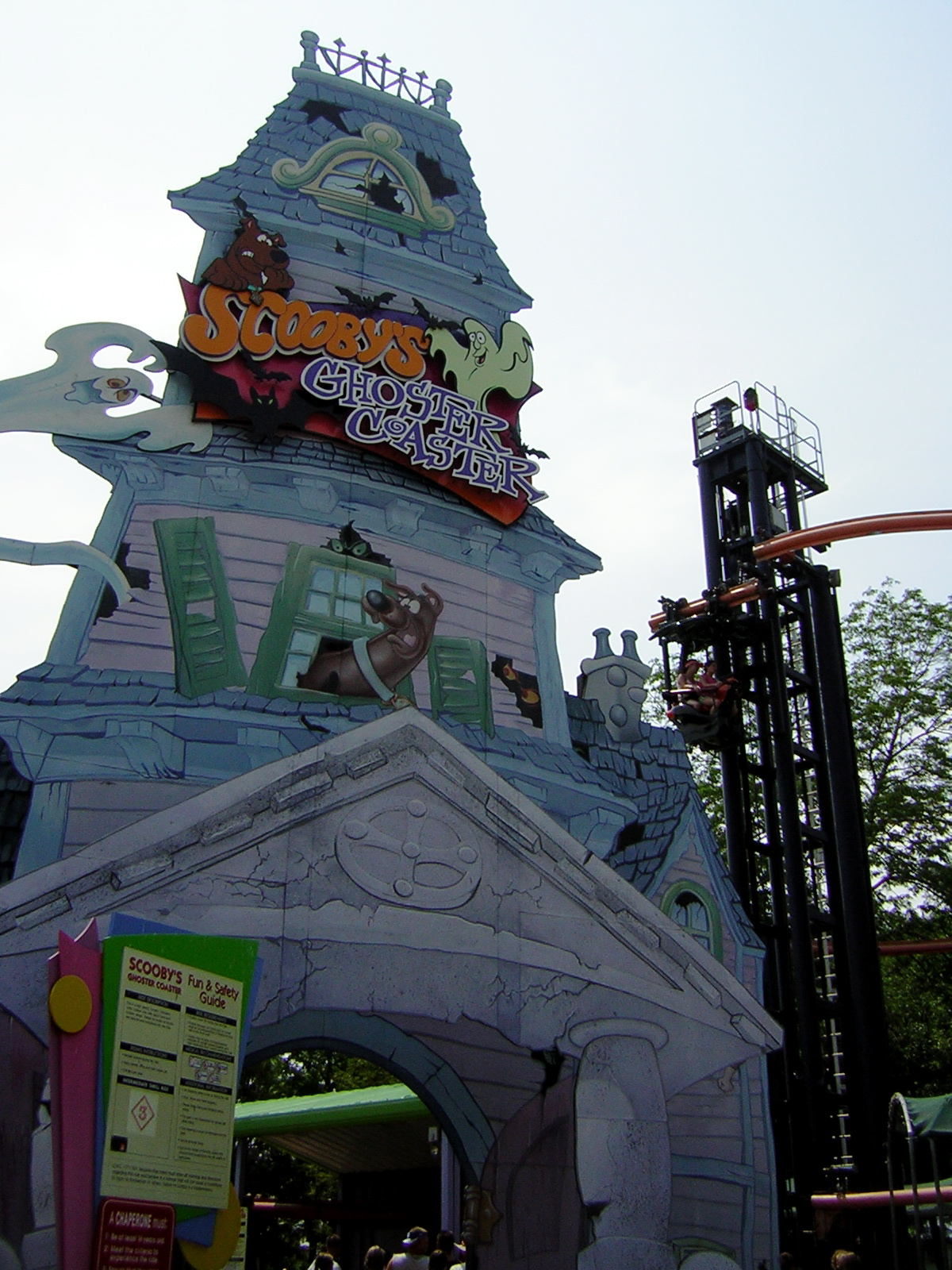

Kings Island
- Location: Kings Island
- Park section: Hanna-Barbera Land
- Coordinates: 39.342289°N 84.269851°W
- Status: Removed
- Opening date: April 18, 1998
- Closing date: 2005
- Replaced by: Surf Dog

General statistics
- Type: Steel – Suspended
- Manufacturer: Caripro
- Model: Batflyer
- Lift/launch system: Elevator lift
- Height: 35 ft (11 m)
- Speed: 8 mph (13 km/h)
- Duration: 0:50
- G-force: 1.0
- Height restriction: 36 in (91 cm)
- Trains: Several trains with a single car; riders arranged 1 across in 2 rows for a total of 2 riders per train
- Scooby's Ghoster Coaster at RCDB

Scooby's Ghoster Coaster was a suspended roller coaster at Kings Island in Mason, Ohio. Opened in 1998, it was billed as the first suspended roller coaster in the United States designed for children. The ride is also the first in the country from Caripro Amusement Technology, a defunct company once based out of the Netherlands and later bought by Vekoma. Scooby's Ghoster Coaster was removed in the 2005-2006 off-season to make room for other rides during the area's conversion from Hanna-Barbera Land to Nickelodeon Universe.

== History ==
Hanna-Barbera Land underwent a major refurbishment for the 1998 season. This included an area expansion, an improved entrance, and new attractions. Scooby's Ghoster Coaster, a suspended roller coaster based on the Scooby-Doo franchise, was among the new rides. The area's other children coaster, Scooby Zoom, was renamed Top Cat's Taxi Jam.

Scooby's Ghoster Coaster officially opened to the public on April 18, 1998. It was closed in 2005.

== See also ==
- Ghoster Coaster (disambiguation)
- Woodstock Express, another Kings Island roller coaster originally named "Scooby Doo"
