= Firehawk (roller coaster) =

Former roller coaster at Kings Island

- Previously known as X-Flight at Six Flags Worlds of Adventure/Geauga Lake (2001–2006)
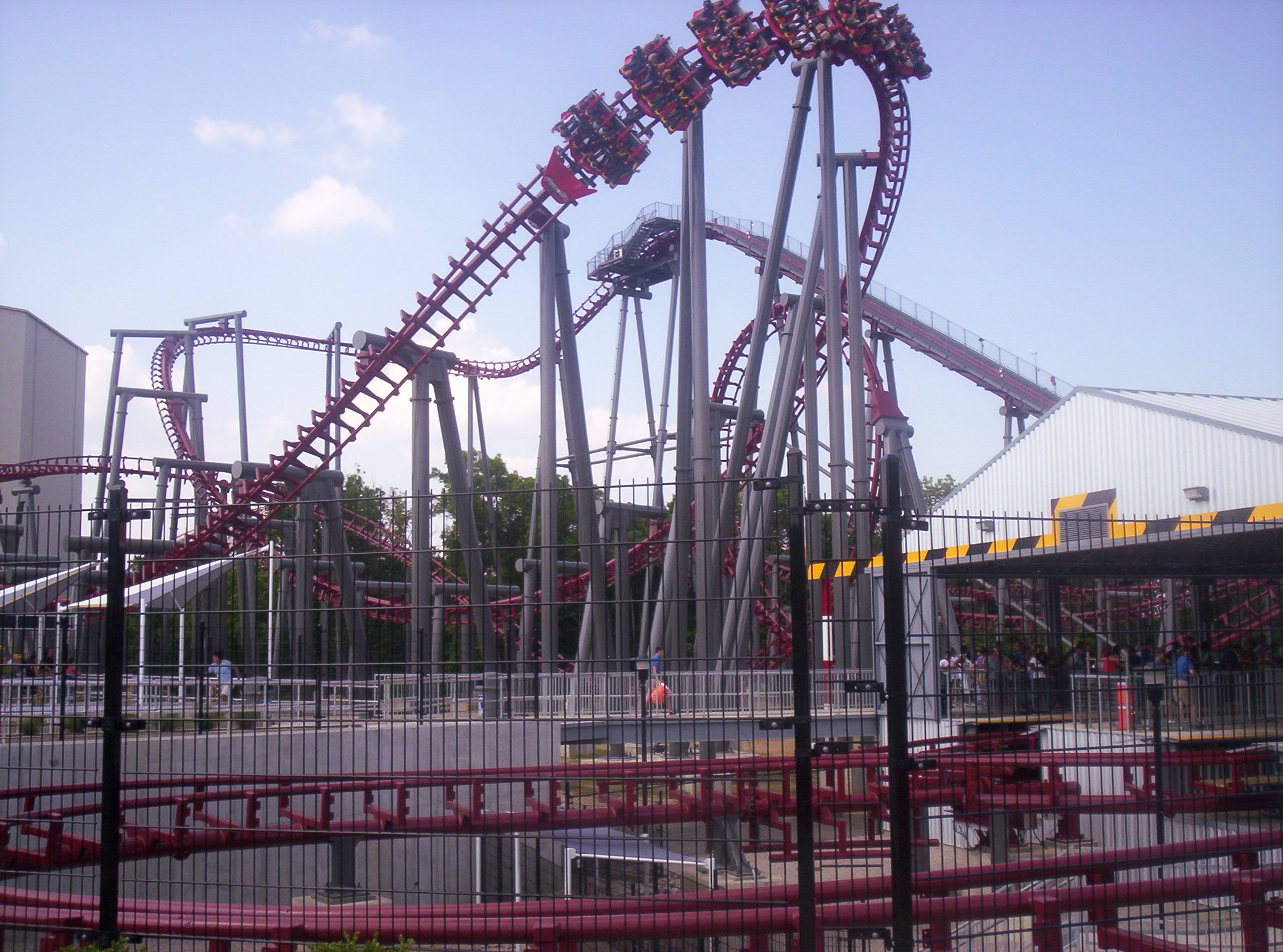
- Firehawk in 2007

Kings Island
- Park section: Coney Mall - X-Base
- Coordinates: 39°20′33.84″N 84°15′45.82″W
- Status: Removed
- Opening date: May 26, 2007
- Closing date: October 28, 2018
- Replaced by: Orion

Geauga Lake
- Park section: 50's Midway
- Coordinates: 41.3509°N 81.3802°W
- Status: Removed
- Soft opening date: May 24, 2001
- Opening date: May 26, 2001
- Closing date: September 17, 2006
- Cost: US$15 million

General statistics
- Type: Steel – Flying
- Manufacturer: Vekoma
- Model: Flying Dutchman (1018m)
- Lift/launch system: Chain lift hill
- Height: 115 ft (35 m)
- Length: 3,340 ft (1,020 m)
- Speed: 50 mph (80 km/h)
- Inversions: 5
- Duration: 2:10
- Max vertical angle: 33°
- Capacity: 520 riders per hour
- G-force: 4.3
- Height restriction: 54–80 in (137–203 cm)
- Trains: 2 trains with 6 cars; riders arranged 4 across in a single row for a total of 24 riders per train
- Fast Lane Plus was available
- Firehawk at RCDB

Firehawk was a flying roller coaster located at Kings Island in Mason, Ohio. Manufactured by Vekoma, it originally opened as X-Flight at Six Flags Worlds of Adventure on May 26, 2001, billed as the Midwest's first and only flying roller coaster. Cedar Fair purchased Worlds of Adventure in 2004 and began efforts to downsize the park. X-Flight was relocated to Kings Island following the 2006 season, where it reopened as Firehawk on May 26, 2007.

The roller coaster's layout was identical to the now-defunct Batwing, another Vekoma Flying Dutchman model, located at Six Flags America. Firehawk closed permanently on October 28, 2018, and was later demolished. On August 15, 2019, it was announced that Firehawk would be replaced by a new Bolliger & Mabillard coaster named Orion, a giga coaster that opened in 2020.

== History ==
=== Six Flags Worlds of Adventure/Geauga Lake (2001–2006) ===
When Geauga Lake was known as Six Flags Ohio, plans for a new roller coaster known as X-Flight were revealed on January 4, 2001. Six days later, Six Flags purchased SeaWorld Ohio – next to Geauga Lake – and merged the two to create Six Flags Worlds of Adventure. X-Flight was advertised as the first flying roller coaster in the Midwest, and it was the park's tenth roller coaster overall – the fifth added since 2000. The new coaster was built on a former bus parking lot, and Geauga Lake Road had to be rerouted around the ride. Regarding the design of the attraction, Jake Bateman, Vice President and General Manager of Six Flags Worlds of Adventure, said:

X-Flight will be so thrilling and so unique that a new category far above ultimate will have to be created to describe the experience. There is nothing to compare it to in Ohio or the Midwest, for that matter.

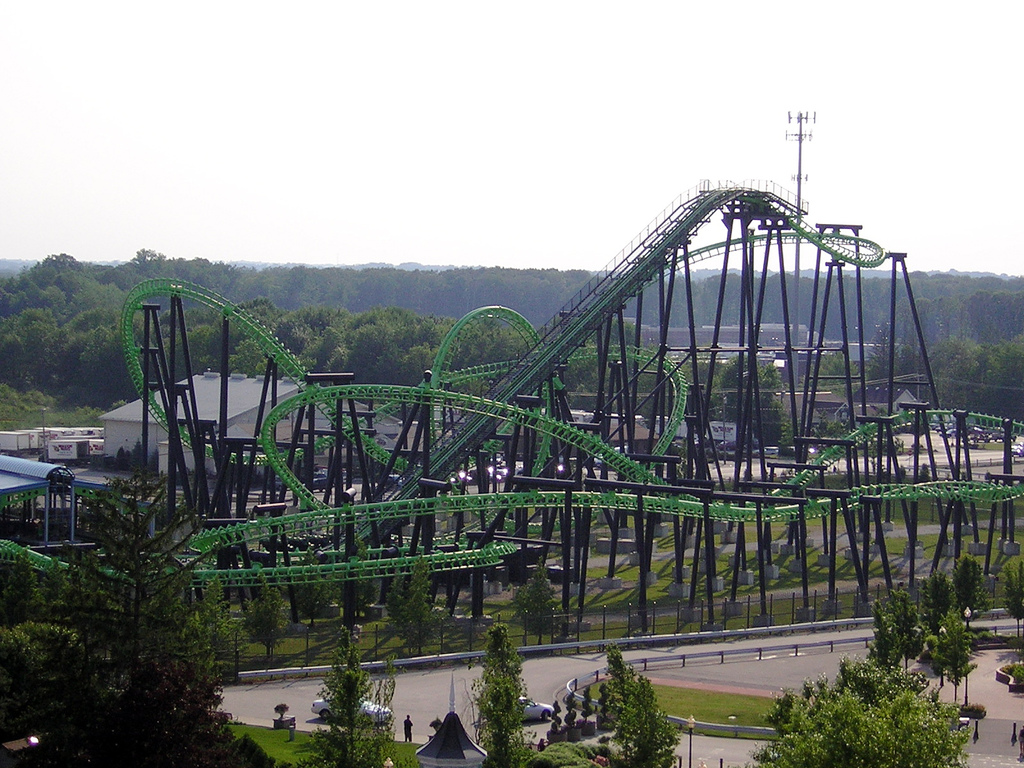
X-Flight at Geauga Lake

Land clearing began on December 1, 2000, and construction on the footers began February 9, 2001. X-Flight was originally intended to open on May 5, but due to technical difficulties, its opening was delayed. During testing, problems were discovered with several devices, including the reclining mechanism on the trains and their restraints. X-Flight's media day was eventually held on May 24, 2001, and the ride officially opened two days later on May 26.

Cedar Fair purchased the park from Six Flags in 2004 for $145 million. They announced intentions of returning the park to its roots as a family-oriented amusement park. The efforts to downsize the park eventually led to X-Flight's removal. On November 22, 2006, Geauga Lake park officials announced that X-Flight was being dismantled to be moved to another unspecified Cedar Fair property. Moving the ride would take several months, as the final sections of track and supports wouldn't be removed until March 2007.

=== Kings Island (2007–2018) ===
On January 22, 2007, green Vekoma track resembling the track of X-Flight was spotted at Kings Island, a Cedar Fair park in Mason, Ohio. On February 5, 2007, Kings Island officially announced Firehawk as the former X-Flight roller coaster from Geauga Lake. Construction was scheduled to begin later that month, and the opening was set for Memorial Day weekend later that year. X-Flight's neon green track and dark blue supports were re-painted red and steel gray, respectively. It was built in an area next to Flight of Fear, creating a new area named X-Base which connects to nearby area Coney Mall via a walkway under Racer's lift hill. Firehawk officially opened as scheduled on May 26, 2007. It was the first roller coaster to be introduced at the park since Cedar Fair purchased it from Paramount Parks in 2006. The first 2,500 riders received commemorative Firehawk t-shirts.

On September 27, 2018, Kings Island announced that Firehawk would close permanently on October 28, 2018. The ride was demolished prior to the 2019 season. Firehawk's trains were shipped to Carowinds to be used as spare parts for Nighthawk. In 2020, Firehawk was replaced with a giga coaster named Orion. The former photo booth was reused as the new coaster's entrance.

== Ride experience ==
=== Track ===
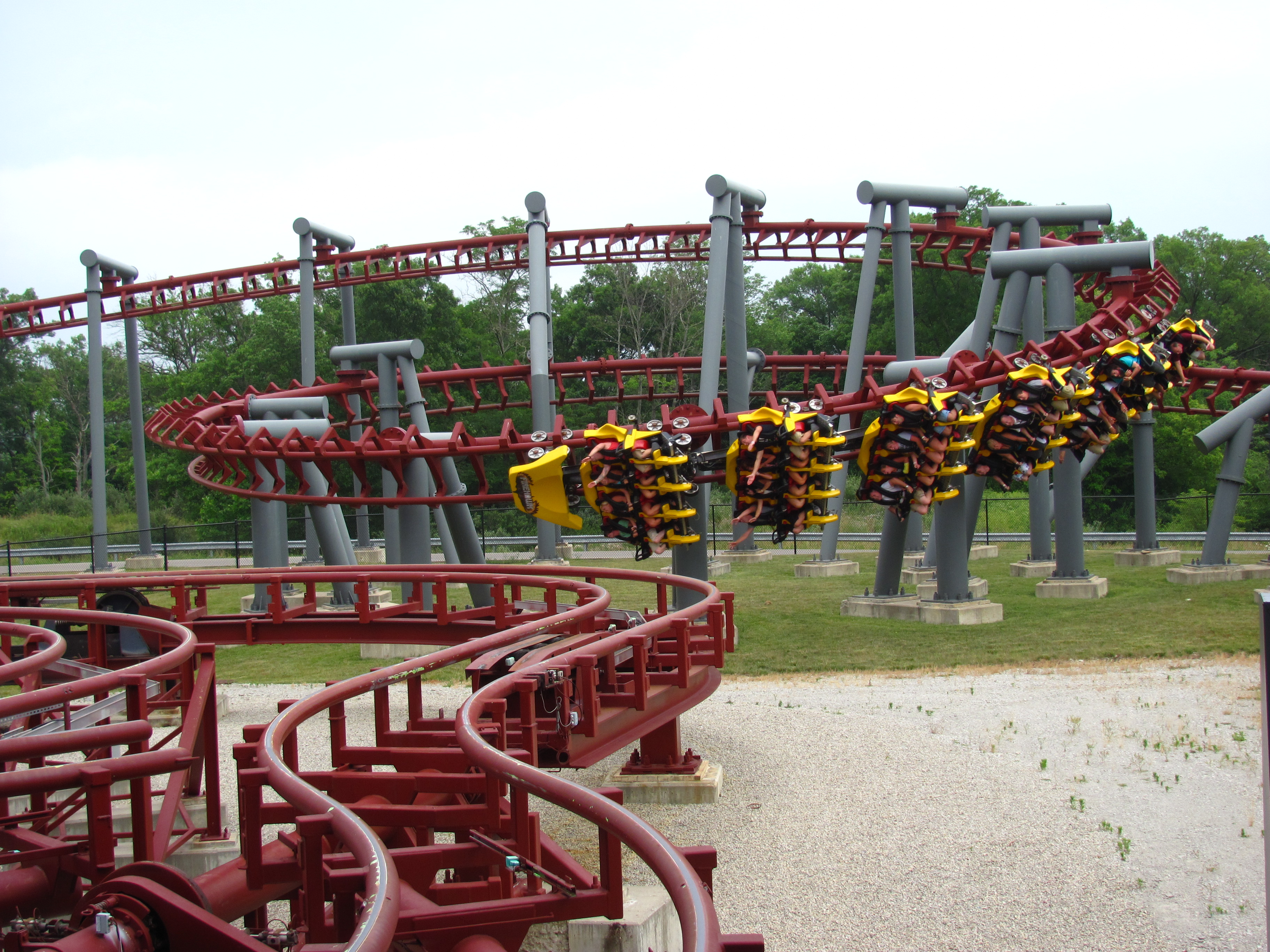
Train in final helix

The steel track was 3,340 feet (1,020 m) in length, and the height of the lift hill was 115 feet (35 m). There were approximately 300 sections of track colored red, with steel gray supports. When the ride operated at Geauga Lake, the track was neon green with dark blue supports.

Firehawk had a total of five inversions – one vertical loop, two inline twists, and four 180-degree inline twists that were each counted as a half inversion. These 180-degree inline twists were also known as "Lie-to-Fly" and "Fly-to-Lie" elements, in which riders on their backs were flipped to face the ground or vice versa.

=== Layout ===
Once riders were seated and restrained, the train was tilted backwards into a 'lay-down' position and dispatched. The train traveled backwards out of the station, turned left and traveled up the 115-foot (35 m) lift hill at a 33-degree angle. Once the train reached the top of the lift hill, it dipped down into a twist (called a "Lie-to-Fly") that turned the trains upside down into a flying position where riders faced the ground. After the twist, the train traveled down the first drop, reaching speeds of 51 mph (82 km/h). Riders then proceeded through an over banked horseshoe curve element, passing the queue area. Following the horseshoe, the train entered a "Fly-to-Lie" element that turned riders back to a lay-down position. After the banked turn, the ride entered the 66-foot (20 m) tall vertical loop, where riders experience 4.3 Gs. The train then went into another "Lie-to-Fly" element. Following the loop, riders entered another turn and hit two consecutive inline twists. Following the inline twists, the train entered the final helix followed by the final "Fly-to-Lie" element. Afterwards, the train was slowed to a stop on the brake run before returning to the station.

=== Station ===
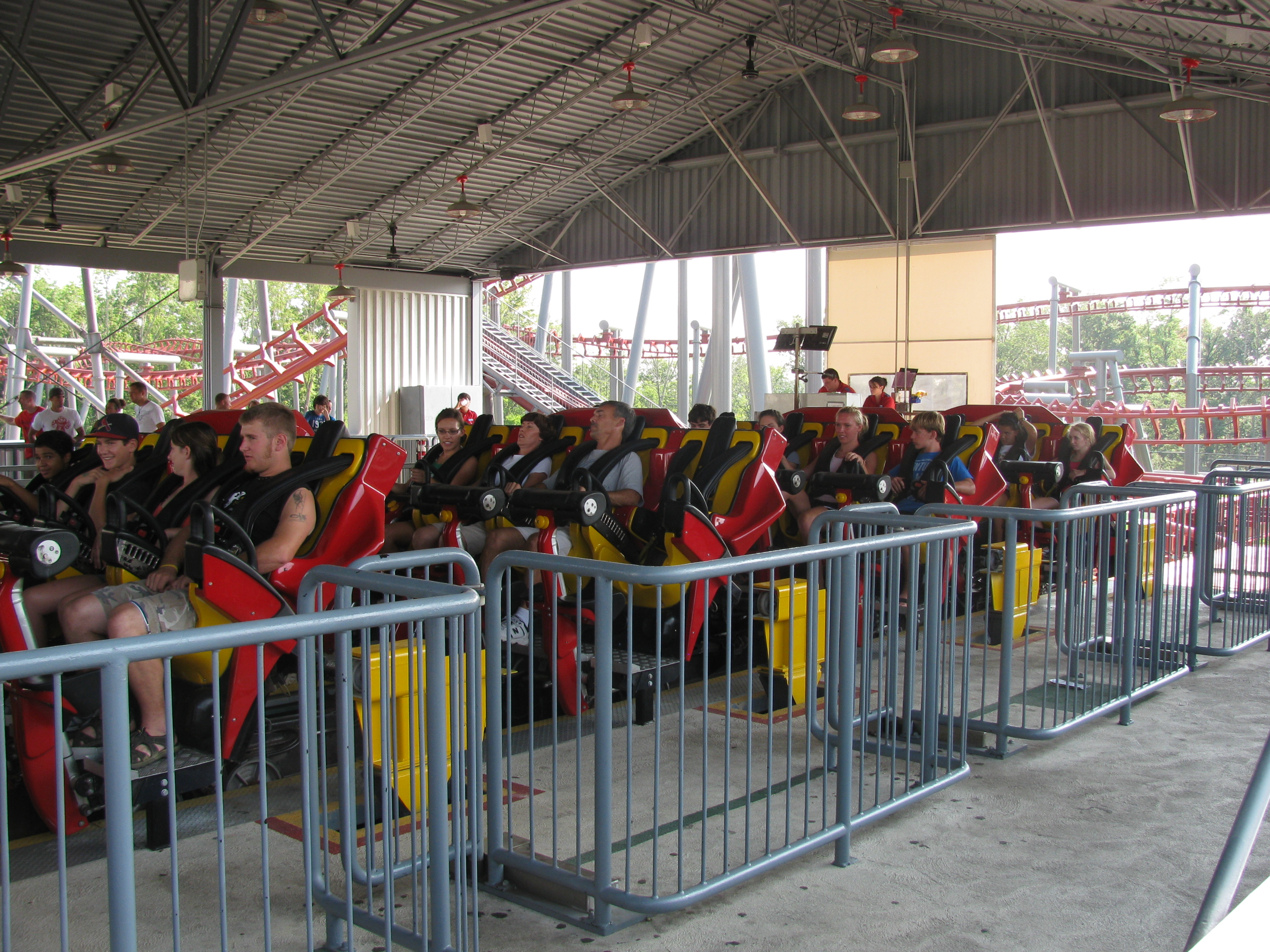
Firehawk's red train in the station

The coaster featured a dual station which was connected to the main track using a switch track segment (similar to a railroad switch). Dual-station operation allowed for two trains to be loaded simultaneously for more efficient operation. This configuration has existed since the ride debuted at Geauga Lake.

=== Trains ===
Firehawk operated with two trains. There were six cars with four seats in each row for a total of 24 riders per train. There were three trains during the ride's first year at Geauga Lake, however only two were used since. The third train became a parts donor for the first two. Originally, riders reclined on the lift hill, rather than in the station, and returned to an upright position prior to re-entering the station. However, this was changed to occur in the station due to problems that arose during the ride's first season. The trains featured the Firehawk logo on the front colored yellow and red. At Geauga Lake, the X-Flight logo was featured on the trains.

== Incident ==
On August 8, 2009, an adult male passenger was rushed to a hospital after he was found with breathing problems following the ride. He died the same evening. The Hamilton County Coroner's Office reported that a heart condition was the likely cause of death and ruled it a natural cause. The ride was re-opened at 12:10 pm on August 9, 2009, after an inspection by the Ohio Department of Agriculture – a division of the state government responsible for amusement park ride safety in Ohio. They determined the ride was operating within the manufacturer's specifications.

== Gallery ==
=== Geauga Lake ===
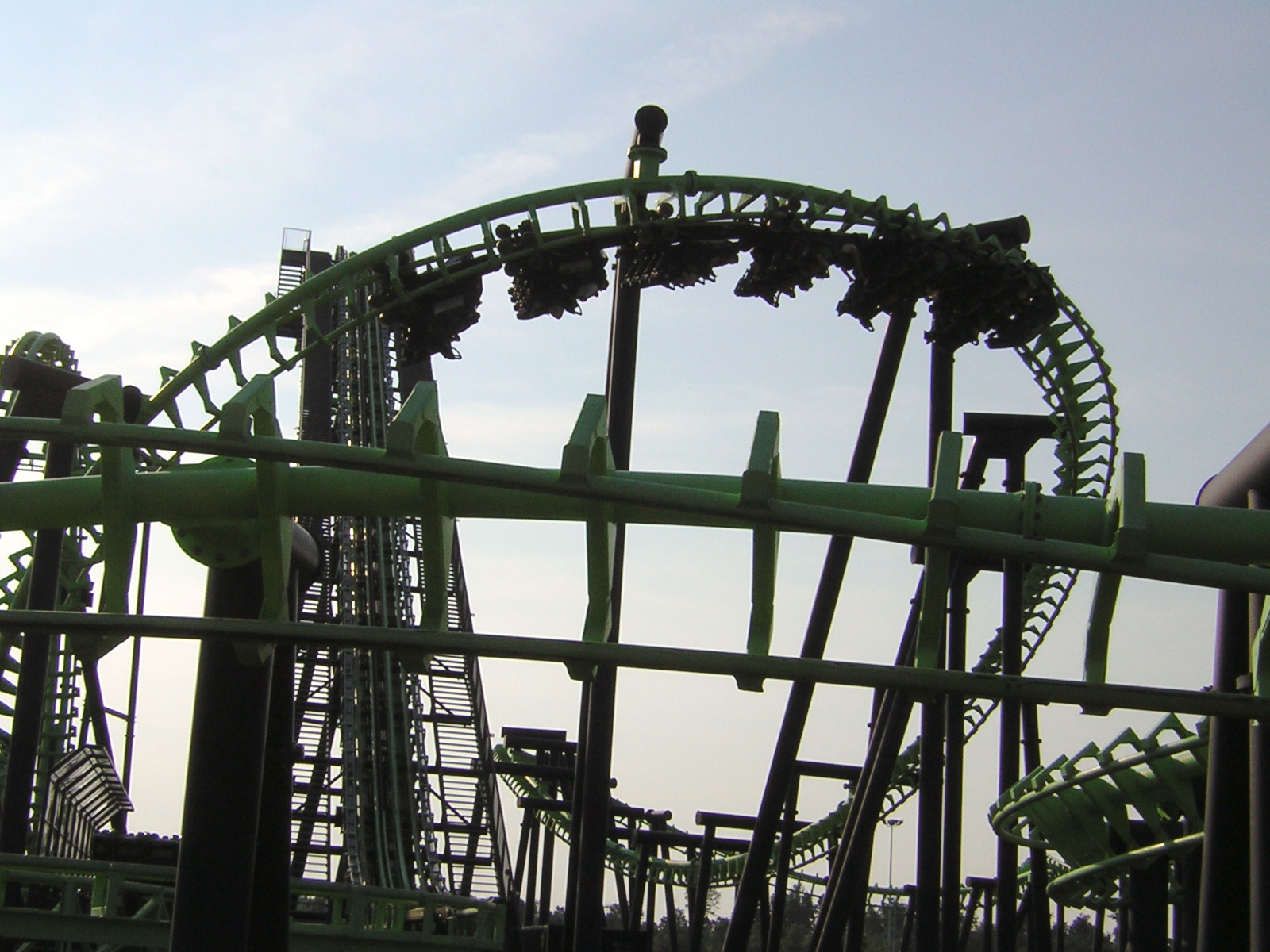

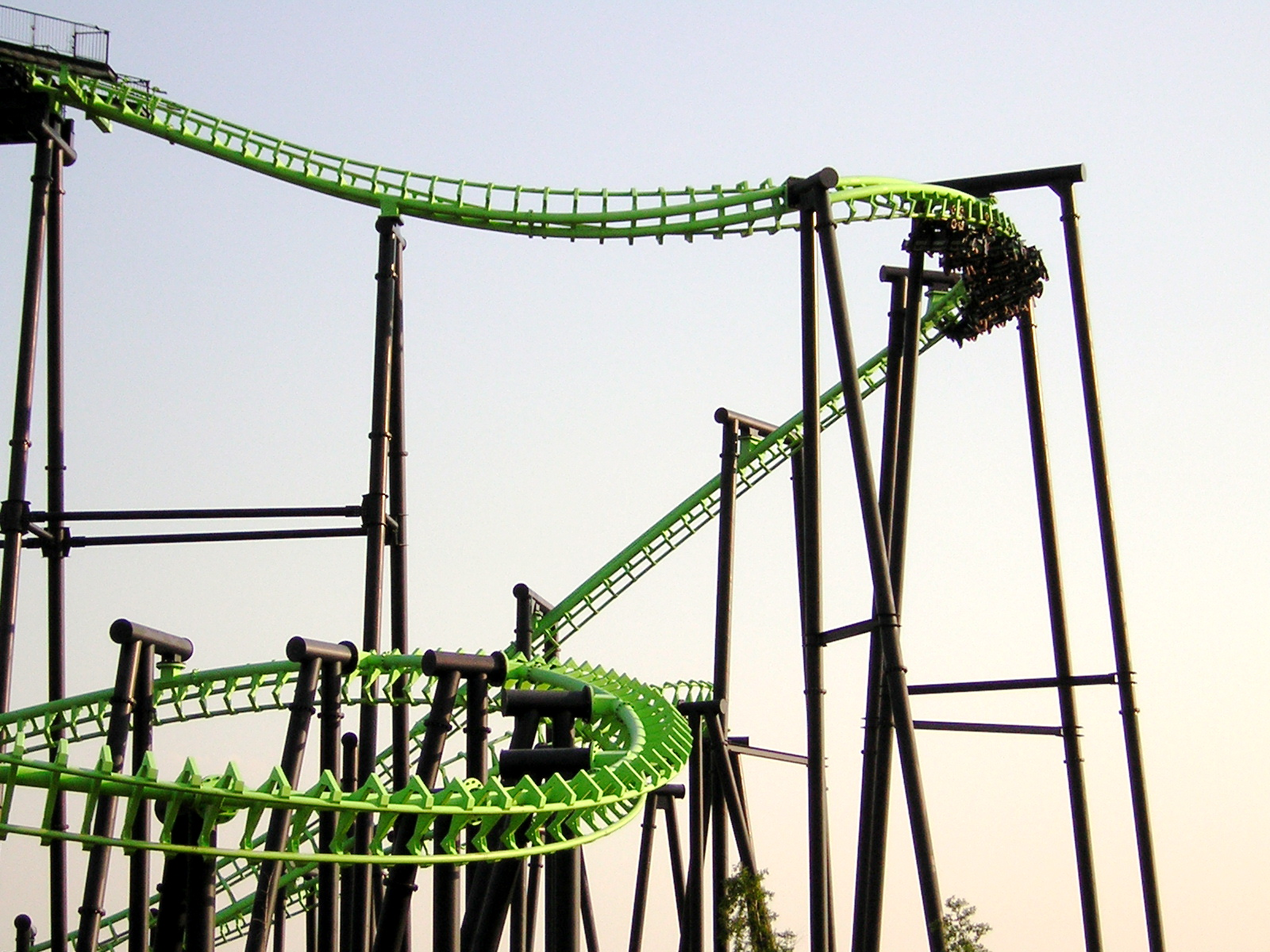

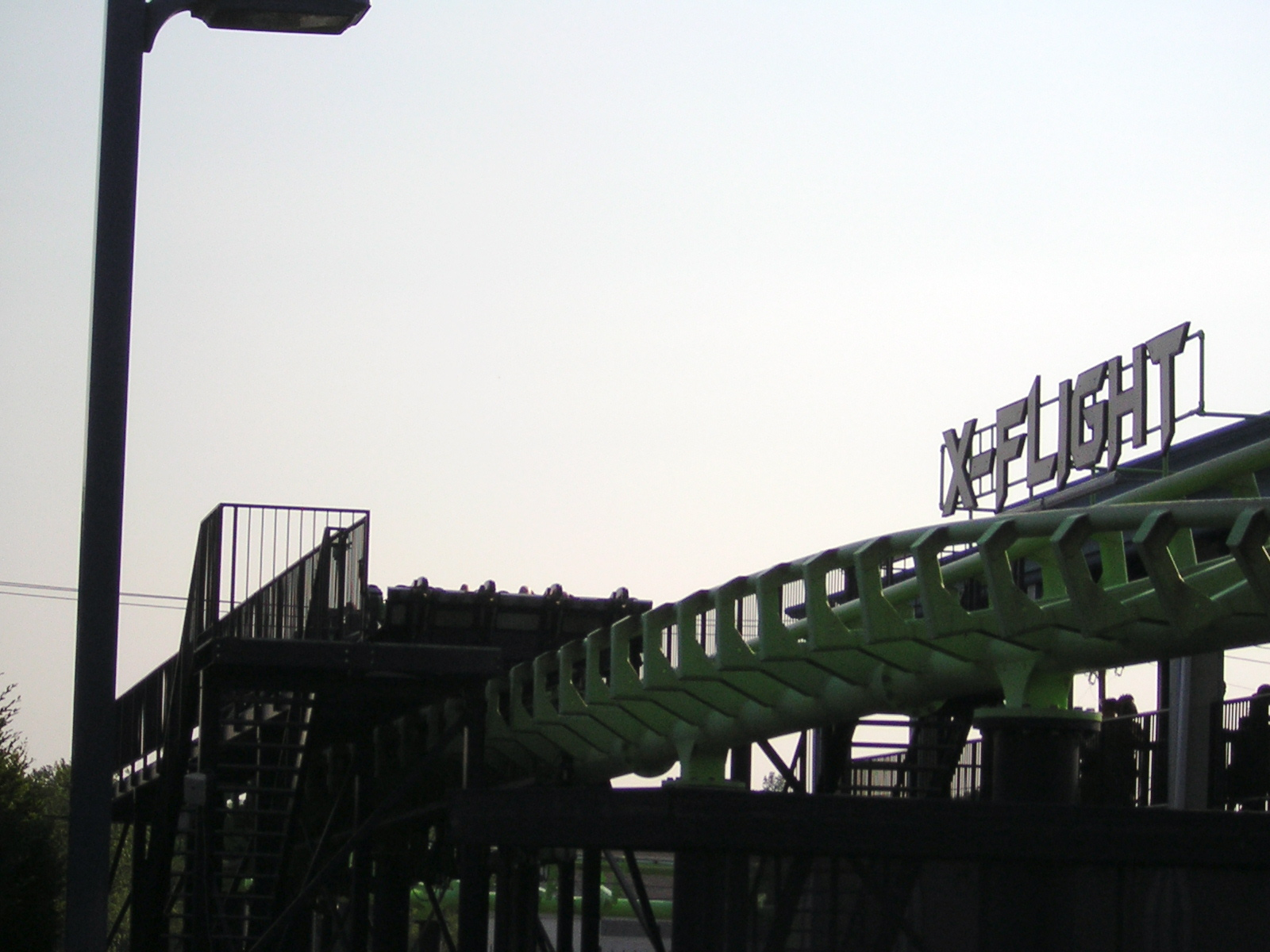

=== Kings Island ===
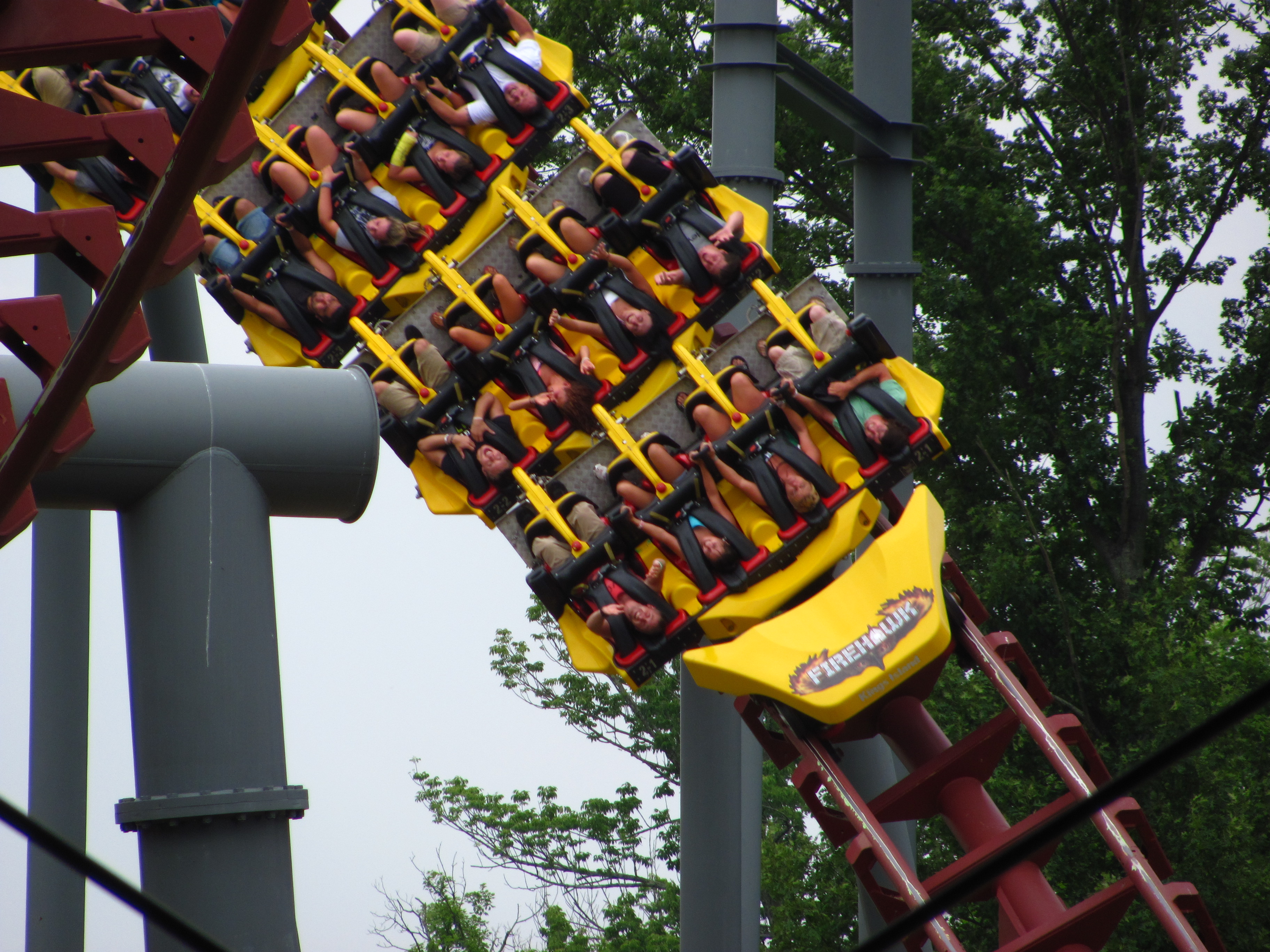

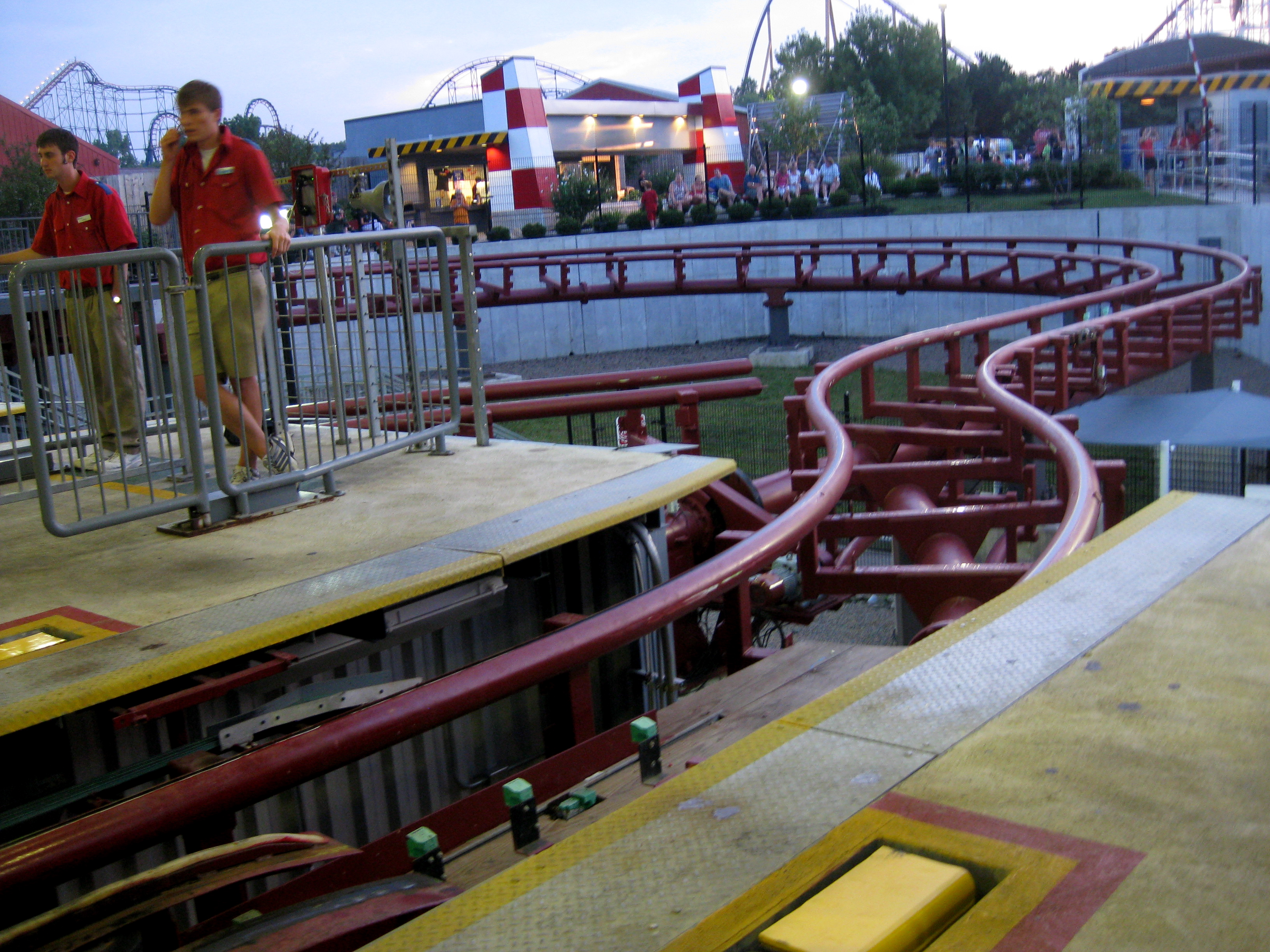

== See also ==
- Nighthawk (roller coaster), a Vekoma Flying Dutchman formerly at Carowinds
- Batwing (roller coaster), an identical version of Firehawk formerly at Six Flags America
