= Adventure Express =

Amusement ride

Kings Island
- Location: Kings Island
- Park section: Adventure Port
- Coordinates: 39.344462°N 84.264777°W
- Status: Operating
- Opening date: April 13, 1991
- Cost: $4 million

General statistics
- Type: Steel – Mine Train
- Manufacturer: Arrow Dynamics
- Model: Mine Train
- Lift/launch system: Two chain lift hills
- Height: 63 ft (19 m)
- Length: 2,963 ft (903 m)
- Speed: 35 mph (56 km/h)
- Inversions: 0
- Duration: 2:20
- Capacity: 1600 riders per hour
- G-force: 2.7
- Height restriction: 48 in (122 cm)
- Trains: 3 trains with 5 cars; riders arranged 2 across in 3 rows for a total of 30 riders per train
- Fast Lane available
- Adventure Express at RCDB

Adventure Express is a mine train roller coaster located in the Adventure Port section at Kings Island amusement park in Mason, Ohio. Manufactured by Arrow Dynamics, the roller coaster opened to the public on April 13, 1991. A portion of the ride's design drew inspiration from the Indiana Jones franchise. Similar to other mine trains, the Adventure Express uses a lap bar restraint and does not feature any inversions.

== History ==
Kings Island approached Arrow Dynamics and one of its lead designers, Ron Toomer, in 1990 to build a traditional mine train roller coaster with a unique twist. Unlike previous Arrow installations, this one would be more heavily-themed and produce an "out-of-control feeling" inspired by scenes from the 1984 film Indiana Jones and the Temple of Doom. Construction began later that year, and the total cost to build the family ride was estimated at $4 million. The ride was marketed as a jungle adventure mine train that plunges "through steamy volcanic tunnels, across rickety bridges, and into a deserted mine shaft inhabited by snakes and spiders". The roller coaster opened on April 13, 1991. For the 2023 season, Kings Island rethemed the Oktoberfest section of the park and renamed it Adventure Port, adding enhanced theming to Adventure Express during the transition.

== Ride description ==
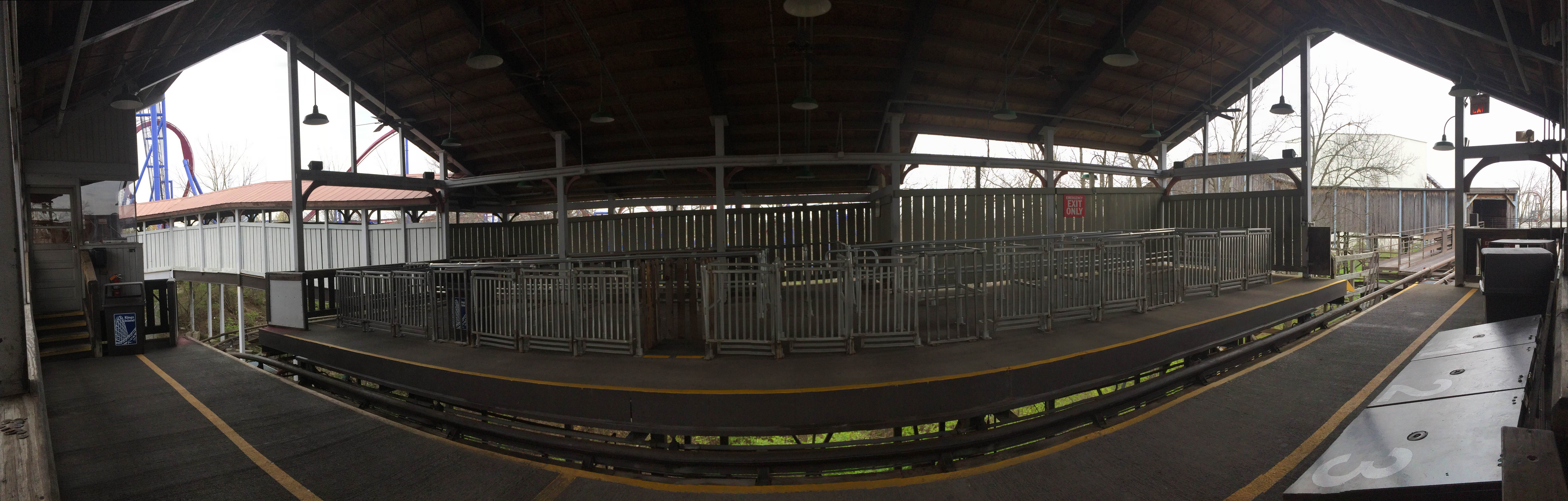
Adventure Express Station (Panorama)

As the train leaves the station, it makes a small turn right followed by a small turn left. The train then dips into a slightly banked turn to the right through a jungle-themed tunnel labeled with a large sign reading "Track Closed". After exiting, the train moves over a brake run that slows the train on its way through a second tunnel, where the train makes a sharp, 90-degree turn to the left into the roller coaster's first lift hill. It exits the tunnel at the beginning of the ascent, where a skeleton wearing a safari outfit is seen perched to the right with a spear through the chest and a snake wrapped around its neck. Riders pass under several wooden beams, each featuring a tiki-themed face mounted at the center.

After reaching the top, the train makes a short dip before descending quickly down a winding 270-degree turn to the right. The turn ends with a short dip followed by an ascending 90-degree turn to the left. At the crest of the turn, the train descends again through a slightly banked turn to the right. After leveling out, riders experience another slightly banked turn to the left into the coaster's third tunnel. As the train exits, the turn switches to the right and is followed by two ascending left turns that lead into the final tunnel. A second brake run slows the train inside as it enters the second lift hill, which is completely enclosed. Large stone warrior statues in several rows with glowing eyes can be seen lining both sides during the ascent. Their arms move in sync rhythmically with clenched fists that are seemingly pounding down towards riders. At the top of the hill is a centrally mounted stone warrior with sharply lit eyes appearing to pour a vat of lava – a stationary lit object – on riders as they pass underneath. The train takes a short dip when exiting the tunnel, and turns to the right into the final brake run before returning to the station.

== Theme ==
Adventure Express is themed to a treasure hunting adventure reminiscent of the film Raiders of the Lost Ark from the Indiana Jones franchise. During the years the park was owned by Paramount Parks, the film's theme music could be heard in the line queue with the voice of a station master welcoming "archaeologists and explorers". Throughout the course of the ride, a variety of sounds imitating the setting of a rainforest are projected around riders as they pass through different areas on the ride. In the final tunnel during the train's ascent, an ominous voice speaks over a haunting musical track stating, "You have disturbed the forbidden temple. Now you will pay!"

Some special effects have since been removed, including the Indiana Jones theme music with commentary that once played in the line queue. The voice along with some lighting effects in the final tunnel were also no longer present as of August 20, 2015.

In 2023 with the addition of Adventure Port, the ride's theming was returned and enhanced. Now themed to the Arrow Cargo Co. explorers don their hats to take a scenic tour. However, the "right track" has been broken and explorers set off on their adventure passing by a derailed train, through three tunnels, and right into the finale; a second lift hill to be warned by the statue up top, "You have disturbed the forbidden temple, Now you will pay!" before being set back off onto the "right track." The Station Master congratulates explorers, "Well done explorers, and remember the Adventure Express is always on the right track!" The station now also included enhanced theming including; a "news" track giving updates about the route, route lists, barrels, luggage, posters, and more.
