= Orion (roller coaster) =

Steel roller coaster at Kings Island

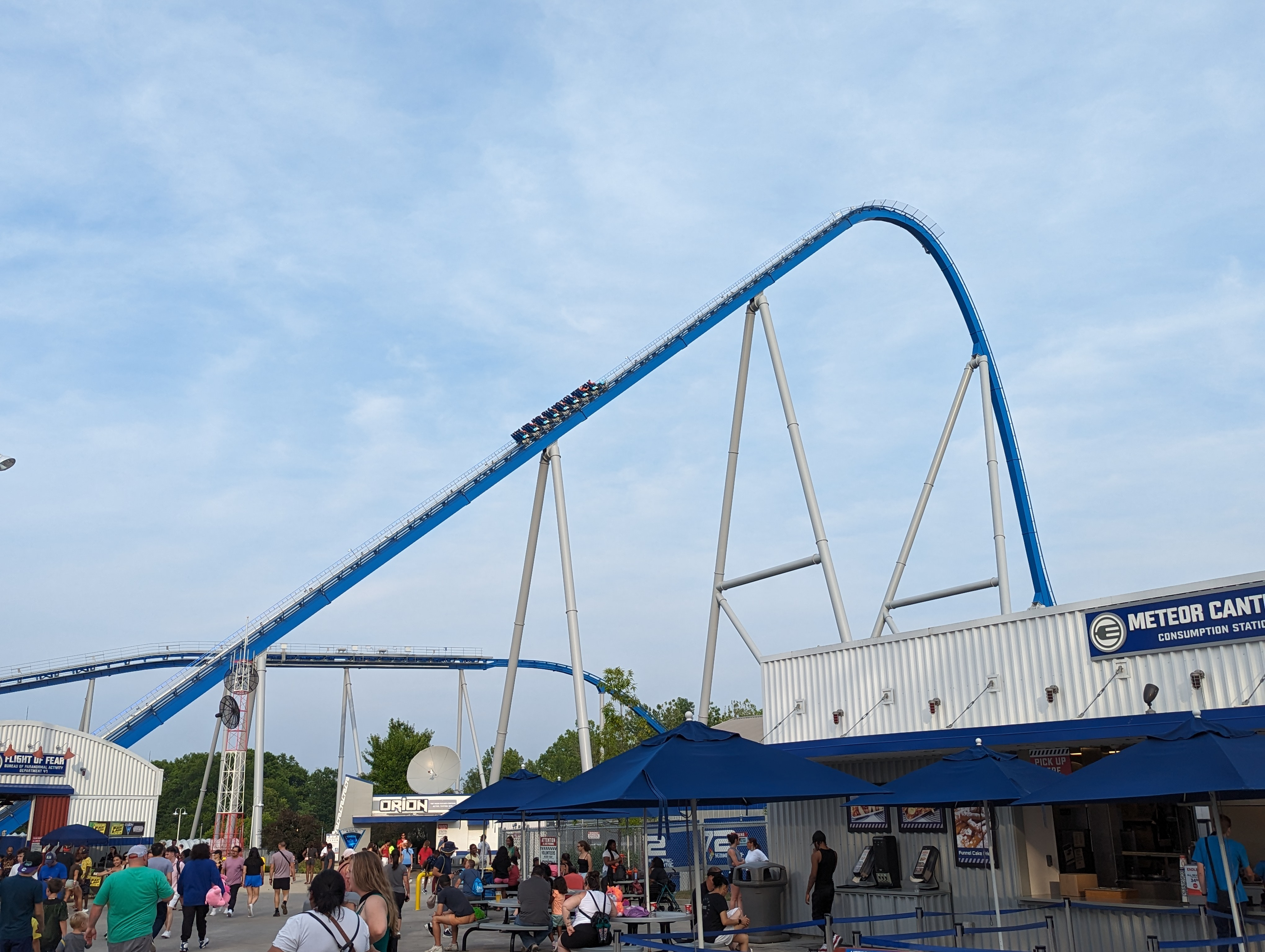
- Orion's lift hill and first drop

Kings Island
- Location: Kings Island
- Park section: Area 72
- Coordinates: 39°20′33.84″N 84°15′45.82″W
- Status: Operating
- Soft opening date: July 1, 2020
- Opening date: July 2, 2020
- Cost: $31 million
- Replaced: Firehawk; Dinosaurs Alive!

General statistics
- Type: Steel
- Manufacturer: Bolliger & Mabillard
- Model: Hyper Coaster (Note: B&M's official website later categorized 300-foot installations, including Orion and Fury 325, under a dedicated "Giga Coaster" section, but they were developed as part of the Hyper Coaster model line.)
- Lift/launch system: Chain lift hill
- Height: 287 ft (87 m)
- Drop: 300 ft (91 m)
- Length: 5,321 ft (1,622 m)
- Speed: 91 mph (146 km/h)
- Inversions: 0
- Duration: 3:00
- Max vertical angle: 85°
- Capacity: 1,650 riders per hour
- Height restriction: 54 in (137 cm)
- Trains: 3 trains with 8 cars; riders arranged 4 across in a single row for a total of 32 riders per train
- Fast Lane available
- Orion at RCDB

Orion (/ɒrˈaɪˈɪn/) is a steel roller coaster located at Kings Island amusement park in Mason, Ohio. The Hyper Coaster model was manufactured by Bolliger & Mabillard and became the seventh giga coaster in the world when it opened to the public on July 2, 2020. At the time, Orion was the largest investment in the park's history, costing $31 million to construct. The coaster stands 287 feet (87 m), features a 300-foot drop (91 m), and reaches a maximum speed of 91 mph (146 km/h). It is situated in the Area 72 section of the park on a site formerly occupied by Firehawk.

== History ==
In early 2019, Kings Island submitted construction blueprints to the City of Mason for approval. Dennis Speigel, a former park executive who helped with the transition from Coney Island to Kings Island in the early 1970s, speculated that the blueprints revealed a likely height estimate of at least 300 feet (91 m), qualifying it as a giga coaster. The plans were approved on April 24, 2019. Cedar Fair also applied for national trademarks for the names Orion and Polaris. On August 15, 2019, Kings Island held an evening event open to both the media and public that officially announced the new coaster as Orion. It was confirmed to have a 300-foot drop (91 m), making it the seventh giga coaster in the world. The announcement also stated that the unofficial X-Base section of the park would be revamped and renamed Area 72 for the 2020 season.

In November 2019, Orion's train design was revealed at the annual International Association of Amusement Parks and Attractions (IAAPA) Amusement Expo in Orlando. Unlike previous train configurations from B&M that feature staggered, two-seat rows, Orion's trains were designed to seat four across in a straight line.

In February 2020, Orion successfully completed its first test run. It was originally scheduled to open on April 11, 2020, but due to the COVID-19 pandemic, the opening was postponed to July 2, 2020. A media preview event was held the previous day on July 1, 2020.

== Ride experience ==
=== Queue ===
Guests enter the Fort Mason Research Compound by walking through the entrance building, which was originally the Firehawk photo booth. The line starts with a zig-zag portion followed by a staircase. This leads to a large area with switchbacks and winding paths. There are some posters that are shown on a fence. A blue concrete pylon can be spotted in the area with a stamp that reads Radium XL-200, a reference to Magnum XL-200 at Cedar Point. The same pylons are seen near the Meteor Canteen restaurant. The stamps on these pylons read Metamorphic-VTBC, a reference to Volcano: The Blast Coaster at Kings Dominion, Igneous-12E, a reference to Disaster Transport at Cedar Point and Sedimentary-325, a reference to Fury 325 at Carowinds. Two buildings are seen in the queue that are labeled Outpost 87 and Outpost 07. Guests enter a research office, where a video informing riders of their "mission" is played is played on the screens. The area contains several lockers and office desks. A bulletin board can be found with references to other attractions, including Zodiac, Skylab, Vortex and Invertigo. Guests exit the research office and head into the station, where they board the ride.

=== Layout ===
After being dispatched from the station, the train climbs a 287-foot (87 m) chain lift hill. Upon reaching the peak, it drops 300 feet (91 m) at an 85-degree angle, reaching 91 mph (146 km/h). The train speeds through a 174-foot (53 m) banked airtime hill (or "wave turn") and a 202-foot (62 m) horseshoe. It then makes its way through a 56-foot (17 m) airtime hill. This is followed by a 147-foot (45 m) airtime hill with a trim brake. The train zooms through a 125-foot (38 m) spiral before passing the on-ride camera. Then, the train goes through a left turn into two more airtime hills measuring 90 feet (27 m) and 83 feet (25 m). Following this, the train slows down on the brake run, makes a left turn and returns to the station.

== Reception ==
On December 30, 2020, it was announced that Orion won the 2020 "Best New Amusement Park Attraction" in the USA TODAY 10Best National Readers' Poll.

Golden Ticket Awards: Top steel Roller Coasters
Year									1998	1999
Ranking									–	–
Year	2000	2001	2002	2003	2004	2005	2006	2007	2008	2009
Ranking	–	–	–	–	–	–	–	–	–	–
Year	2010	2011	2012	2013	2014	2015	2016	2017	2018	2019
Ranking	–	–	–	–	–	–	–	–	–	–
Year	2020	2021	2022	2023	2024	2025	2026			
Ranking	N/A	31	20	27	43	45	45			
