= Kings Island & Miami Valley Railroad =

Narrow gauge heritage railroad

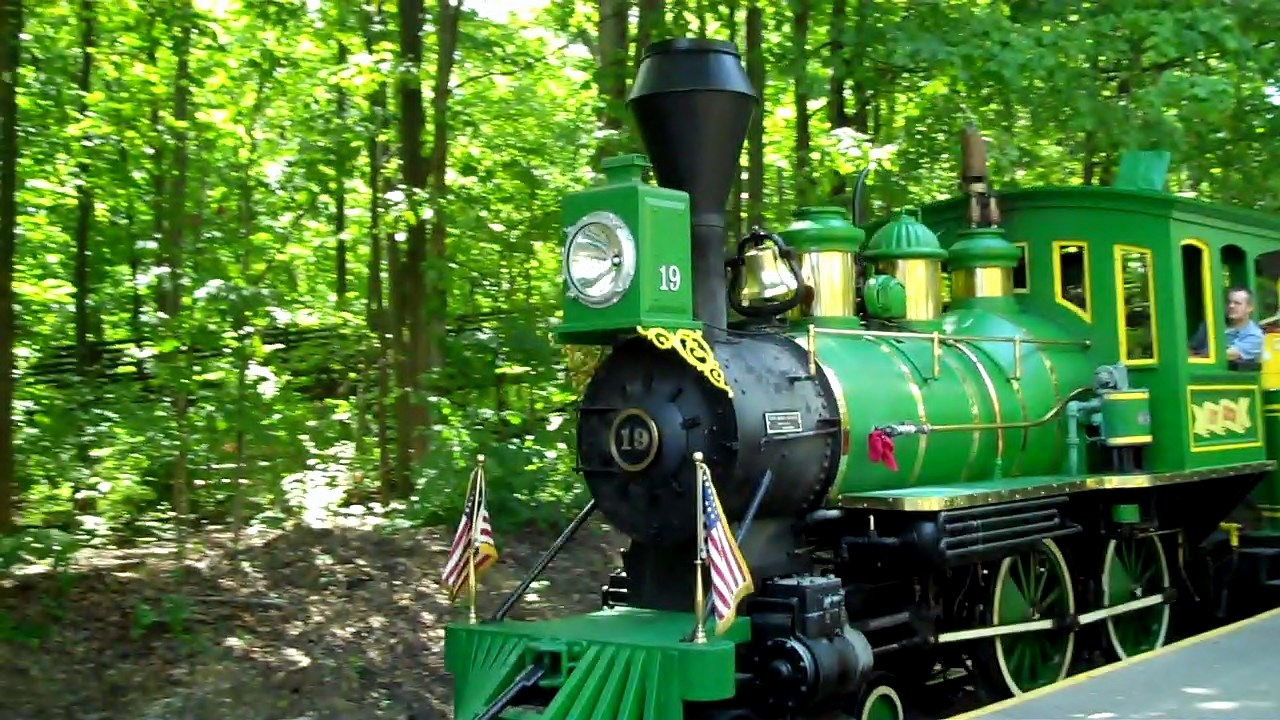
- Lew Brown #19

Kings Island
- Status: Operating
- Opening date: 1972

Ride statistics
- Length: 5,282 ft (1,610 m)
- Vehicle type: 3 ft (914 mm) propane-burning steam passenger trains
- Vehicles: 2
- Riders per vehicle: variable
- Wheelchair accessible

The Kings Island & Miami Valley Railroad is a 3 ft (914 mm) narrow gauge heritage railroad and amusement park attraction located at Kings Island in Mason, Ohio. The line is a 5,282-foot (1,610 m) loop which has two stations: the Losantiville station (the main station) also commonly referred to as "Rivertown Station" and a station at Soak City. It is a part of the rides department, and has a thrill rating of "1 - Low Thrill Ride". The entire journey lasts between 9 and 15 minutes, depending on station stops and number of trains in operation. In 2022, the railroad celebrated its 50th anniversary with the park. New changes were added to the ride's scenery (most notably a refreshed western town, as well as new animals that occupy areas within the forest). The Kings Island & Miami Valley Railroad continues to be one of the oldest and most popular attractions at Kings Island.

== Rolling stock ==
=== Locomotives ===
The Kings Island & Miami Valley Railroad maintains two working locomotives. They were built by Crown Metal Products of Pennsylvania for the park opening in 1972 and were modeled after The General.

==== No. 12 - "Kenny Van Meter" ====
The #12 engine, also known as the "Kenny Van Meter", features a propane-fired boiler and has a total weight of 25 tons (engine and tender). It is a 2/3 scale replica of The General. It is painted blue. The locomotive's original name was Tecumseh after the Shawnee leader. Originally, it featured a balloon-style stack but it was replaced in the late 1980s or early 1990s to make it stand apart from the green engine. The blue engine also originally had two blue domes but were painted red to match the wheels in the late 1980s or early 1990s, when the balloon stack was removed.

==== No. 19 - "Lew Brown" ====
The #19 engine, also known as the "Lew Brown", features a propane-fired boiler and has a total weight of 25 tons (engine and tender). Like its older brother engine, the #12, it is a scale replica of The General. The engine is painted green and was originally named Simon Kenton, after a famous Ohio frontiersman.

=== Passenger cars ===
Kings Island maintains a total of 12 open air passenger cars, arranged as 6 cars on each engine. 6 of the cars are painted green, and are typically matched with the No. 19 engine. The other 6 cars are painted red, and are matched with the No. 12 engine. Capacity per completed train (6 cars) is 465 park guests. Each passenger car has a series of seals depicting Native American Tecumseh and frontiersman Simon Kenton (after whom the engines were originally named) with the railroad name.

== Operation ==
=== Stations ===
The Kings Island & Miami Valley Railroad features two train stations. Losantiville station is considered the line's main station, and is located in the Rivertown section of the park, next to the entrance of White Water Canyon and Mystic Timbers. It is a covered station and platform. There is also a station located at the entrance to Soak City Water park, which is an uncovered concrete pad station that, unlike the Losantiville station, is a curved station.

=== Crew ===
Each train is operated by a total of four associates; an Engineer, Fireman, Front Conductor, and Back Conductor (position of back conductor may be eliminated with the operation of a scaled down train of three passenger cars, rather than the regular six). The Engineer is in charge of the operation of the locomotive, while the Fireman watches over the boiler pressure levels, and maintains the fire and water levels in the boiler. The Front Conductor is in the charge of the movement of the train, as well as the entertainment and wellbeing of the passengers aboard. Additionally, each station must be staffed by a Station Master who is responsible for the safety of passengers in the station, helping passengers load and unload, as well as keeping capacity. Two crossing guards are stationed at each of the grade crossings near Soak City, as well as the path to White Water Canyon.

=== Opening ===
Each morning, the train crew (Engineer and Fireman) prepare the engines for operation at the engine house, located near the Losantiville station. Once the first train of the morning reaches the Losantiville station, the front conductor and back conductor board the train. Once the train is staffed completely, the train must do a full test cycle around the track before passengers can be loaded. During normal weekdays (Monday-Friday), only one engine is in service. During weekends, the second train is brought into operation. Opening procedures for the bringing out the second train differ slightly, in that the front and back conductors board the train in the engine house, rather than at the Losantiville station. In order for the second train to be able to be brought out of the engine house, the first train must be parked in Losantiville station. Where the second train can then be pulled out and parked at the block light waiting until the first train leaves the station.

=== In service ===
==== Procedure for train movement ====
The Front Conductor is in charge of the movement of the train. During a normal passenger loading procedure, the station master must clear the station platform with a thumbs up signal, at which point the Back Conductor must clear the Front Conductor for movement with a hand signal known as a "Highball". Once the Front Conductor verifies the Highball from the Back Conductor and the clear from the Station Master, the Front Conductor will "Highball" the Engineer, who then proceeds with operation of the locomotive. "Highball" hand signals are also given at two locations along the train route, between the Front and Back Conductor, to signal that everything is clear on all six passenger cars.

Whistle/horn signals
▄	train arriving at station
▄ ▄	train departing station / train beginning forward movement
▄ ▄ ▄	train beginning reverse movement
▄▄▄ ▄▄▄ ▄ ▄▄▄▄	approaching grade crossing
▄▄▄▄▄▄▄▄▄▄▄	distress / emergency

==== Closing ====
After the water park closes, the park resumes one-train operation for another hour. The second train is then backed into the engine house. After the last cycle has completed for the night, the Engineer and Fireman proceed to back the other train into the engine house from the Losantiville station.

== Grade crossings ==
The Kings Island & Miami Valley Railroad has some private grade crossings for the private roads where the workers go on. The private grade crossings have one or two crossbucks. There is also a public grade crossing that has four railroad crossing signals, two gated signals with bells and lights for the public path and two gateless signals with just lights for the private road. This crossing is right next to the Soak City station. Also in 2016 another crossing was made for the entrance and exit for White Water Canyon.

== Halloween Haunt ==
The Kings Island & Miami Valley Railroad operates during the entire season. Throughout most of the season, it entertains guests and serves as transportation to and from Soak City. During the park's annual Halloween Haunt event, which occurs on weekend nights in September and October, it was transformed into a haunted maze known as "Tombstone Terror-Tory". The attraction had a western-theme and utilized the exit path of White Water Canyon. When Kings Island began construction of Mystic Timbers in 2016, the exit path was shortened significantly, and Tombstone Terror-Tory was removed from the Halloween Haunt lineup.
