= Mystic Timbers =

Wooden roller coaster at Kings Island

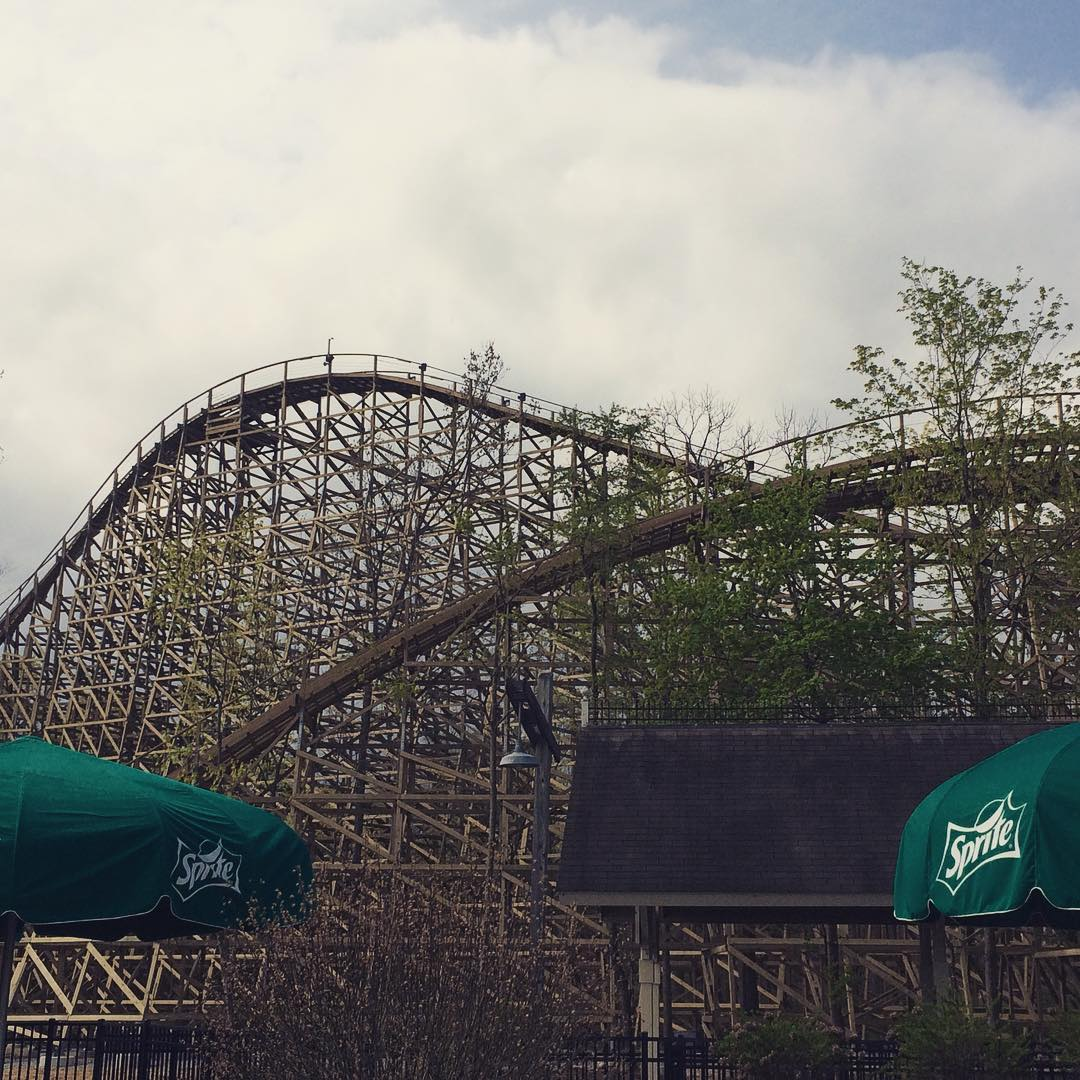
- Mystic Timbers' lift hill

Kings Island
- Location: Kings Island
- Park section: Rivertown
- Coordinates: 39.3412°N 84.2686°W
- Status: Operating
- Soft opening date: April 13, 2017
- Opening date: April 15, 2017
- Cost: $15,000,000

General statistics
- Type: Wood
- Manufacturer: Great Coasters International
- Designer: Skyline Design
- Lift/launch system: Chain lift hill
- Height: 109 ft (33 m)
- Drop: 98 ft (30 m)
- Length: 3,265 ft (995 m)
- Speed: 53 mph (85 km/h)
- Inversions: 0
- Duration: 2:00
- Capacity: 1200 riders per hour
- Height restriction: 48 in (122 cm)
- Trains: 3 trains with 12 cars; riders arranged 2 across in a single row for a total of 24 riders per train
- Website: Official website
- Fast Lane available
- Mystic Timbers at RCDB

Mystic Timbers is a wooden roller coaster located at Kings Island in Mason, Ohio. Constructed by Great Coasters International and designed by Skyline Design, the roller coaster opened in the Rivertown section of the park on April 15, 2017. The ride's fictional theme is set to the site of an abandoned logging company where unexplained events are taking place. During its marketing campaign, the finale element in an enclosed shed was not revealed to the public until opening day.

Mystic Timbers was voted "Best New Ride" of 2017 in the annual Golden Ticket Awards publication by Amusement Today. Its opening also allowed Kings Island to reclaim the title of having the most wooden roller coaster track of any amusement park in the world with 18,804 feet (5,731 m).

== History ==
Construction wall in Rivertown – May 2016

Kings Island officials began dropping hints during the 2016 operating season, which teased the possibility of a new, future attraction. In the park's Rivertown section, a construction wall was built displaying signs that stated, "Caution - Watch For Falling Trees". In June 2016, a set of plans labeled "Kings Island Project 2017" was submitted to the Mason planning board with designs for a new roller coaster. Until then, early speculation from enthusiasts believed that another possibility was a larger log flume to complement the nearby Race For Your Life Charlie Brown attraction. Later that month, media outlets in the area received a toy axe with an attached note hinting about activity in Rivertown. The following month, another clue surfaced, consisting of a blue toy pickup truck with a bundle of logs in the back. It contained a note stating that an official announcement would occur in the park on the evening of July 28, 2016.

On the night of the announcement, more than 1,000 park guests lined up two hours in advance to attend the evening event inside the park. It was revealed that the new attraction would be a roller coaster named Mystic Timbers. The new ride would mark the park's sixteenth roller coaster and fourth wooden roller coaster overall. Upon completion, Kings Island would reclaim the title of having the longest collection of wooden roller coaster track in the world at 18,804 feet (5,731 m), when combined with the other three wooden coasters in the park – The Beast, both tracks on The Racer, and Woodstock Express. This surpassed the previous record held by Six Flags Great America, which measured the combined length of Goliath, Viper, American Eagle and Little Dipper at 16,558 feet (5,047 m).

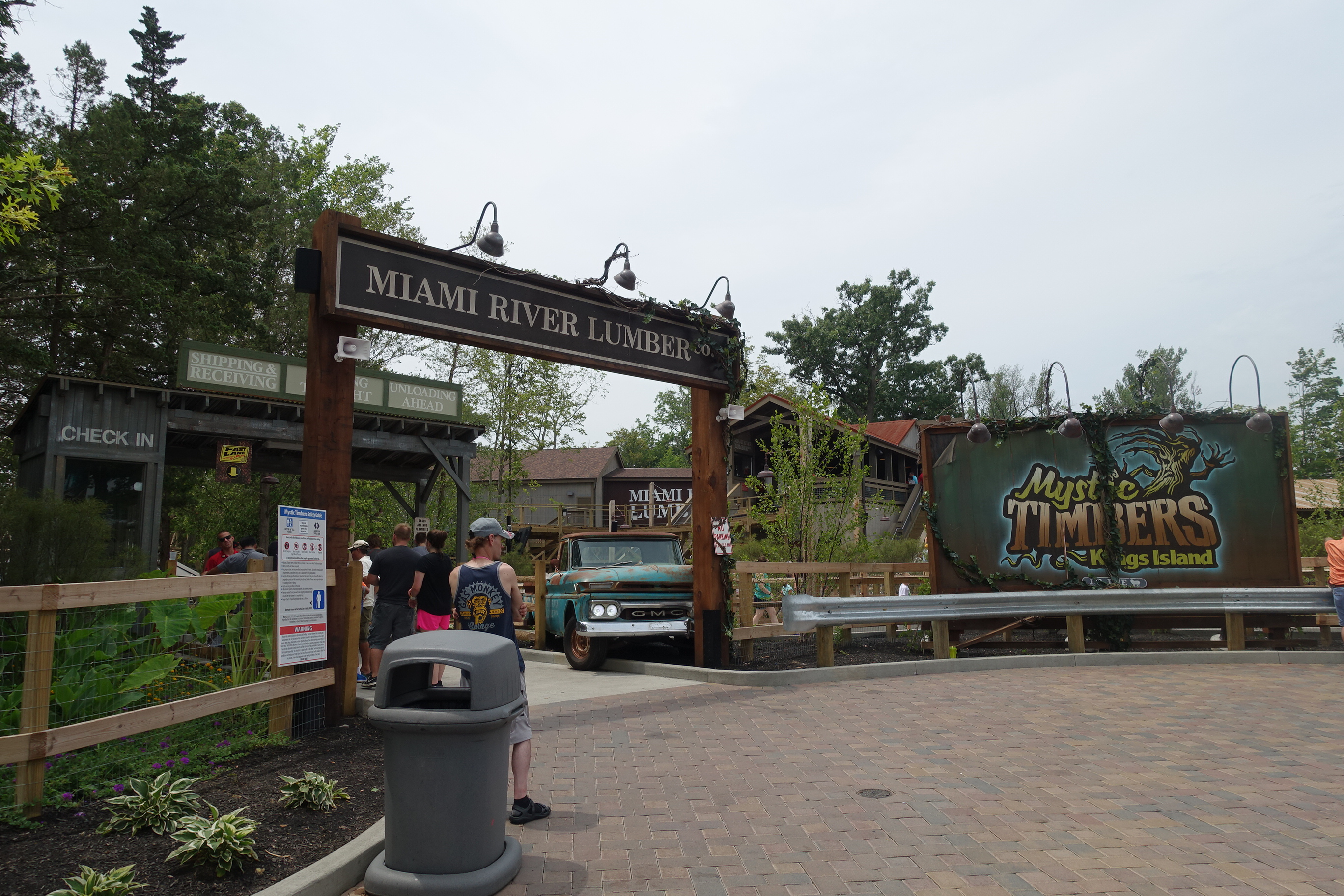
The entrance to Mystic Timbers

The ride's logo was unveiled as well, along with a simulated POV video of the ride. However, the simulation stopped short of revealing what happens when the train enters an enclosed shed near the end of the ride. Park officials indicated that the finale's details would not be revealed until opening day. The level of anticipation surrounding its debut put Mystic Timbers on USA Today's top nine list for most anticipated roller coasters of 2017.

Vertical construction of Mystic Timbers began in August 2016. On March 20, 2017, the ride performed its first test runs. The attraction opened for the press on April 13, 2017, allowing roller coaster enthusiasts and members of the media to ride early.

== Characteristics ==
Mystic Timbers is themed around a fictional logging company, Miami River Lumber, that purchased the surrounding land for its timber. The company planned to use the adjacent Kings Island & Miami Valley Railroad – the park's steam locomotive attraction – for shipping the timber out. However, an unexplained series of events led to the shutdown of the company, as the land was taken over by rampant natural growth.

The attraction was designed and built by Great Coasters International, a Pennsylvania-based company that specializes in the construction and restoration of wooden roller coasters. The 109-foot-tall (33 m) Mystic Timbers is 3,265 feet (995 m) in length and reaches a maximum speed of 53 miles per hour (85 km/h). It features a 98-foot-long (30 m) drop and sixteen airtime hills. Its three trains each carry 24 passengers, resulting in a total capacity of approximately 1200 riders per hour. The roller coaster's track layout utilizes the terrain and interacts with both the Kings Island & Miami Valley Railroad and White Water Canyon attractions during its roughly two-minute ride cycle.

== Ride experience ==
=== Queue ===
The queue begins with a sign at the main entrance displaying "Miami River Lumber Co.", along with a checkpoint themed for shipping and receiving lumber. It features a vintage GMC Truck that appears to have crashed into one of the sign's pillars. Music from the truck and a man speaking about the backstory of the ride is played. A message also plays occasionally that states, "Warning, do not enter. A mandatory and ongoing lockdown has been ordered for the Miami River Lumber Company. Repeat, do not enter."

Throughout the entire queue, many rails are made of wood in accordance with the ride's theme. At the beginning of the queue, the path is very windy and features television screens showing security cameras of the woods, with security teams performing a search. One clip shows a frightened security guard running off screen after seeing something in the woods. The queue winds toward the back of the station, returning to the front if all rows are in use during long wait times. It eventually leads to a staircase that takes riders up into the station. Multiple props resembling a lumber workspace are on display inside the station. Spooky instrumental music plays throughout the queue and station.

=== Layout ===
The ride begins with the train leaving the station, upon which it makes an S-turn to the right, crossing over the railroad, then to the left, before climbing the lift hill. Upon latching on to the lift hill chain, a pre-recorded voice chastises the riders saying, "Hey! Hey! I see you up there! What on Earth do you think you're doing? This is security. Seriously, guys, you need to take that truck, go home to your video games. This place is not safe." Cresting the 109 foot lift hill, the chain slows again so that another pre-recorded voice can tell the riders over loudspeakers, "Whatever you do, don't go in the shed!" At the top, the train makes a swooping 98 foot drop to the left, before rising over another hill. At the crest of this second hill, the train makes another left turn and crosses over the lift hill, before diving close to the ground and traveling over a series of airtime hills. The track briefly enters a covered tunnel as it makes a left-hand turn to change directions and return towards the station. The return track runs mostly parallel to the outbound track until near the second drop, where it veers away to hit a brake run, coming to a stop outside the entrance to the shed.

=== The Shed ===
Upon stopping on the brake run, a pre-recorded audio segment is heard. A security guard is heard saying, "Don't go in the shed. This is a restricted area." The audio loops several times and begins to glitch and skip, eventually changing to, "Go in the shed." The train proceeds slowly into the shed, which is only dimly-illuminated by flickering overhead lamps and fluorescent lights. After passing through the storage tracks, the train comes to a stop approximately where the shed crosses over the railroad once again. In this room, an assortment of saws, vines, leaves, a Coca-Cola vending machine, and other items left behind by workers are visible. A cassette player starts playing one of four songs from the 1980s (Maneater by Hall & Oates, Total Eclipse of the Heart by Bonnie Tyler, Cars by Gary Numan, or Can't Take My Eyes Off You by Boys Town Gang) until a loud screeching sound is heard. Projection screens show one of three random creatures, followed by a 90° turn to the right as the train re-enters the station.

- Bats: A large group of bats swoop at the train followed by a giant one that swarms the middle of the screen.
- Snake: A huge snake appears on the screen and appears to take a biting lunge at riders.
- Tree: First, a swarm of insects can be seen crawling on some tree branches. Next, a giant tree comes alive giving the illusion of grabbing the train as it passes by.

Other characteristics Sources:
Detail	Measurement
First drop overall length, referred to as the profile length	98 feet (30 m)
Angle of the first drop	53.7°
Volume of southern yellow pine lumber used to construct the ride	330,000 board feet
Weight of nails used in construction	30,000 pounds (14,000 kg)
Number of bolts and washers used	88,000
Volume of concrete	5,500 cubic yards (4,200 m^{3})

== Awards ==
In 2017, Mystic Timbers was awarded "Best New Ride" by Amusement Today in their annual Golden Ticket Awards publication. Overall, it was ranked eleventh among all wooden roller coasters.

Golden Ticket Awards: Top wood Roller Coasters
Year									1998	1999
Ranking									–	–
Year	2000	2001	2002	2003	2004	2005	2006	2007	2008	2009
Ranking	–	–	–	–	–	–	–	–	–	–
Year	2010	2011	2012	2013	2014	2015	2016	2017	2018	2019
Ranking	–	–	–	–	–	–	–	11	11	10
Year	2020	2021	2022	2023	2024	2025	2026			
Ranking	N/A	6	6	7	5	6	5			
