= Kings Island =

Amusement park in Mason, Ohio, US

- Previously known as Paramount's Kings Island (1993–2006)

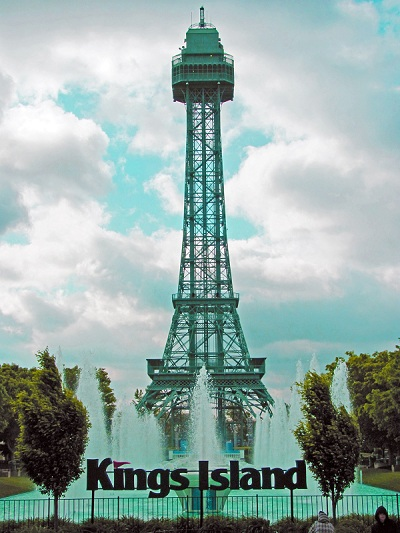
- Kings Island's original fountains with Eiffel Tower
- Interactive map of Kings Island
- Location: Mason, Ohio, U.S.
- Coordinates: 39°20′41.23″N 84°16′06.99″W
- Status: Operating
- Opened: April 29, 1972
- Owner: Six Flags
- Park president: Tony Carovillano
- Slogan: "It's Amazing In Here" and "Come On Get Happy"
- Operating season: April through December
- Attendance: 3.465 million in 2024
- Area: 364 acres (147 ha)

Attractions
- Total: 49
- Roller coasters: 15
- Water rides: 3
- Website: sixflags.com/kingsisland

Kings Island is a 364-acre (147 ha) amusement park located 24 miles (39 km) northeast of Cincinnati in Mason, Ohio, United States. Owned and operated by Six Flags, the park was built by Taft Broadcasting and opened in 1972. It was part of a larger effort to move and expand Coney Island, a popular resort destination along the banks of the Ohio River that was prone to frequent flooding. After more than $300 million in capital investments over the years, the park has grown to feature over a hundred attractions including fifteen roller coasters and a 33-acre (13 ha) water park called Soak City.

Early in its history, Kings Island appeared in popular sitcoms and received widespread recognition for its record-breaking attractions and events. One of the park's most well-known attractions, The Racer, is often credited with reviving worldwide interest in roller coasters during the 1970s. A variety of attractions over the years introduced notable milestones, and The Beast and Banshee are two that have set enduring world records. The largest single investment in park history is Orion, a $30-million giga coaster that opened in 2020. The park has also experienced a number of setbacks generating negative publicity, including the early demise of The Bat and Son of Beast roller coasters.

Kings Island is divided into nine themed sections and operates seasonally from early spring through Labor Day in the fall, followed by two additional holiday-themed events known as Halloween Haunt and Winterfest. Kings Island had an estimated 3.18 million guests in 2021, ranking third in attendance among seasonal amusement parks in North America behind sister parks Canada's Wonderland and Cedar Point. In addition, Kings Island has won Golden Ticket Awards in the annual publication from Amusement Today, including "Best Kids' Area" in the world for eighteen consecutive years (2001–2018) and "Best New Ride" in 2017 for Mystic Timbers. In the same publication, The Beast consistently ranks each year as one of the top ten wooden coasters in the world.

== History ==
Kings Island was conceived as early as 1964 when Coney Island, a popular amusement park 10 miles (16 km) east of downtown Cincinnati on the banks of the Ohio River, suffered from a major flood that submerged the area in over 14 feet (4.3 m) of water. Although occasional flooding was common at the successful park, the flood in 1964 was the fourth highest on record and caused considerable damage. Faced with already-limited space for expansion and parking, the event triggered discussions within the organization about relocating the park.

Leading the way was Gary Wachs, son of Coney Island president Ralph Wachs, who with friends and family owned a majority of stock. He decided it was time to relocate the park to stay competitive. After years of research and traveling abroad, he presented ideas for a new theme park to the company's board of directors. Some board members opposed relocating, including significant stockholder Charles Sawyer. It was not taken seriously until 1968 when actor Fess Parker announced plans to build a theme park in Northern Kentucky – well within Coney Island's primary market that extended as far south as Louisville. The announcement highlighted the need for change and gave Wachs' proposal credibility within the organization.

Gary and Ralph met with Dudley S. Taft, president of Taft Broadcasting Company, to discuss a possible merger. Taft Broadcasting was interested in promoting its recently acquired Hanna-Barbera division, and in July 1969, the company purchased Coney Island for $6.5 million and 1,600 acres (650 ha) in Warren County, Ohio, for $3.2 million. Kings Island still owned 773 acres (313 ha) of that purchase as of 2005. The site is located between I-71 and the Little Miami River in what was then a part of Deerfield Township. Following the purchase, Fess Parker's efforts to secure financing fell apart along with his plans to build a competing theme park.

=== Taft Broadcasting and KECO (1970–1992) ===
Construction began on June 15, 1970. Later that year, a public contest was held to name the new park. "Kings Island" emerged the most popular, as the name was a nod to both the local Kings Mills area as well as the park's predecessor Coney Island. Most of the rides at Coney Island were relocated, and much of what remained was demolished. The popular Sunlite Pool attraction continued to operate, however, and the park was partially restored years later.

Less than two years after breaking ground, Kings Island opened its gates to the public on April 29, 1972. It was the first of several preview events. The grand opening was held the following month on May 27, 1972.

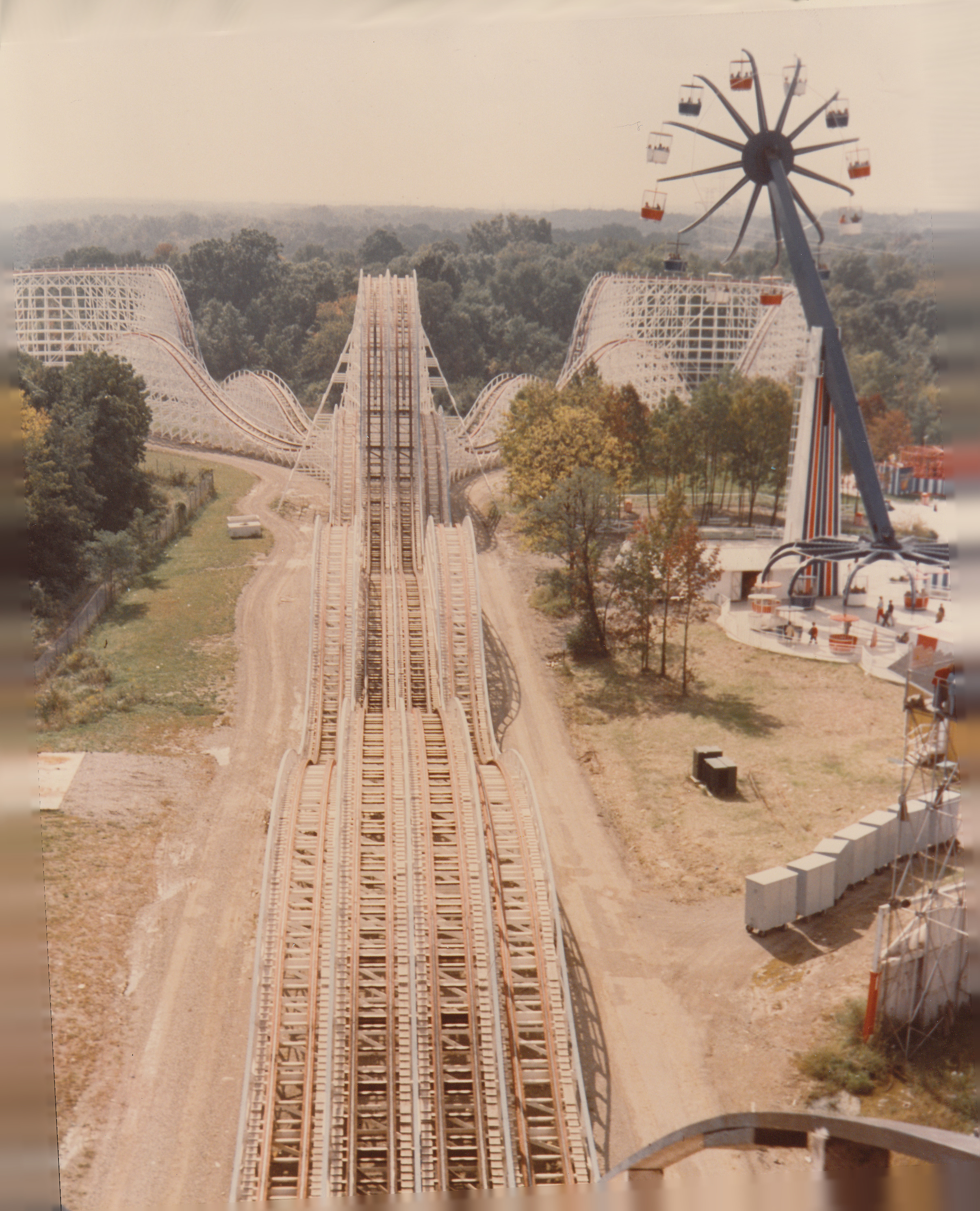
View from The Racer in the mid-1970s with Zodiac on the right

One of the first signature attractions featured at the park was The Racer, a wooden roller coaster consisting of two trains that race side by side on identical tracks. Designed by legendary designer John C. Allen, who was convinced to come out of retirement, The Racer was the first of its kind in 35 years and played an integral part of the roller coaster renaissance of the 1970s. Decades later, it was distinguished as a Roller Coaster Landmark by American Coaster Enthusiasts (ACE) in recognition for its historical significance. Other roller coasters present on opening day in 1972 were the Bavarian Beetle, a small steel coaster brought over from Coney Island, and a new junior wooden coaster in the Happy Land of Hanna-Barbera originally named Scooby Doo. The most expensive ride to open with the park was Enchanted Voyage, a $2-million dark ride attraction that featured over a hundred animatronic Hanna-Barbera characters.

Kings Island was nationally promoted in two well-known sitcoms: The Partridge Family in 1972 and The Brady Bunch in 1973. Each filmed an episode on location at the park, which were later broadcast on ABC. The Brady Bunch was produced by Paramount Television, a large Taft Broadcasting shareholder. The park also held several world-record-breaking events. In 1974, 69-year-old Karl Wallenda set a world record for the longest tightrope skywalk at a distance of 1,800 feet (550 m), which was performed 60 feet (18 m) off the ground. The following year, Evel Knievel successfully jumped fourteen Greyhound buses on his Harley Davidson at Kings Island, clearing a distance of 133 feet (41 m). The jump set a world record that held until 1999. It was the longest successful jump of his career as well as his last major stunt, and the nationally televised event was broadcast live on ABC, landing 52 percent of the TV audience during that hour with an estimated 55 million viewers. Park executives favored the national exposure and additional revenue being generated by record-breaking, newsworthy events that kept the park at the forefront of the industry. To keep momentum going, Kings Island spent years researching and designing a mammoth roller coaster, The Beast, which opened in 1979 as the tallest, fastest, and longest wooden roller coaster in the world. It was designed and manufactured internally by the park.

On the heels of early success came turbulent times beginning in the 1980s. Kings Island partnered with Arrow Development, an amusement ride company well known for its work at Disneyland and Disney World, to develop a unique roller coaster concept. The Bat opened to the public in 1981 as the first modern-day, suspended roller coaster featuring an overhead track with train cars that swung freely from side to side, designed to simulate the feeling of flight. Although it was well received, it was plagued with design flaws and constant maintenance that resulted in frequent closures over its short, three-year history. To appease frustrated guests, the south track of The Racer began running its trains backward in 1982, which became so popular that the change remained until 2008. The park also pushed forward with its next major addition, King Cobra, which opened in 1984 as the first of its kind to be designed from inception as a stand-up roller coaster.

Kings Island also went through a series of ownership changes over the next decade. Taft sold its theme park division in 1984 for $167.5 million to Kings Entertainment Company (KECO), a company formed by senior executives and general managers of Taft Attractions Group. Three parks – Kings Island, Kings Dominion and Carowinds – were involved in the sale. Taft invested in KECO to retain one-third interest. Three years later in 1987, Kings Island was sold individually to American Financial Corporation, led by Carl Lindner. The deal included a contract with KECO to continue managing park operations. KECO, which retained ownership of the other two parks, also added Great America to its portfolio after purchasing it in 1989 from the city of Santa Clara, California.

=== Paramount's Kings Island (1992–2006) ===
In 1992 Paramount Communications Inc. (formerly Gulf+Western) purchased KECO along with Kings Island from American Financial in a deal worth $400 million. Paramount formed a new division known as Paramount Parks. KECO owned 20% of Canada's Wonderland, and Paramount bought out the remaining 80% stake in 1993, raising the total number of parks to five. Later that year, Paramount Parks began incorporating themes from its movies into each park. Viacom entered the picture after acquiring Paramount in 1994, paving the way for the inclusion of Nickelodeon themes. Nickelodeon Splat City, an interactive splash pad area, was added in 1995, which later evolved into Nickelodeon Central (2001) and eventually Nickelodeon Universe (2006).

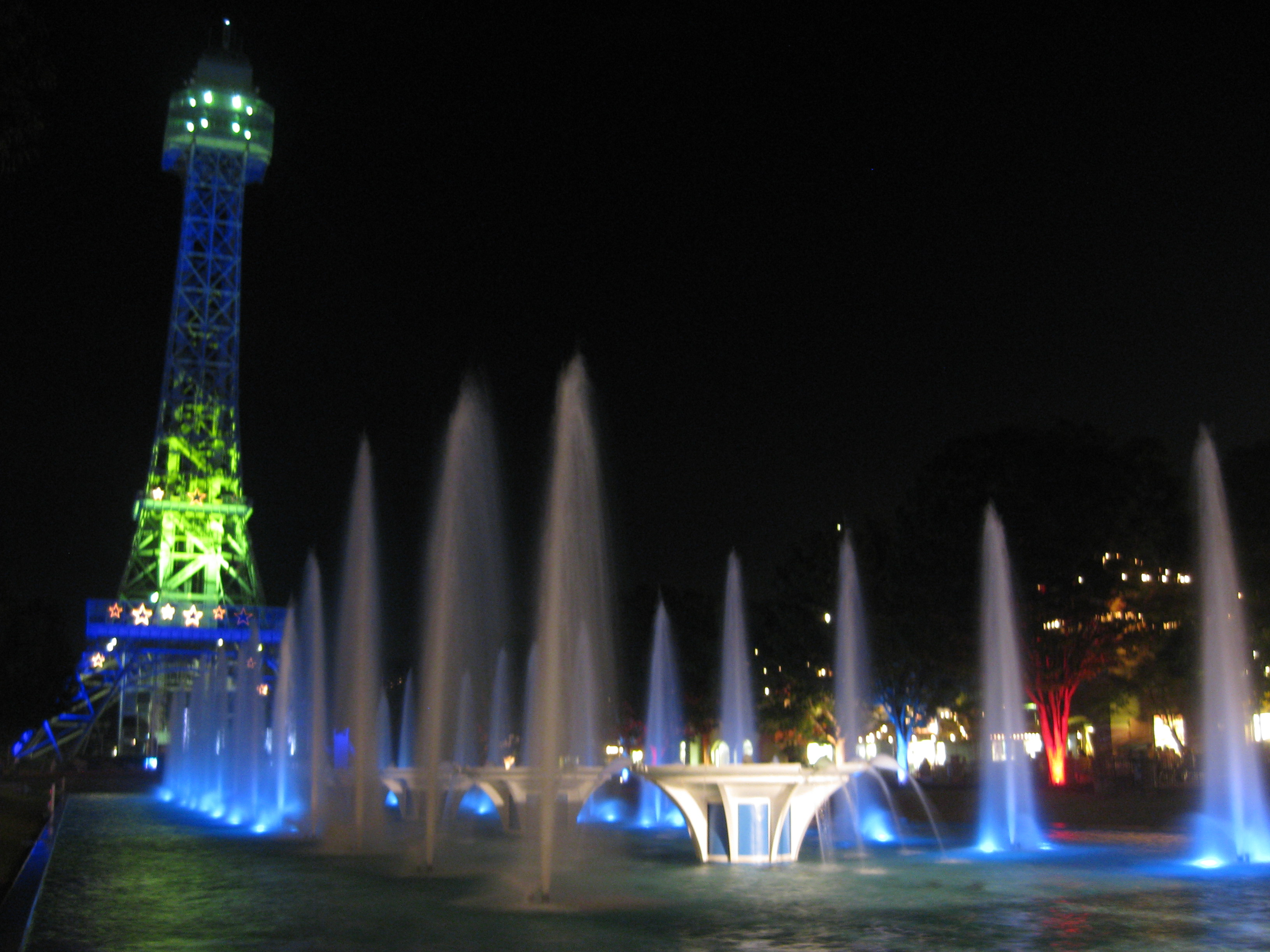
The Eiffel Tower and the fountains at night

In 1997, a year after leaving Deerfield Township, the city of Mason annexed most of Kings Island. A temporary measure allowed for some land to remain in Deerfield in an attempt to appease park officials and reduce the impact on the township. The rest would be annexed in 1999. In 2005, Viacom split into two companies, Viacom and CBS Corporation, with CBS inheriting Paramount Parks. CBS made the decision to sell its theme park division in January 2006. CBS CEO Leslie Moonves stated that despite the health and profitability of Paramount Parks, the business was "one that just doesn't fit our core strategy".

=== Cedar Fair era (2006–2024) ===
After receiving interest from several potential suitors, CBS announced the sale of Paramount Parks to Cedar Fair on June 30, 2006, for $1.24 billion. The acquisition of Kings Island gave Cedar Fair, who had recently acquired Geauga Lake from Six Flags in 2004, ownership of all three major amusement parks in Ohio. Part of the agreement allowed Kings Island to continue using Nickelodeon themes and characters for four years and other Paramount-related branding for ten years, with the option to extend the license on both.

Cedar Fair opted for a buyout option within an agreement clause to remove Paramount branding after one season. Beginning in 2008, Face/Off became Invertigo, The Italian Job Stunt Track became Backlot Stunt Coaster. Tomb Raider: The Ride became The Crypt and Top Gun became Flight Deck. Nickelodeon's presence remained until the 2010 season, when Cedar Fair began incorporating its Peanuts theme throughout the park, primarily in the children's area. Nickelodeon Universe was renamed Planet Snoopy to complete the transition.

In late 2009 the Mason City Council added a measure on its 2010 ballot that would mandate a 3-percent ticket tax and a 5-percent parking tax at both Kings Island and The Beach Waterpark. Council member Tony Bradburn argued that it was necessary for the city to help pay for infrastructure improvements, as well as cover police and fire expenses. The proposed tax hike was the center of debate for several months, as Kings Island actively encouraged the public to write, email, and call Mason City Council representatives to express opposition. On February 8, 2010, Mason City Council voted 5–1 against the measure.

A new themed area called Adventure Port was added in 2023, replacing part of Oktoberfest and adding two new family rides – Sol Spin and Cargo Loco. In the 2024 season, Kings Island expanded Planet Snoopy with the addition of a new themed section called Camp Snoopy.

=== Six Flags era (2024–present) ===
On July 1, 2024, a merger of equals between Cedar Fair and Six Flags was completed. This merger created Six Flags Entertainment Corporation which encompasses all legacy Six flags and legacy Cedar Fair parks, including Kings Island. In 2025, Backlot Stunt Coaster was renamed Queen City Stunt Coaster for the ride's 20th anniversary, referencing the nickname for Cincinnati and featuring some minor theming updates.

== Areas and attractions ==
Kings Island has invested more than $300 million in improvements since its grand opening in 1972, including the addition of new rides and attractions. The park originally opened with sixty attractions which grew to more than a hundred by 2017. The number of themed areas has also expanded from the original five – Coney Island (now Coney Mall), Happy Land of Hanna-Barbera (now Planet Snoopy), International Street, Oktoberfest, and Rivertown – to nine by 2024, including the latest additions of Area 72, Adventure Port and Camp Snoopy. A water park was added in 1989, and the number of employees required for park operations has grown from 1,300 to approximately 4,000.

=== Action Zone ===
Action Zone opened in 1974 as Lion Country Safari, a 100-acre (40 ha) section of the park featuring a monorail ride that took guests on a safari-style tour through an animal preservation. This was part of a network of other safari-style zoos also called Lion Country Safari. It was later renamed Wild Animal Safari in 1977. In 1983, the area became known as Wild Animal Habitat and included Adventure Village, a new area within the rebranded section. Over the years, it featured rides such as Screamin' Demon (1977–1987), the first steel looping roller coaster to run both forward and backward in the United States, and King Cobra (1984–2001), a stand-up looping roller coaster that was the first of its kind in the world.

Early in its tenure after purchasing Kings Island, Paramount unveiled Top Gun, a suspended roller coaster from Arrow Dynamics, in 1993. Located next to the habitat attraction, it was titled after a film of the same name and was the first ride to be added to the park with a Paramount theme. The following year, the entire area was renamed Adventure Village coinciding with the removal of the animal habitat and monorail ride. In 1999, a two-year expansion initiative began with the area's renaming to Action Zone and the addition of two new attractions – Drop Zone: Stunt Tower and Face/Off. When it debuted, Action Zone resembled a movie stunt set featuring a water tower as the centerpiece. The water tower was originally part of a skit with stunts and special effects that imitated a live movie set with a director and stunt performers.

Son of Beast opened in 2000, the second year of the area's two-year expansion. It was the tallest and fastest wooden roller coaster in the world and the first of its kind to feature a vertical loop. As a result of a number of structural issues and two accidents, the ride closed permanently in 2009 and was eventually demolished in 2012. Other notable rides include Delirium, which opened in 2003 as the largest Giant Frisbee ride in the world, and Banshee, the world's longest inverted roller coaster which opened in 2014 at the former location of Son of Beast.

Name	Opened	Manufacturer	Model	Description	Thrill rating (Note: Ratings assigned per Kings Island's own system, where "1" is the least intense and "5" is the most. See the park's guest assistance guide for more information.)
Banshee	2014	Bolliger & Mabillard	Inverted Coaster	An inverted roller coaster that is the longest of its kind in the world. Features seven inversions and is located in the former location of Thunder Alley and Son of Beast.	5
Congo Falls	1988	Intamin	Shoot-the-Chute	A Shoot-the-Chute water ride with a 34' drop that originally opened as Amazon Falls (1988–1998) and was later renamed Congo Falls after the Paramount film Congo.	4
Delirium	2003	HUSS	Giant Frisbee	A Giant Frisbee ride that swings riders at an angle of 120° up to 137 feet (42 m) into the air at a maximum speed of 76 mph (122 km/h).	5
Drop Tower	1999	Intamin	Gyro Drop	A 315-foot (96 m) drop tower ride that is the tallest of its kind in the world. Formerly known as Drop Tower: Scream Zone and Drop Zone: Stunt Tower (1999–2007).	4
Invertigo	1999	Vekoma	Invertigo	An inverted Boomerang roller coaster. Formerly known as Face/Off (1999–2007).	5
The Bat	1993	Arrow Dynamics	Suspended	A suspended roller coaster in which free-swinging cars are suspended below the track. Formerly known as Top Gun (1993–2007) and Flight Deck (2008–2013)	4
Timberwolf Amphitheatre	1982	—N/a	—N/a	Concert venue built to replace Stadium of Stars.	—N/a

=== Adventure Port ===
In 2023, Kings Island opened a newly themed area called Adventure Port, which introduced family rides Sol Spin and Cargo Loco. The area was previously a part of the Oktoberfest section and includes a steel coaster called Adventure Express, which opened in 1991. Adventure Express received some theming enhancements during the transition.

Name	Opened	Manufacturer	Model	Description	Thrill rating
Adventure Express	1991	Arrow Dynamics	Mine train	A mine train roller coaster with a wooden frame and supports.	5
Cargo Loco	2023	Zamperla	Spinning Tea Cup	A spinning teacups flat ride that features barrels in place of teacups. Replaced SlingShot.	3
Sol Spin	2023	Zamperla	Endeavour	A spinning ride with open-air, suspended passenger vehicles that tilt vertically and propel riders to a height of 60 feet (18 m) at a maximum speed of 25 mph (40 km/h).	4

=== Area 72 ===
Area 72, formerly known as X-Base, is an area themed as a secret aerospace research facility that features two roller coasters. The area first opened as a small subsection of Coney Mall when Flight of Fear was introduced in 1996. It expanded in 2007 following the addition of Firehawk and was labeled X-Base, a name only designated by a small sign in Coney Mall.

Firehawk closed in 2018 and was removed prior to the 2019 season. The park began leaking clues that implied a new ride would take its place, and in August 2019, the park unveiled plans to build Orion, the park's first giga coaster, with park guests and press in attendance. The area, which received an updated theme and was added to the official park map for the first time, was renamed Area 72 for the 2020 season.

Name	Opened	Manufacturer	Model	Description	Thrill rating
Flight of Fear	1996	Premier Rides	LIM Catapult Coaster	An indoor launched roller coaster formerly known as Outer Limits: Flight of Fear (1996–2000). An identical installation opened at Kings Dominion on the same day.	5
Orion	2020	Bolliger & Mabillard	Hyper Coaster	A Hyper Coaster model from B&M that features a 300-foot drop (91 m), 5,321 feet (1,622 m) of track, and a maximum speed of 91 mph (146 km/h) At the time of opening, it was the largest investment in park history and became the seventh giga coaster in the world.	5

=== Coney Mall ===
When Kings Island first opened in 1972, a section of the park was dedicated to its predecessor, Coney Island. The area was constructed to resemble the former park's carnival-style layout and featured many of its flat rides which were relocated, including Monster, Scrambler, and Dodgem. One of the new flagship attractions during the park's inaugural year, The Racer, is located in this section. In addition to rides, some of Coney Island's famous Ginkgo trees were transplanted, lining the middle of the walkway. Originally called Coney Island, the area was renamed Old Coney in 1980 and Coney Mall in 1986. The area also features game booths, arcades, and concession stands in the style of state fairs and traveling carnivals from the early twentieth century.

Zodiac, described as a "spinning, climbing double ferris wheel", debuted in 1975 as one of only two of its kind in the United States. Brokered by Intamin and manufactured by Waagner-Biro, the three-minute ride featured twelve gondolas on each of the two wheels, which were mounted to a long, hydraulic arm. It was removed following the 1986 season and relocated to Wonderland Sydney, where it reopened in 1989. In the 1980s, flat rides Skylab (1986–1997) and Zephyr were added, along with a looping roller coaster named Vortex (1987–2019), which was the first in the world to feature six inversions.

Following Paramount's acquisition of the park in 1992, Coney Mall was further expanded in 1994 with the addition of Days of Thunder, a NASCAR-themed motion simulator ride based on the 1990 film of the same name. The ride was housed within Action Theater located near The Racer's turnaround, and it was later updated with different shows based on James Bond, SpongeBob, and other themes before its closure in 2013. A 301-foot-tall (92 m), three-minute swing ride called WindSeeker was added in 2011, which features two-person swing carriages that rotate around a central tower at a maximum speed of 30 mph (48 km/h). For the 2019 season, an antique car ride called Kings Mills Antique Autos, designed to resemble the retired Les Taxis (1972–2004), returned to Coney Mall as a new attraction.

Name	Opened	Manufacturer	Model	Description	Thrill rating
Dodgem	1986	Preston & Barbieri	Majestic Manufacturing (Azzurra)	Italian-made bumper cars that seat two people with fully functional headlights, taillights, rear-view mirrors and hazard flashers. Single car bumper cars with a rectangular floor area previously operated at Coney Island from 1924 to 1971, and were relocated to Kings Island, but the smaller ride was removed after the 1985 season and replaced with this larger, different shaped version for the 1986 season.	4
Kings Mills Antique Autos	2019	Gould Manufacturing	Antique car ride	An antique car attraction reminiscent of the former Les Taxis ride. Includes a covered bridge, a pond, a faux gas station, and several billboards that reference past Kings Island attractions.	2
Monster	1972	Eyerly Aircraft Co.	Eyerly Monster	Traditional Octopus ride that spins in three different circles at the same time. It quickly raises and lowers riders as the cars spin. Originally operated at Coney Island (1968–1971).	3
Queen City Stunt Coaster	2005	Premier Rides	LIM Launch Track	A launched roller coaster originally based on a chase sequence in the 2003 film The Italian Job. Riders launch into a parking garage, dodge police cars, and ride past a helicopter. A second launch section sends riders into a winding dark tunnel. Formerly known as The Italian Job: Stunt Track (2005–2007) and Backlot Stunt Coaster (2008–2024).	5
Scrambler	1972	Eli Bridge Company	Scrambler – Traditional Deluxe	Traditional amusement park Twist ride. 3 arms spin riders giving them the sensation of almost hitting the wall. Originally operated at Coney Island (1969–1971).	3
Shake, Rattle & Roll	1975	HUSS	Troika	A classic spinning ride. Formerly known as Troika.	3
The Racer	1972	Philadelphia Toboggan Coasters	Wooden racing roller coaster.	A twin tracked wooden roller coaster designed by the late John Allen. The trains on the south track were changed to ride backward in 1982, but the original orientation was restored in 2008.	4
WindSeeker	2011	Mondial	Wind Seeker	A flat ride featuring 32, two-person swings that slowly rotate and ascends the 301-foot (92 m) tower until reaching the top where speeds increase up to 30 mph (48 km/h). After several delays, it opened June 21.	4
Zephyr	1986	Zierer	Wave Swinger	A suspended swing ride that rotates with a wave motion lifting riders up to 30 feet (9.1 m) in the air.	3

=== International Street ===
At the heart of the amusement park, visitors are greeted by International Street, which lies just beyond the main entrance. As one of the park's original staples when it opened in 1972, International Street was designed by Bruce Bushman, a former Walt Disney Imagineering layout design artist. The area's architecture and cultural themes represent Italy, Spain, Germany, and Switzerland. To save on the cost of construction, the unused second story of each building was designed on a three-quarters scale, borrowing from a practice used by Disney throughout its theme parks.

Enchanted Voyage, an Old Mill dark ride that ferried guests in unaccompanied boats along water-filled guideways, was also a primary attraction that opened with the park. Shaped like a large TV set, the building housed separately-themed areas that made heavy use of animatronic Hanna-Barbera characters. The ride was overhauled for the 1984 season when it became Smurf's Enchanted Voyage. In 1992, the building was transformed once more into Phantom Theater, replacing the ride's waterways with an Omnimover-style system of transport. It was themed as a behind-the-scenes tour of a haunted theater. The theme and ride vehicles were changed over the years – Scooby Doo and the Haunted Castle in 2003 and Boo Blasters on Boo Hill in 2010 – but the same underlying transportation system was retained each time. In 2026, Kings Island will open Phantom Theater: Opening Nightmare, a revival of the original Phantom Theater attraction with modern technology and interactive elements not found in the original ride.

The area's main attractions include the Royal Fountain, a 600,000-US-gallon pool (2,300 m^{3}) capable of shooting 10,000 US gallons (38 m^{3}) of water into the air each minute, and the signature Eiffel Tower, a one-third scale replica of the original which offers a view of the entire park to its guests. Grand Carousel, a classic carousel built in 1926 and originally located at Coney Island, is another International Street attraction. Also located here is Kings Island Theater along with a variety of restaurants and souvenir shops.

Name	Opened	Manufacturer	Model	Description	Thrill rating
Phantom Theater: Opening Nightmare	2026	Morgan Manufacturing, Sally Corporation	Dark Ride	A dark ride with a haunted attraction theme that uses an Omnimover-style transport system, which has been used in past iterations of the ride: Phantom Theater (1992–2002), Scooby-Doo and the Haunted Castle (2003–2009) and Boo Blasters on Boo Hill (2010–2025). The building originally housed an indoor boat ride, Enchanted Voyage (1972–1983) and Smurf's Enchanted Voyage (1984–1991), manufactured by Arrow Development.	2
Eiffel Tower	1972	Intamin	Paris Tower	An approximately one-third scale replica of the Eiffel Tower in Paris at 314 feet (96 m) and 450 tons. The tower was initially 331.5 feet (101.0 m), but the structure's top antenna was eventually removed. Kings Dominion has a near-exact replica.	2
Grand Carousel	1972	Philadelphia Toboggan Company	Carousel, PTC No. 79	The classic Carousel was built in 1926 and is painted with more than 20,000 sheets of 23-karat (96%) gold, 1,000 sheets of sterling silver and 48 hand-carved wooden horses. It features the Wurlitzer No. 157 band organ. Operated at Coney Island (1926–1971).	1
International Showplace	1977	—N/a	—N/a	Entertainment venue	—N/a
International Street Bandstand	1972	—N/a	—N/a	Entertainment venue formerly known as Royal Fountain Bandstand	—N/a
Kings Island Theater	1976	—N/a	—N/a	Entertainment venue formerly known as American Heritage Music Hall and Paramount Theater	—N/a
Tower Gardens	1978			A quiet garden space located to the left of the Eiffel Tower. Replaced the original Kings Island Theater. In 2022 the park added the Tower Gardens History Walk, a series of engraved stones detailing the history of Kings Island since its opening in 1972. Formerly known as The Paramount Story where it was used to promote the history of Paramount movies and showcased various props and characters.	

=== Oktoberfest ===
Oktoberfest, relating to the eponymous German festival, opened with the park in 1972 and celebrates Cincinnati's German history. The area resembles a German town with timber-framed, German-style architecture. The Festhaus building is its central attraction, featuring live shows with several indoor eateries. Rides within Oktoberfest include a swinging pirate ship ride called Viking Fury, which opened in 1982. Part of Oktoberfest was renovated and split off to become Adventure Port in 2023.

Name	Opened	Manufacturer	Model	Description	Thrill rating
Festhaus	1982	—N/a	—N/a	An Entertainment venue and food court. This building was originally built for Winterfest prior to becoming year-round.	—N/a
Viking Fury	1982	Intamin	Super Bounty	Swinging pirate ship ride.	3

=== Planet Snoopy ===
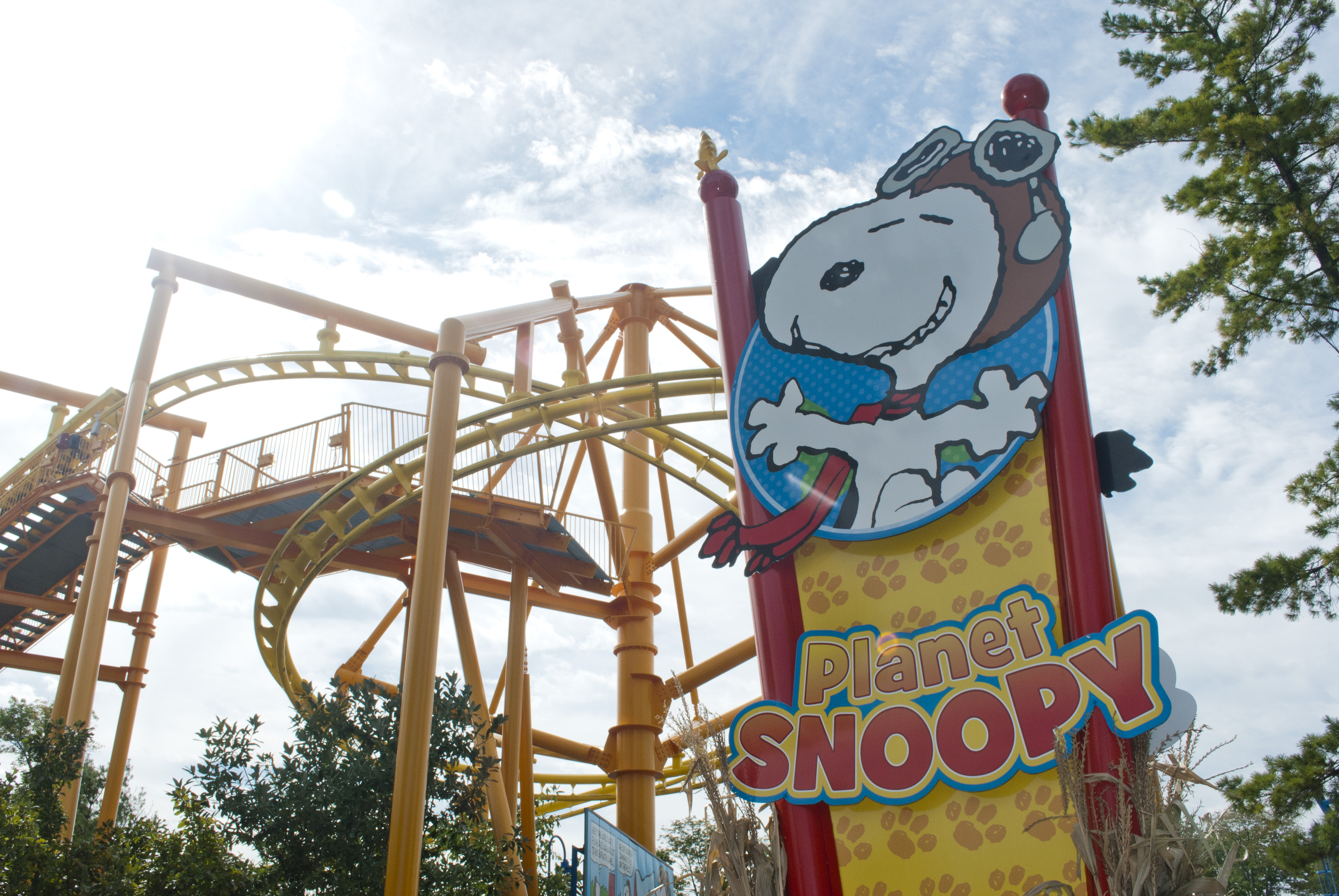
Former Entrance to Planet Snoopy

The area initially opened with the park in 1972 as The Happy Land of Hanna-Barbera and was later shortened to Hanna-Barbera Land. One of the area's flagship attractions was a junior wooden roller coaster named Scooby-Doo, which like The Racer was designed by John C. Allen but intended for younger riders.

The portion of the area that borders Rivertown became a subsection of its own called Nickelodeon Splat City when it was revamped in 1995 with the addition of a stage, water attraction, and a children's play area. In 2001, the log ride Kings Mills Log Flume was updated with a children's theme and renamed The Wild Thornberrys River Adventure. The Rugrats Runaway Reptar family inverted roller coaster was introduced the same year. This was an expansion into an area that was originally part of Rivertown, and the Nickelodeon-themed area was renamed Nickelodeon Central. Hanna-Barbera Land was gradually converted to Nickelodeon themes over the next several years and was eventually renamed "Nickelodeon Universe" in 2006, incorporating Nickelodeon Central.

Following Cedar Fair's purchase of the park from Paramount in 2006, Nickelodeon-themed elements were eventually removed and replaced with Peanuts comic strip themes in 2010 – the children's brand marketed at other Cedar Fair (now Six Flags) parks. Nickelodeon Universe became known as Planet Snoopy. The area features many rides intended for smaller children, as well as three family-oriented roller coasters and a skater coaster. Amusement Today awarded Kings Island with the Golden Ticket Award for "Best Kids' Area in the World" for eighteen consecutive years (2001–2018). Kings Island's Planet Snoopy was also the largest in the Cedar Fair chain until 2013, when Kings Dominion doubled the size of its Planet Snoopy section.

Name	Opened	Manufacturer	Model	Description	Thrill rating
Character Carousel	1982	Chance Rides	36-Foot Carrousel	Children's carousel. Formerly known as Hanna Barbera Carousel (1982–2005) and Nick-O-Round (2006–2009).	1
Charlie Brown's Wind Up	1992	Zamperla	Chair swing ride	Formerly known as Flintstone's Flyers (1992–1997), Pixie and Dixie's Swingset (1998–2005), and Backyardigans Swing-Along (2006–2009).	1
Joe Cool's Dodgem School	1976	Jurgen Schmidt, Rivervaze, NJ	Children's bumper cars.	Formerly known as Boulder Bumpers (1976–2005) and Jimmy Neutron's Atom Smasher (2006–2009).	2
Kite Eating Tree	2006	Zamperla	Jumpin' Star	A mini-drop ride that lifts riders 20 feet (6.1 m) into the air that bounces up and down as the ride eventually lowers to the ground. Formerly known as Plankton's Plunge (2006–2009).	3
Linus' Beetle Bugs	1972	William F. Mangels	Whip Jr.	Classic whip ride. Operated at Coney Island (1967–1971). Formerly known as Screecher, Funky Phantom, Alley Cat 500 and Swiper's Sweepers (2006–2009).	2
PEANUTS 500	1979	Venture Ride Manufacturer Inc.	Drivable car ride.	Formerly known as Mr. Jinks Jalopies (1979–??), Kiddie Turnpike, Fender Bender 500 (??–2005) and Nick Jr. Drivers (2006–2009).	1
PEANUTS Off-Road Rally	1972	Hampton Amusement Corporation	Miniature carousel car ride.	Operated at Coney Island (1969–1971). Formerly known as Pee Wee Raceway, Motor Mouse, Huck's Hotrods, and Go Diego Go!.	1
PEANUTS Showplace	2018	—N/a	Live Show Venue	Located near The Great Pumpkin Coaster	—N/a
Sally's Sea Plane	1998	Zamperla	Crazy Bus	Formerly known as Atom Ant's Airways (1998–2005) and Timmy's Airtours (2006–2009).	2
Snoopy vs. Red Baron	1992	Zamperla	Mini Jet	Themed after the comic strip featuring Snoopy vs. the Red Baron. Formerly known as Red Baron's Bi-Planes (1992–1997), Dick Dastardly's Biplanes (1998–2005) and Blue's Skidoo (2006–2009).	2
Snoopy's Junction	1982	Mack Rides	Guided rail train cars.	Formerly known as Scooby Choo (1982–1997), Quick Draw's Railway (1998–2005) and La Adventura de Azul (2006–2009).	1
Snoopy's Space Buggies	2015	Zamperla	Jump Around	A circular flat ride on which vehicles attached to a central console bounce up and down.	2
Surf Dog	2006	Zamperla	Skater Coaster	Surfboard themed roller coaster like ride that spins as it glides over a ramp. Formerly known as Avatar: The Last Airbender (2006–2009).	4
The Great Pumpkin Coaster	1992	E&F Miler Industries	Junior Coaster	A junior steel roller coaster that takes riders up a small hill through a series of dips and then circles back around to complete the circuit for a second time. The ride lasts for roughly 52 seconds. The queue area used to be the loading area for the Smurf's Enchanted Voyage ride. Formerly known as Scooby Zoom (1992–1997), Top Cat's Taxi Jam (1998–2005) and Little Bill's Giggle Coaster (2006–2009).	2
Woodstock Express	1972	Philadelphia Toboggan Coasters	Junior Wooden Coaster	A family wooden roller coaster, formerly known as Scooby Doo (1972–1979), Beastie (1980–2005) and Fairly Odd Coaster (2006–2009). The coaster featured a small tunnel at the base of its first drop from 1980 through 2005.	4
Woodstock Whirlybirds	1998	Caripro Amusement Technology	Helicopter-themed sky tram.	Formerly known as Yogi's Sky Tours (1998–2005) and LazyTown Sportacopters (2006–2009).	2

==== Camp Snoopy ====
For the 2024 season, Kings Island expanded Planet Snoopy with the addition of a new themed subsection named Camp Snoopy. The area debuted a new roller coaster, a Vekoma family Boomerang called Snoopy's Soap Box Racers, as well as children play areas and family-oriented activities. Camp Snoopy incorporates a section of Planet Snoopy that borders Rivertown, which was formerly known as Nickelodeon Central prior to 2006. Several existing attractions located in this area were renamed in the process, including Charlie Brown's Rushing River Log Ride (formerly Race For Your Life Charlie Brown), Franklin's Flyers (formerly Woodstock Gliders), and Woodstock's Air Rail (formerly Flying Ace Aerial Chase).

Name	Opened	Manufacturer	Model	Description	Thrill rating
Beagle Scout Acres	2024	—N/a	—N/a	A covered playground area containing an artificial turf grass floor. Replaced the former Snoopy's Barnyard Friends petting zoo.	—N/a
Charlie Brown's Rushing River Log Ride	1972	Arrow Development/Hopkins Rides	Log Flume	Log flume ride with a Peanuts theme that operated at Coney Island (1968–1971). Formerly known as Kings Mills Log Flume (1972–1999), The Wild Thornberrys River Adventure (2001–2009) and Race For Your Life Charlie Brown (2010–2023).	4
Franklin's Flyers	2015	Larson International	Flying Scooters	A flying scooters ride with eight carriages that each have a paddle, enabling guests to change the movement of the carriage. Formerly known as Woodstock Gliders (2015–2023).	3
Linus' Launcher	2006	Zamperla	Kite Flyer	Formerly known as Danny Phantoms Phantom Flyers (2006–2009).	3
Snoopy's Soap Box Racers	2024	Vekoma	Family Boomerang	A steel Family Boomerang Coaster model.	4
Woodstock's Air Rail	2001	Vekoma	Suspended family coaster	An inverted roller coaster with a top speed of 26 mph (42 km/h). Formerly known as Rugrats Runaway Reptar (2001–2009) and Flying Ace Aerial Chase (2010–2023).	4

=== Rivertown ===
Rivertown is an area within the park that features a western theme depicting a town with ranch-style buildings, old wooden signs, and one of the park's most iconic attractions, the Kings Island & Miami Valley Railroad. Originally intended to be named Frontier Land, the area was eventually named Rivertown when it debuted with the park in 1972. The area included attractions such as Kings Mill Log Flume and Shawnee Landing, a canoe ride in a part of Rivertown known as Kenton's Cove.

Throughout the 1970s, Rivertown saw the addition of several attractions including Kenton's Cove Keelboat Canal in 1973, which was an elevated log flume ride that operated through the 2000 season, and The Beast roller coaster in 1979. Designed internally by Kings Island, The Beast opened as the tallest, fastest, and longest roller coaster in the world, and in addition to retaining its record length, it remains one of the most popular wooden roller coasters in the annual Golden Ticket Awards from Amusement Today. Other rides added over the years include a river rafting ride called White Water Canyon, which opened in 1985, and a heavily themed, indoor flat ride called Tomb Raider: The Ride (later renamed The Crypt), which opened in place of Kenton's Cove Keelboat Canal in 2002. The Crypt closed permanently in 2011.

In 2009, the park's first roller coaster from Bolliger & Mabillard, called Diamondback, opened in Rivertown. The 230-foot-tall (70 m) hypercoaster reaches a top speed of 80 mph (130 km/h) and features a splashdown water effect finale. In August 2016, Kings Island revealed plans to build Mystic Timbers a 109-foot-tall (33 m) wooden roller coaster that opened in 2017. The new ride added 3,265 feet (995 m) of track bringing the park's wooden coaster total to 18,804 feet (5,731 m), making it the most of any amusement park in the world.

Name	Opened	Manufacturer	Model	Description	Thrill rating
Diamondback	2009	Bolliger & Mabillard	Hyper coaster	A steel hypercoaster that is 230 feet (70 m) tall and 5,282 feet (1,610 m) long with a top speed of 80 mph (130 km/h). Diamondback spans 10 acres (4.0 ha) of terrain and features a splashdown water effect finale.	5
Kings Island & Miami Valley Railroad	1972	Crown Metal Products Company	3 ft (914 mm) narrow-gauge 4-4-0 Steam Train	A steam locomotive ride that travels in a 5,585-foot (1,702 m) loop that provides transportation between the main park and Soak City. Before the water park and its station were built, the train ride was a narrated excursion, traversing open fields and wooded areas with multiple props themed to the old west, small buildings and a fort. The trains are scale replicas of the famous 1800s locomotive known as The General.	1
Mystic Timbers	2017	Great Coasters International	Custom	A wooden roller coaster that is 109.2 feet (33.3 m) tall and 3,265 feet (995 m) long with a top speed of 53 mph (85 km/h). The attraction ends with an indoor segment, heavily marketed with the hashtag #WhatsintheShed, that includes one of three projected monsters and various animated props.	5
The Beast	1979	Kings Island	Custom	Built and designed by the park, The Beast consistently ranks as one of the top wooden coasters in the world. When it first opened, it held virtually every major record for roller coasters (tallest, fastest and longest). As of 2014, it still holds the record as the longest wooden roller coaster in the world according to Guinness World Records. The ride takes advantage of the hilly terrain and has two separate chain lifts throughout the course.	5
White Water Canyon	1985	Intamin	Rapid Ride	River rafting ride that takes riders on a winding course through the densely wooded terrain in Kings Island's Rivertown. Riders are placed in circular inner-tube rafts that seat up to six. Whirlpools, hidden geysers and wave-makers randomly soak riders along the route. It is one of the longest rides in the park at 5 minutes and 20 seconds.	4

=== Soak City ===
Included with park admission, Soak City is a 33-acre (13 ha) water park featuring two wave pools, several children's areas and a variety of water slides. It originally opened in 1989 as WaterWorks and has since been expanded several times. It was renamed in 2004 to Crocodile Dundee's Boomerang Bay, based on the titular character from the film "Crocodile" Dundee, played by Paul Hogan who was also hired to promote the revamped water park. Following Cedar Fair's acquisition of Kings Island, it was later renamed Boomerang Bay, and all references to the film character were removed. On September 2, 2011, Kings Island announced a $10-million expansion of the water park for the 2012 season, as well as a plan to rename it Soak City. Tropical Plunge, a seven-story water slide complex, was added for the 2016 season. In 2025 Kings Island expanded Soak City with the addition of RiverRacers and Splash River Junction, a dual-racing water coaster and a new children's water play area respectively.

== Seasonal events ==
=== Halloween Haunt ===

Halloween Haunt is a Halloween-themed event at Kings Island that operates on weekends from September through October. It features haunted houses, mazes, live shows, and most of the park's regular season attractions. Special lighting and fog effects are used throughout the park, and actors in costume engage with guests. The event originally debuted as FearFest in 2000, and the name was later changed to Halloween Haunt in 2007.

=== Winterfest ===
Winterfest is an annual Christmas-themed holiday festival that operates from mid-November through late December, featuring ice skating on the Royal Fountain as well as the special lighting throughout the park. Some rides and attractions are in operation, and International Street is transformed into a winter village filled with Christmas carolers, homemade crafts, and holiday-themed refreshments and snacks. The event debuted in 1982 and returned annually through 1992, followed by a brief return in 2005. Under Cedar Fair's ownership, the park listened to guest feedback and brought Winterfest back in 2017. They planned several years in advance to increase the scale of the event, which showcases over 5 million color-changing lights and dozens of live performances each night.

== Fast Lane ==
Fast Lane, introduced at Kings Island in July 2011, is a secondary queue system that offers shorter wait times on the park's most popular rides. In addition to the standard admission charge, visitors can bypass the standard wait line by purchasing a wrist band that grants access to the Fast Lane queue. A limited number of wrist bands are sold each day. For a period of time through the 2024 season, Kings Island offered Fright Lane passes – for Halloween Haunt attractions only – that operated similarly to Fast Lane. In 2025, this was renamed the "Haunted Attractions Express Pass".

== Significant facts ==
=== Notable changes and additions ===
- 1977: Screamin' Demon debuts as one of the first forward- and backward-looping roller coasters in the United States.
- 1979: Kings Island unveils The Beast; the world's tallest, fastest, and longest roller coaster.
- 1981: The Bat opens as the first modern-day suspended roller coaster in the world. Plagued with mechanical problems and downtime, The Bat was removed in August 1983.
- 1982: An annual Christmas event called Winterfest debuts, which operates from late-November through December.
- 1984: King Cobra opens as the first roller coaster designed from inception as a stand-up coaster.
- 1987: Vortex is added to the park's coaster lineup, briefly holding a world record for its six inversions.
- 1989: WaterWorks debuts as a family water park included with the price of admission, featuring a wave pool, water slides, and other attractions.
- 1996: The Outer Limits: Flight of Fear, an indoor launched looping roller coaster themed to The Outer Limits opens in the Coney Mall section of the park, becoming the first roller coaster to be powered by a magnetic launch system. After the 2000 season, the trains were retrofitted with lap bars and Paramount's licensing to use The Outer Limits expired, removing any mentions of the sci-fi TV series from the attraction.
- 1999: The Adventure Village area begins the first of a two-year expansion, renamed Paramount Action Zone and rethemed as a movie studio backlot. Two new rides – FACE/OFF and Drop Zone: Stunt Tower – open in the new area, with the latter setting a record for the world's tallest gyro drop.
- 2000: In the second year of expansion, Son of Beast opens in Action Zone as the world's tallest, fastest, and only-looping wooden roller coaster. Billed as a sequel to Kings Island's The Beast, it was also the park's first hypercoaster. A Halloween-themed evening event called FearFest, later renamed Halloween Haunt, debuts in October and begins operating annually at the park every fall season.
- 2002: Tomb Raider: The Ride opens as the first Giant Top Spin from HUSS Park Attractions, which operated indoor and featured special effects themed to the film it was based on. King Cobra is dismantled after downtime and maintenance proved cost prohibitive.
- 2007: Firehawk, a flying roller coaster relocated from Geauga Lake, opens in the X-Base area adjacent to Flight of Fear.
- 2009: The first roller coaster from Bolliger & Mabillard at Kings Island, Diamondback, opens to the public. Son of Beast abruptly closes in June and remained closed indefinitely.
- 2010: Planet Snoopy replaces Nickelodeon Universe. All Nickelodeon and Hanna-Barbera theming is removed, marking the first time in park history without an attraction themed to Scooby-Doo.
- 2011: A tower swing ride named WindSeeker opens at the end of the Coney Mall. Fast Lane is introduced for the first time, and Dinosaurs Alive! opens.
- 2012: Boomerang Bay is renamed Soak City, which receives a moderate makeover. Son of Beast is demolished.
- 2014: The longest inverted roller coaster in the world, Banshee, opens on the former location of both Son of Beast and Thunder Alley.
- 2017: A new wooden coaster from Great Coasters International called Mystic Timbers makes its debut. Winterfest also returns after a twelve-year hiatus.
- 2020: Orion is added as the park's first giga coaster, featuring a 300-foot (91 m) drop.
- 2024: Camp Snoopy expansion in Planet Snoopy, which includes the addition of Snoopy's Soap Box Racers.

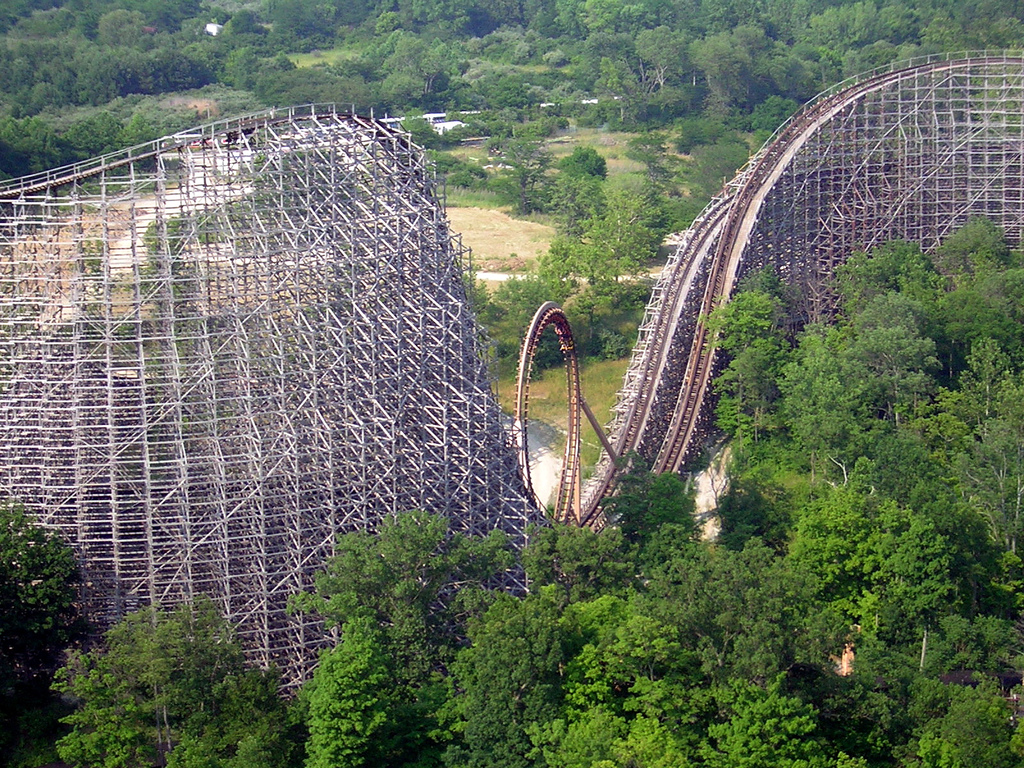
Son of Beast (2000–2009) in its original configuration with the vertical loop.

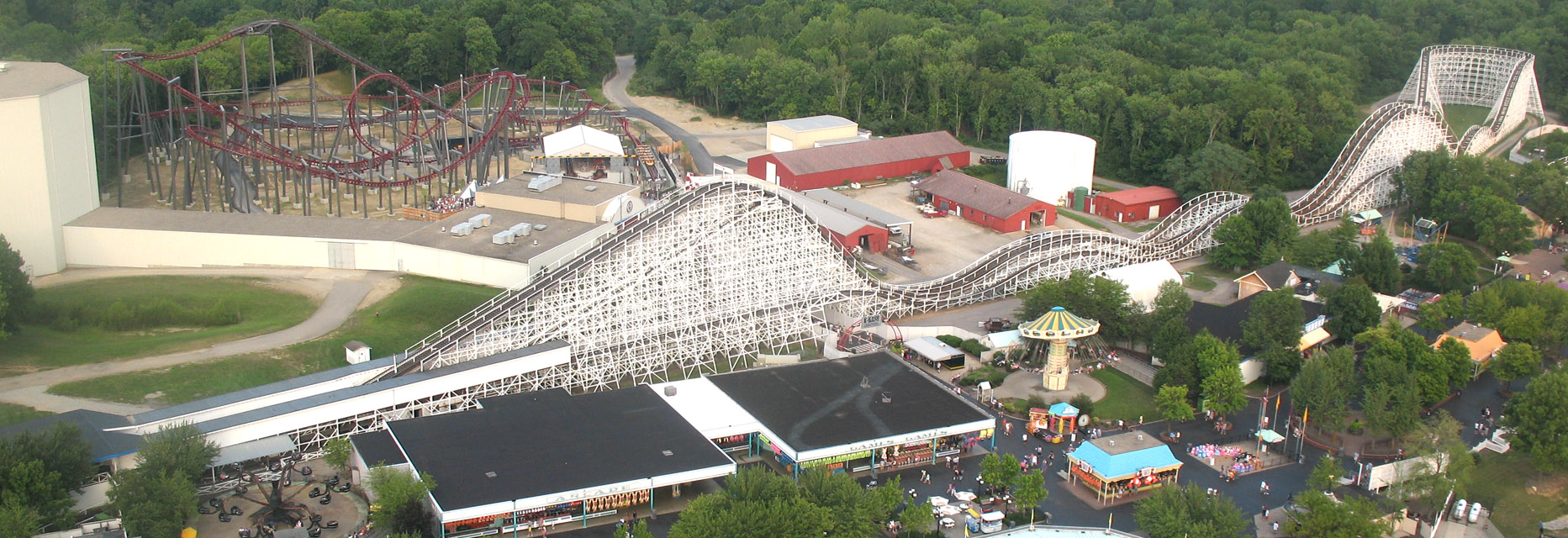
A 2007 aerial view of The Racer (1972), Firehawk (2007–2018) and Flight of Fear (1996).

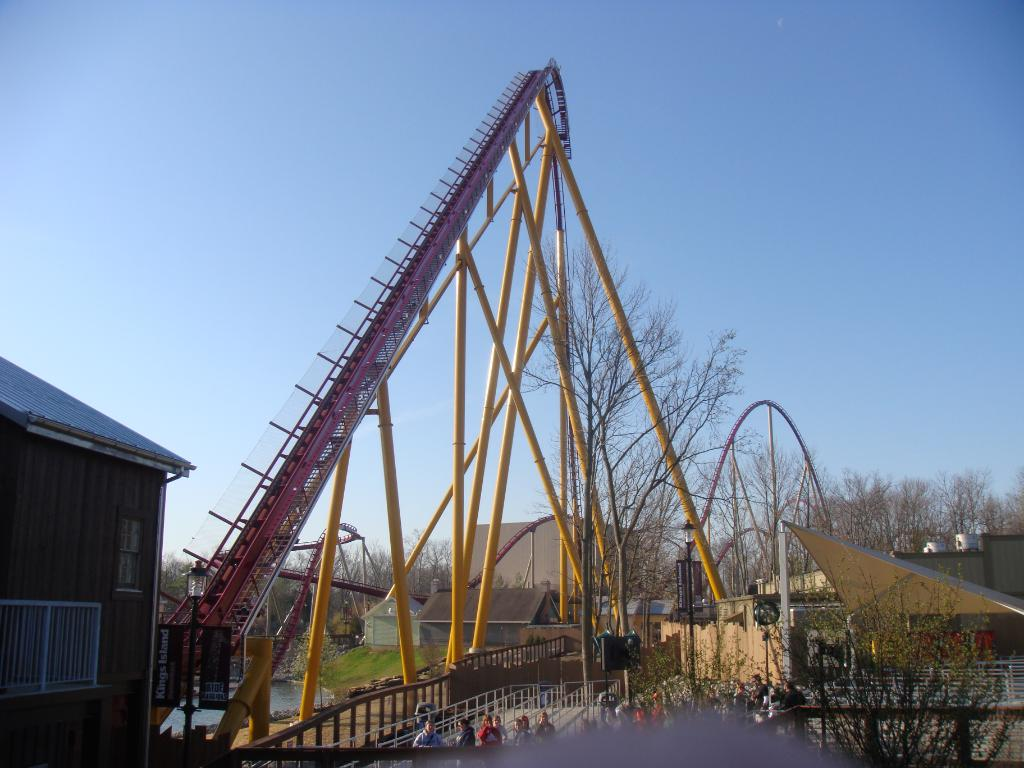
Diamondback (2009), in its original color scheme.

=== Notable events ===
- 1972: Hanna-Barbera produced an animated made-for-television film called The Banana Splits in Hocus Pocus Park, which mixed in live-action sequences filmed at Kings Island, and it aired on ABC in 1972.
- 1972: ABC sitcom The Partridge Family filmed at the park in the episode "I Left My Heart in Cincinnati", which aired on January 26, 1973.
- 1973: ABC sitcom The Brady Bunch filmed at the park in the episode "The Cincinnati Kids", which aired on November 23, 1973.
- 1974: Sixty-nine-year-old Karl Wallenda broke a world skywalk distance record of 1,800 feet (550 m).
- October 25, 1975: A nationally televised event featured Evel Knievel successfully jumping fourteen Greyhound buses at Kings Island, clearing a record-breaking distance of 133 feet (41 m) which stood until 1999.
- June 9, 1991: Three people are killed in two unrelated incidents at the park. The day is known as "Black Sunday" in park lore.
- May 24, 2008: Robbie Knievel, son of Evel, successfully jumped over 24 Coke Zero trucks in the Kings Island Parking Lot. This was expected to be the last of Robbie's big jumps.
- July 4, 2008: High wire artist Rick Wallenda broke the world skywalk distance record of 1,800 feet (550 m) held by his grandfather, Karl Wallenda, by walking 2,000 feet (610 m) on a 75-foot-high wire (23 m) from Kings Island's Eiffel Tower to the park's entrance and back.
- August 31, 2008: Barry Williams, Susan Olsen and Mike Lookinland returned to Kings Island for A Very Brady Reunion, a four-show special of song, dance and Brady Bunch stories.
- August 15, 2009: Nik Wallenda completed a skywalk on a wire suspended 262 feet (80 m) above the ground that extended 800 feet (240 m). Although it did not break any world records, it was the highest skywalk Nik had completed to date and was three times higher than the skywalk Rick Wallenda performed a year earlier.
- May 19, 2013: Former Brady Bunch stars Barry Williams, Susan Olsen and Christopher Knight returned to the park to "entertain park guests during four shows of singing, dancing and Brady Bunch anecdotes".
- 2022: Kings Island celebrated its 50th Anniversary season.

=== Notable people ===
The following is a list of former employees at Kings Island that later became well known in another industry:

- Curtis Cregan (actor) – worked as a live shows performer and emcee for the Nickelodeon show at Kings Island
- Carmen Electra (singer) – started her professional career in 1990 as a dancer at Kings Island in the show "It's Magic"
- Woody Harrelson (actor) – wood carver at Kings Island during high school
- Justin Jeffre (singer) – part of quartet that performed throughout the park
- Lewis Johnson (reporter) – former rides supervisor on the Beast and Racer roller coasters at Kings Island (1981–87)
- Nick Lachey (singer) – part of quartet that performed throughout the park
- Dan Patrick (TV/radio sports host) – worked on park's golf course grounds crew
- Susan Perkins (1978 Miss America) – worked at the park as a live shows performer
- Gigi Rice (actress)
- Doug Jones (actor)

== Other notable facilities ==
=== Dogstreet Cemetery ===
Dogstreet Cemetery is located at the north end of the Kings Island parking lot and is maintained by Deerfield Township. The historic cemetery dates back to 1803. The Warren County Genealogical Society documented nearly 70 grave sites in the cemetery, though as of 2005, only 52 headstones remained.

On January 11, 2012, the amusement park and cemetery were featured on season 8, episode 1 of Ghost Hunters entitled Roller Ghoster. The show investigated claims of haunted occurrences inside the park and around the cemetery, particularly of a ghost reportedly known as "Missouri Jane." Warren County Genealogical Society records document a grave for a Missouri Jane Galeenor, who died in 1846 at age five.

=== Kings Island resort ===
As part of the Kings Island resort, in 1972 Taft Broadcasting Company built a golf course, hotel and campground.

- The Golf Center at Kings Island - Designed by Jack Nicklaus with Desmond Muirhead, the 18-hole "Grizzly" and the 9-hole "Bruin" golf courses are located just across Interstate 71. The "Grizzly" was used for PGA and LPGA tournaments throughout the years. The Kings Island golf courses were formerly known as the Jack Nicklaus Golf Center, Jack Nicklaus Sports Center and The Jack Nicklaus Golden Bear Golf Courses.
- Kings Island Inn – Designed to depict a small alpine village, the 300-room inn, also known as Kings Island Resort & Conference Center was located on Kings Island Drive across the street from the park. It featured a restaurant, indoor and outdoor pools, tennis court, sand volleyball, half-court basketball and a conference center. The inn was also featured in the Partridge Family's episode "I Left My Heart in Cincinnati" and the Brady Bunch episode "The Cincinnati Kids". The inn and conference center closed in 2014.
- Kings Island Campground was a 45-acre (18 ha) campground that opened with the park in 1972. It featured rental cabins, RV pull-through sites with hookups, tent sites, shower house, general store, playground, and swimming pool. In the 1990s, it was sold to a private operator, and it closed permanently in 2004. A large portion of the land was sold to Great Wolf Resorts to develop a Great Wolf Lodge in partnership with Kings Island.

=== Camp Cedar ===
Camp Cedar is a 52-acre (21 ha) outdoor camping resort located less than a mile away from the park, initially opening in 2021 with 73 cottages and 164 RV spaces. Rentals at Camp Cedar include "pay and play" ticket options that provide guests access to Kings Island. The resort was formerly known as Kings Island Camp Cedar until 2023 when Cedar Fair ended its partnership.

=== Kings Island greenhouse ===
The park has its own greenhouse just off of Columbia Road. It can be seen from the top of The Bat's lift hill. It produces the flowers and topiary for the park. Some of their notable work is the "Living Liberty Bell" topiary and working "Flower Clock" near the Eiffel Tower.

== Awards and recognition ==
Award	Year(s)	Poll/Survey	Publication	Recipient	Ref.
Best Kids' Area	2001–2018	Golden Ticket Award	Amusement Today	Kings Island	
Best Concert Venue	2006	Golden Ticket Award	Amusement Today	Timberwolf Amphitheater	
Best New Attraction	2009	NAPHA Members Survey	NAPHA	Diamondback	
Best New Ride	2017	Golden Ticket Award	Amusement Today	Mystic Timbers	
Renaissance Award	2019	Golden Ticket Award	Amusement Today	Kings Island	
Best New Amusement Park Attraction	2020	10Best Readers' Choice Awards	USA Today	Orion	
Publisher's Pick: Park of the Year	2022	Golden Ticket Award	Amusement Today	Kings Island	
Best New Family Attraction	2026	Golden Ticket Award	Amusement Today	Phantom Theater: Opening Nightmare	

=== Attendance ===
Year	Attendance	Seasonal park rank (North America)	Overall rank (North America)	Ref
2017	3.469 million	3rd	15th	
2018	3.486 million	3rd	17th	
2019	3.521 million	3rd	16th	
2020	1.626 million (Note: Attendance impacted by COVID-19 pandemic)	2nd (Note: Rankings impacted by COVID-19 pandemic)	10th	
2021	3.181 million	3rd	17th	

== See also ==
- Incidents at Kings Island
