= Eiffel Tower (Six Flags) =

Replica in amusement parks

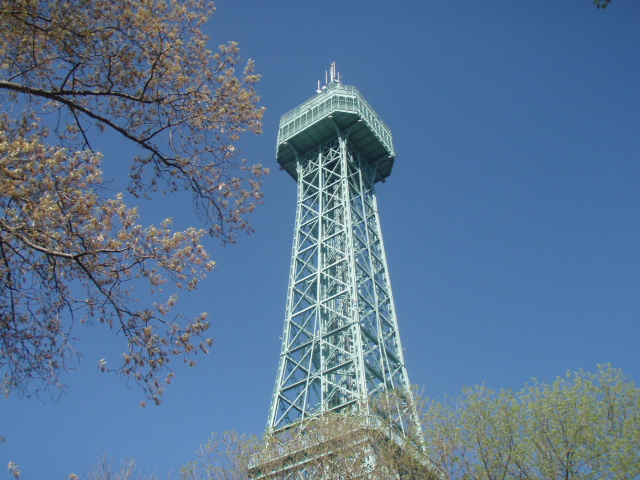

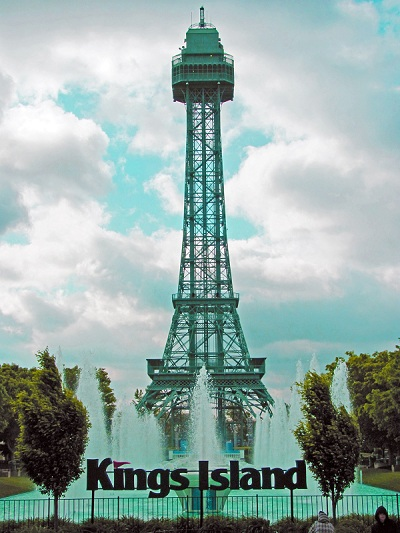
- Picture 1: The Eiffel Tower at Kings Dominion Picture 2: The Eiffel Tower at Kings Island

Kings Dominion
- Area: International Street
- Coordinates: 37°50′24.07″N 77°26′43.66″W
- Status: Operating
- Opening date: May 3, 1975

Kings Island
- Area: International Street
- Coordinates: 39°20′36.12″N 84°16′1.21″W
- Status: Operating
- Opening date: April 29, 1972

Ride statistics
- Manufacturer: Intamin
- Model: Eiffel Tower
- Height: 314 ft (96 m)
- Capacity: 2000 riders per hour
- Vehicle type: Elevator
- Vehicles: 2
- Riders per vehicle: 35
- Fast Lane available at Kings Island

The two Eiffel Towers in Six Flags parks—one at Kings Dominion and one at Kings Island—are replicas of the Eiffel Tower in Paris, France. They each opened with their respective park, the first at Kings Island in 1972 and the second at Kings Dominion in 1975.

== Statistics ==
Both structures are one-third scale replicas of the Eiffel Tower in Paris. They were both constructed by then-owner Taft Broadcasting. The tower at Kings Island stands 314 feet (96 m) tall, while the tower at Kings Dominion is taller due to an additional antenna structure, standing at 331 feet (101 m). The observation decks of each are at 278 feet (85 m) and 264 feet (80 m) high. A third observation deck exists at the 50 feet (15 m) level on each tower, however both are closed to the public. Two high-speed elevators take guests up to the upper observation decks at a rate of 10 feet (3 m) per second. On a clear day guests can see up to 18 miles (29 km) out from the upper observation decks.

== History ==
Prior to Kings Island's construction from 1970-1972, Taft Broadcasting contemplated building an Eiffel Tower replica at Coney Island in Cincinnati, Ohio. When repeated flooding forced the park's closure, the decision was made to create a new park further inland. The plans for an Eiffel Tower replica at Coney Island were scrapped and reused as the centerpiece for its replacement park, Kings Island.

Placed at the end of International Street, the Eiffel Tower was built as the center point for Kings Island and subsequently Kings Dominion as well and can be seen from almost anywhere within either park. It serves a similar purpose to Cinderella Castle at the Magic Kingdom in Walt Disney World, drawing guests' eyes down the street and up along its structure. The towers are popular backdrops for guest photos. For its third park, Canada's Wonderland, Taft Broadcasting chose to construct Wonder Mountain at the west end of International Street instead of building a third replica of the Eiffel Tower.

Despite being located in nearly identically-planned areas of Kings Dominion and Kings Island, the two towers now have drastically different sightlines. In their original 1972 and 1975 iterations, the views along either International Street provided uninterrupted views of the tower. By 1982, both parks began the process of redesigning their International Streets to move their trees closer to the fountains while moving the pathways closer to the buildings. By 2015 these trees had grown to full size, partially obstructing the views of the tower along each street. During the Winter 2018 and early Spring 2019 off-season, Kings Island revitalized their International Street area and replaced its trees, once again allowing uninterrupted views of the Eiffel Tower from anywhere in the entrance area.

Today, guests can still ride an elevator to the top of the Eiffel Tower at Kings Dominion and at Kings Island. During the Halloween season, both parks place large red eyes on one of the upper observation decks. For Kings Island's 2024 Halloween Haunt event the pair of eyes facing International Street were upgraded to blink or look around when activated by guests. Starting in 1982, Kings Island transformed their Eiffel Tower into the world's tallest Christmas Tree using long strands of lights for the park's Winterfest event. The tradition returned when then-owners Paramount Parks brought the event back in 2005. After another hiatus Kings Island, now owned by Cedar Fair (Six Flags), decorated the Eiffel Tower using programmable light strands that can display custom lighting and image patterns. Kings Dominion decorated their Eiffel Tower for Winterfest from 2017 until 2024, after which that park's Winterfest event was cancelled.

=== Kings Island ===
The Eiffel Tower at Kings Island was erected by Southern Ohio Fabricators, and designed by Intamin Inc. The steel for the tower was manufactured by Donawitz Steel Mill in Leoben, Austria. Built to be a 1/3 scale of the real Eiffel Tower in Paris, France, it is the centerpiece of the park. The tower is located at the southern end of International Street and serves as a backdrop for the Royal Fountain and the Kings Island sign. It is currently the second tallest attraction at Kings Island: it is one foot shy of Drop Tower for being the tallest. 15,000 bolts hold together the structure with 410 steps leading to the top. Unlike the tower at Kings Dominion, Kings Island's tower features Fast Lane which enables visitors to get to the front of the line without waiting. The Eiffel Tower has been painted four times since its initial construction in 1972. Sherwin Williams provided the original coat for the structure and sponsored the Eiffel Tower in 1972. Three repainting efforts after 1972 took place in 1989, 2004, and 2021. In late 2021, Baynum Painting undertook the task of painting Kings Island's Eiffel Tower for the park's 2022 50th anniversary celebration using the color "Eiffel Tower Green".

=== Kings Dominion ===
The Eiffel Tower at Kings Dominion was built by Bristol Steel. It is a twin with the similar structure at Kings Island, and was built to open with the park in 1975. It is the centerpiece of the park, located at the south end of International Street, beyond the fountains and main entrance of the park. It is currently the tallest attraction at Kings Dominion if measured by the top of the structure. It is the 4th tallest if measured by the observation platform with Drop Tower, Pantherian 305 feet (93 m) and WindSeeker being taller. It was constructed using 450 tons of steel. Elevators in the replica were installed by Haushahn Elevator of Austria with subsequent modernizations and upgrades in recent years. Kings Dominion's Eiffel Tower was repainted in 2019. The tower's observation decks reopened in 2025 after an extended closure in time for the park's 50th anniversary celebration.

== Gallery ==
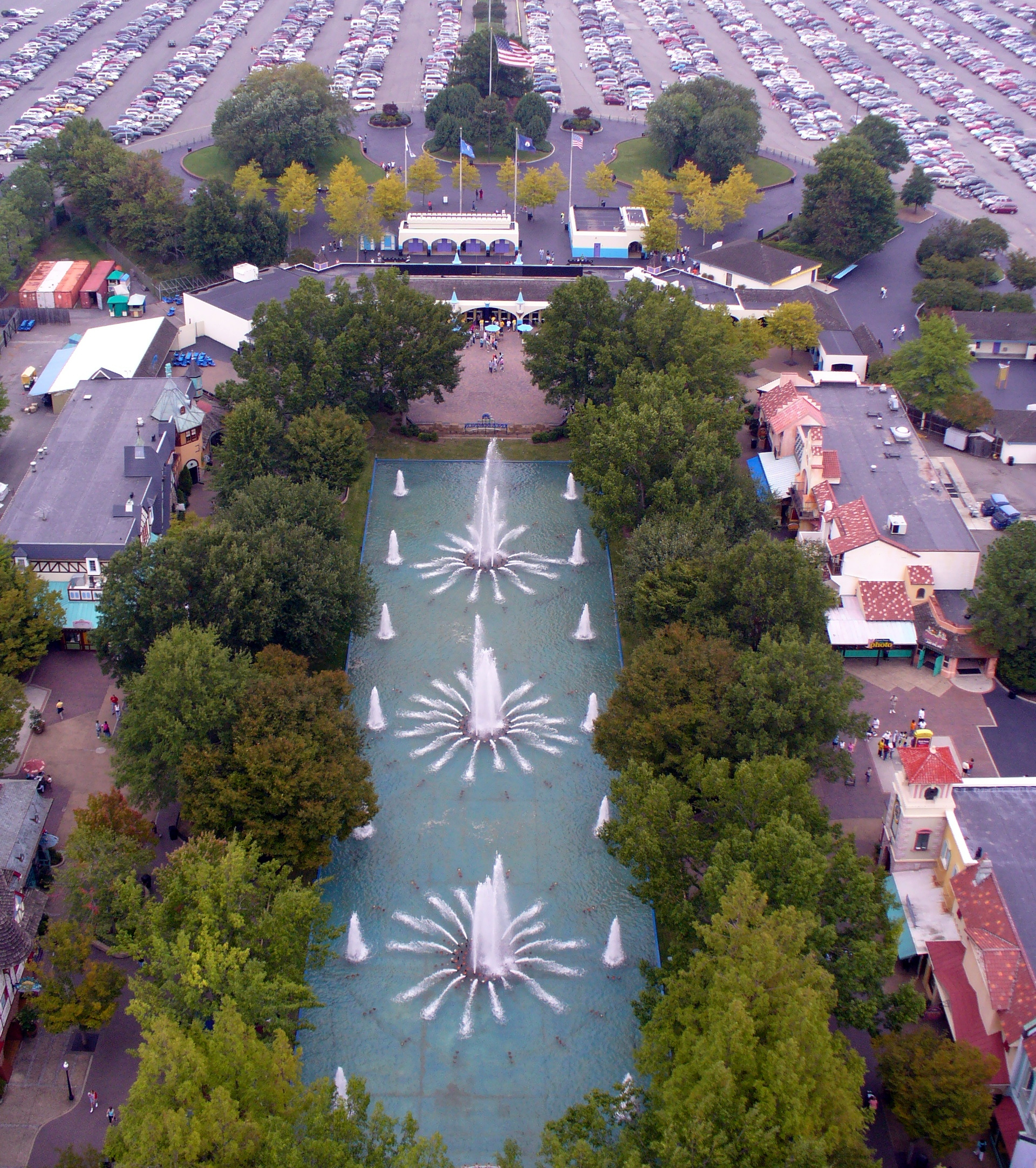
View from the upper observation deck at Kings Dominion.

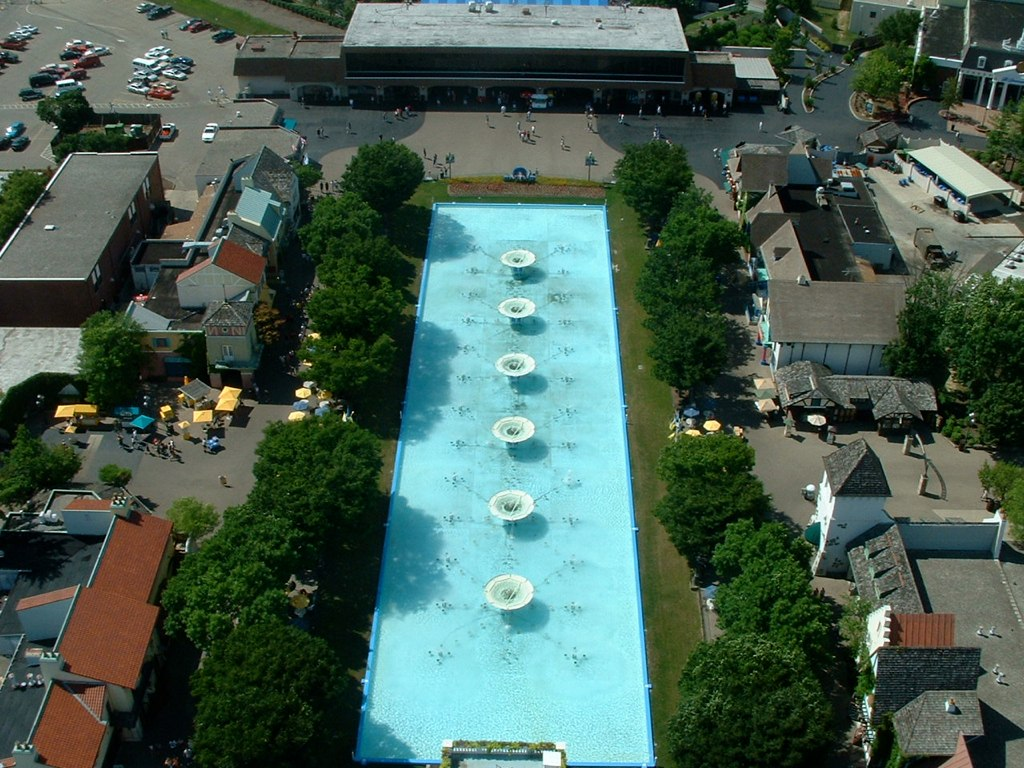
View from the upper observation deck at Kings Island, before the 2019 International Street redesign.

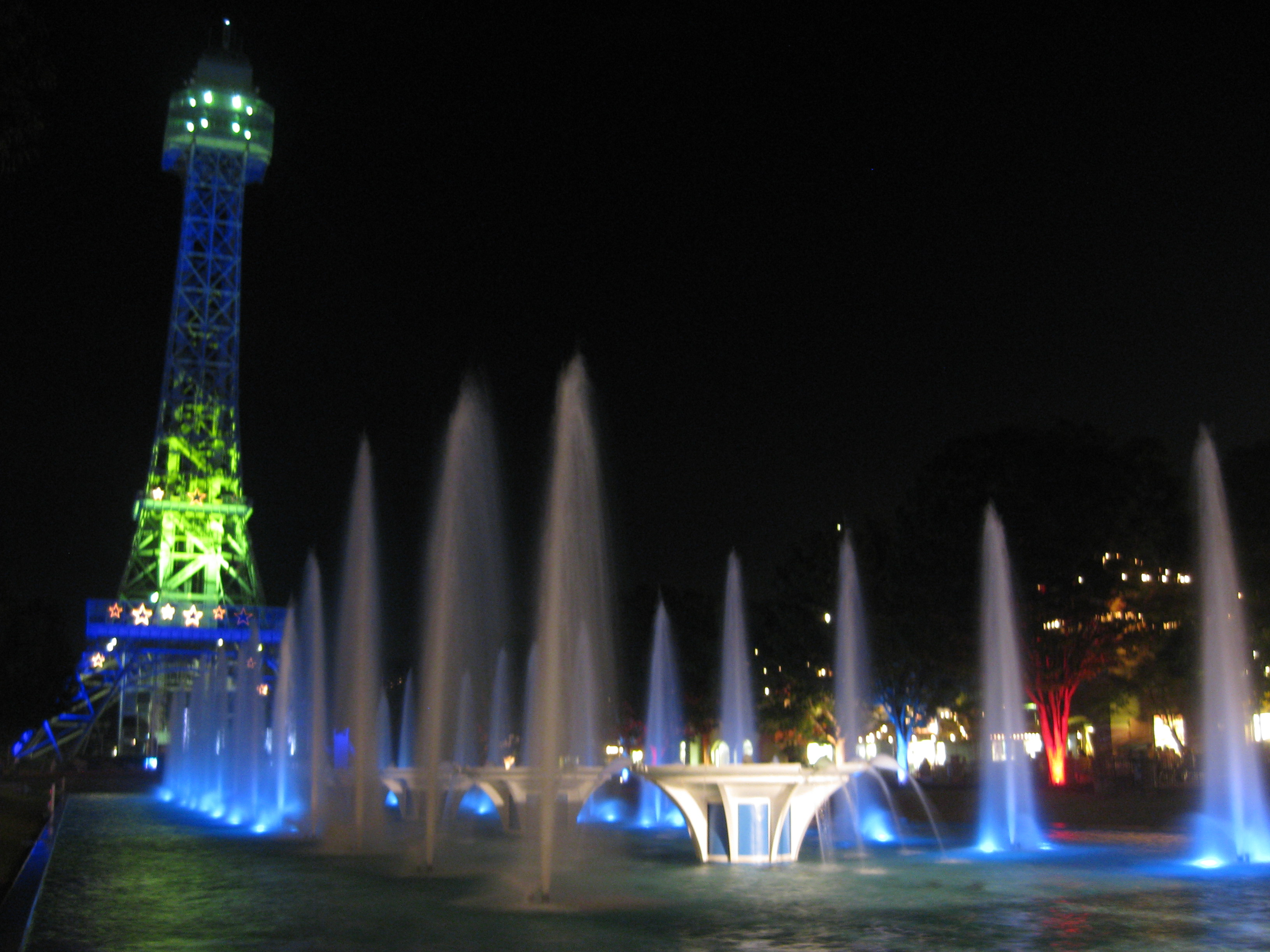
Kings Island's Eiffel Tower at night, before the 2019 International Street redesign.

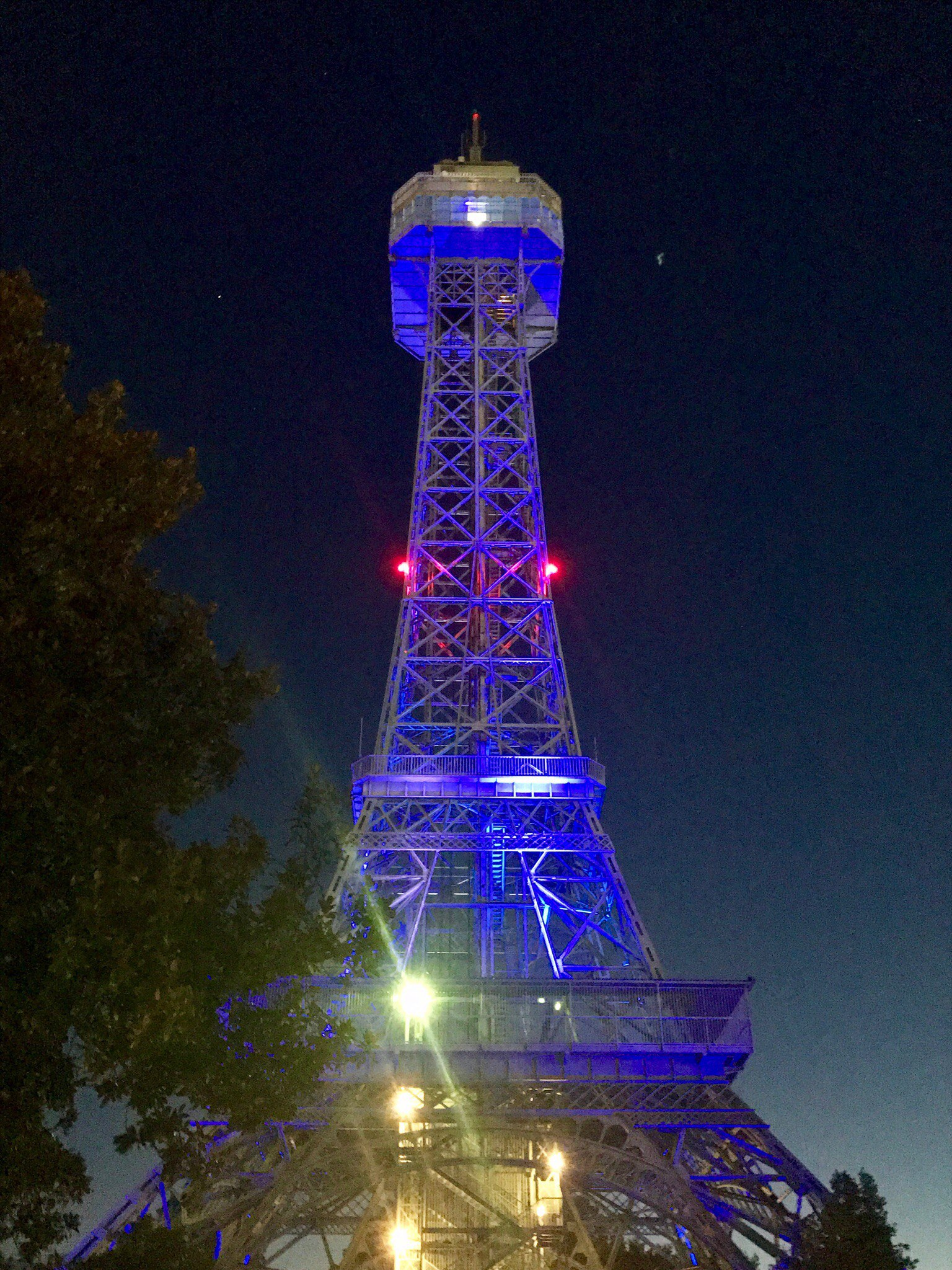
Kings Dominion's Eiffel Tower at night.
