= White Water Canyon =

River rapids ride

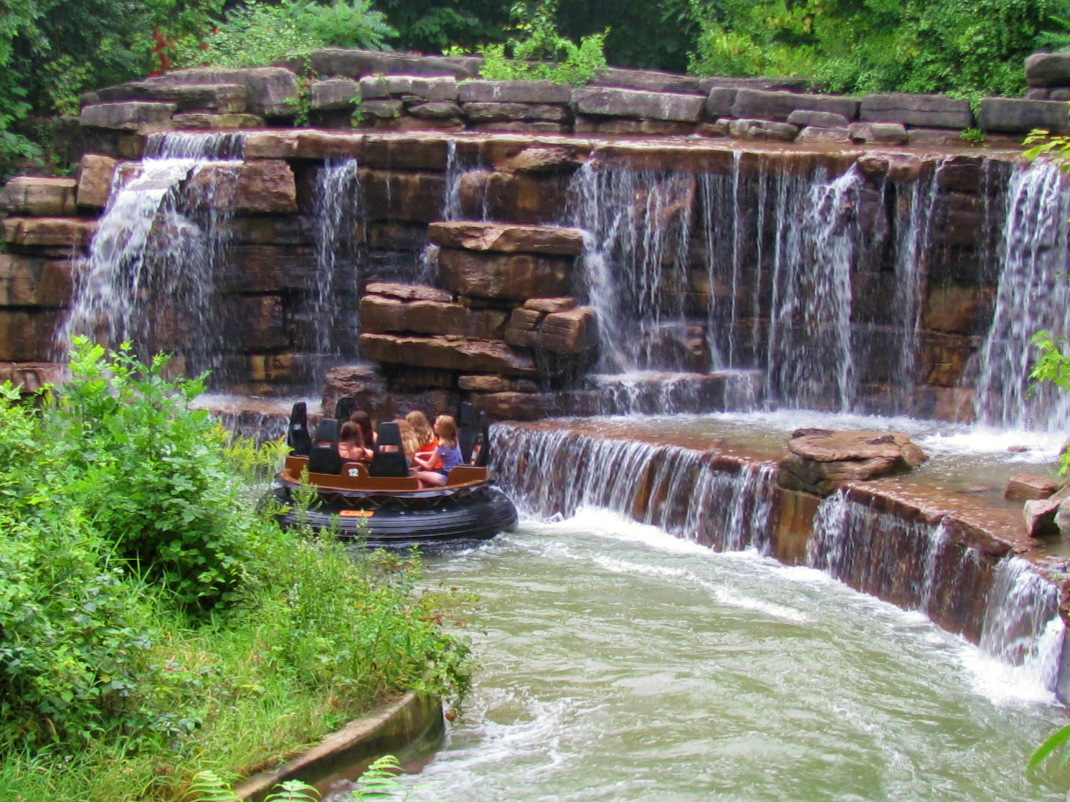
- White Water Canyon at Canada's Wonderland

Canada's Wonderland
- Area: Frontier Canada
- Coordinates: 43°50′23.66″N 79°32′44.73″W
- Status: Operating
- Opening date: 1984

Kings Dominion
- Area: Old Virginia
- Coordinates: 37°50′19.54″N 77°26′52.69″W
- Status: Operating
- Opening date: 1983

Kings Island
- Area: Rivertown
- Coordinates: 39°20′24.34″N 84°16′9.54″W
- Status: Operating
- Opening date: 1985

General statistics
- Type: River rafting ride
- Manufacturer: Intamin
- Length: 1,678 ft (511 m)
- Duration: 5:20
- Restraint style: Ring in centre of boat and seat belt
- Height restriction: 46 in (117 cm)
- Fast Lane available at Kings Dominion

White Water Canyon is a river rapids ride located in the Six Flags parks, Canada's Wonderland, Kings Dominion, and Kings Island that were installed when they were owned by Kings Entertainment Company. The attraction features six seat raft-styled boats.

== Locations ==
- Canada's Wonderland - Frontier Canada
- Kings Dominion - Old Virginia
- Kings Island - Rivertown
- Thunder Canyon, similar ride at other Six Flags parks

=== Kings Island ===
For the 2016 season, White Water Canyon received a new entrance at Kings Island for the construction of Mystic Timbers.
