= Splash Zone =

A splash zone occurs when lowering heavy loads into water.

Splash zone may also refer to the supralittoral zone, the area above a high-tide line.

Splash Zone may refer to:

- Splash Zone (Timberwolf Falls), a bridge next to a ride at Canada's Wonderland
- Splash Zone (Gulliver's Land), an indoor water playground
- Splash Zone (Gulliver's World), an indoor water playground
- Splash Zone Water Park, a water park in Wildwood, New Jersey, United States
