= Silver Streak (Canada's Wonderland) =

Roller coaster

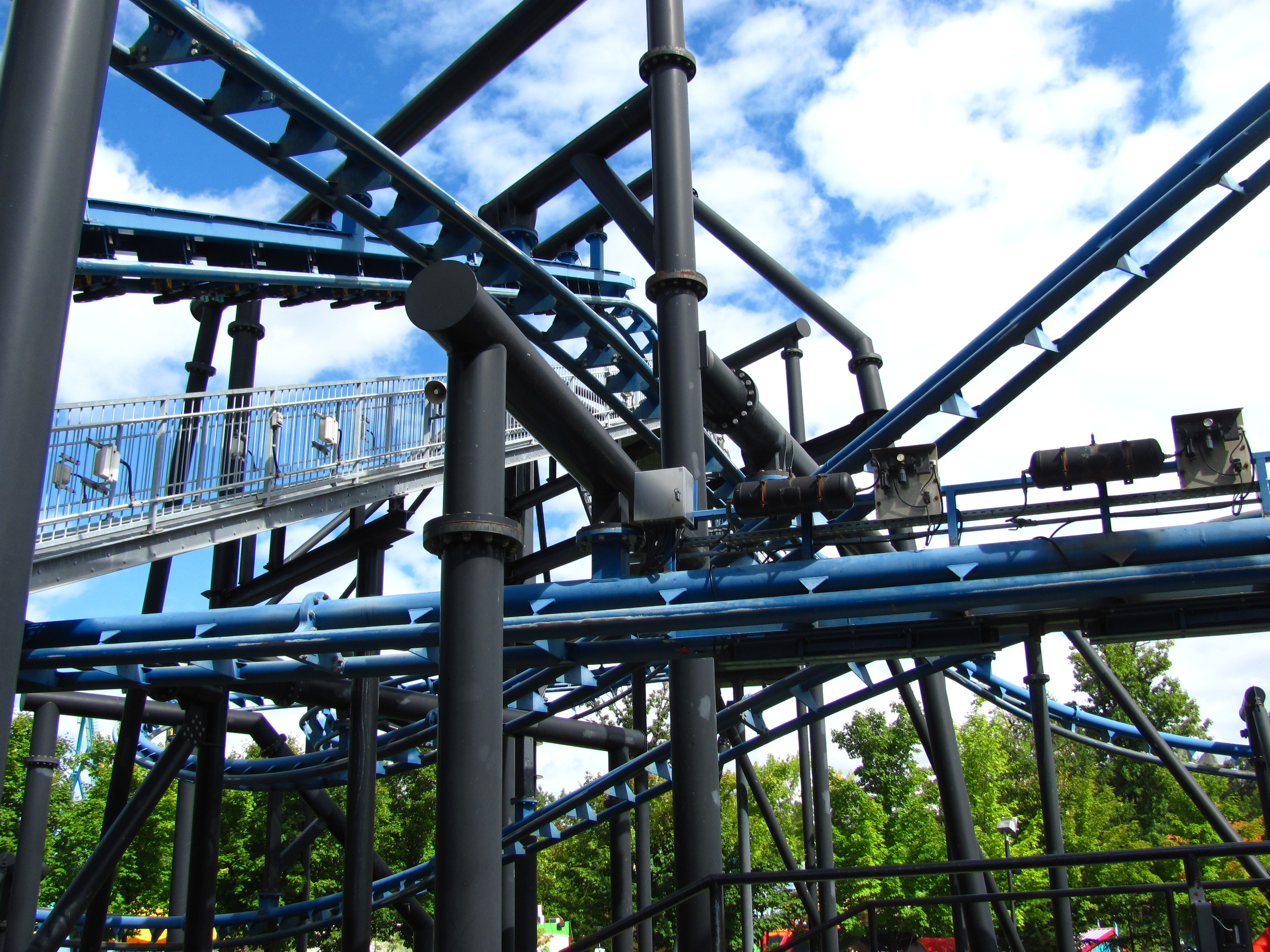

Canada's Wonderland
- Location: Canada's Wonderland
- Park section: KidZville
- Coordinates: 43.8424°N 79.5462°W
- Status: Operating
- Opening date: May 6, 2001

General statistics
- Type: Steel – Inverted
- Manufacturer: Vekoma
- Model: Suspended Family Coaster
- Lift/launch system: Booster Wheel Lift Hill
- Height: 48.6 ft (14.8 m)
- Length: 1,122.1 ft (342.0 m)
- Speed: 26 mph (42 km/h)
- Inversions: 0
- Duration: 1:16
- Capacity: 650 riders per hour
- Height restriction: 44 in (112 cm)
- Trains: Single train with 10 cars; riders arranged 2 across in a single row for a total of 20 riders per train
- Silver Streak at RCDB

Silver Streak is a Vekoma inverted roller coaster at Canada's Wonderland in Vaughan, Ontario. The coaster is geared towards families and children, and is often seen as a junior version of the park's existing DareDeviler roller coaster.

== History ==
Silver Streak is found in the Kidzville area of the park. Built alongside children's rides Jumping Jet and Blast Off as a brand new area known as Zoom Zone, which debuted in 2001 at the same time that Shockwave opened in the International Festival section of the park. These three family rides officially opened to the public on May 6, 2001, replacing the Jumbo Bumps attraction, and the entrance to their common plaza can be found by Frequent Flyers. Today, in the Six Flags era, Zoom Zone is no longer a listed area of the park but signage still covers the plaza. Silver Streak occupies the majority of the section, and is by far the largest attraction in Kidzville.

As of 2019, the ride has a height requirement of 46 inches.

== Characteristics ==
=== Model ===
Silver Streak was designed and manufactured by Dutch amusement firm Vekoma, who also designed the park's Flight Deck and The Bat coasters. It is currently one of seven of Vekoma's 342m Suspended Family Coaster (SFC) models.

=== Statistics ===
Silver Streak has an overall length of roughly 1,122.1 ft (342 m), a height of 48.6 ft (14.8 m), and a total speed of 26 mph (42 km/h). The coaster is located on a 193.6 ft by 121.4 ft plot of land.

=== Train ===
Silver Streak operates with a single 20-passenger open-air train. The train utilizes soft over-the-shoulder restraints, thus minimizing any possible head-banging on the ride.

=== Layout ===
The coaster's layout is vastly similar to those of Vekoma's 335m Junior Coaster layout. After making a right hand turn, the train is pushed up the lift hill by booster wheels, all the way to the 48.6 foot height. It then proceeds into a helix and some other wide turns before hitting the brake run and making a right turn into the station. One cycle of the ride has an approximate duration of 1 minute and 16 seconds.

== Similar rides ==
Woodstock’s Air Rail is an identical model of Silver Streak opened that same year at Kings Island in Mason, Ohio, under the name Rugrats Runaway Reptar. It was however renamed to Flying Ace Ariel Chase in 2010 under Cedar Fair management. Then renamed to its current name in 2024. Another identical model also opened at Carowinds in 2003 following the success of the first two, under the name Rugrats Runaway Reptar. It was however renamed to Flying Ace Ariel Chase in 2010 until its retheme to Kiddy Hawk during the 2017-2018 offseason.
