= Halloween Haunt =

Halloween Haunt may refer to several Halloween events at Six Flags amusement parks:

- HalloWeekends (Cedar Point)
- Halloween Haunt (California's Great America), a now-defunct event
- Halloween Haunt (Canada's Wonderland)
- Halloween Haunt (Dorney Park)
- Halloween Haunt (Kings Dominion)
- Halloween Haunt (Kings Island)
- Halloween Haunt (Worlds of Fun)
- Knott's Scary Farm
- SCarowinds
- ValleyScare
