= Canada's Wonderland =

Amusement park in Vaughan, Ontario, Canada

- Previously known as Paramount Canada's Wonderland (1993–2006)

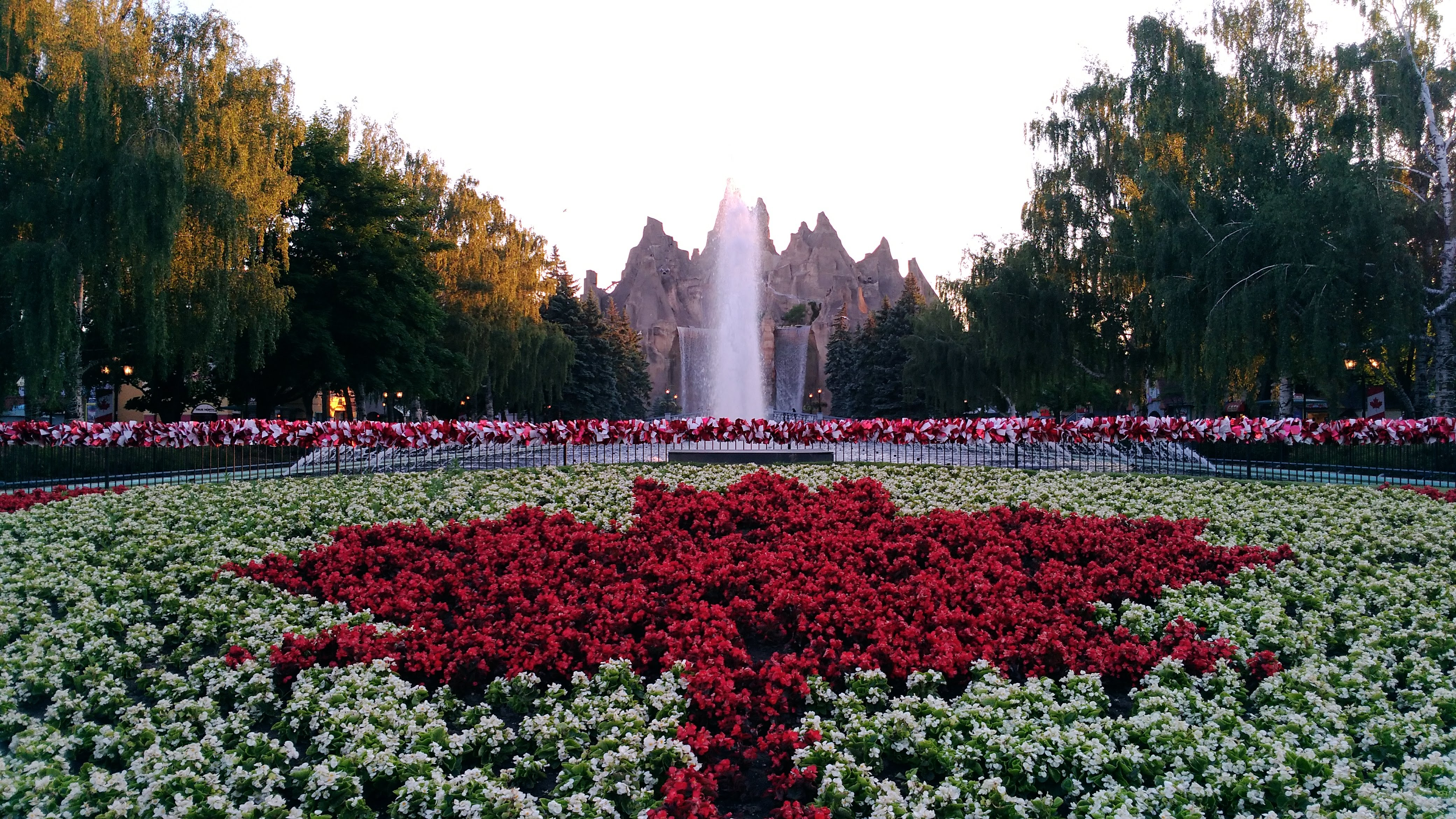
- Wonder Mountain in International Street, the centrepiece of the park
- Interactive map of Canada's Wonderland
- Location: Vaughan, Ontario, Canada
- Coordinates: 43°50′30″N 79°32′35″W
- Opened: 23 May 1981
- Owner: Six Flags
- Former owners: Kings Entertainment Company (1981–1993) Paramount Parks (1993–2006); Cedar Fair (2006–2024)
- Park president: Christopher Mortensen
- Slogan: Four Seasons of Fun for the Whole Family
- Operating season: May – Early January
- Attendance: 3,768,000 (2022)
- Area: 331 acres (134 ha)

Attractions
- Total: 68
- Roller coasters: 18
- Water rides: 2
- Website: sixflags.com/canadaswonderland

Canada's Wonderland is an amusement park in Vaughan, Ontario, a municipality within the Greater Toronto Area (GTA). The 330-acre (130 ha) park features various attractions and rides in several themed areas, as well as a 20-acre (8.1 ha) water park named Splash Works. In 2022, it was the most visited seasonal amusement park in North America, with an estimated 3.8 million guests.

Opened in 1981 by the Taft Broadcasting Company and the Great-West Life Assurance Company, Canada's Wonderland was the first major theme park in Canada and remains the country's largest. In 1993, part-owner Paramount Parks acquired full ownership and renamed the park Paramount Canada's Wonderland. Paramount was dropped from the name in 2007, a season after Paramount Parks was acquired by Cedar Fair. Following the 2024 merger of Cedar Fair and Six Flags, Canada's Wonderland is under the ownership of Six Flags.

Canada's Wonderland operates seasonally from spring through Labour Day in the fall, and then on select dates until early January. Special events are held throughout the season, including Halloween Haunt, WinterFest, and various festivals such as Celebration Canada, a month-long Canada Day festival. Among the park's 68 attractions, it features 18 roller coasters, which is tied for second-most among amusement parks worldwide.

== History ==
=== Proposal ===
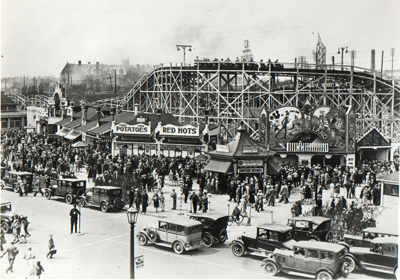
Rides at Sunnyside Amusement Park in 1923. Sunnyside was an early amusement park in Toronto that was demolished in 1955.

When Canada's Wonderland was planned, the Greater Toronto Area lacked a seasonal amusement park that had roller coasters. The city of Toronto had previously hosted three such amusement parks: Sunnyside Amusement Park closed in the 1950s to make room for the Gardiner Expressway. The Scarboro Beach and Hanlan's Point amusement parks both closed in the 1920s.

In 1972, the Taft Broadcasting Company, headed by Kelly Robinson, first proposed building a 330-acre (130 ha) theme park in the then small village of Maple, part of Vaughan, Ontario, located directly north of Toronto. Several other possible locations in Ontario were considered, including Niagara Falls, Cambridge, and Milton, but Maple was finally selected because of its proximity to the City of Toronto and the 400-series of highways.

Others had seriously considered the Greater Toronto Area as a spot to build a theme park, among them the Conklin family (whose Conklin Shows ran various midways around North America, including Toronto's Canadian National Exhibition midway in Exhibition Place). Walt Disney also considered the idea before choosing Florida for the Walt Disney World Resort, rejecting Toronto mainly because of the city's seasonal climate, which would make the operating season too short to be profitable.

Construction of the park was opposed on multiple fronts. Many cultural institutions in Toronto – such as Ontario Place, the Royal Ontario Museum, and the operators of the Canadian National Exhibition – felt that the Toronto market was not large enough to support more competition. Other groups that fought the building of Wonderland included a Vaughan residential association called SAVE, which thought the increased traffic would reduce property values. People in the region were concerned that the new park would be similar in aesthetics to a carnival or midway. Some of the concessions the company made included a landscaped berm around the park to reduce noise and modifying the appearance of the large parking lot. In August 1975, a month after the project was announced, the company chartered a flight that took local officials, who paid their own way, and residents on a tour of its Kings Island park at Mason, Ohio, near Cincinnati, to demonstrate the effect such a park had on the surrounding community. Vaughan mayor Garnet Williams was very impressed at Kings Island during the visit, while councillor Jim Cameron was not as convinced after visiting it.

Canada's Wonderland was also responsible for changing the master development plan for the province of Ontario. The provincial government wanted to increase residential and commercial development to the east of Toronto in the Regional Municipality of Durham, which includes Pickering and Oshawa, while keeping the lands to the north of Toronto agricultural, as a Greenbelt. The Wonderland promoters were able to convince the province to amend the planning policy for the region, and the park secured infrastructure improvements, including a highway overpass and sewage systems, that were expanded and built out to the site. This infrastructure paved the way for increased development throughout the region.

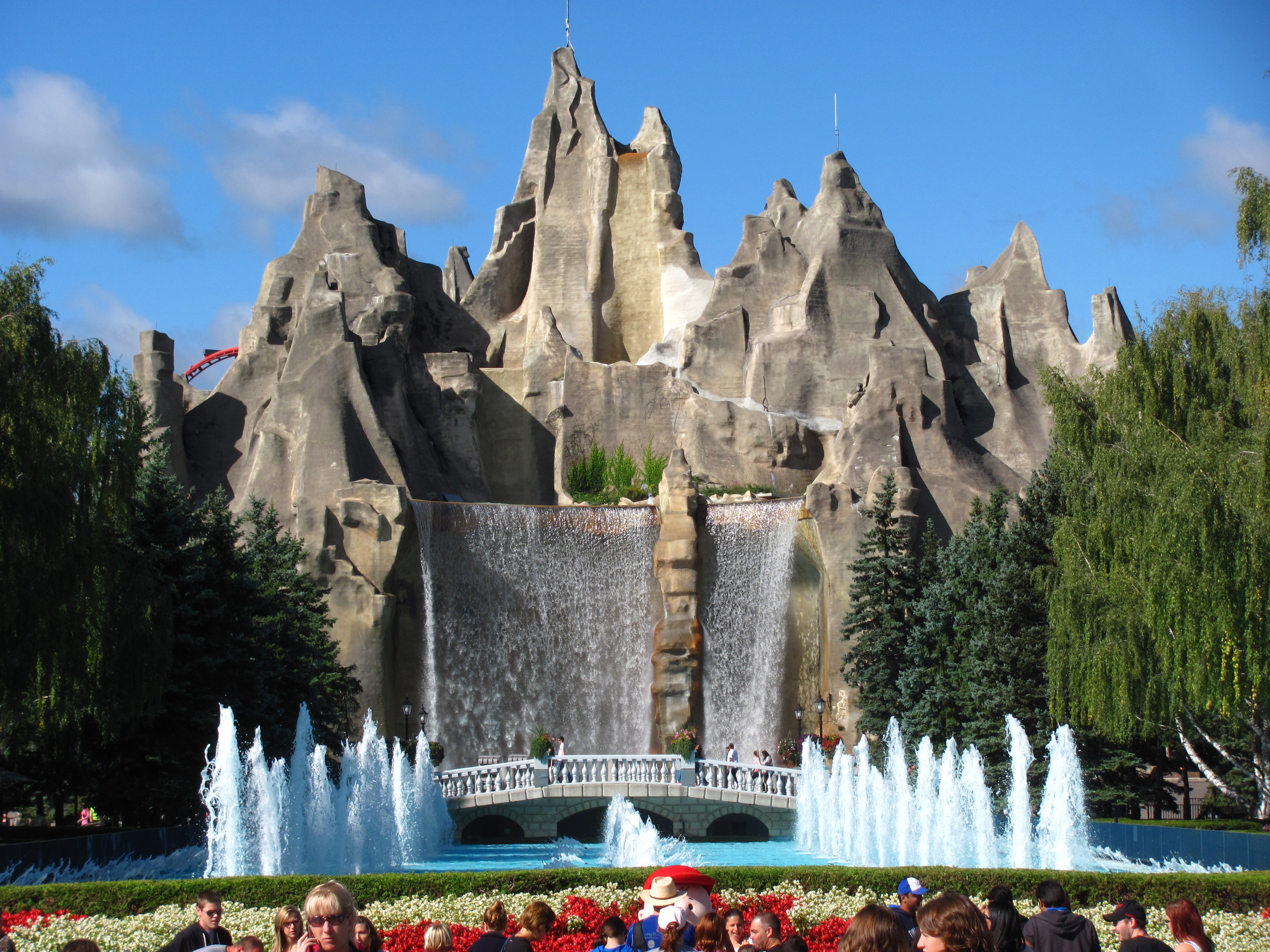
During the park's development, it was decided that Wonder Mountain would serve as its centrepiece, as opposed to the replica Eiffel Towers found in its sister parks Kings Island and Kings Dominion.

Concerns were also raised about the cultural implications of allowing an American theme park to open in Canada. Many felt that it would be a "Trojan Horse" for American culture. To counter the criticism, Taft planned to open Frontier Canada, a part of the park devoted to Canada's history. Early park maps show the area encompassing what is now Splash Works, White Water Canyon, the Action Theatre and the southern part of Kidzville. Taft also proposed including a steam passenger train. While Frontier Canada was not brought up as an idea until 2019 by a different owner, several original themes remain in the area. Unlike its sister parks, Kings Island and Kings Dominion, it was decided early that the centrepiece of the park would not be a replica of Paris's famous Eiffel Tower. Instead, the park's designers chose to build a massive mountain, known as Wonder Mountain, situated at the top of International Street. Wonder Mountain featured a huge waterfall and interior pathways that led visitors to a look-out point. The interior pathways have been closed since and have remained closed. In 2018, the park announced plans to open a Hyatt House and Hyatt Place–branded hotel eventually.

=== Construction and opening ===
On 13 June 1979, Ontario Premier Bill Davis depressed the plunger on an electronic detonating device at St. Lawrence Hall in downtown Toronto, triggering an explosion on the site. Construction began immediately and continued on to early 1981. Canadian companies were partners on the preliminary design and engineering of the project. Construction of the mountain alone involved a dozen local companies under Cincinnati engineer Curtis D. Summers.

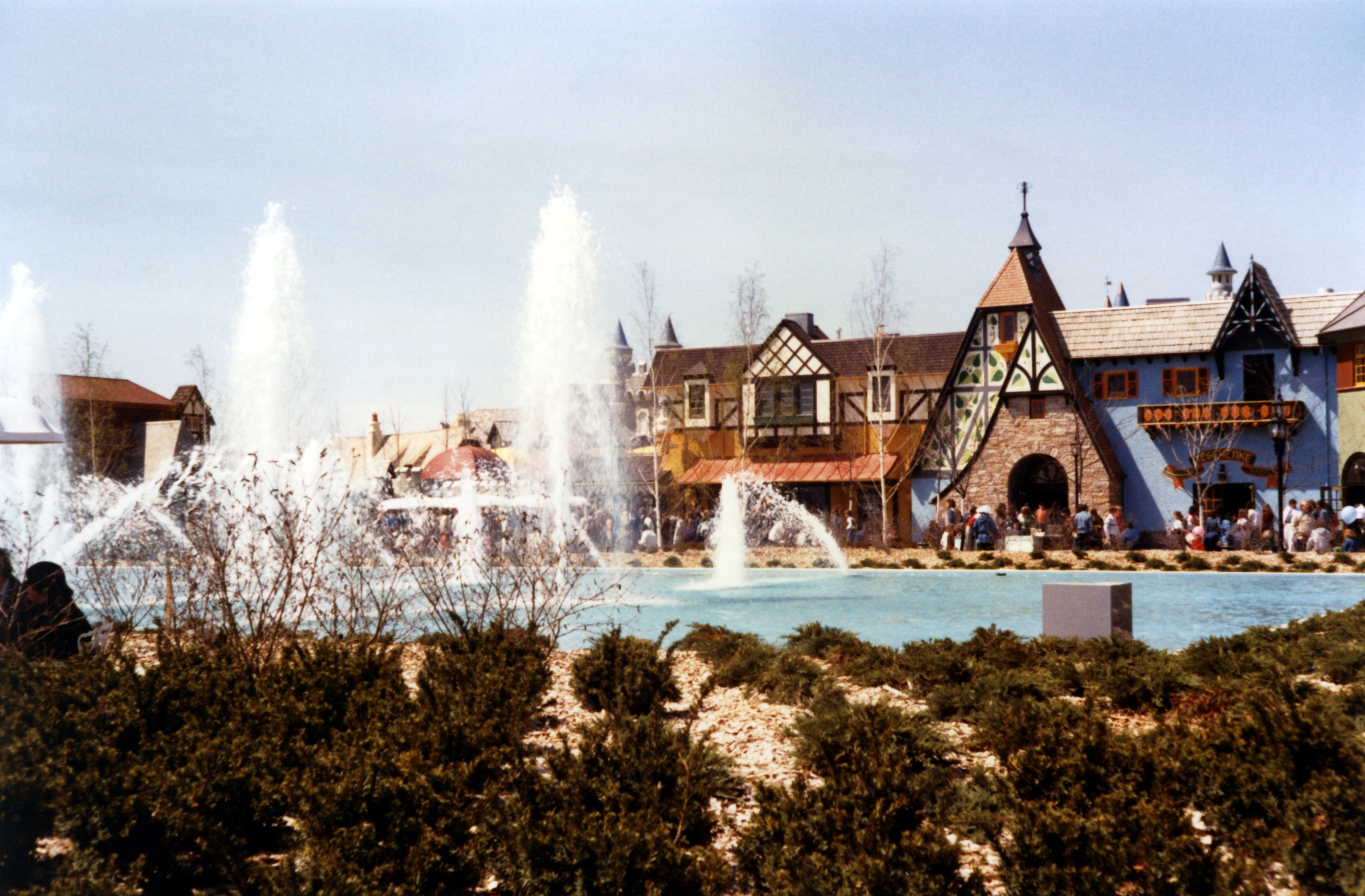
Canada's Wonderland was opened to the public in May 1981.

Two years later on 23 May 1981, Davis and Taft Broadcasting President Dudley S. Taft Sr. officially opened Canada's Wonderland to the public. The spectacular opening ceremony included 10,000 helium balloons, 13 parachutists, 350 white doves, and a pipe band. Four children, representing the Arctic, Pacific, Atlantic, and Great Lakes regions of Canada, each poured a vial of water from their home regions into the park's fountain. Hockey superstar Wayne Gretzky also appeared as a special guest, helping to raise the Canadian flag. 12,000 guests were welcomed into the park for the first time. The park cost $120 million ($398 million in 2025 dollars) to build.

=== Kings Entertainment and Paramount era ===
During the 1980s, Canada's Wonderland and the Loblaws supermarket chain mounted a cross-marketing campaign. Loblaws issued "Wonder dollars" based on customers' purchases, which were redeemable at Canada's Wonderland at par with the Canadian dollar on weekdays. The obverse of the coin featured Wonder Mountain, while the reverse featured the Loblaws logo.

In 1983, Canada's Wonderland added the Kingswood Music Theatre, a 15,000-seat amphitheatre that has hosted many concerts. After the RBC Amphitheatre (then known as Molson Amphitheatre) opened on the grounds of Ontario Place in 1995, cultural festivals at the theatre became less prominent.

Since the closure of Mighty Flyer in Exhibition Place in Toronto in 1992, Canada's Wonderland is the only location in Ontario with wooden roller coasters in operation.

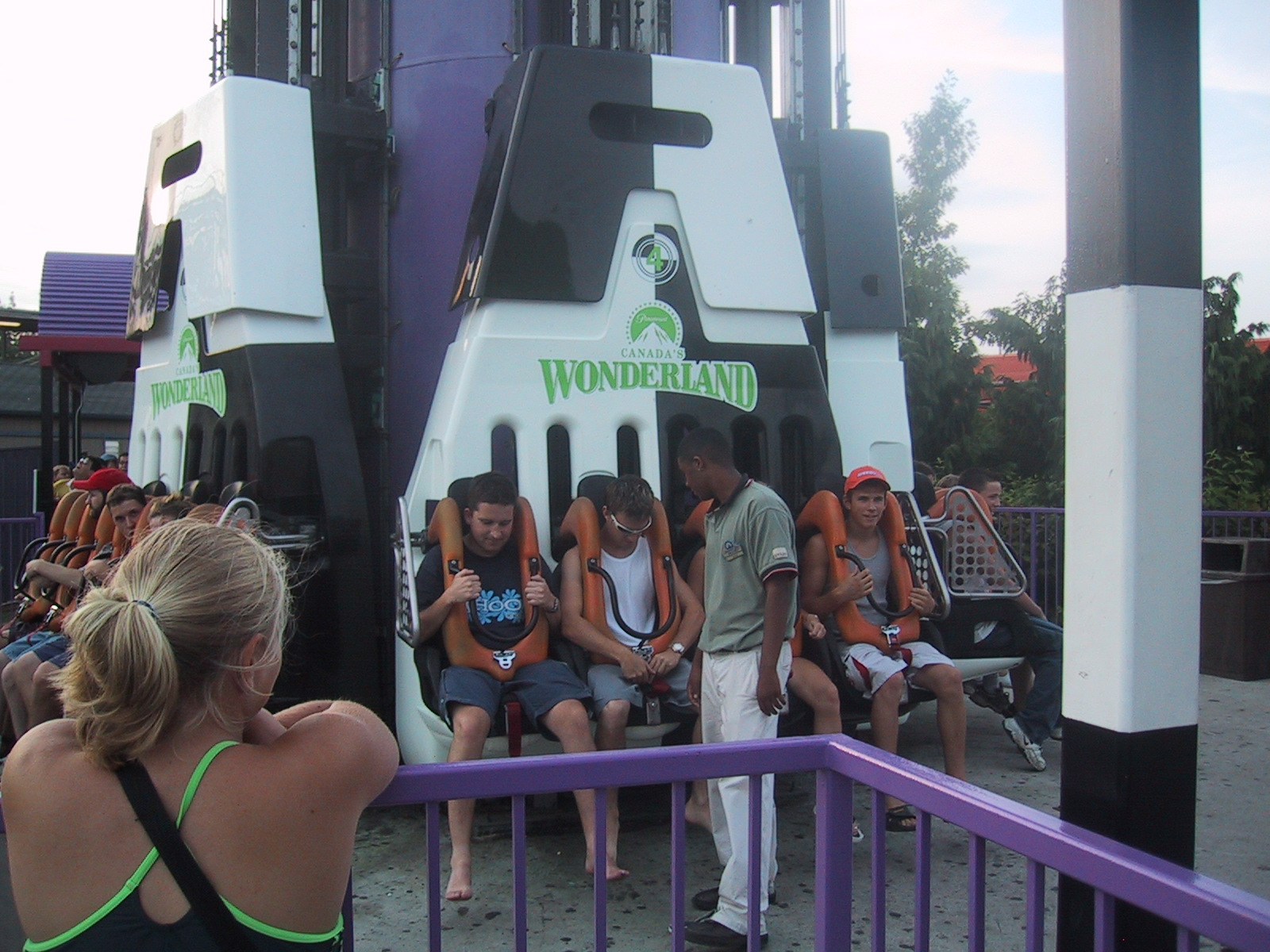
Ride seats for Drop Tower in 2001, then named Drop Zone: Stunt Tower, in reference to the Paramount film of the same name.

Kings Entertainment Company operated the park during the 1980s and early 1990s. The park's former connection to Hanna-Barbera Productions lessened after Paramount Pictures raised its stake from 20 per cent to full ownership of the park in 1993 and renamed it Paramount Canada's Wonderland. After Viacom bought Paramount in 1994, a successful attempt was made to bring families back to the park by attracting children with original Nickelodeon cartoon characters that were familiar to a new generation.

Many changes occurred in the next decade. In 1996, Splash Works expanded, with a new water slide, a wave pool and a new child-friendly water playground (The Black Hole, White Water Bay and The Pump House). In 1998, the park expanded by adding KidZville, which was mainly designed for infants and children. In 1999, Splash Works expanded for the second time, with the addition of raft rides: The Plunge and Super Soaker.

Other changes involved Paramount incorporating references to their film properties into the park. This included the addition of film props around the property, a film-merchandise store, and the renaming of several attractions after Paramount film properties.

In 2001, a new themed area called Zoom Zone was added within the KidZville section. Three new attractions were built in that area: Silver Streak (a family roller coaster), Blast Off (a "frog hopper"), and Jumpin' Jet. In 2002, the park unveiled Action Zone, a new themed area replacing the Exposition of 1890, which at the time contained already existing rides and added the Psyclone ride.

Splash Works also received its third and most current upgrade, with the addition of a child water playground area called Splash Island and the removal of Pipeline.

On 11 May 2003, with the park packed with people for Mother's Day, two guests were involved in a fight at the front gates of the park, which led to a shooting death. It was thought to have followed a prior dispute involving the two over a drug exchange, according to York Regional Police. The park has since added metal detectors at the front gate, with additional security, but not as a direct result of this event.

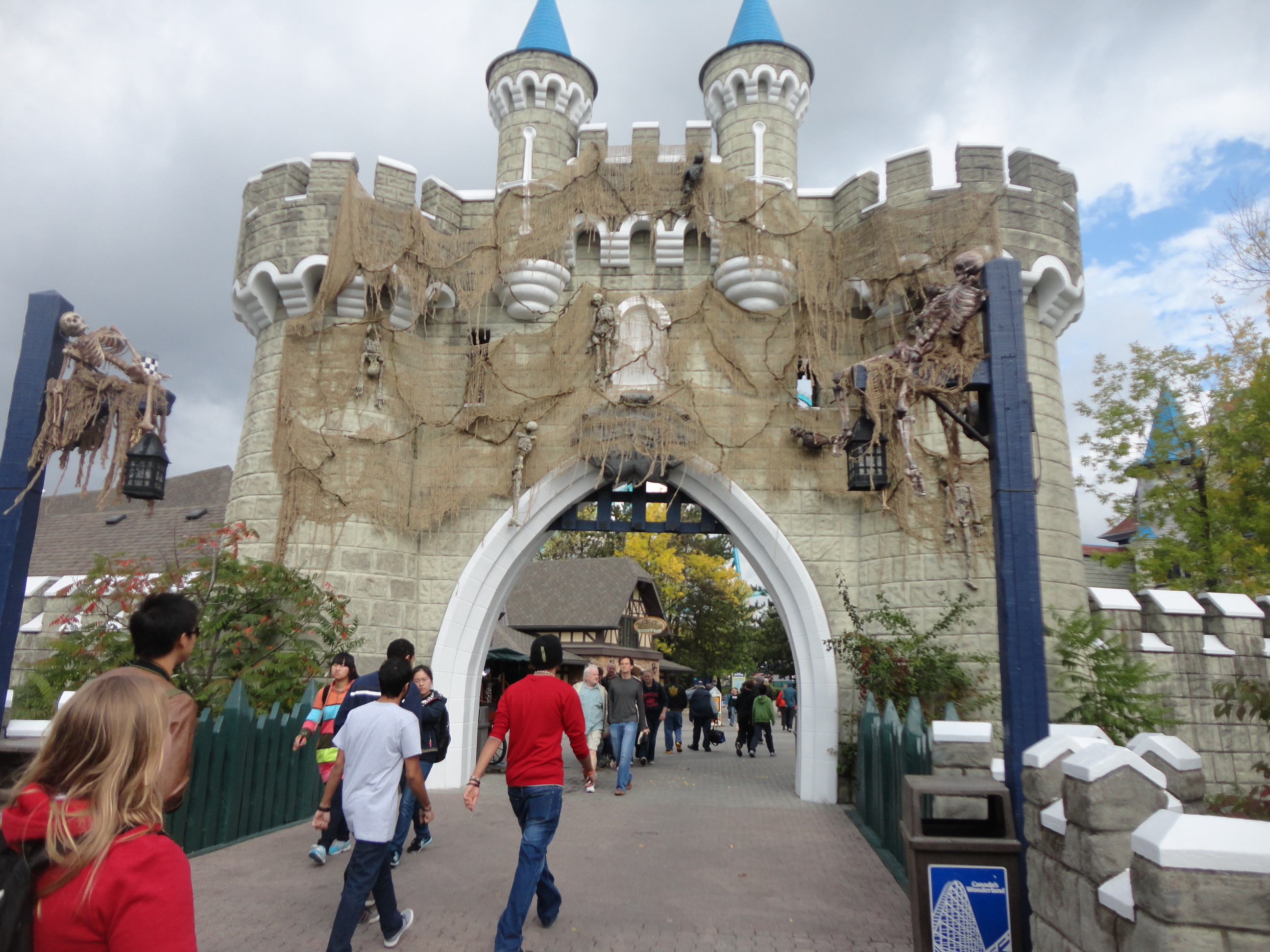
In 2005, the park introduced Fearfest, a Halloween-themed event featuring haunted house attractions.

In 2005, the park introduced Fearfest, a Halloween event featuring various haunted house attractions in different themed areas. Though the section for smaller children was closed off, the park continued running many of the thrill rides during the event, such as the Thunder Run, in which patrons ride a mining type train through a mountain. During the Halloween season, it is re-themed as the "Haunted" Thunder Run, with a darker tunnel and more strobe lights, fog machines, and black-light lit scenes featuring the "skeletons" of miners.

In 2006, the park introduced Spooktacular, a child-oriented Halloween event. The event included children's rides, costume contests and a treasure hunt. Spooktacular was open on weekends during the daytime, while Fearfest remained open at night. Fearfest was renamed Halloween Haunt and Spooktacular was renamed Camp Spooky.

=== Cedar Fair era ===
On 14 May 2006, Cedar Fair announced it was interested in acquiring the five Paramount theme parks from CBS Corporation (successor of the original Viacom), including Canada's Wonderland. CBS stated that amusement parks did not fit the company's new strategy. The acquisition was completed on 30 June 2006.

After the sale, Cedar Fair began to drop the name "Paramount" from all of the former Paramount properties it acquired, as a result, the park reverted to its original name of Canada's Wonderland in January 2007. The 2007 season was a transition year throughout the park and included renaming the movie-themed rides since Cedar Fair did not hold the rights to Paramount film properties. By the start of the 2008 season, all Paramount logos and similar references had been removed. In August 2007, Cedar Fair announced that Fearfest would become Halloween Haunt to remain consistent with most other Cedar Fair parks, and that Spooktacular would become Camp Spooky. The park extended its regular operating season until the last weekend in October. Halloween Haunt runs in the late evenings on October weekends.

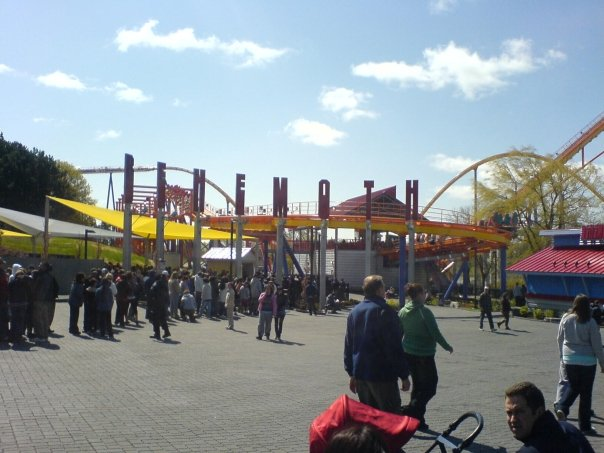
Lines to Behemoth during the ride's opening day on May 4, 2008

On 4 May 2008, Canada's Wonderland opened a Bolliger & Mabillard hypercoaster called Behemoth, which held the record for the tallest and fastest roller coaster in Canada at the time of its opening, standing at 230 feet (70 m) and reaching speeds of 124 kilometres per hour (77 mph).

On 19 July 2009, stunt performer Nik Wallenda walked on a tight rope from the pond area of Medieval Faire to Wonder Mountain.

For the 2010 season, Planet Snoopy opened to the public, which was a retheme of both "The Happy Land of Hanna-Barbera" & "Nickelodeon Central" areas of the park to align Canada's Wonderland with the rest of the Cedar Fair chain. The area consisted of a retheme of all of the rides and facilities of both areas into one cohesive section themed to the Peanuts comics (both Ghoster Coaster & Swan Lake remained unchanged following the change), along with the addition of three new rides for children and families from Zamperla; Lucy's Tugboat, Peanuts 500, and Snoopy's Revolution.

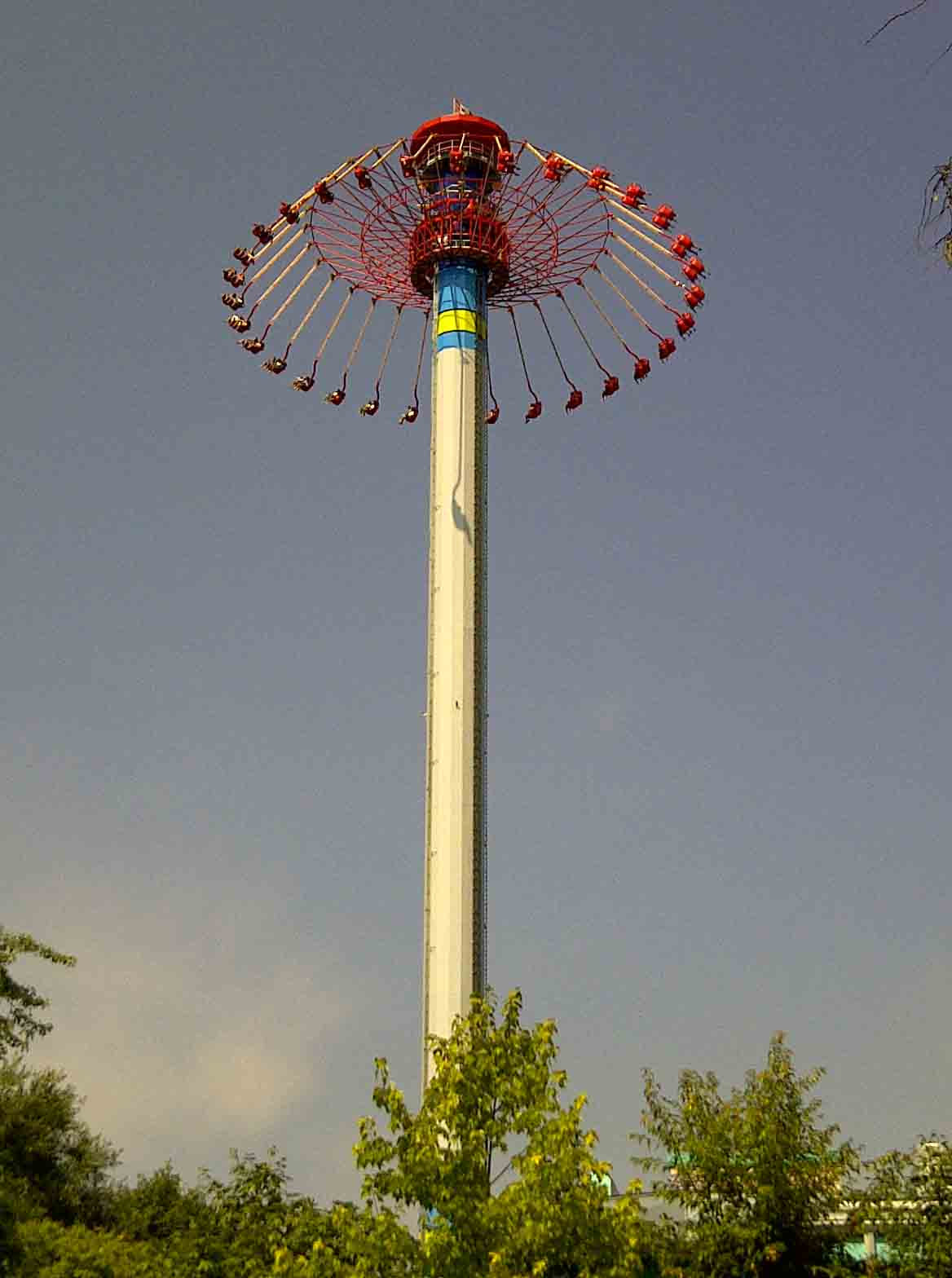
Canada's Wonderland's WindSeeker during the ride's opening season in 2011

In 2011, Canada's Wonderland opened WindSeeker, a 301-foot-tall (92 m) tower-swing ride, making it the tallest ride in the park until Leviathan opened in 2012. The park also announced the addition of the Starlight Spectacular show, which started on 25 June 2011 and ended on Labour Day, 3 September 2011. It was a nightly 'light and sound show' designed to celebrate the park's 30th anniversary; it was shown at 10 pm EST every night on International Street. Canada's Wonderland stated that the total cost for the show was approximately $1 million, with 16 million different colours and 300,000 LED lights. While the show took place at the front of the park (International Street), the highlight was on Wonder Mountain, with many 3D images and colours.

In 2012, Leviathan, a Bolliger & Mabillard Hypercoaster (also classified as a giga coaster), opened, surpassing the Canadian records set by Behemoth in 2008, becoming the tallest and fastest roller coaster in Canada. Norm Pirtovshek, general manager of Canada's Wonderland, said that the Leviathan as a new attraction would help to spread out visitors. It was also described as part of a "roller coaster renaissance" where theme parks distinguished itself by introducing bigger and faster rides to attract guests. In addition to Leviathan, Canada's Wonderland also opened the Dinosaurs Alive! walk-through dinosaur exhibit, which was located in Planet Snoopy.

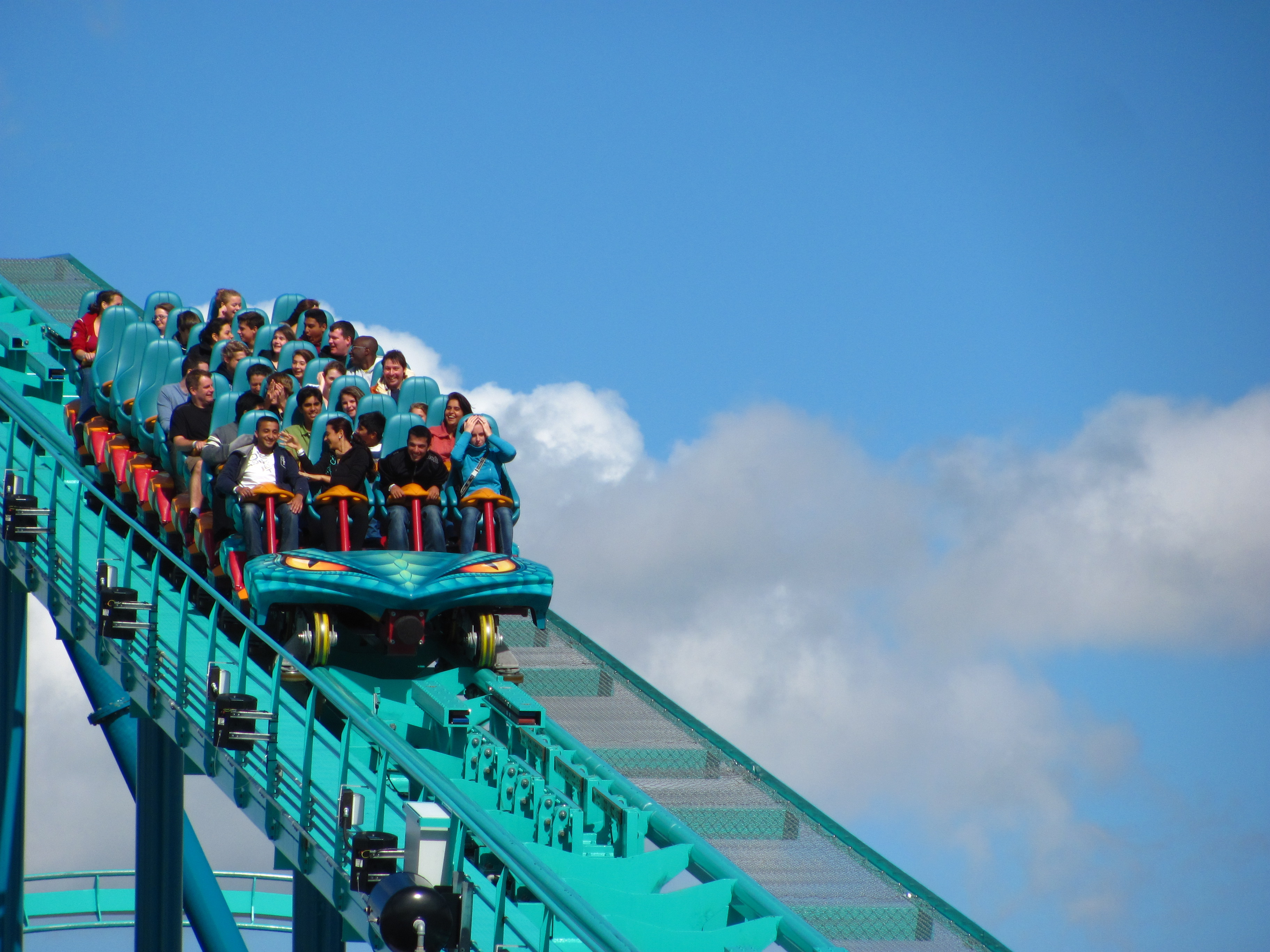
Leviathan during its opening season in 2012

On 27 May 2012, for the first time in the park's history, Canada's Wonderland in partnership with the Ahmadiyya Muslim Youth Association hosted the Run For Vaughan, a one-kilometre, 5-kilometre, and 10-kilometre run to raise money for the planned Cortellucci Vaughan Hospital (then known as Mackenzie Vaughan Hospital) that would be built on land once owned by Canada's Wonderland north of Major Mackenzie Drive.

On 30 August 2013, Canada's Wonderland announced that Wonder Mountain's Guardian would open inside Wonder Mountain in May 2014. The attraction is a 4-D interactive dark ride/ roller coaster with animations from Montreal-based Triotech. Park management also announced that SkyRider would close Labour Day, 2014.

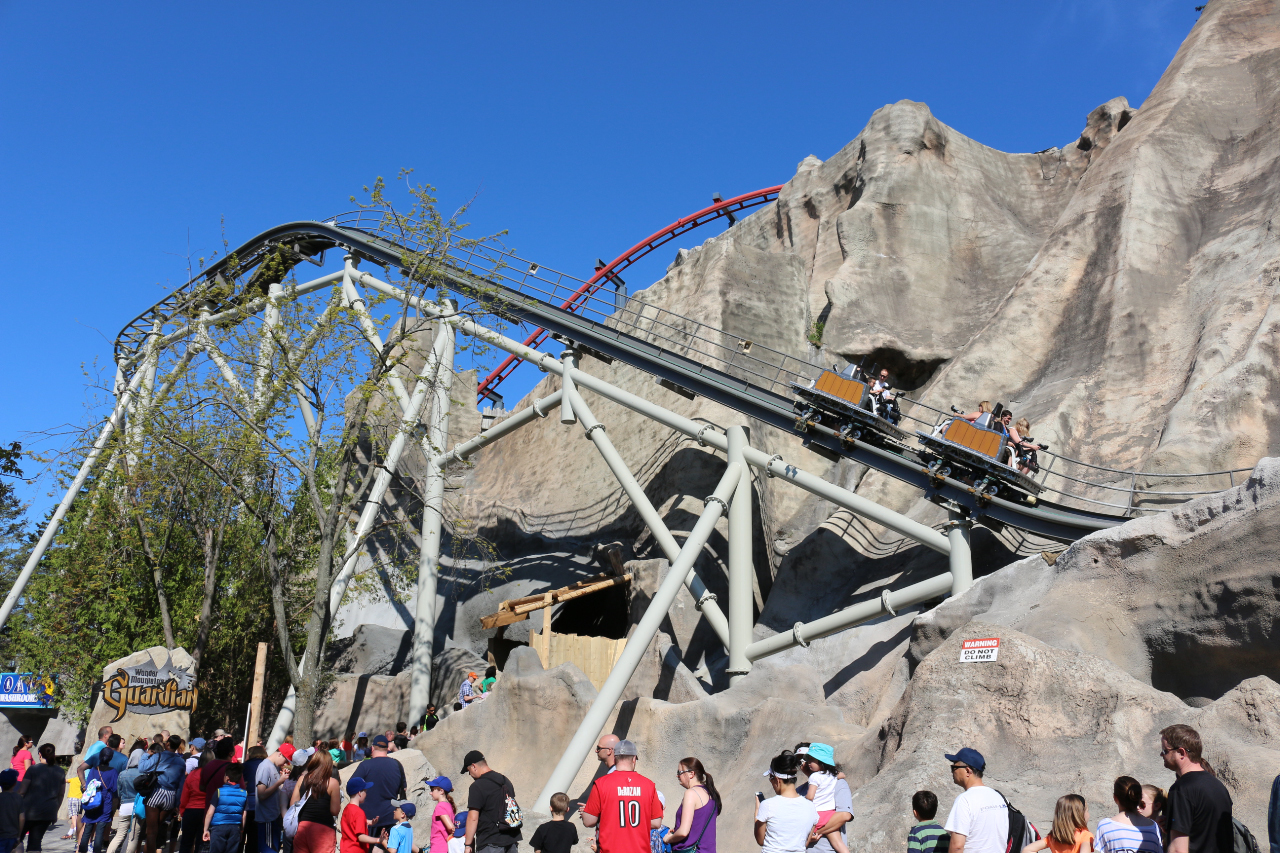
Wonder Mountain's Guardian in 2014, a year after it opened at the park

In October 2014, a man was fatally stabbed at Halloween Haunt. SkyRider was removed at the end of the 2014 season and relocated to Cavallino Matto in Tuscany, Italy, as Freestyle in 2015.

For the 2015 season, Splash Works opened two new attractions, which marked the first expansion to the waterpark since 2002. Both attractions were relocated from Ontario Place, however they never opened in their original locations and were sent to Splash Works. Typhoon is a set of two partially enclosed tube slides with funnels, and was formerly known as Topsy Turvy. Splash Station is an interactive children's play structure similar to the adjacent Pump House, featuring two slides, numerous water features, and a tipping bucket. Though not announced prior to its opening, SlingShot also for the 2015 season in the dry park. This upcharge attraction catapults riders nearly 300 ft (91.5m)in the air, and reaches speeds approaching 100 km/h (60 mph).

Near the close of the 2015 season, Canada's Wonderland announced that two new flat rides would be added in 2016: Skyhawk (a Gerstlauer Sky Roller) and Flying Eagles (a Larson International Flying Scooters). Cedar Fair CEO Matt Ouimett also confirmed in December 2015 that virtual reality (VR) headsets would be added to Thunder Run in 2016. Available to riders for an additional upcharge fee, the experience is co-developed with Mack Rides, a German amusement ride company. The VR headgear is a type of head-mounted display that animates the entire field of vision to produce a 360-degree 3D experience.

On 26 August 2016, Canada's Wonderland announced that a new flat ride would be added in the 2017 season: Soaring Timbers (a Mondial Inferno). The ride is stated to be the first of its kind in North America. The park also announced a Splash Works expansion for 2017 in the form of Muskoka Plunge, a 59-foot (20 m) tall waterslide complex featuring four "trap-door" speed slides. The slides replaced Body Blast.

On 16 August 2017, Canada's Wonderland announced the addition of Flying Canoes for the 2018 season. Flying Canoes is an interactive family ride that allows riders to control their journey of flight in two-person canoes that rotate speedily around a circuit. They also announced the addition of Lumberjack for 2018. Made by Italian manufacturer Zamperla, Lumberjack is a thrill ride that takes guests to heights of 75 feet (23 m) on two swinging axe-themed pendulums, propelling them into a looping 360-degree experience. In addition to these two attractions, the park announced an expansion to the Splash Island pool (located in Splash Works), which doubled the size of the pool and included new interactive water features and children's slides, along with shaded seating areas for families to relax. The area was renamed to Lakeside Lagoon following these upgrades.

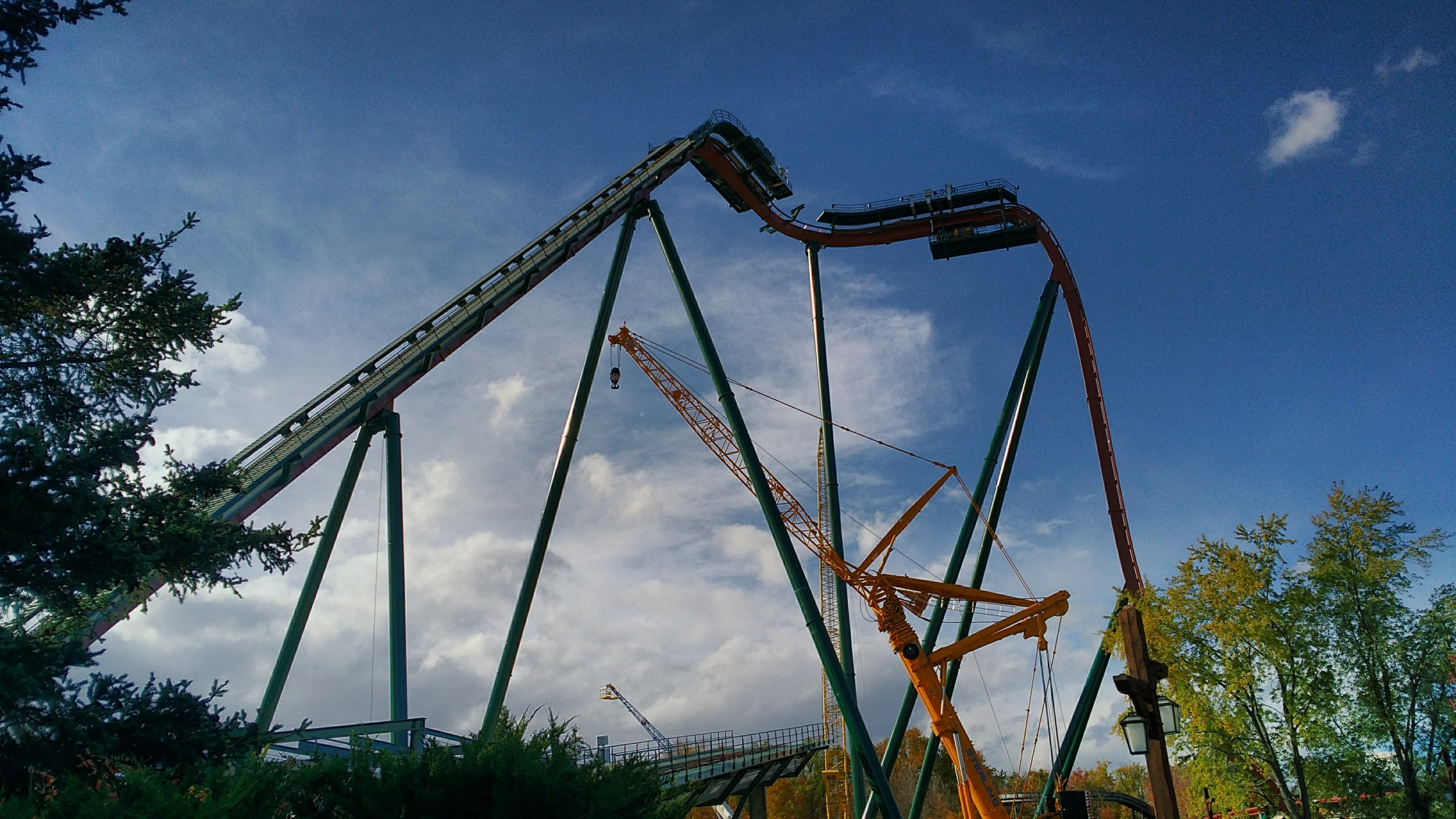
Yukon Striker under construction in October 2018

On 15 August 2018, Canada's Wonderland announced Yukon Striker, a B&M Dive Coaster which opened to the public on 3 May 2019. The ride features a 245-foot-tall (75 m) drop into an underwater tunnel in the centre of the Vortex helix, which has a top speed of 130 km/h. Upon opening, the ride became the tallest, fastest, and longest dive coaster in the world and features four inversions, more than any other dive coaster, including the first vertical loop on a Dive Coaster. They also announced the opening of Frontier Canada, a gold-rush-themed attraction area that includes Yukon Striker, Mighty Canadian Minebuster, Lumberjack, Soaring Timbers, Flying Canoes, Vortex, Timberwolf Falls and White Water Canyon. Canada's Wonderland also announced Winterfest, an immersive holiday-themed event. In addition, the park announced that Dinosaurs Alive! would be closing on 28 October 2018. The attraction's former gift shop is still used seasonally for WinterFest.

On 4 February 2019, the park announced that Orbiter would not be opening for the 2019 season. Since the announcement, the attraction has been removed from the park and the area surrounding it was replaced with a pathway connecting Action Zone and Frontier Canada.

On 14 August 2019, Canada's Wonderland announced the addition of two new attractions for the 2020 season. The first, Beagle Brigade Airfield, is a new children's ride located in Planet Snoopy. The attraction is mostly identical to the version at sister park Worlds of Fun in Kansas City, Missouri, which share the same name, but Wonderland's version is partially covered. In addition, the park announced Mountain Bay Cliffs for Splash Works, which is a cliff-jumping style attraction featuring multiple platforms of varying heights, the highest of which is 25 feet (7.6 m). Both of these attractions opened in 2021.

On 22 November 2019, WinterFest debuted at Canada's Wonderland. WinterFest is a holiday event. During WinterFest, five million energy-efficient LED lights were strung on 800 trees, the buildings, the décor, and on Wonder Mountain. On International Street, the lake had been frozen into a skating rink called Snow Flake Lake. There were eight themed areas.

==== COVID-19 pandemic ====
Restrictions placed by the Government of Ontario to combat the COVID-19 pandemic resulted in the park remaining closed for the 2020 season. This also led to the cancellations of that season's Halloween Haunt and Winterfest events. Canada's Wonderland posted a series of four horror vignettes 30 October 2020 titled Nighttime Walk to celebrate Haunt featuring the empty park. The park attempted to reopen in May 2021, but it was postponed to July 5 of the same year. An online reservation system was required for guests to book the date and time of their visit during the shortened 2021 season. As a result, 2020 and 2021 season passes were extended to partially include the 2022 season and refunds were not officially offered. Both Beagle Brigade Airfield and Mountain Bay Cliffs had their opening years pushed back to the 2021 season.

Also due to the pandemic, the 2020 and 2021 editions of Toronto's original Santa Claus Parade – normally held on the streets in Downtown Toronto in previous years – was pre-recorded from Canada's Wonderland with no spectators on site and was broadcast on Eastern Standard Time's prime time on 5 December 2020 and 4 December 2021, respectively. From 29 March 2021 until summer 2021, Canada's Wonderland served as a drive-in mass COVID-19 vaccination site.

==== Additions in the 2020s ====
On 16 June 2022, Canada's Wonderland announced Lazy Bear Lodge (marketed as Lazy Bear Lodge: Wood Fire Grille), which became the park's largest dining facility to date. The restaurant is located on the hillside beside Vortex's first drop, overlooking Yukon Striker and the rest of Frontier Canada, and features seating for over 500 guests, an indoor and outdoor bar, two floors, a multi-level outdoor patio, and numerous fire pits for guests to relax by. The menu is a Canadian-inspired rustic-grill BBQ, featuring local ingredients and two meat smokers. In addition, the menu is rotational, changing for each major season. The restaurant opened to the public on 17 September 2022, with the indoor bar opening a week prior.

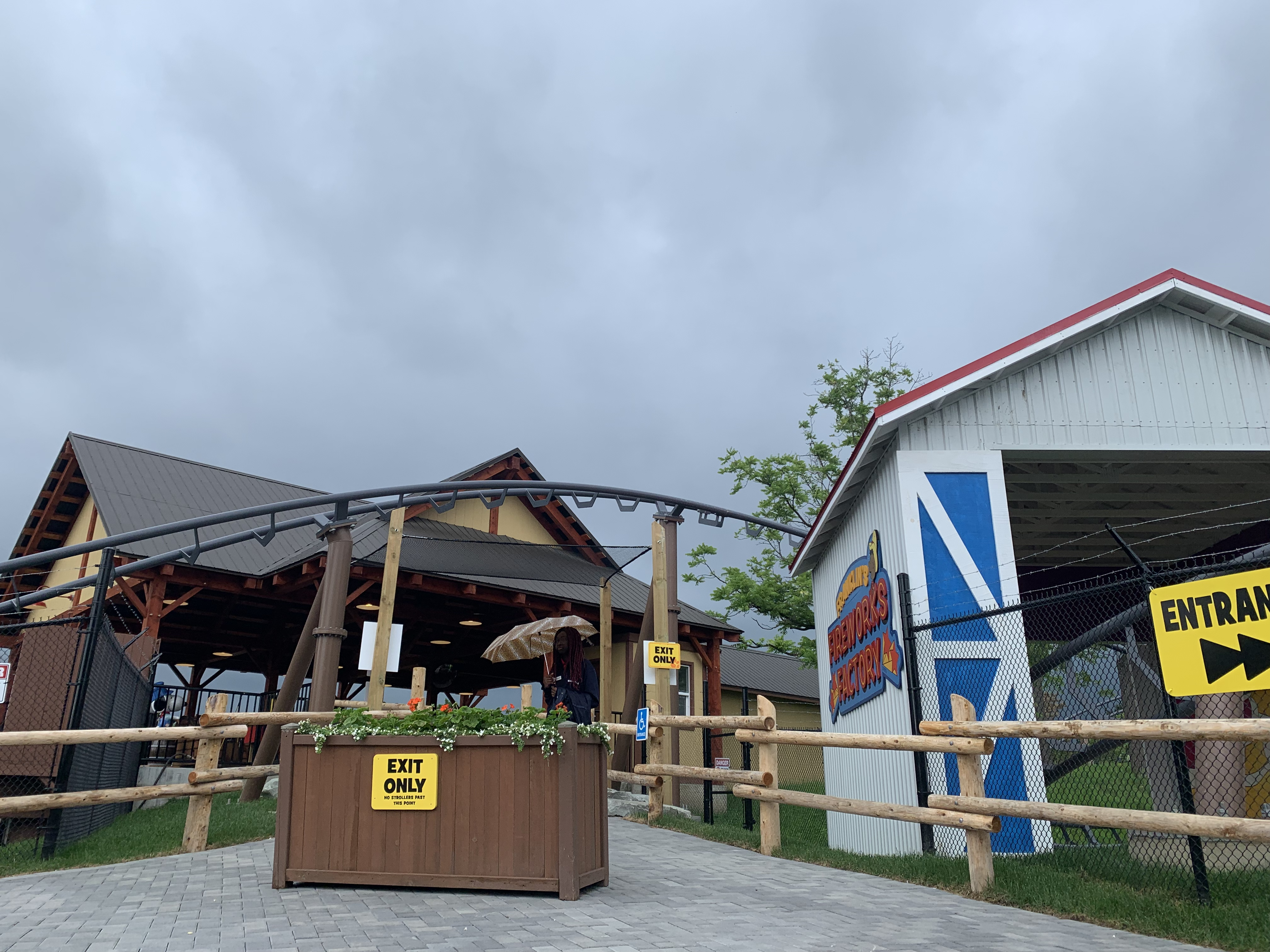
View of exit at Snoopy's Racing Railway (2023)

On 11 August 2022, Canada's Wonderland announced two new attractions for the 2023 season. The first, Tundra Twister, is a first-of-its-kind flat ride from Mondial that is located in Frontier Canada next to Yukon Striker's zero-g winder inversion, creating many near-misses with the coaster. The ride features rotating gondola arms that freely rotate, while the ride's base spins 360 degrees at heights of 154 feet (47 m) and speeds of 75 kilometres per hour (47 mph). The second was Snoopy's Racing Railway, a family launch coaster manufactured by ART Engineering and the park's 18th roller coaster overall. Snoopy's Racing Railway is located in Planet Snoopy and takes up a portion of the land that was previously occupied by Dinosaurs Alive!. The coaster opened to the public on 18 May 2023, and Tundra Twister opened to the public a few weeks later on 3 June 2023.

On 10 August 2023, the park announced Moosehorn Falls, a new waterslide for Splash Works for the 2024 season. The slide features six-person rafts travelling down a course of small drops and turns before plummeting down a large drop into a 42-foot (13 m) wall, leading into the final splash pool. The name "Moosehorn Falls" is inspired by waterfalls on the Moosehorn Trail in the Fundy National Park in New Brunswick. The trail and park is located within the UNESCO-designated Fundy Biosphere Region. The attraction was planned to open in June 2024, but was delayed until August.

On 8 February 2024, Canada's Wonderland announced that Xtreme Skyflyer would permanently shut down for the 2024 season after 26 years of operating. The attraction gave over 1.17 million rides prior to its removal. This closure was cited for future expansion and development by the park.

=== Six Flags era ===
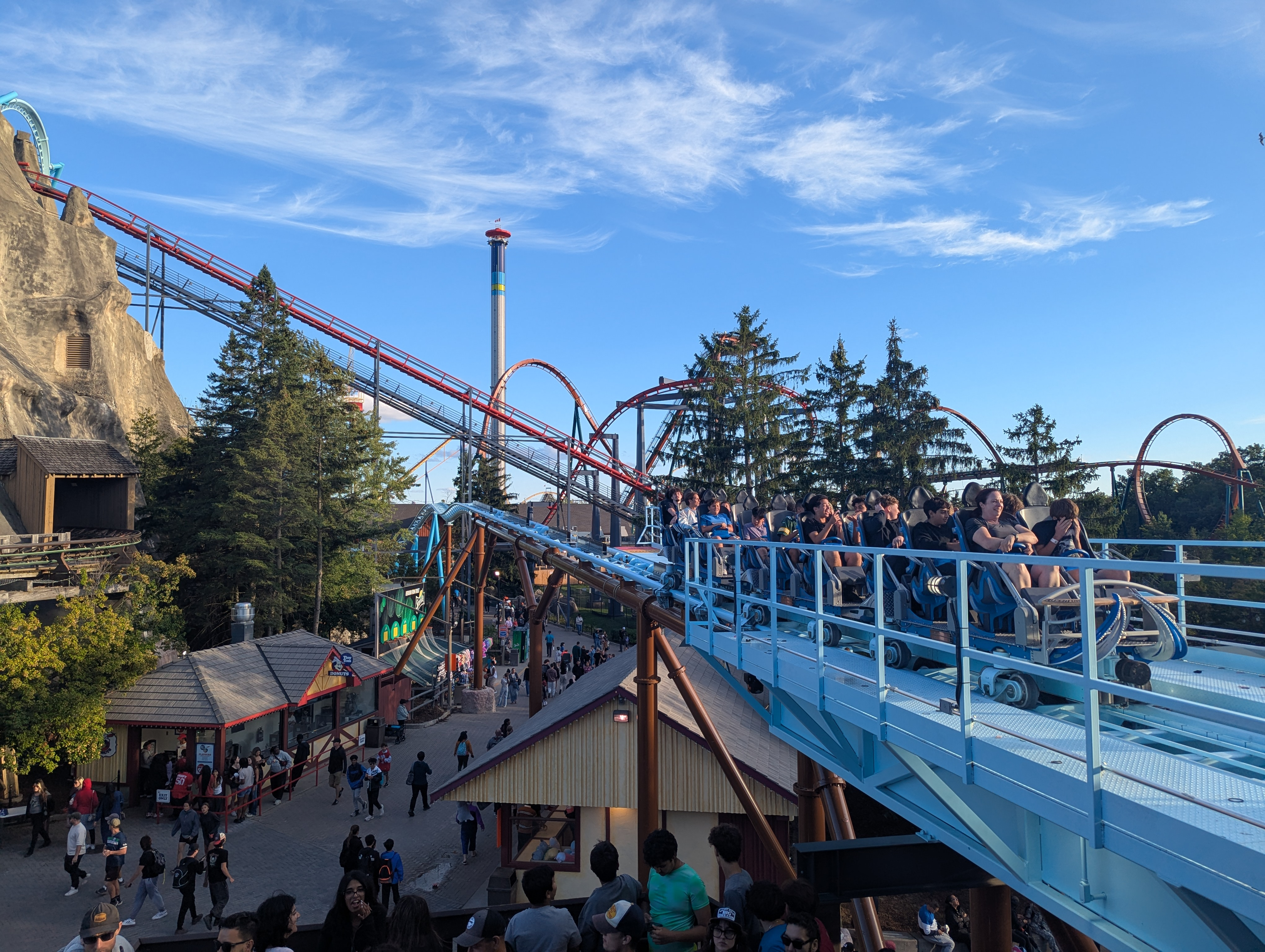
A returning train on AlpenFury

On 1 July 2024, Cedar Fair merged with Six Flags, and the combined Six Flags Entertainment Corporation took over Canada's Wonderland.

On 8 August 2024, the park announced the construction of a Premier Rides launched coaster for the 2025 season known as AlpenFury. The ride is 1,000 metres (3,300 feet) in length and feature a 50-metre (160-foot) launch out of Wonder Mountain at 115 kilometres per hour (71 mph) along with nine inversions, setting a record for inversions on a launched roller coaster in North America. Concurrent with AlpenFury's addition, the International Festival section of the park was renamed and re-themed to Alpenfest to match the new ride. The roller coaster opened to guests on 12 July 2025.

Time Warp closed permanently at the end of the 2024 season, with official confirmation on 13 March 2025 and subsequent removal.

Beginning in the 2026 season, Flight Deck was renamed The DareDeviler. The coaster also received second-generation trains from Professor Screamore's SkyWinder at sister park Six Flags America in Woodmore, Maryland near Washington, DC as that park closed permanently at the end of the previous season and SkyWinder is also a Vekoma Suspended Looping Coaster (SLC).

== Grounds ==
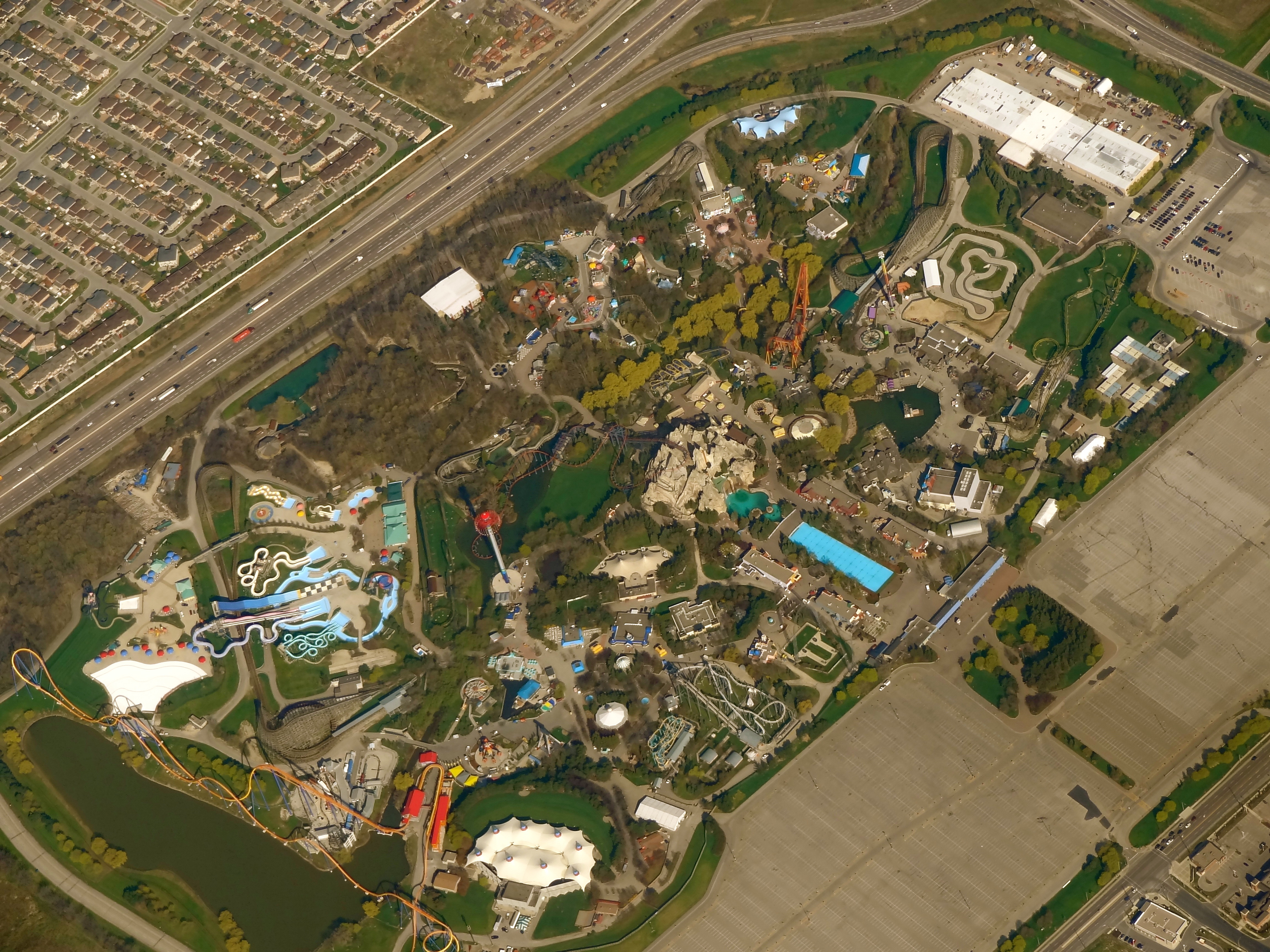
Aerial view of the park in 2011, which shows surrounding roadways

Canada's Wonderland is located in Maple, a neighbourhood of Greater Toronto's suburb, Vaughan. The park is east of Highway 400 between Rutherford Road (Exit 33) and Major Mackenzie Drive (Exit 35), 13 kilometres (8.1 mi) north of Highway 401, 6 kilometres (3.7 mi) north of Highway 407, and 64 kilometres (40 mi) south of Barrie. It is bounded by Highway 400 to the west, Jane Street to the east, Major Mackenzie Drive to the north, and an access road approximately 1 kilometre (0.62 mi) north of Rutherford Road to the south. When the park originally opened, its surroundings were largely rural; however, the suburban sprawl since the mid-2000s has resulted in it being surrounded by housing and shopping plazas on all sides.

The park is located 1.5 kilometres (0.93 mi) north of the Vaughan Mills shopping centre and 5.5 kilometres (3.4 mi) north of the Toronto subway's Vaughan Metropolitan Centre station. The park is also south of the Cortellucci Vaughan Hospital, and is immediately north of Toronto. On the north side of the park is Major Mackenzie West Terminal, which serves bus routes operated by York Region Transit. Prior to the opening of the subway station in December 2017, it was served by the 165 Weston Road North bus of the Toronto Transit Commission bus system operating from York Mills station via Wilson station. The park has two public entrances and one entrance for staff, deliveries, and buses.

The park encompasses eight themed areas on 134 hectares (330 acres) of land, with an artificial mountain as the central feature. In the southwestern quadrant, an 20-acre (8 ha) waterpark is called Splash Works.

=== Areas ===
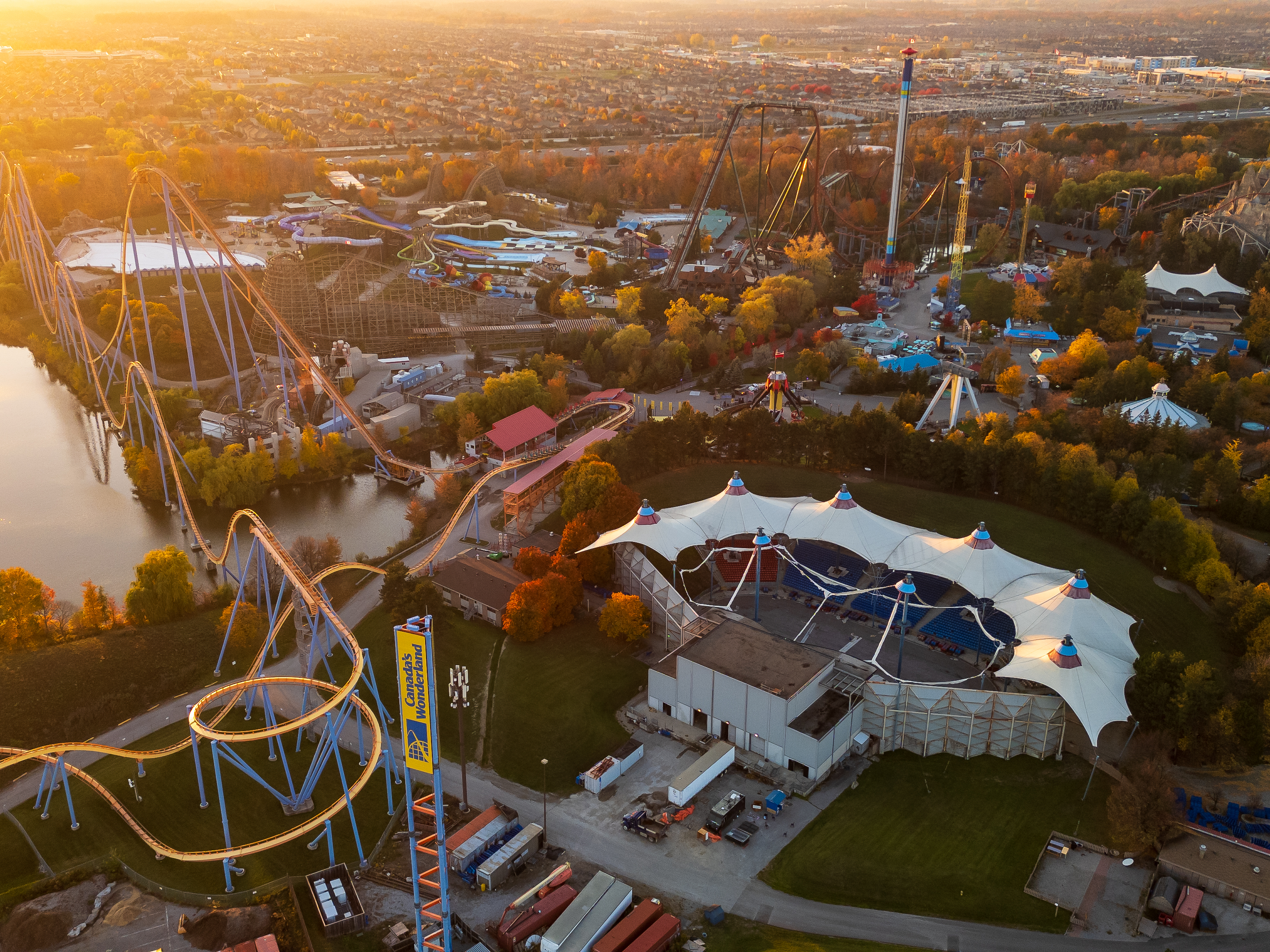
Aerial view of the park from the southeast. Action Zone, Grande World Expo, and Splash Works are visible in the background.

The park has several themed areas. The five original sections include International Street, Medieval Faire, Grande World Exposition of 1890 (renamed Action Zone; Grande World Exposition of 1890 returned in 2019 by renaming a portion of Action Zone), Alpenfest, and the Happyland of Hanna-Barbera (divided into more than one children's area since 1998). The current areas include the original sections stated above, Splash Works (1992), Action Zone (2002), and two children's areas: Kidzville (1998), and Planet Snoopy (2010). In 2019, the park introduced a new themed area, "Frontier Canada", a gold-rush-themed section originally planned for the park's original opening in 1981, but was postponed until 2019 due to financial issues.

==== Action Zone ====
Action Zone was created as a subsection within the Grande World Exposition of 1890 section of the park in 2002. However, the entire Grande Exposition section was renamed Action Zone in 2009. In 2019, the park split Action Zone into two sections, with its eastern portion of Action Zone reverting its theme and name to The Grande Exposition of 1890.

==== Alpenfest ====
Alpenfest is located in the northeast section of the park. It includes rides, midway games and a mild Alpen theme, which was expanded in 2025 upon the opening of AlpenFury.

==== Frontier Canada ====
Frontier Canada is the newest themed section of the park, debuting for the 2019 season. The section consolidates most of the park's Canadian themed rides; as well as an area of the park formerly known as White Water Canyon, which operated from 1984 to 2018. The area is themed after a boom town found during the time of the Klondike Gold Rush, with most of its inspiration coming from Dawson City, Yukon, and its surrounding area.

==== Grande World Expo ====
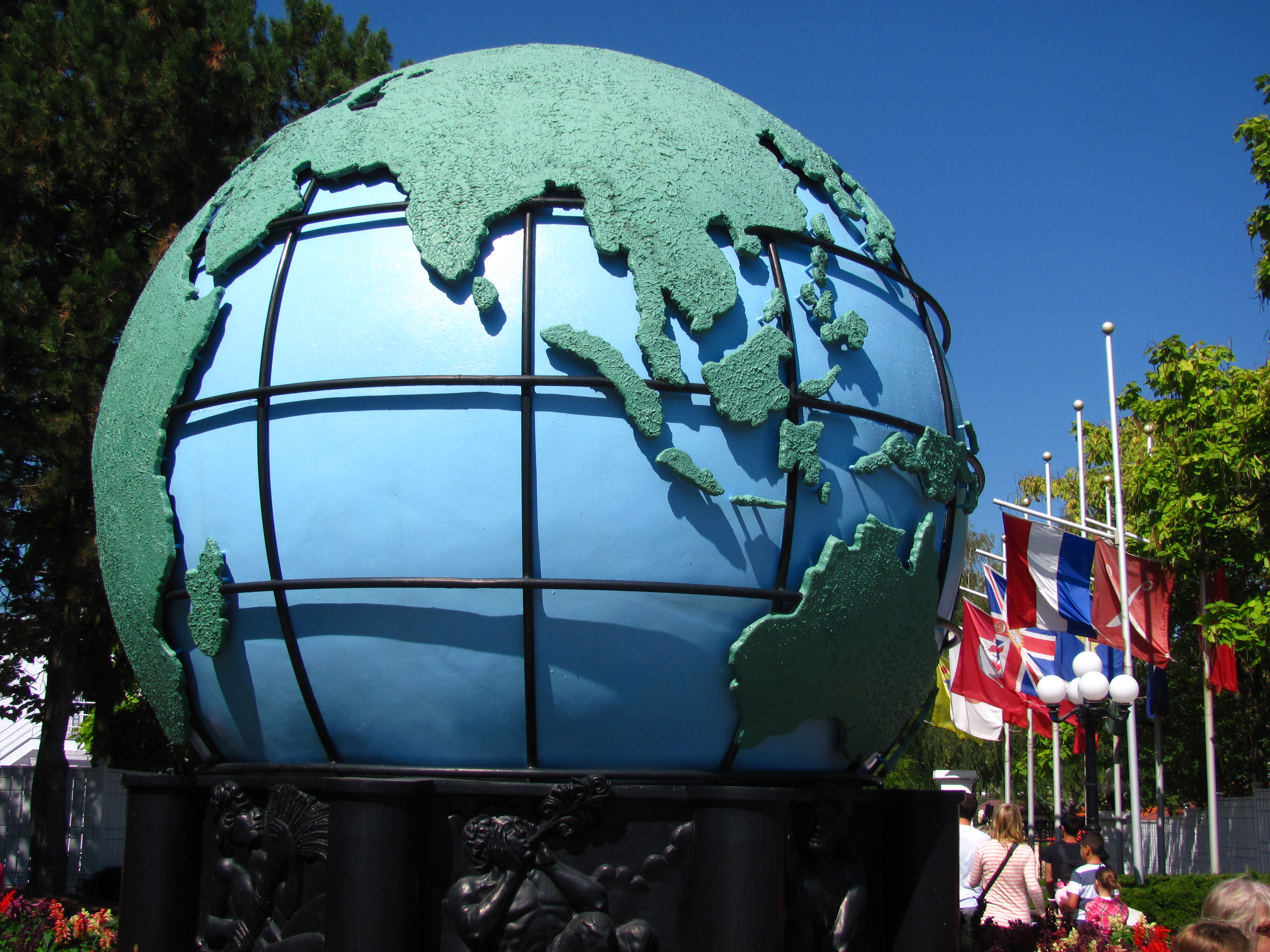
Grande World Expo is themed to resemble a 19th-century world's fair.

The Grande World Exposition of 1890 is one of the original four themed areas of Wonderland. It was made to resemble a late 19th century world's fair with expositions from different countries with a particular focus on African and Asian themes. The restaurants and washrooms were formerly true to the exposition theme. One of the restaurants was called Ginza Gardens (now Grande World Eatery) and had a Japanese theme and a Japanese façade. There is also an arcade area (Crystal Palace Arcade) within this section of the park.

In 2009, the entire Grande Exposition section was incorporated in Action Zone, an area of the park that formerly operated as a themed subsection of the Grande Exposition. The section operated as a part of Action Zone until 2019, when the eastern portion of Action Zone reverted to its original name and world's fair theming.

==== International Street ====
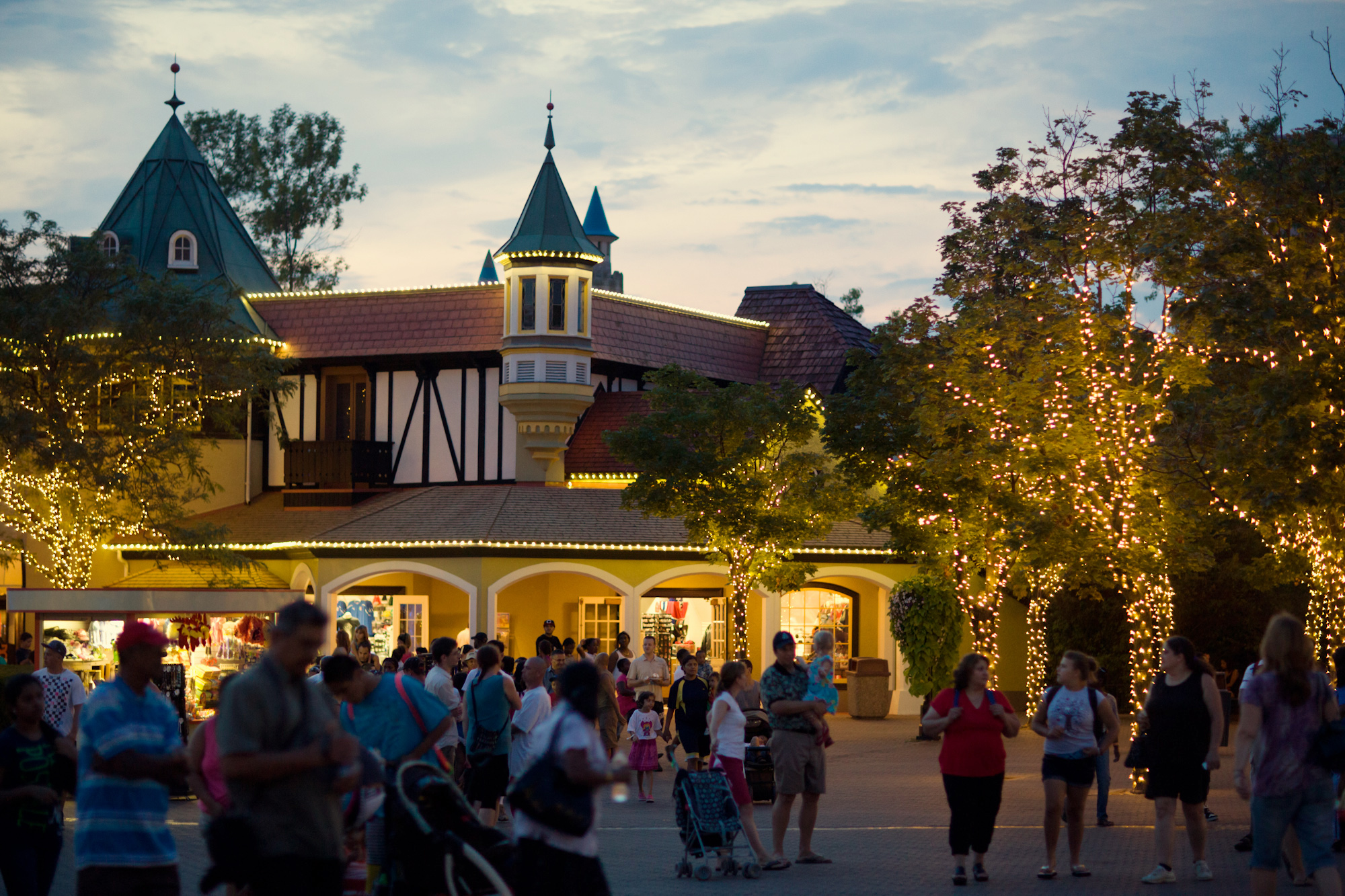
International Street, Canada's Wonderland entry area, is lined with shops and restaurants.

International Street is the park's entry area, similar to the Main Street, U.S.A. sections of Walt Disney Parks and Resorts. Using a format borrowed from sister parks Kings Island and Kings Dominion, both sides of the street are lined with shops, including souvenir shops, clothing stores, restaurants, and candy stores. Unlike the use of replica Eiffel Towers at Kings Island and Kings Dominion, Wonder Mountain, the park's centrepiece, appears at the end of the street. In the early decades of the park's history, stores sold high-quality imported goods themed to the buildings, and restaurants sold food and beverages from non-North American culinary traditions, such as shrimp, paella, and smoked sausage. The buildings are named the Latin, Scandinavian, Mediterranean, and Alpine Buildings.

International Street has hosted to a number of shows presented at the park, including:

Shows presented on International Street, 1981–present
Show	Year opened	Year closed	Description
Snoopy's Symphony of Water	2014	N/A	On an hourly/semi-hourly basis, Snoopy Conducts the royal fountain in a dazzling spectacle. The park uses the dancing fountain from the nighttime spectacular Starlight Spectacular.
Victoria Falls High Divers	1981	N/A	Professional divers perform acrobatic dives off a 18-metre (60-foot) platform from Wonder Mountain's Victoria Falls into the pool below.
Starlight Spectacular	2011	N/A	This nightly light and sound show that takes place on Canada's Wonderland's International Street at approximately 10:00 pm EST. The show was introduced to the park for the 2011 season as well to celebrate Canada's Wonderland's 30th birthday. Now known as "Starlight: Northern Reflections".
The Eruption	1998	2001	A nighttime pyrotechnic show with 12-metre (40-foot) flames, smoke, ash, geysers, and even more special effects. The park removed this show as it became very expensive to produce due to using liquid propane for large flame effects with minimal smoke. The show consisted of three 5–10 minute segments in a 20–30 minute show. While the show lasted, it drew large crowds to the front of the park. One of the most notable shows on International Street besides Starlight Spectacular, the "new version" of The Eruption uses modern-day technology now available.
Electric Circus (annual)	1998	2001	Electric Circus (also known as EC) was a Canadian live dance music television program that aired on MuchMusic and Citytv from 16 September 1988 to 12 December 2003. The name originated from a nightclub that once existed at Citytv's first studio at 99 Queen Street East in Toronto. The show came to the park annually until 2001 when MuchMusic discontinued their partnership with Canada's Wonderland and transitioned to pop culture programming for youth.

==== Medieval Faire ====
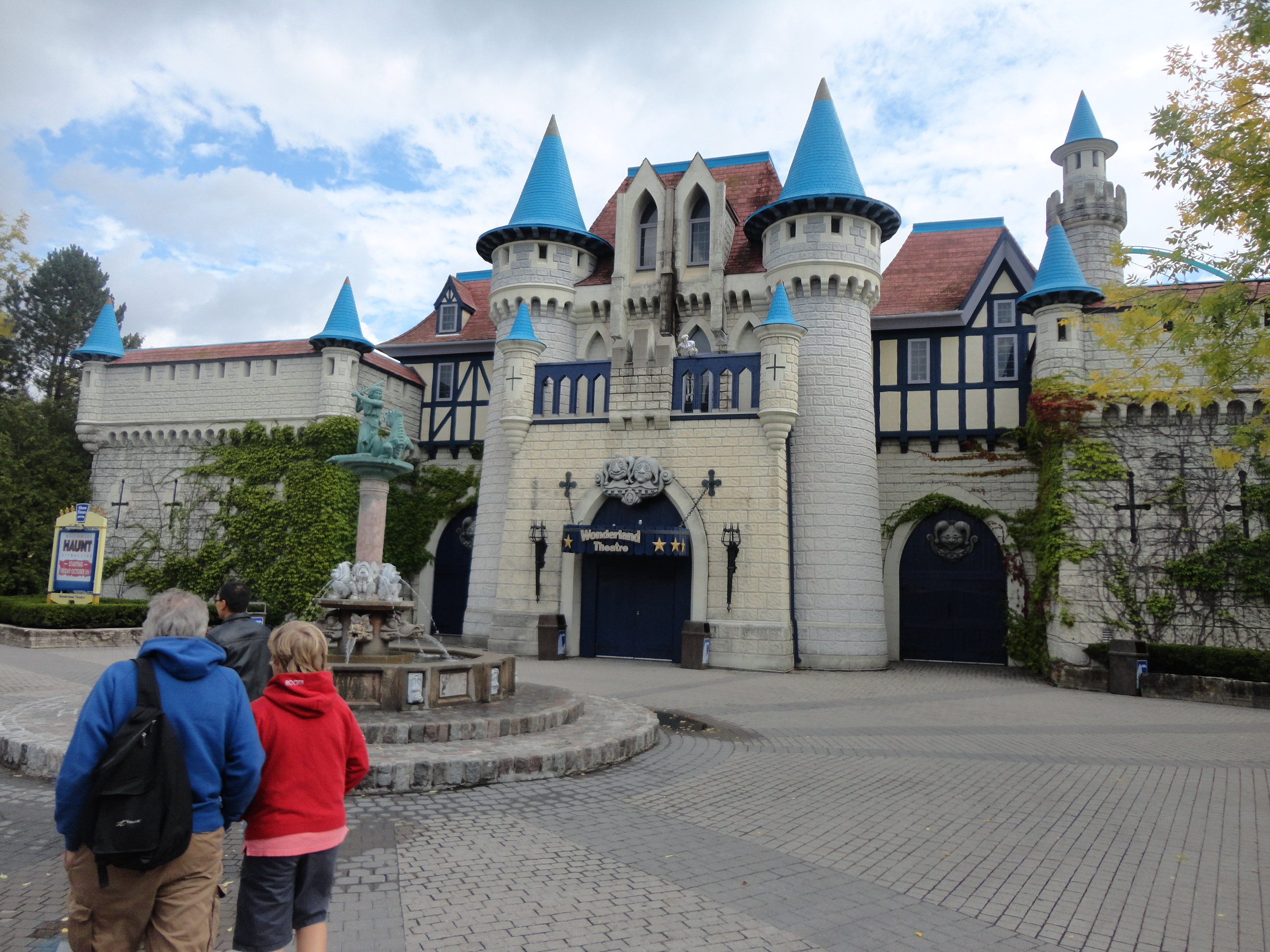
The Medieval Faire's setting, and most of its rides, are medieval-themed.

The Medieval Faire section of the park has a medieval European theme in both the setting and the rides. The two original roller coasters, Wilde Beast and Dragon Fyre, use pseudo-Elizabethan English spellings before being renamed using modern spelling (Wild Beast and Dragon Fire) from 1998 to 2018. Many of the original names of some the attractions have reverted to their pseudo-Elizabethan spelling, such as Dragon Fyre, Wilde Beast, Wilde KnightMares, Viking's Rage, and Canterbury Theatre. These renames occurred prior to the beginning of the 2019 season.

The stores, midway games and restaurants follow the medieval theme, as does the castle theatre (Canterbury Theatre, renamed Paramount Theatre during Paramount's ownership, and Wonderland Theatre until 2019) and a pirate show (originally opened with the park as Sea Sceptre and later replaced with Kinet-X Dive Show) in the middle of Arthur's Baye. However, rides such as Drop Tower, Riptide, Spinovator, and Speed City Raceway have no medieval theme.

Canterbury Theatre hosted ice shows from 2006 to 2011 and hosted Cirque Ambiente in mid-2012 and mid-2013.

==== Children's areas ====
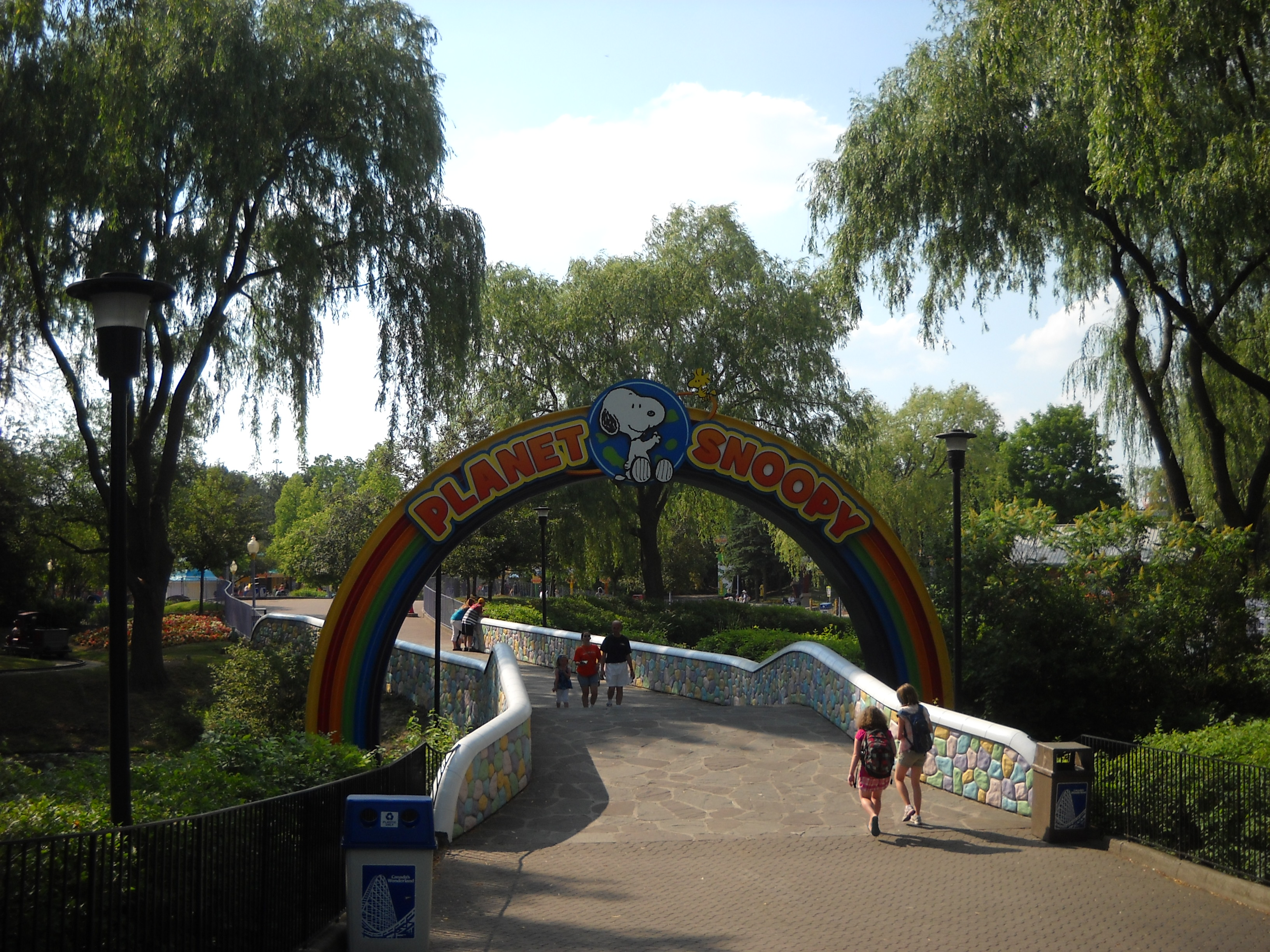
One of the entrances to Planet Snoopy, a children's area themed after the Peanuts comic strip.

There are presently two children's areas at Canada's Wonderland, KidZville, and Planet Snoopy. A third themed area known as Zoom Zone also exists as a part of KidZville section.

The children's areas in Canada's Wonderland originally were themed as The Happyland of Hanna-Barbera. The three areas were themed as Yogi's Woods, Scoobyville, and Bedrock; the first was converted to Smurf Village in 1984 and the last also had a marine mammal show held at the Bedrock Aquarium. In 1993, the Smurf area transitioned to Kids Kingdom, which became KidZville in 1998. In 2003, Bedrock became Nickelodeon Central; Bedrock Aquarium and its marine mammal show closed down as well. The park replaced Nickelodeon Central and Hanna Barbera Land with Planet Snoopy for the 2010 season, standardizing the park with the rest of the Cedar Fair chain. Planet Snoopy is a section of the park themed after the comic strip Peanuts.

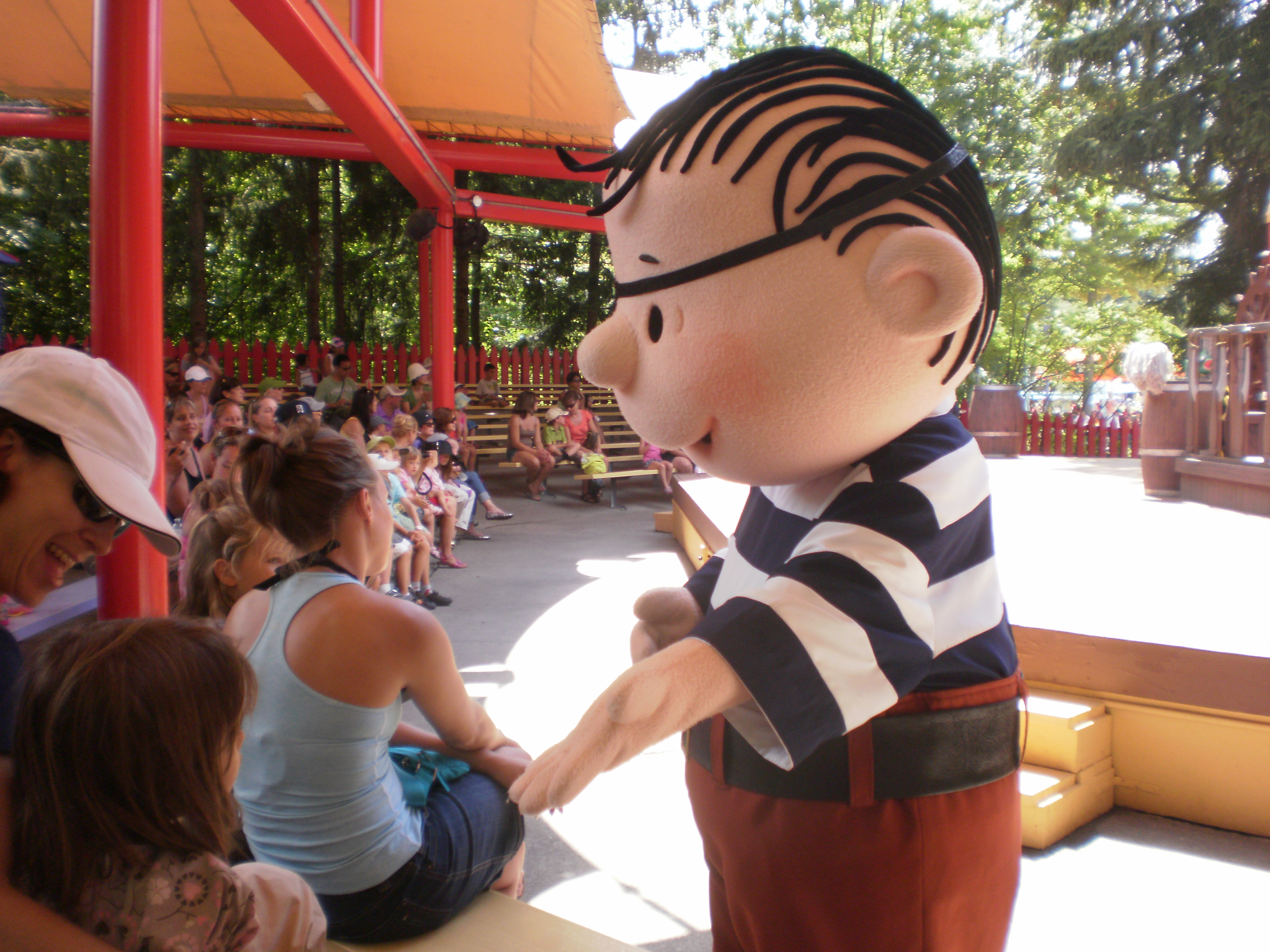
A Peanuts character at the Playhouse Theatre in KidZville, one of two children's areas at the park

The Zoom Zone subsection of KidZville was created in 2001 with the debut of Silver Streak; it also contains the small rides Blast Off and Jumpin' Jet. One of the KidZville rides, and originally a Kids Kingdom ride, Jumbo Bumps, was removed to make way for these three rides and the new section. Starting in 2004, Zoom Zone was no longer shown on park maps as an independent section. However, since Cedar Fair's acquisition, each of the three rides are depicted in Zoom Zone, and park signage continues to use the name.

The first ride accident in the park's history occurred on 23 August 2003, when the Jimmy Neutron Brainwasher (later renamed Woodstock Whirlybirds with appropriate retheming due to Cedar Fair's contract with Peanuts) fell apart. Three children were sent to hospital as a precautionary measure.

==== Splash Works ====
Opened in 1992, Splash Works is an 20-acre (10 ha) water park. The water park has over 7,570,000 litres (2,000,000 US gal) of heated water, a lazy river, and 16 water slides. The water park is home to Whitewater Bay, the largest outdoor wave pool in Canada, measuring 3,300 square metres (36,000 square feet). The water park is included with the price of admission to Canada's Wonderland and is open from late May to early September.

== Attractions ==
Canada's Wonderland has over 200 attractions (including games), with over 60 thrill rides. The park holds a number of Canadian records, among them the most roller coasters, with 18.

=== Roller coasters ===
Thrill rating (out of 5)
1 (low) 2 (mild) 3 (moderate) 4 (high) 5 (aggressive)

Name	Year opened	Manufacturer	Location	Description	Thrill rating
AlpenFury	2025	Premier Rides	Alpenfest	An LSM launched roller coaster with nine inversions, breaking the record for most inversions on a launch roller coaster.	5
Backlot Stunt Coaster	2005	Premier Rides	Action Zone	A family LIM-launched roller coaster based on the chase sequence of the 2003 film remake of The Italian Job. Formerly known as The Italian Job: Stunt Track (2005–2007).	4
Behemoth	2008	Bolliger & Mabillard	Action Zone	A steel hypercoaster that opened in 2008. It has a maximum height of 70 metres (230 feet) and a maximum speed of 124 km/h (77 mph). Rather than four seats across in straight rows, a setup common in many B&M roller coasters, Behemoth debuted a new seating arrangement that has four seats arranged in a "V" formation.	5
DareDeviler	1995	Vekoma	Grande World Expo	Canada's first inverted roller coaster and the ninth coaster added to the park, as well as the park's Suspended Looping Coaster (SLC). After the closure of Six Flags America in Maryland at the end of the 2025 season, Flight Deck received trains from that park's Professor Screamore's SkyWinder, itself also a Vekoma SLC. Formerly known as Top Gun (1995–2007), named after the 1986 film and Flight Deck (2008–2025).	5
Dragon Fyre	1981	Arrow Dynamics	Medieval Faire	A steel custom looping roller coaster that, along with five other roller coasters, debuted with the park's grand opening in 1981. It contains a pair of counter-clockwise corkscrews, a unique element among Arrow coasters. Formerly known as Dragon Fire (1997–2018).	5
Ghoster Coaster	1981	Philadelphia Toboggan Coasters	Planet Snoopy	A junior version of Wilde Beast and one of three wooden roller coasters at the park. It is also one of the original five coasters that debuted at the park's grand opening in 1981. Formerly known as Scooby's Gasping Ghoster Coaster (1981–2009).	4
Leviathan	2012	Bolliger & Mabillard	Medieval Faire	First giga coaster from Bolliger & Mabillard, which is the tallest and fastest roller coaster in Canada, and ranks high among the tallest and fastest in the world.	5
Mighty Canadian Minebuster	1981	Canada's Wonderland/The Gravity Group	Frontier Canada	A wooden roller coaster that is one of five roller coasters that debuted with the park's grand opening in 1981. It is modelled after a former ride, The Shooting Star, that was once located at Coney Island amusement park in Cincinnati, Ohio. It is the only roller coaster designed in-house specifically for Canada's Wonderland. It went on to get retracked by The Gravity Group in 2025 and 2026.	5
Silver Streak	2001	Vekoma	KidZville	A family inverted roller coaster and one of the first of its kind from Vekoma.	4
Snoopy's Racing Railway	2023	ART Engineering	Planet Snoopy	A family launched roller coaster located on part of the land previously occupied by Dinosaurs Alive!. Trains accelerate to 50 km/h (31 mph) and feature various twists and small drops.	4
Taxi Jam	1998	E&F Miler Industries	KidZville	A kiddie roller coaster that debuted with KidZville, an area of the park that opened in 1998. It makes two passes along its short track and is themed after the freeways of the Greater Toronto Area.	2
The Bat	1987	Vekoma	Medieval Faire	A Boomerang roller coaster model from Vekoma.	5
The Fly	1999	Mack Rides	Alpenfest	A Wild Mouse roller coaster featuring single cars that travel up to 56 km/h (35 mph).	4
Thunder Run	1986	Mack Rides	Alpenfest	A partially-enclosed steel roller coaster built inside of Wonder Mountain. Not to be confused with Blauer Enzian, a similar coaster that opened with the park.	4
Vortex	1991	Arrow Dynamics	Frontier Canada	A suspended roller coaster with a terrain layout similar to The Bat at Kings Island. It shares Wonder Mountain with Thunder Run, AlpenFury, and Wonder Mountain's Guardian for its lift and first drop, with the majority of the ride taking place over open water behind the mountain.	4
Wilde Beast	1981	Curtis D. Summers / Taft Broadcasting	Medieval Faire	A wooden roller coaster that was one of the five roller coasters to debut at the park's grand opening in 1981. It is modelled after the Wildcat coaster at Coney Island amusement park in Cincinnati, Ohio. Formerly known as Wilde Beast (1981–1997) and Wild Beast (1997–2018).	4
Wonder Mountain's Guardian	2014	Triotech / ART Engineering	Alpenfest	A 4D interactive dark ride roller coaster located inside Wonder Mountain that contains one of the largest drop tracks in the world.	4
Yukon Striker	2019	Bolliger & Mabillard	Frontier Canada	A dive coaster that opened as the tallest, fastest, and longest of its kind in the world, breaking the records previously held by Valravn at sister park Cedar Point.	5

=== Timeline of attractions ===
Current name in (parentheses) *Additions to Splash Works are italicized

1981–1990
- 1981: Park opens with:

Antique Carrousel, Balloon Race (Frequent Flyers), Bayern's Curve, Bedrock Dock "then operated at Carowinds as "Snoopy's Yacht Club" until its closure in 2017, Blauer Enzian, Dragon Fyre, Flintstone's Flyboys, Ghoster Coaster, Great Whale of China "now operates at Carowinds as "PEANUTS Pirates", Happy Landing (Swan Lake), Hot Rock Raceway, Klockwerks, Krachenwagen, Mighty Canadian Minebuster, Pharaoh's Eye, Wilde Beast, Quixote's Kettles (Spinovator), Scooby Choo (KidZville Station), Shiva's Fury (The Fury), Sol-Loco (Orbiter), Swings of the Century, Wilde Knightmares (Night Mares), Viking's Rage, Wonder Tour, and Zumba Flume.

- 1982: Kings Courtyard (The Courtyard)
- 1983: Kingswood Music Theatre
- 1984: White Water Canyon, Smurf Forest (until the 1990s)
- 1985: SkyRider
- 1986: Thunder Run (not to be confused with Blauer Enzian)
- 1987: The Bat
- 1988: Racing Rivers
- 1989: Timberwolf Falls
- 1990: Jet Scream
1991–2000
- 1991: Vortex
- 1992: Splash Works: Whirl Winds, Body Blast, Splash Island Kiddy Slides
- 1993: Kid's Kingdom play area (later renovated and renamed Maple Park Treehouse)
- 1994: "Days of Thunder" – Motion Simulator Movie Ride (Action Theatre)
- 1995: Top Gun (Flight Deck)
- 1996: Xtreme Skyflyer, Speed City Raceway; Splash Works: Wave Pool (White Water Bay), The Pump House, Black Hole
- 1997: Drop Zone: Stunt Tower (later renamed Drop Tower: Scream Zone)
- 1998: KidZville, James Bond – "License To Thrill" (feature at Action Theatre), Taxi Jam, The Edge Climbing Wall
- 1999: The Fly; Splash Works: Super Soaker and The Plunge; "Dino Island II: Escape from Dino Island 3D" (feature at Action Theatre)
- 2000: Cliffhanger (Later renamed Riptide), Scooby-Doo's Haunted Mansion (Boo Blasters on Boo Hill)
2001–2010
- 2001: Shockwave; Zoom Zone (new kids area) including: Silver Streak, Blast Off and Jumpin' Jet; "Stan Lee's 7th Portal 3D" (feature at the Action Theatre)
- 2002: Psyclone; Splash Works: Riptide Racer, Barracuda Blaster and Kids Sprayground
- 2003: Sledge Hammer, Nickelodeon Central (replacing Bedrock), "Warrior of the Dawn" (in Action Theatre), "SpongeBob SquarePants 3-D" (feature in Action Theatre), Launch Pad (trampolines; requires separate fee)
- 2004: Tomb Raider: The Ride (later renamed Time Warp); The return of "Days of Thunder" (feature at Action Theatre)
- 2005: Italian Job: Stunt Track (later renamed Backlot Stunt Coaster)
- 2006: "The Funtastic World of Hanna-Barbera" (feature at the Action Theatre), Nickelodeon Celebration Parade, Hollywood Stunt Spectacular
- 2007: Coasters 50s Diner, International Marketplace Buffet, Picnic Pavilion
- 2008: Behemoth
- 2010: Planet Snoopy (New Rides: Lucy's Tugboat, Peanuts 500, Snoopy's Revolution)
2011–2020
- 2011: WindSeeker, Starlight Spectacular
- 2012: Leviathan, Dinosaurs Alive!, Starlight Spectacular, "Dinosaurs: Giants of Patagonia 3D" (feature at the Action Theatre), Fast Lane
- 2013: "Monsters of the Deep 3D" (feature at the Action Theatre)
- 2014: Wonder Mountain's Guardian
- 2015: SlingShot, Splash Works: Typhoon and Splash Station, VIP Cabanas
- 2016: Flying Eagles and Skyhawk, "Robinson Crusoe 3D" (feature at the Action Theatre), "Stars of the Peking Acrobats" (show at Wonderland Theatre), VR on Thunder Run
- 2017: Soaring Timbers, "Our Canada" (feature at the Action Theatre), Cirque Canadien (show at Canterbury Theatre), Splash Works: Muskoka Plunge
- 2018: Lumberjack, Flying Canoes, Splash Works: Lakeside Lagoon
- 2019: Yukon Striker, Frontier Canada and WinterFest, Peanut's Putt Putt removed for Beagle Brigade Airfield
2021–2030
- 2021: Beagle Brigade Airfield, Splash Works: Mountain Bay Cliffs
- 2022: Lazy Bear Lodge (Multi-level rustic lodge-restaurant), International Food Festivals
- 2023: Tundra Twister, Snoopy's Racing Railway
- 2024: Splash Works: Moosehorn Falls
- 2025: AlpenFury

== Operations ==
=== Attendance ===
In 2024, Canada's Wonderland was the 17th most-visited amusement and theme park in North America, with the Themed Entertainment Association estimating attendance at 3.3 million visitors. Among Six Flags properties, Canada's Wonderland is the company's fifth-most-visited park by attendance.

Year	Attendance	Rank	Ref.
2000	2,970,000	20th	
2001	—N/a	—N/a	
2002	—N/a	—N/a	
2003	2,620,000	21st	
2004	—N/a	—N/a	
2005	3,600,000	14th	
2006	3,230,000	14th	
2007	3,250,000	14th	
2008	3,380,000	14th	
2009	3,160,000	14th	
2010	3,380,000	14th	
2011	3,481,000	14th	
2012	3,655,000	13th	
2013	3,582,000	14th	
2014	3,546,000	14th	
2015	3,617,000	13th	
2016	3,723,000	13th	
2017	3,760,000	13th	
2018	3,798,000	13th	
2019	3,950,000	13th	
2020	0 (Note: The park did not open in 2020 due to the COVID-19 pandemic.)	—N/a (Note: No rankings were done for the year due to the worldwide impacts on park attendance caused by the COVID-19 pandemic.)	
2021	587,000 (Note: The park only opened from July to September 2021 with limited capacity due to the COVID-19 pandemic.)	—N/a	
2022	3,768,000	13th	
2023	3,232,000	18th	
2024	3,264,000	17th	

=== Priority queuing ===
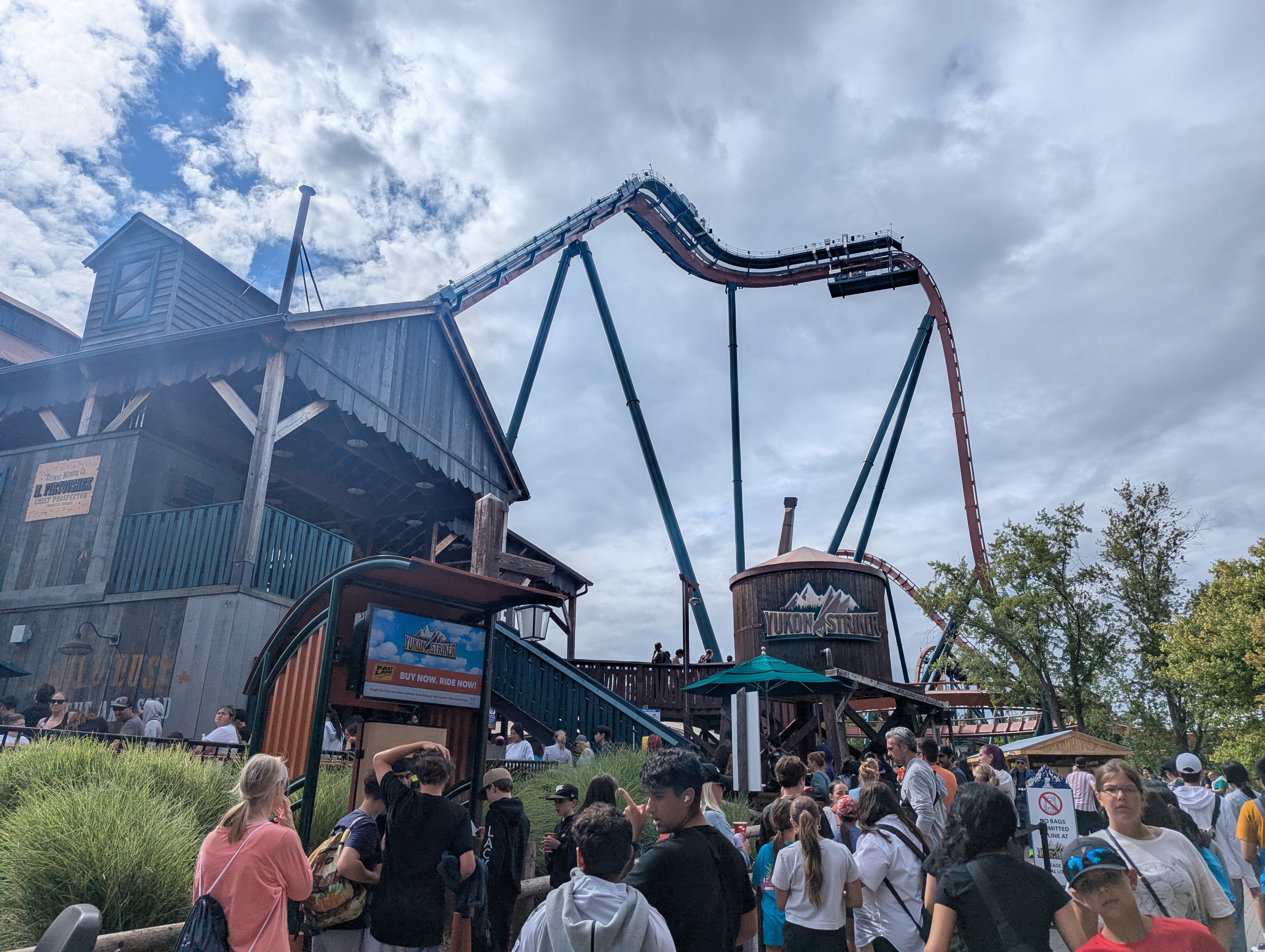
A queue for Yukon Striker, with a Fast Lane Plus purchase terminal placed next to the queue

Fast Lane is Canada's Wonderland's two-line system since 2012, which is also implemented at other Six Flags parks. For an additional cost, visitors receive a wrist band that enables them to bypass the 'normal-wait' line and enter the Fast Lane. Opting for this benefit essentially allows purchasers to cut in at the front of the line on 21 of the most popular attractions without waiting. In 2013, the park introduced Fast Lane Plus, which allowed purchasers to bypass the lines of two additional attractions (later three with the addition of Yukon Striker in 2019 and four with AlpenFury in 2025) that standard Fast Lane users would otherwise not have access to. Only a limited amount of both types of passes are sold each day.

==== Boarding pass for guests with disabilities ====
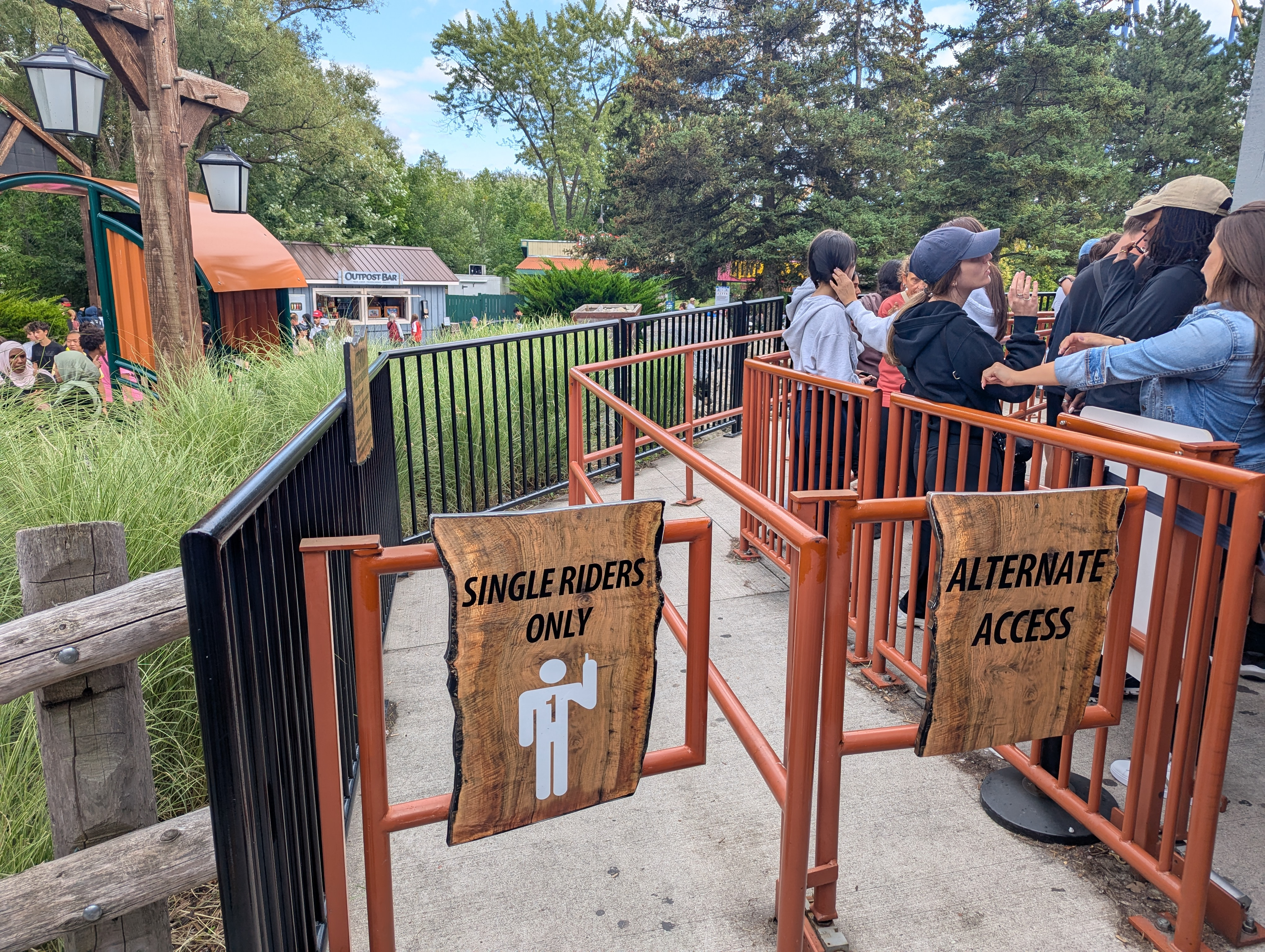
Single rider queue and alternate access queue for guests with mobility restrictions or ASD at Yukon Striker.

Similar accommodations are given to guests with restricted mobility issues and guests with cognitive impairments. Guests with these disabilities receive paper boarding passes in which ride operators provide wait times equal to those in the queue. These guests enter at the ride's exit. Boarding passes are not valid at any upcharge attraction (SlingShot and Speed City Raceway). Lazy River is the only attraction in Splash Works that accepts boarding passes.

== Logos ==
The park, from its opening in 1981, was known as Canada's Wonderland. In 1994, when Paramount Pictures (later Viacom) purchased the property, the name of the park changed to include the word Paramount, a practice Paramount Parks implemented with all of its parks in 1993. Prior to that, none of the Paramount-owned parks included Paramount in the name.

In 2003, Viacom updated the logo of Paramount Parks, and all its theme parks, including Wonderland, to include an updated Paramount logo, even though the logo for Paramount Pictures, the film studio, remained unchanged.

In 2006, CBS Corporation (split from Viacom in 2005) sold all of its theme park properties to Cedar Fair, which in turn, dropped the Paramount prefixes from all five parks (and thus reverted to their original names), and adopted a Cedar Fair logo and typeface. The logo and typeface have been retained even after Cedar Fair merged with Six Flags under the latter's name in 2024.

1981–1993

1994–2003

2003–2006

2007–present

== See also ==
- Incidents at Canada's Wonderland
- List of amusement parks in the Americas
- List of amusement park rankings
