= Psyclone (Canada's Wonderland) =

Amusement park ride

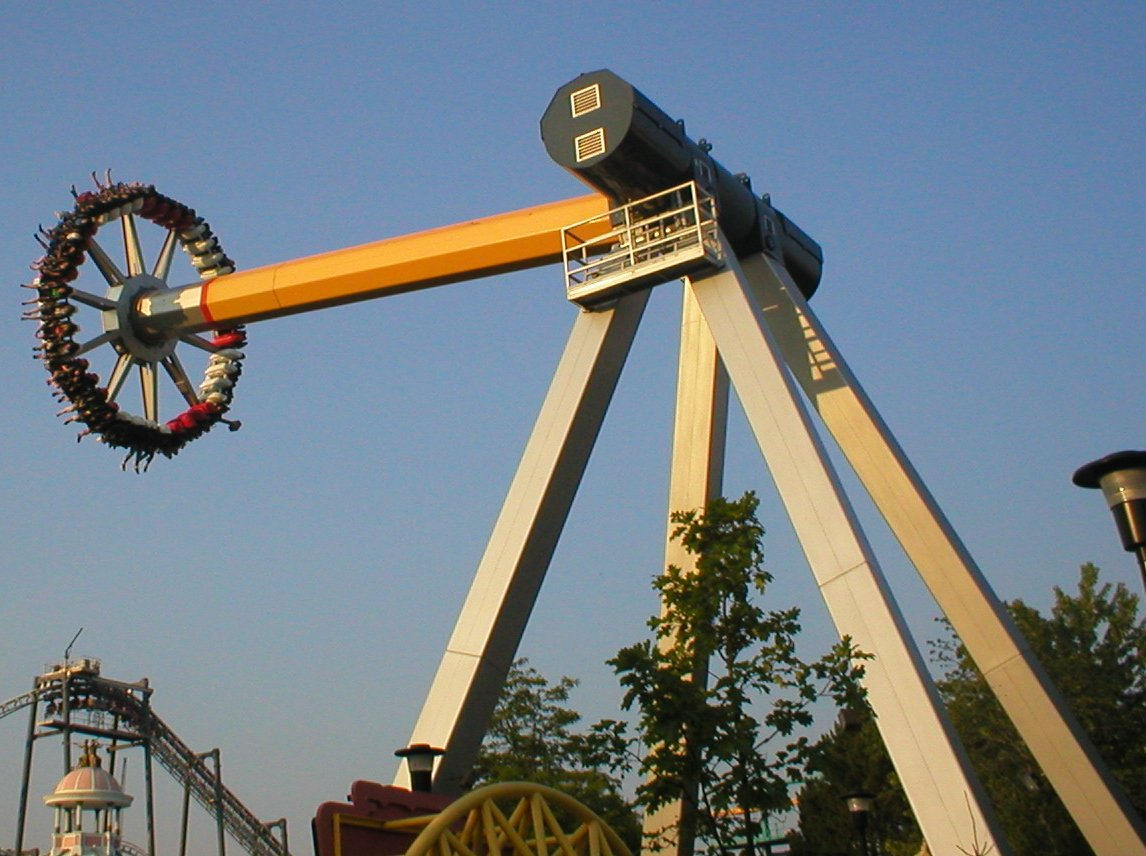
- Psyclone at Canada's Wonderland in 2005.

Canada's Wonderland
- Area: Action Zone
- Coordinates: 43°50′24.29″N 79°32′25.31″W
- Status: Operating
- Opening date: May 5, 2002
- Replaced: Pharaoh’s Falls/Water Snake (Racing Rivers)

Ride statistics
- Attraction type: Frisbee
- Manufacturer: Mondial
- Model: Revolution
- Height: 23 m (75 ft)
- Capacity: 800 riders per hour
- Vehicle type: Seats put in a circle facing outwards from a central pendulum.
- Vehicles: 1
- Riders per vehicle: 40
- Duration: 1 minute and 58 seconds
- Height restriction: 137 cm (4 ft 6 in)
- Fast Lane available

Psyclone is a 23 metres (75 ft) ride at Canada's Wonderland. On May 5, 2002, this Mondial ride was opened to the public at the park. The 1 minute and 54 second ride features 40 seats facing outwards which rotate from a central pendulum as the ride reaches its maximum arc angle of 120 degrees. Even though the ride height is 23 metres (75 ft), when the ride reaches the top of its swing, the height becomes 37 metres (121 ft) high.

== Ride experience ==
The rider's experience depends on where they are seated on the ride. Before the ride begins, the floor under the riders' feet descends lower (almost like going deeper in the ground) due to how the pendulum swings. If the floor did not move, serious injury to riders' legs and bodies would occur. Due to the way in which the seats rotate, all riders face different angles of the ride. Depending on where the rider is seated, they may experience some air-time as the swing reaches its maximum angle. When the ride cycle ends, the pendulum returns to the 'loading position' and the floor rises to the riders' feet, allowing riders to exit and enter the ride.

== Structure ==
Psyclone is made primarily out of 7 major parts: the 4 supports around the ride which support the motor that allows the pendulum to swing, the motor itself (the blue part on top of the ride) which supports the pendulum, the pendulum itself which supports the seats for the ride, and the seats themselves.
