= Halloween Haunt (Canada's Wonderland) =

Halloween event at Canada's Wonderland in Vaughan, Ontario, Canada

- Halloween Haunt at Canada's Wonderland logo
- Genre: Halloween
- Frequency: Annual
- Locations: Canada's Wonderland; 43°50′33.16″N 79°32′31.00″W
- Years active: 2005–2019, 2021–present
- Inaugurated: 2005
- Website: sixflags.com/canadaswonderland/events/haunt

Halloween Haunt, previously known as "Fearfest", is a Halloween event at Canada's Wonderland located in Vaughan, Ontario, Canada. It runs after the park's regular operating hours on Friday, Saturday, and Sunday evenings in October until the end of October or early November – up to, and recently in the 2019 season, not including Halloween night. It is Canada's largest haunted theme park featuring over 300 monsters, six walk-through "maze" attractions, seven uniquely themed atmospheric scare areas, and three live shows. During its operation, the grounds are transformed via decorative props, thematic music, eerie lighting to further create its scary atmosphere.

== History ==
The original concept was test-run in the late 90's inside the beverage tent in Kingswood during the day, but the full scale haunted theme park concept was introduced in 2005, then called Fearfest while the park was under the ownership of Paramount Parks. Fearfest at Paramount Canada's Wonderland originally operated on weekday evenings through October, with eight frightening mazes, later on in the years when Paramount sold the park new owners added the "Skeleton Key" and "Fright Lane".

Most of the park's regular rides and attractions (with the exception of Nickelodeon Central, KidZville and Hanna-Barbera Land) continued to be staffed and operated during Fearfest, including the 'Haunted' Thunder Run coaster, which was slightly thematically changed to match the park. The park grounds were divided into three separately themed scare areas – The Curse of Sleepy Hollow, MTV Rockin' Scare, and Backlot Blood Bath – each having 2–3 mazes associated with it. Each maze and scare area generally has its own unique back story, sometimes linking several mazes together.

The following year, Paramount extended its regular operating season through the family-oriented Halloween event "Spooktacular" in the typically closed child-oriented areas of the park, to match Fearfest's attendance in October. In 2006 the park ran Spooktacular from October 14–29 on weekends during the day, and would reopen the park as Fearfest in the evening.

With the change in ownership of the park from Paramount to the Cedar Fair Entertainment Company, the Fearfest name was dropped and renamed Halloween Haunt, remaining consistent with similar attractions at other Cedar Fair theme parks across North America. In addition, Spooktacular was not revived for the 2007 operating season. Despite this, Canada's Wonderland still continued regular daytime park hours during the Halloween Haunt run. To replace Spooktacular, the park created Camp Spooky, to fit in with the Peanuts theming of the kids area. With an existing history of running haunted attractions since 1973 at Knott's Berry Farm's event, Knott's Scary Farm, Cedar Fair was able to incorporate four additional mazes to the roster while retiring the Legend of the Lost and Slaughter Street attractions.

In 2008, Halloween Haunt saw an extended seasonal run into November, breaking the park's own attendance records for the event. Cedar Fair also retired the MTV Rockin' Scare area, including the Total Request Dead and Ozzburnes mazes in order to introduce three new ones for the season. The "adult-oriented'" horror musical show Dead Awakening also opened during the 2008 Halloween Haunt, performing at the Wonderland Theatre. There are currently seven atmospheric scare areas with free-roaming monsters in the park: Gates of Terror, Ghostly Pines, CarnEvil, Wicked Hollow, The Plague and Trick or Treat. A new scare zone, "Frontier's Revenge", is being introduced for the 2019 season.

Halloween Haunt did not occur in 2020 due to the COVID-19 pandemic. The event returned in Fall 2021 as an outdoor only event by eliminating all Mazes. The mazes returned in 2022 when most COVID-19 restrictions put in place by the province of Ontario were lifted.

== Current attractions ==
=== Mazes ===
Attraction	Type	Opened	Location
Cornstalkers	Maze	2005	White Water Canyon
Dark Ride	Maze	2023	Front Gate
Demons of the Deep	Maze	2024	Action Theatre
The Ruins	Maze	2013	Wonder Mountain
Spirit Manor	Maze	2015	Action Theatre
The Crypt	Maze	2018	Medieval Faire
The Conjuring: Beyond Fear	Interactive Experience	2025	Wonder Mountain

=== Scare Zones ===
Attraction	Type	Location
Gates of Terror	Scare Zone	International Street (by Front Gate)
CarnEvil	Scare Zone	International Festival (by Klockwerks)
Necropolis	Scare Zone	Grande World Expo (by Time Warp)
Kingdom of Carnage	Scare Zone	Medieval Faire (by Castle)
Trick or Treat Street	Scare Zone	Frontier Canada (by Splash Works)
Wicked Hollow	Scare Zone	Action Zone (by Skyhawk)
Streets of the Undead	Scare Zone	Actions Zone (by Sledge Hammer)

=== Shows ===
Show	Location	Closest scare zone (or located in)
Freak Show	International Festival	CarnEvil
Inferno	Medieval Faire at Arthur's Bay	Kingdom of Carnage
Head Bangers	Action Zone	Necropolis

== Retired attractions ==
- Illusionist – Show (retired 2022)
- The Farmstead – Scarezone (retired 2022)
- Ghostly Pines – Scarezone (retired 2022)
- Pandemonium – Maze (retired 2022)
- Sink the Jerk – Show (retired 2021)
- Forest of Fear – Scarezone (retired 2021)
- Frontier's Revenge – Scarezone (retired 2021)
- SCI-FI House-Maze (retired 2019)
- Blackout-Maze (retired 2019)
- Toxic Party Zone – Show (retired 2019)
- Radioactive: LED Dance Show – Show (retired 2019)
- The Gallows – Show (retired 2019)
- Bloodshed – Maze (retired 2019)
- Forest of Fear – Maze (retired 2019)
- Code Red – Maze (retired 2019)
- Sinner's Lounge – Show (retired 2018)
- Bloody Buccaneers – Scarezone (retired 2018)
- Club Blood – Maze (retired 2018)
- Mysterion The Mind Reader – Show (retired 2018)
- Cryohazard – Scarezone (retired 2017)
- Louisiana Scream – Maze (retired 2017)
- Streets of The Undead – Maze (retired 2017)
- Toxicity – Show (retired 2016)
- The Asylum – Maze (retired 2016)
- Terror of London – Maze (retired 2016)
- Clowns at Midnight – Maze (retired 2015)
- Steampunk – Scarezone (retired 2015)
- Mother Noose – Maze (retired 2014)
- Blood on the Bayou – Maze (retired 2013)
- Iron Empire – Maze (retired 2013)
- Kingdom of Carnage – Maze (retired 2013) - Converted to Scare Zone 2021
- Red Beard's Rage – Maze (retired 2013)
- Blood Drums – Show (retired 2013)
- Haunted House 3D – Action Theatre Show (retired 2013)
- Miner's Revenge – Maze (retired 2012)
- Beyond The Grave – Show (retired 2012)
- The Hanging – Show (retired 2012)
- Fun House Express – Action Theatre Show (retired 2012)
- Elvira's Superstition – Action Theatre Show (retired 2012)
- Psycho Circus – Show (retired 2011)
- Fangs – Show (retired 2010)
- A Midsummer Nights Scream- Maze (retired 2010)
- Dead Awakening – Show (retired 2009)
- Massacre Manor – Maze (retired 2009)
- Slaughter Mill – Maze (retired 2009)
- Total Request DEAD – MTV Rockin' Scare Maze (retired 2008)
- The Ozzburnes – MTV Rockin' Scare Maze (retired 2008)
- Legend of the Lost: The Director's Cut – Backlot Blood Bath Maze (retired 2007)
- Slaughter Street Fear Zone – Backlot Blood Bath Maze (retired 2007)
- Spooktacular – KidZville/Nickelodeon Central Area (retired 2007)

== See also ==
- Halloween Haunt (disambiguation), Halloween events at other Six Flags parks
