= Timberwolf Falls =

Water ride in Canada

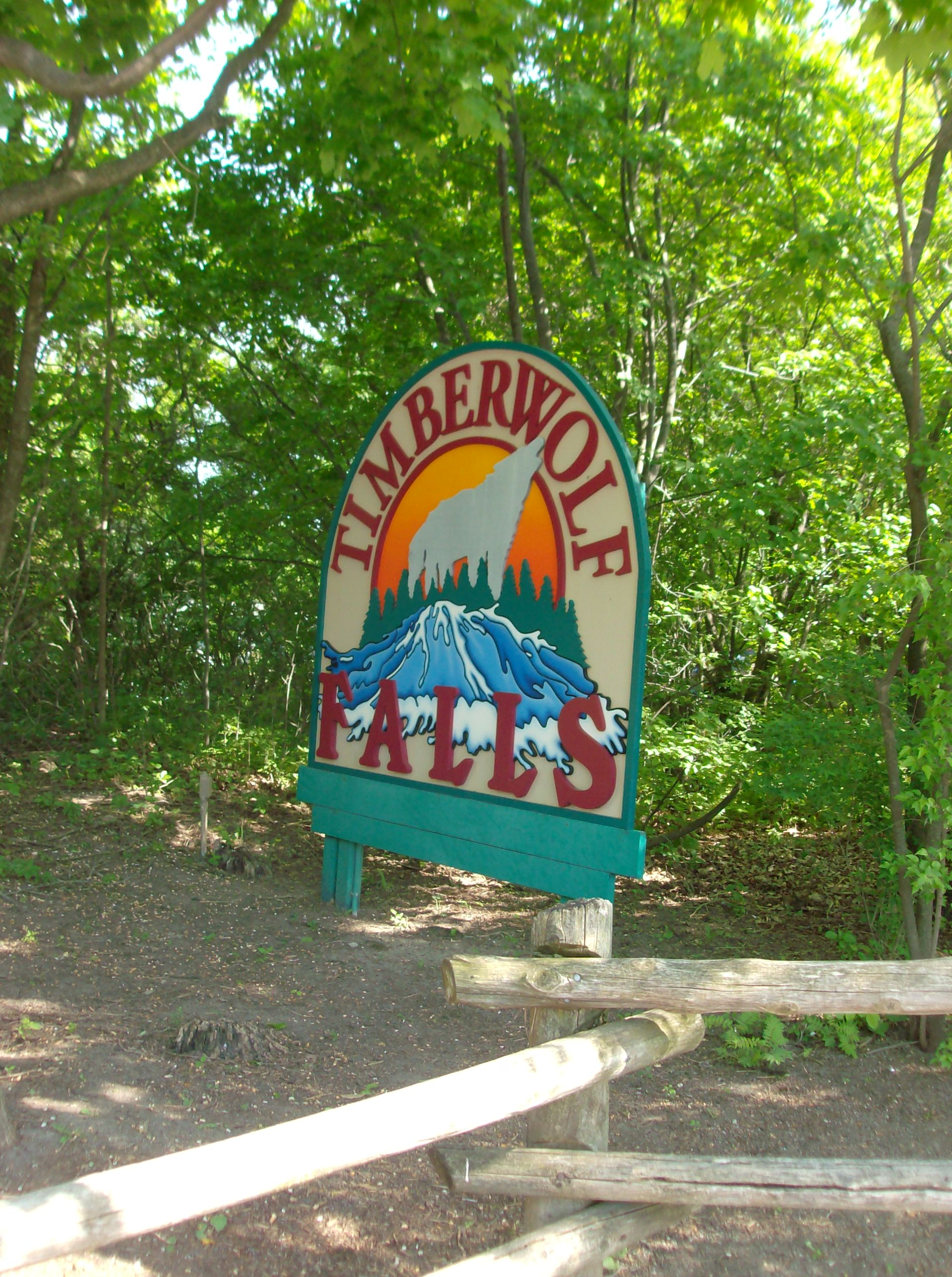
- Sign for the ride

Canada's Wonderland
- Area: Frontier Canada
- Coordinates: 43°50′29.44″N 79°32′38.89″W
- Status: Operating
- Opening date: 1989

General statistics
- Type: Shoot the chute
- Manufacturer: Hopkins Rides
- Model: Shoot the Chutes
- Course: Large oval
- Lift system: Wood and Cable lift
- Height: 15 m (49 ft)
- Drop: 15 m (49 ft)
- Speed: 59 km/h (37 mph)
- Duration: 2 minutes and 40 seconds
- Boats: 4 or 5 boats. Riders are arranged 4 across in 5 rows for a total of 20 riders per boat.
- Height restriction: 117 cm (3 ft 10 in)
- Fast Lane available

Timberwolf Falls is a Shoot the chute water ride that opened in 1989 at Canada's Wonderland. The ride contains a basic oval shape and features one drop creating a wave soaking all riders. The ride also features a Splash Zone which allows spectators to get soaked by the wave from a bridge located above the main drop.

== Ride experience ==
Riders take a seat in one of the twenty seats in the boat. Once the all-clear is given by the ride operators, the boat begins to climb a lift leading to the top of the ride. Once at the top, the boat makes a 180 degree turn and immediately plunges down the drop. Immediately after the boat reaches the bottom of the drop, a giant wave is created soaking all riders and spectators on the bridge above. The boat then heads start for a few seconds and makes a final 180 degree turn leading to the station. Depending on the total weight of the boat, a giant or medium-sized wave can be created (More weight equals bigger wave). One ride cycle lasts around 2 minutes and 40 seconds.

=== Splash Zone ===
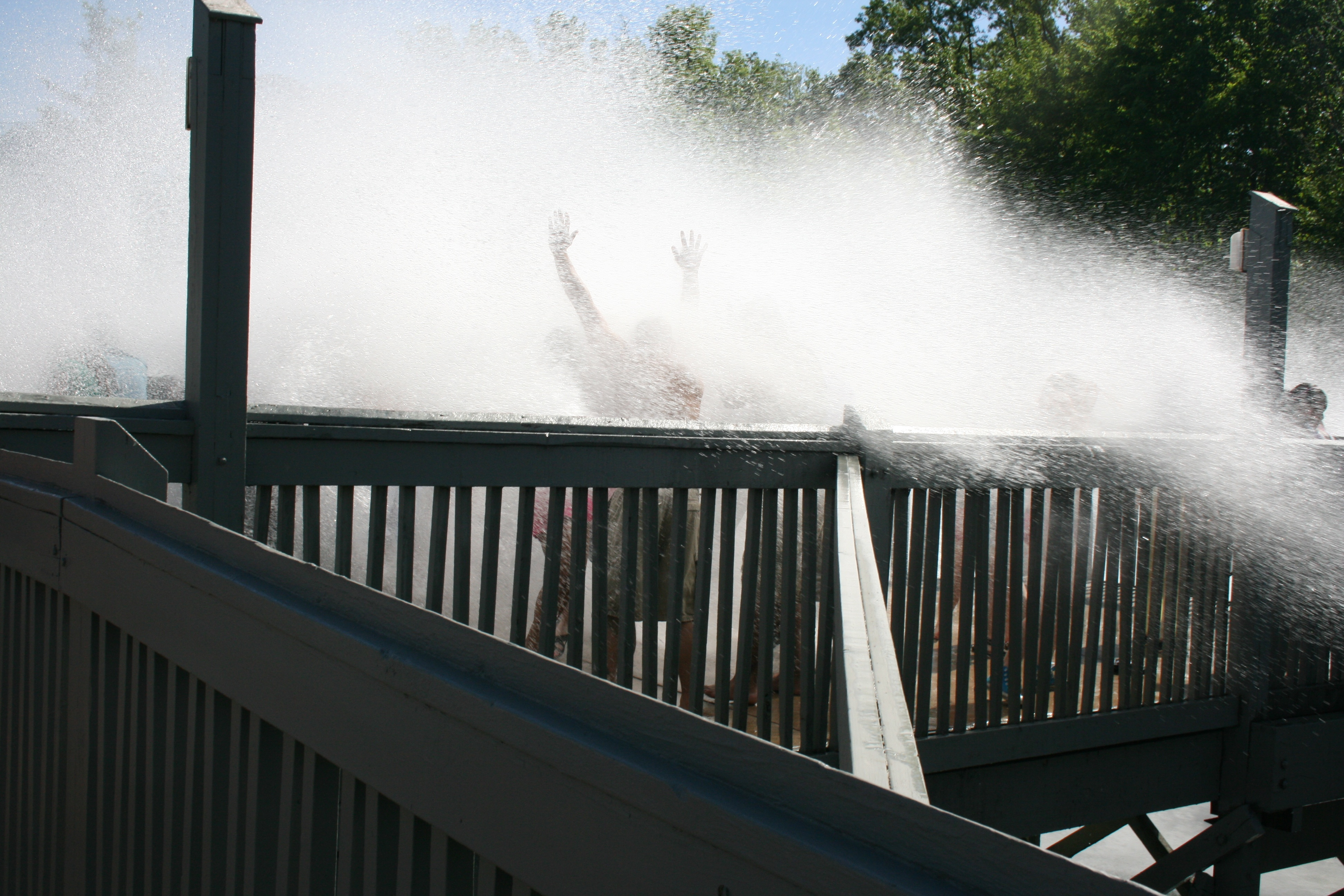
Spectators being hit and soaked in the Splash Zone by a wave created as a boat makes it to the bottom of the drop.

The Splash Zone is a bridge that goes over the bottom of the drop of Timberwolf Falls. There, spectators can stand waiting for one of the boats to come down the drop and create a wave which does in fact make it to the bridge soaking not only riders but also spectators standing on the bridge. Also, all riders must cross the bridge as the Splash Zone is part of the exit to the ride.
