= Terra Mítica =

Theme park in Spain

- Interactive map of Terra Mítica
- Location: Benidorm, Comunitat Valenciana, Spain
- Coordinates: 38°33′37″N 0°09′32″W
- Opened: 27 July 2000
- Owner: Aqualandia-Mundomar
- Operating season: April to November

Attractions
- Total: 25
- Roller coasters: (4) 1 standing but not operating
- Water rides: 3
- Website: terramiticapark.com

Terra Mítica (Valencian: [ˈtɛra ˈmitika], also [ˈtɛrɛ ˈmitika]) is a theme park located in Benidorm, Comunitat Valenciana, Spain. The park is divided into five themed zones: Egypt, Greece, Rome, Iberia, and the Islands (of the Mediterranean). The park opened in 2000.

In 2001, a year after park opening, Paramount Parks entered into an agreement to manage Terra Mítica, and the park was branded as a Paramount Park for the following season. In 2004, the park filed for the Spanish equivalent of bankruptcy protection from its creditors. Since then, the park has operated independently. Terra Mítica emerged from temporary receivership in 2006, after restructuring its expenses, reducing labor costs, and canceling debt through the sale of unused park land. After generating an average negative operating profit of 8 million € per year from its inception, Terra Mítica produced positive EBITDA in 2006.

For the 2008 season, Terra Mítica added a new free access area including major branded food chains and shops as well as an outdoor adventure park. Plans for the 2009 season included the addition of shopping outlets adjacent to the Iberia section of the park. A hotel was planned to be built by Ortiz Hijos in the area just behind the Egypt section of the park.

For the 2013 season, the park was divided into two separate parks: Iberia Park and Terra Mítica. Iberia Park is a free-admission area that requires tokens to be bought to access the rides. It covers half of the Egypt zone and all of the Iberia and Islands areas. Terra Mítica is a pay-to-enter area where all rides are free while inside. For the 2014 season, Iberia Park became gated, requiring a ticket to enter. Iberia Park is only open for two months from 2016 onwards.

In 2016, the Luxor Hotel was opened. To coincide with the hotel's opening, the season was reduced to three months, but prices were increased, causing many season pass holders to complain.

It appears as if in the 2021 season only Iberia Park reopened, as the map of Terra Mítica and all its attractions were removed from the website. In addition to that, some of Iberia Park's more elaborate attractions, such as El Rescate de Ulises (Ulysses' Rescue), also stayed closed. A new show, Fantasia was premiered in the auditorium in the islands section. The former Barbarossa arena was heavily refurbished to house a new show, Iroko. The show would run for the 2021 season but would not continue into 2022. The arena is now unused and still features the refurbishments for the show.

In 2022, the whole park opened up again with the addition of a new, high production show in the Circus maximus venue. Espartaco, Honor y coraje makes use of: projection mapping, stunts, horses, chariots and gladiator battles. The Fantasia show continued on in this season and performed alongside Espartaco.

In 2023, a new horror passage, Arde Troya, opened in the queue line of the former ride, El Rescate de Ulises. The maze lasts around 6-7 minutes with the inclusion of around 7 actors. In addition to this, 3 new shows were added on top of Espartaco Honor y coraje and Fantasia. These include El sueño de Egipto, a multidisciplinary show in the parks main entrance, La magica de Los dioses, a magic show featured in a temporary venue in the Greece zone, and The Spanish Horse, a dance show featured in front of the Fantasia auditorium.

== Park Structure ==
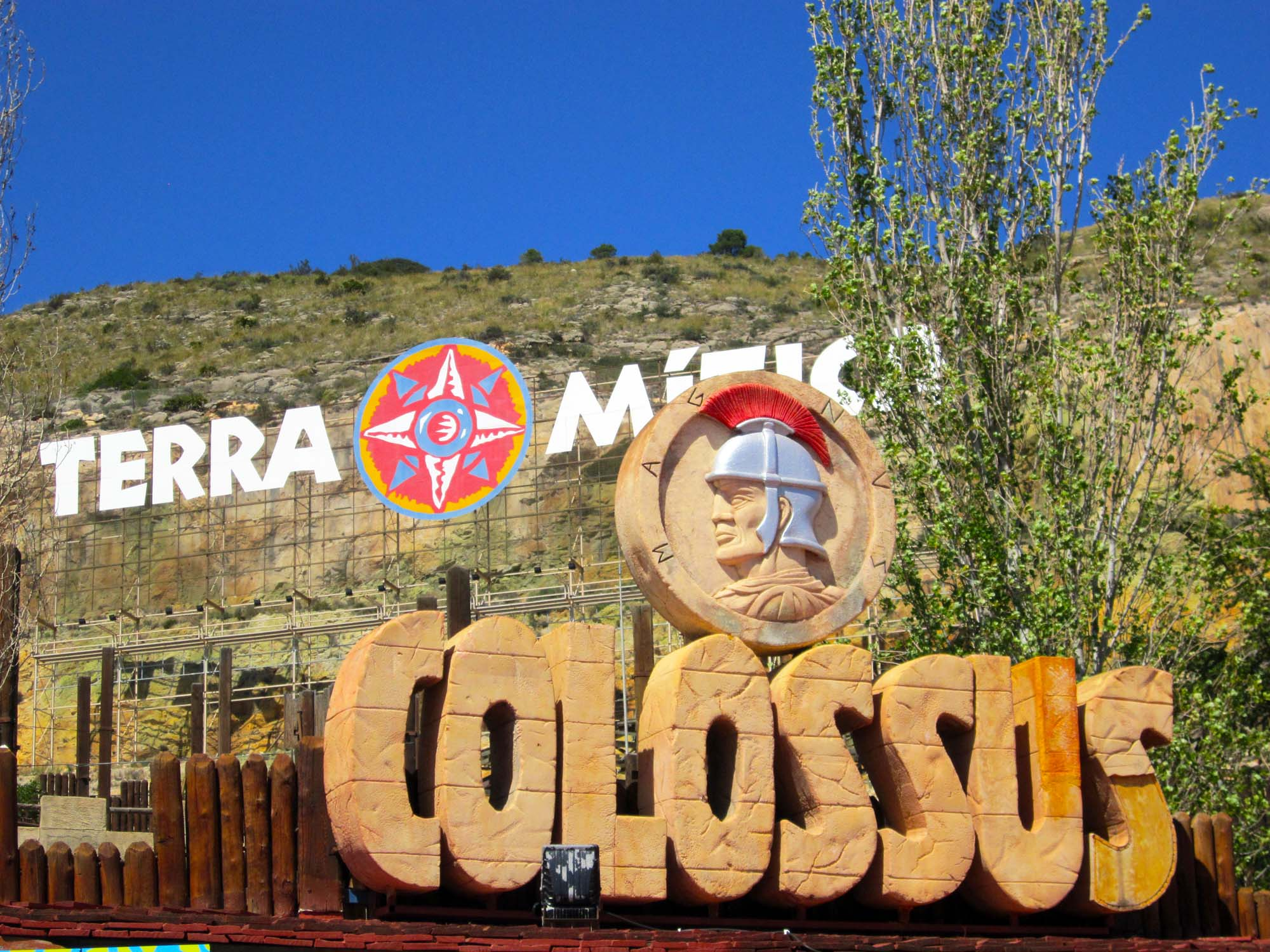
Entrance of Magnus Colossus, the wooden roller coaster.

The park is organized into five thematic areas, each influenced by their respective origins:

- Egypt
- Greece
- Rome
- Iberia
- The Islands - This area is influenced by the ancient Mediterranean cultures and history.

In 2008, the following areas were added to the park:

- Ocionía - A free access area with themed shops, branded restaurants, and pay-as-you-go attractions. Ocionia is located just before the park entrance area.
- Atalaya - An outdoor adventure and obstacle course with challenges for adults and children alike. Atalaya is adjacent to the park entrance.

=== Rides ===
In total, there are 25 rides at the park. The list of rides by complexity is given below (strong - red colour, medium - yellow colour, easy - green colour, children - blue colour).

Park	Ride	Description
Greece	La Furia de Tritón (Triton's Fury)	A Shoot the Chute ride with two drops built by Intamin
Greece	SynKope	A flat ride, 35 metres in height, reaching a velocity of 90 km/h. Built by Mondial in 2004.
Greece	Titánide	A Vekoma SLC roller coaster
Greece	El Laberinto del Minotauro (The Labyrinth of the Minotaur)	A dark ride built by Sally Corporation featuring an ETF ride system.
Greece	Los Ícaros (The Icarus)	A swing ride built by Zierer
Greece	Templo de Kinetos (Kinetos' Temple)	A motion simulator
Greece	Alucinakis	A children's roller coaster built by Zamperla
Greece	Arriarrix	Ride on the backs of unicorns and pasting into a meadow of Ancient Greece.
Iberia	Arietes	A bumper car ride
Iberia	Jabato	A children's bumper car ride
Egypt	Cataratas del Nilo (The Falls of Nile)	A log flume ride built by MACK Rides. It has two drops, one in reverse, with its biggest drop being 20 metres height.
Egypt	Akuatiti	A children's log flume
Egypt	La Batalla de la Pirámide (The Battle of the Pyramid)	An indoor paintball game
Egypt	La Pirámide del Terror (Horror Pyramid)	A haunted maze
Egypt	Puerto de Alejandría (Alexandría's Port)	A boat ride from Egypt to Iberia
Egypt	Infinnito	A 100-metre observation tower built by Intamin in 2007
Rome	~~Magnus Colossus~~	A wooden roller coaster built by the Roller Coaster Corporation of America with a double drop. It's 36 metres high and reaches a speed of 92 km/h. The roller coaster is 1,252 meters long.: It closed in 2015 due to structural issues and high maintenance costs.
Rome	El Vuelo del Fénix (The Flight of the Phoenix)	A 60-metre drop tower built by Intamin and themed to the legend of the phoenix
Rome	Inferno	A ZacSpin Coster designed by Intamin. It is 25 metres height and flies at 60 km/h producing 3 g forces for a brief but exciting moment.
Rome	Ayquesustus	A children's drop tower
Rome	Rontundus	A children's Ferris wheel with dove-shaped gondolas
Rome	Serpentinum	An attraction where children can pull a lever in carts pulled by geese
Rome	Tentáculus	An attraction where children can go up, down, and sideways in vehicles in the form of torches chaired by the Imperial Roman Eagle
Rome	Torbellinus	A children's swing ride
Rome	Vertigum	A children's attraction in the form of a gondola mouse which rises and rotates in a circular motion
The Islands	La Cólera de Akiles (The Anger of Akiles)	A 16-metre-high Supernova built by Mondial in 2006, previously located at Alton Towers
The Islands	Los Rápidos de Argos (Argos' Rapids)	A river rapids ride
The Islands	Mithos	A typical carousel ride with mythological creatures, such as mermaids, centaurs, sacred oxen and other creatures
The Islands	El Rescate de Ulises (Ulysses' Rescue)	A dark water ride with animatronics

=== Shows ===
Show	Description
Acuarela	Passage around Roma.
Anfitriones dem Mediterráneo (Hosts Mediterranean)	Meet at the park with ancient gods.
Animaciones Terroríficas (Terrifying Animals)	Humorous show.
Arqueólogos (Archaeologists)	Two archaeologists travel through Egypt crazy in your car full of surprises in search of new mysteries.
¡Baila con... las mascotas! (Dancing with... the mascots!)	Baba, mític and Cuca is a choreography of the most fun to get a big welcome.
Barbarroja (Red Beard)	Enter into a typical Mediterranean town and live the Captain Red Beard's attack with a real ship with 7 pirates, a town, a 20-metre cliff and a lot of special effects and surprises!
Danzas de Karnak (Dances Karnak)	Sinuous dance of the priestesses of Isis.
El Corazón de Samos (Samos' heart)	Dances from the center of the Mediterranean Sea.
El Encantador de Serpientes (The snake charmers)	A funny little man with his dancer and a snake, which tells his travels through India.
Lucha de Gladiadores (Gladiator's Fight)	In the Roman square, in front of the Circus Màximus, enjoy a battle between the most important Gladiator Schools of Rome.
Mític y Baba (Mític and Baba)	Interaction with pets in the park.
QueenWater	Multimedia evening with fountains, fireworks, laser. This show is only in high season.
Rock'n'Roma	Mobile Disco on the square of the Roman empire.
Tarantela	Inside the Circus Màximus, you'll see a fantastic history about a stupid clown who finds the Circus Maximus' God and who takes part in a special party inside the Roman theatre. Don't miss this show!
Teatro de Títeres (Puppet theater)	Currently is represented by 'La Pócima Mágica (The Magic potion)'. A story for the youngest of the family.

== Calendar and admission ==
Terra Mitica is open almost every day in June, July, August, and the first week of September from 10.30 am to 8 pm, 9 pm or 10.30 pm (closing time varies). It opens from 10.30 to 7 pm on some selected days in May, October and November. It remains closed to whole months of December to April.

In 2016, a single adult ticket costs €38. A two-day adult ticket is €48. An afternoon adult ticket is €25. There are discounted tickets for juniors (5–10 years old), seniors (60 years and older), and disabled people. Children 0–5 years enter free.

Season passes are also available: adult season pass - €80 (family: €70); season pass renewal: no reduction as of 2016. For family season passes a proof of family relationship is required.

== Incidents ==
On 7 July 2014, an Icelandic teenager was killed after his harness sprung open on Inferno. All other ZacSpin across the world ceased operations pending investigation findings from Terra Mítica and later reopened.
