= Riptide (Canada's Wonderland) =

Thrill ride at Canada's Wonderland

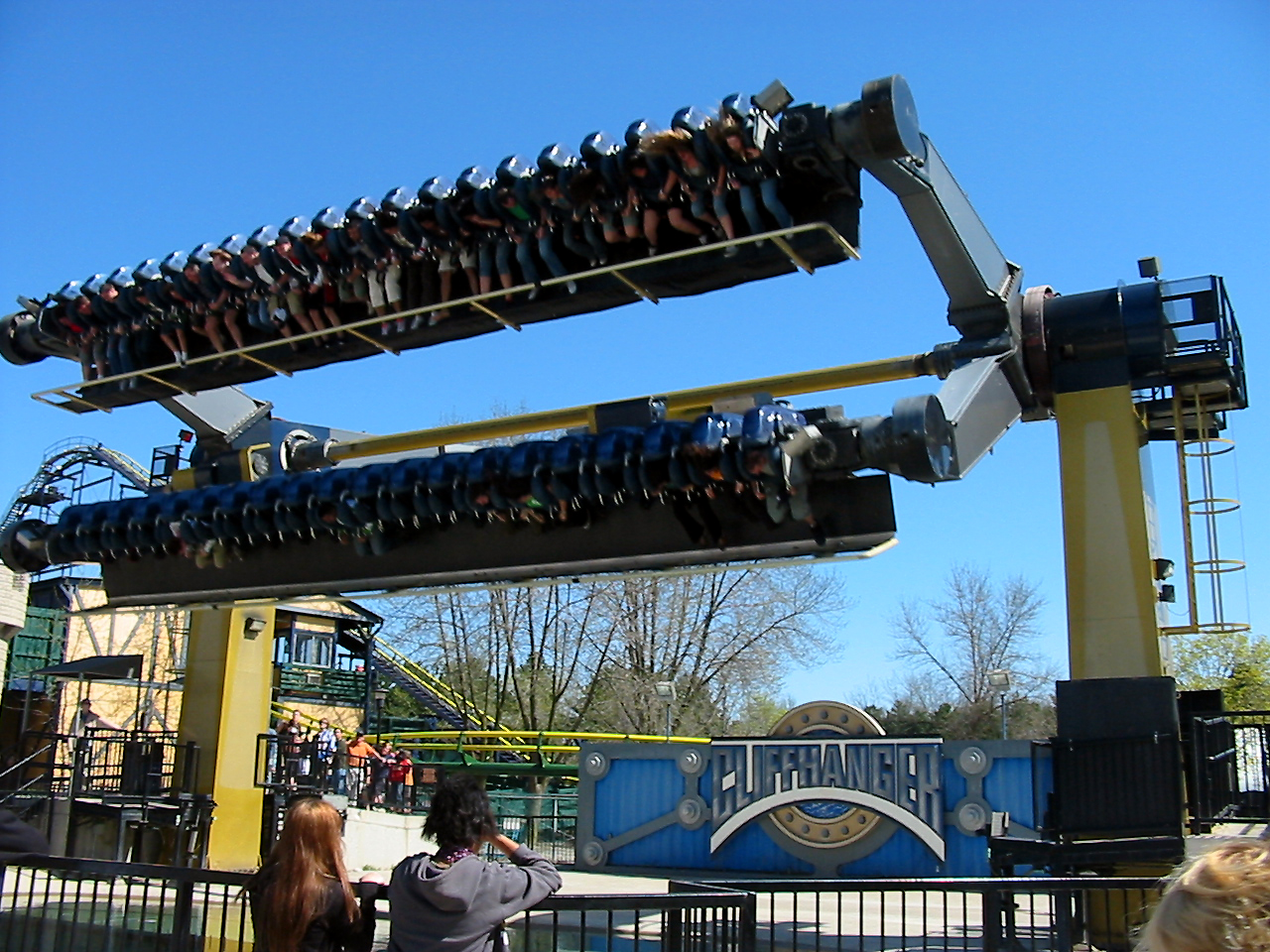
- Riptide, in 2007. The ride was still known Cliffhanger this season.

Canada's Wonderland
- Area: Medieval Faire
- Coordinates: 43°50′39.04″N 79°32′25.80″W
- Status: Operating
- Opening date: August 2000

Ride statistics
- Manufacturer: Mondial
- Model: Splash over top spin
- Capacity: When both levels open, approximately 800 riders per hour
- Rows: 2
- Riders per row: 20
- Duration: Approximately 2 minutes
- Height restriction: 137–203 cm (4 ft 6 in – 6 ft 8 in)
- Fast Lane available

Riptide (formerly called Cliffhanger) is a thrill ride at Canada's Wonderland manufactured by Mondial. The ride is similar to the park's Shockwave ride in terms of how the riders are spun. At the base of the ride there are a number of fountains that (only during hot days) shoot up towards the riders as they are spinning and soak them. When the weather is cool, the fountains shoot up but go back down before the water hit the riders. Over the past couple of years, the ride cycle has been cut down and riders don't get as wet as they did in the past. Unlike the 'Topspins' made by Huss which feature one gondola (or row), Riptide features two gondolas.

== History ==
When the ride first opened in August 2000, its name was Cliffhanger. It also had longer cycles meaning that riders got hit with the water more often than riders do today. In 2007, when Cedar Fair announced that they had purchased all the Paramount Parks in North America, the ride name was changed to what it is called today, Riptide. For reasons unknown, Cedar Fair cut down the ride cycle slightly, when they took over the park, meaning less passes through the water and less wetness for riders.

== Structure ==
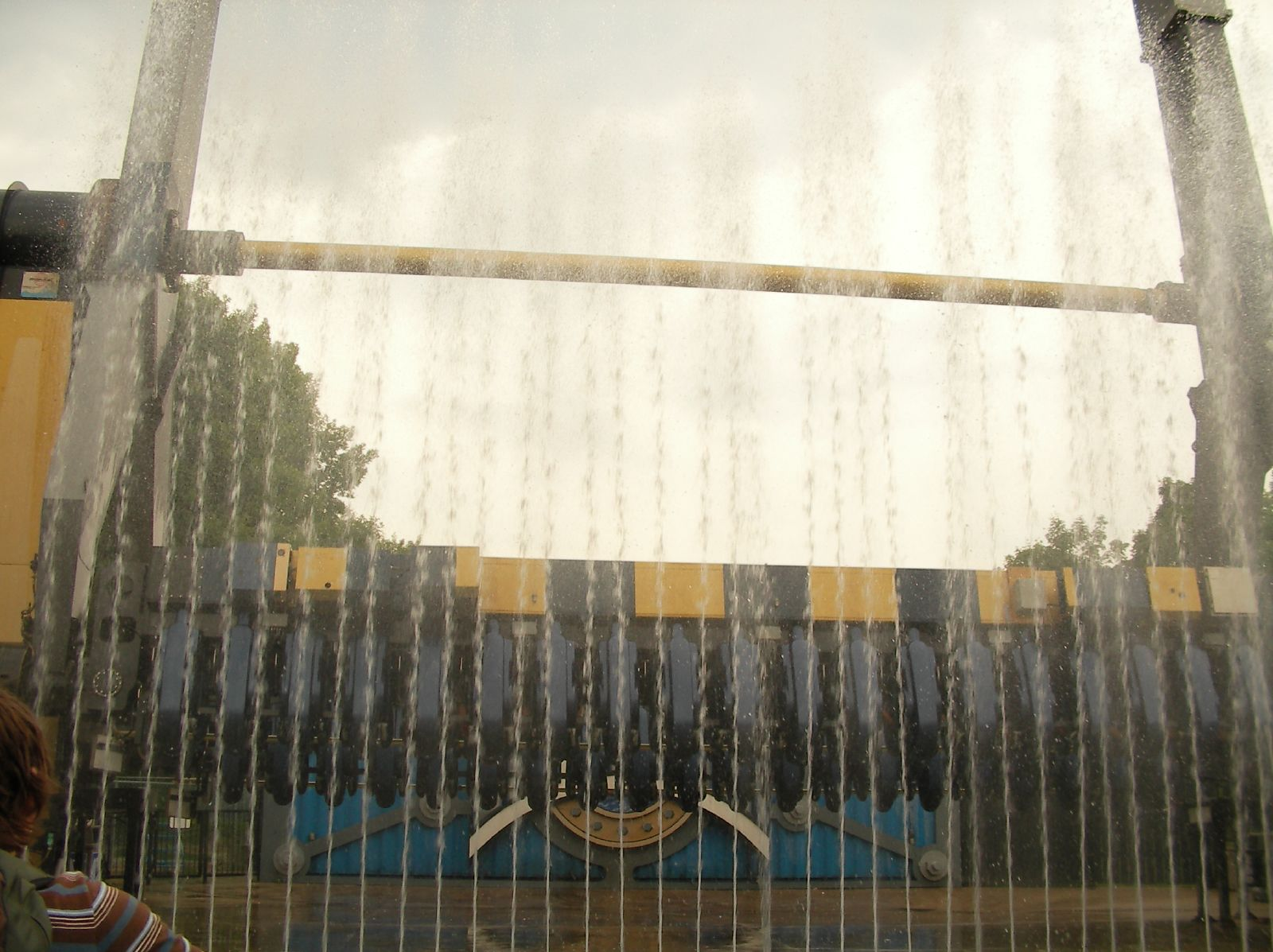
Water ejected from fountains at the bottom of the ride structure.

Riptide is mainly made up of 4 parts. The first parts are the two supports that hold the entire ride up. The second parts are the two arms that hold and move the gondolas up and down in a circular rotation. The third parts are the tow gondolas. This is where the riders are seated for the ride. Each gondola holds a maximum of 20 riders meaning that the ride can operate with a maximum of 40 riders per cycle. The gondolas also spin freely on a circular rotation just like the arms that hold the gondolas. The fourth parts are the fountains. The fountains at the bottom of the ride can shoot as high as the ride itself and are a part of the ride to soak riders while riding (only during hot days).

== Ride experience ==
Riptide in operation in August 2011

The following is what a rider can expect during the operation of the ride. There is no 'official' cycle for the ride, as operators can change the cycle and control the fountains as they please.

- Riders may go through the fountain (and get wet) two or three times.
- Riders will be spun around on the gondolas and (at some points of the ride) be rotated upside down (possibly into the fountains).
- Riders should expect the operator to tease riders by raising the fountain just below the front gondola but as the gondolas get closer, the fountain may go back down. (This may or may not happen.)

Some operators may perform a different cycle than the experience listed above. The experience listed above may not correspond to the operation of SOME cycles and the experience listed is what is most commonly used with the cycle of the ride.
