= Top Scan =

Amusement ride manufactured by Mondial

Top Scan is an amusement ride made by Mondial.

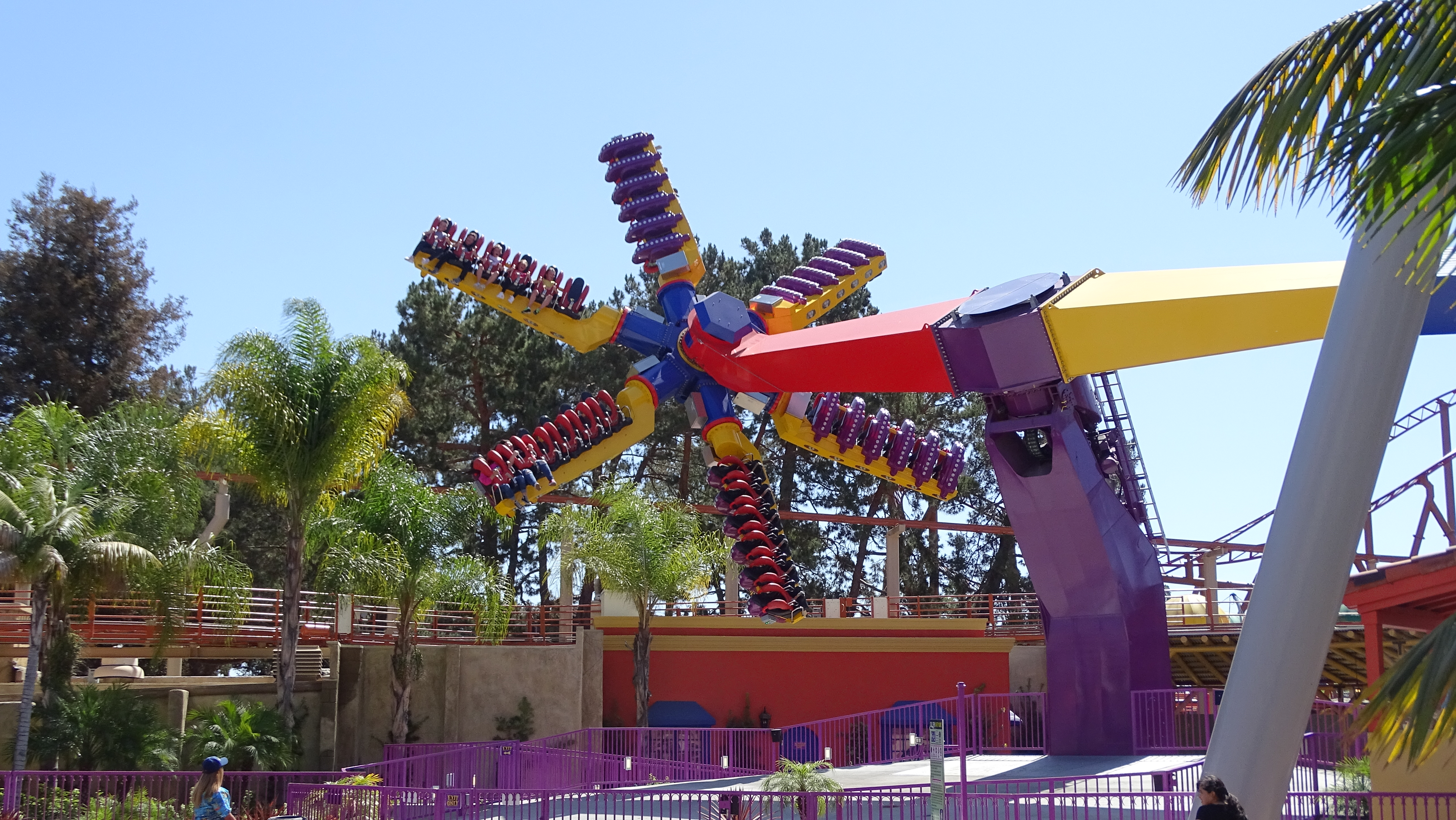
Sol Spin at Knott's Berry Farm holds 36 passengers whilst hurtling round 60 ft high

== Design and operation ==
The ride has six free-rotating gondolas each with five seats and the standard Mondial Triple-Lock Harnesses, including the belt. As the ride begins, the main support rises upwards slightly so it is not at ground level and cannot cause any risks during the ride, then the ride spins backwards and occasionally forwards then the main arm starts spinning with the gondolas freely tilting upside-down. Top Scan is available as a portable or park model.

A Top Scan successor was released in 2017 called Ventura, this is a park-only model and has 6 gondolas with 6 seats each giving a capacity of 36. The Top Scan also has 6 gondolas but only 5 seats per gondola giving a capacity of 30 seats.

== Incidents ==
In the summer of 2005, a woman was killed after being thrown from the ride at Adventureland (New York) when her harness gave way. In 2010, two women were stranded on the Space Roller at Miami-Dade County Fair and had to be rescued by a cherry picker when the machine stopped in the middle of a ride.

== Installations ==
There are several Mondial Top Scan locations throughout the world, including

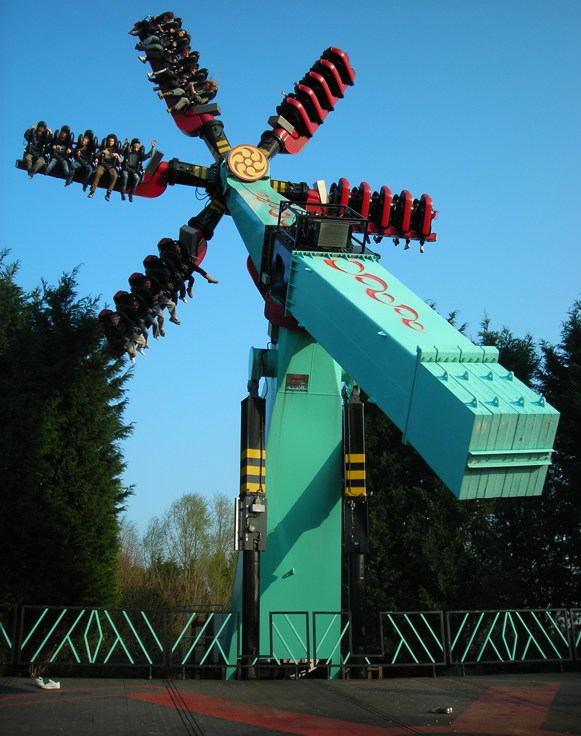
Samurai at Thorpe Park, at the highest point in its cycle

| Name | Park | Location | Opened | Status |
|---|---|---|---|---|
| Let's Twist | Everland | South Korea | 2008 | Operating |
| Samurai | Lagoon | United States | 2000 | Operating |
| The Beast (Beware) | Fantasy Island | United Kingdom | 2001 | Removed |
| Shockwave | Canada's Wonderland | Canada | 2001 | Operating |
| Samurai | Thorpe Park; Chessington World of Adventures | United Kingdom | 2003; 1999 to 2003 | Operating |
| Top Scan | Adventureland | United States | 2003 | Removed |
| Extreme | Gröna Lund | Sweden | 2007 | Removed |
| Whirlwind | Happy Valley Shanghai | China | 2009 | Operating |
| Whirlwind | Lightwater Valley | United Kingdom | 2010 | Removed |
| Magic Wind Mill | Happy Valley Wuhan | China | 2012 | Operating |
| Electro Spin | Carowinds | United States | 2017 | Operating |
| Sol Spin | Knott's Berry Farm | United States | 2017 | Operating |
| Wild Twister | Ocean Park Hong Kong | Hong Kong | 2019 | Operating |
| Xtreme | Barry Island Pleasure Park | United Kingdom | 2020 | Operating |
| Top Scan | Coney Beach Pleasure Park | United Kingdom | 2021 | Removed |
