= Saw – The Ride =

Steel Euro Fighter roller coaster

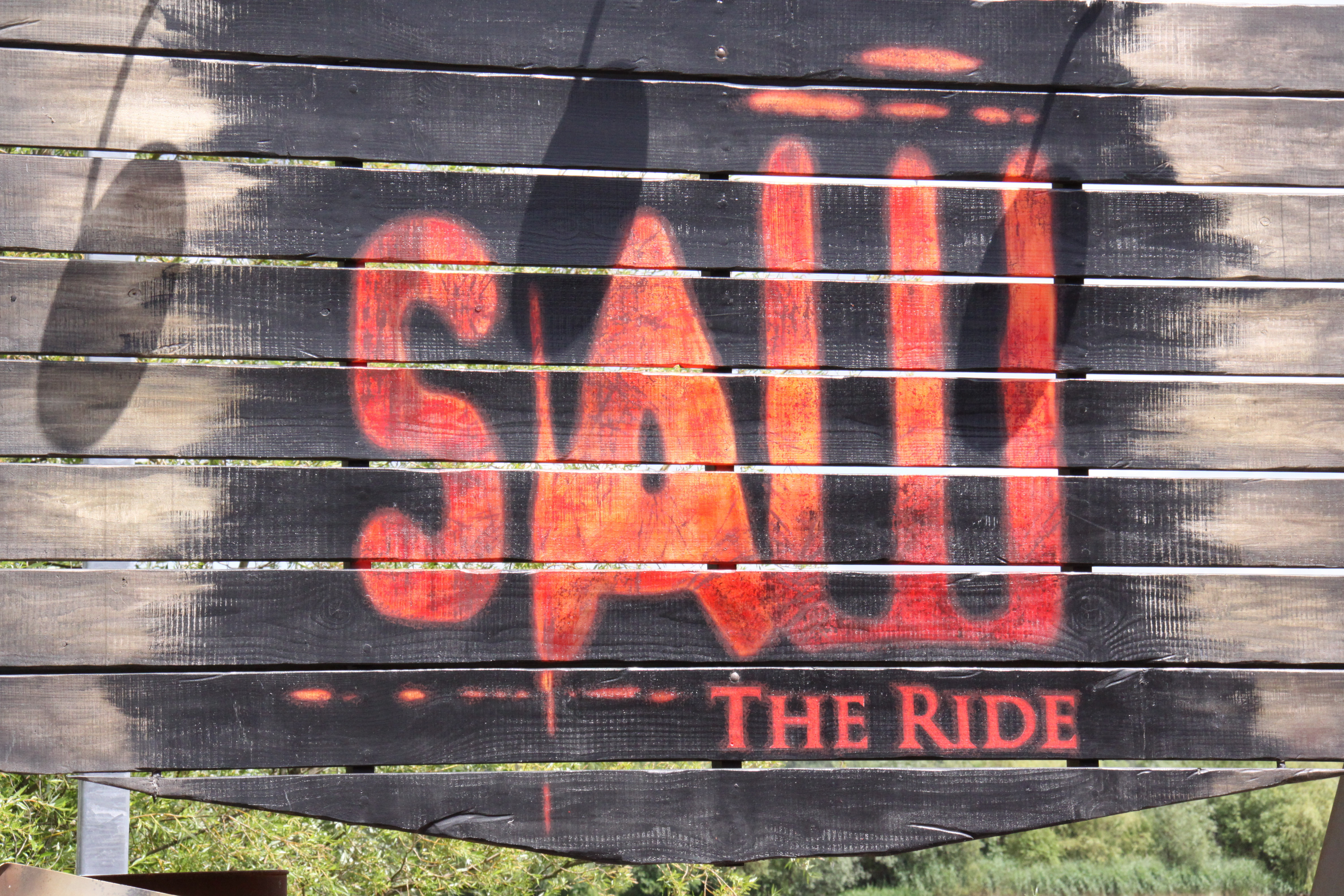

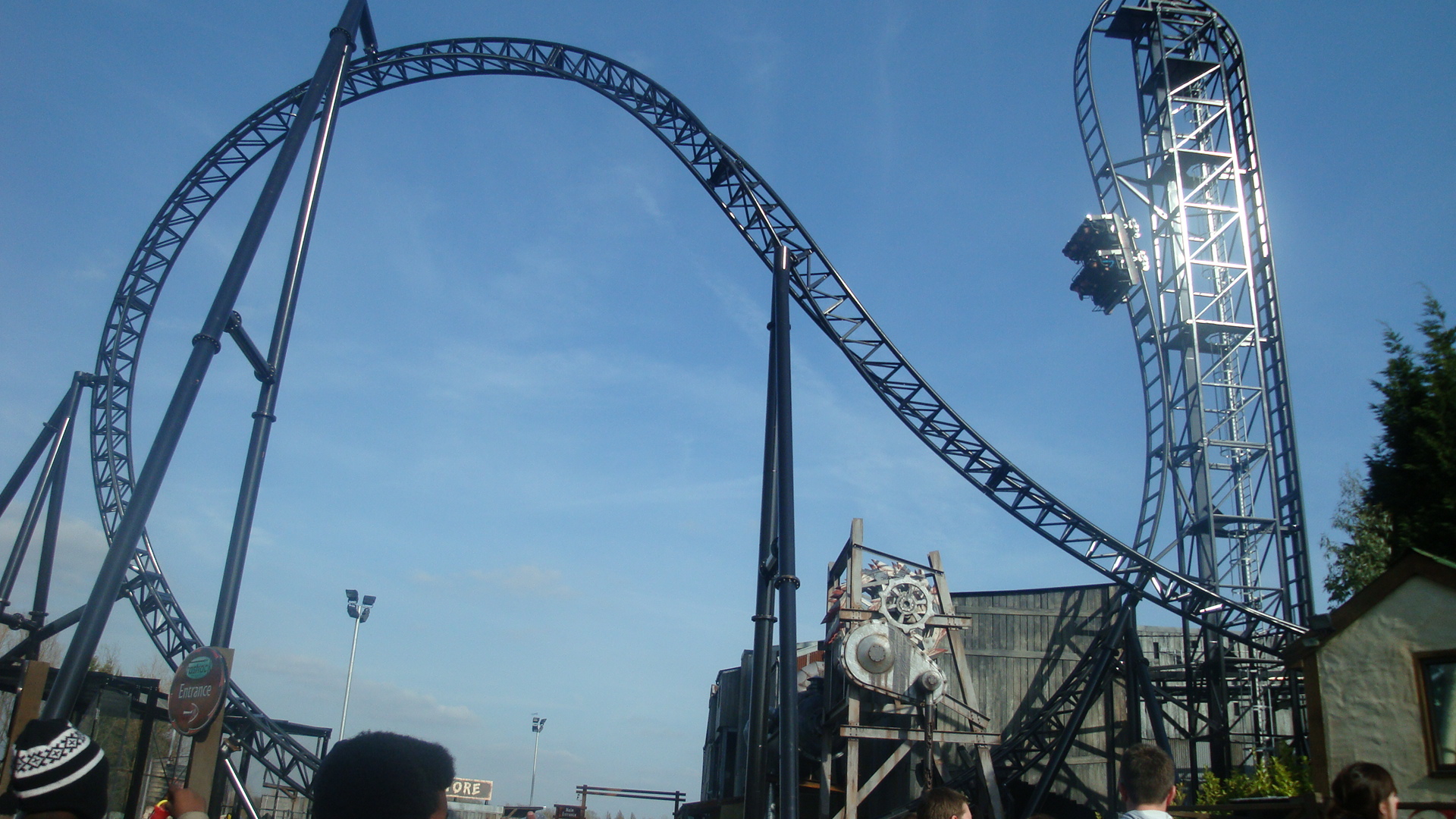
- The 100 degree drop and Immelmann Loop

Thorpe Park
- Location: Thorpe Park
- Coordinates: 51.402623°N 0.511905°W
- Status: Operating
- Opening date: 14 March 2009
- Cost: £13.5 million

General statistics
- Type: Steel – Euro-Fighter
- Manufacturer: Gerstlauer
- Model: Eurofighter
- Track layout: Custom
- Lift/launch system: Vertical chain lift hill
- Height: 100 ft (30 m)
- Length: 2,362 ft (720 m)
- Speed: 55 mph (89 km/h)
- Inversions: 3
- Duration: 1:40
- Max vertical angle: 100°
- Height restriction: 140 cm (4 ft 7 in)
- Trains: 8 trains with a single car; riders arranged 4 across in 2 rows for a total of 8 riders per train
- Theme: Saw franchise
- Website: Official website
- Fastrack available
- Single rider line available
- Wheelchair accessible
- Saw – The Ride at RCDB

Saw – The Ride is a steel roller coaster located at Thorpe Park in Surrey, England. Manufactured by Gerstlauer, the ride is a Euro-Fighter model that opened to the public on 14 March 2009. At the time of its debut, it was promoted as the steepest freefall drop roller coaster in the world, featuring a 100-degree drop. The attraction is themed around the Saw film franchise, incorporating an enclosed dark section and a highly immersive queue area that references scenes, traps, and props from the films and related media.

== History ==
Thorpe Park announced plans for a new roller coaster on 14 October 2008. A dedicated website was created for the new ride, claiming it would be "the scariest ride in the world." The official press release detailing the park's fourth major roller coaster confirmed a development partnership with Lionsgate and Twisted Pictures, and it claimed Saw would feature "the steepest freefall drop in the world." The press release also revealed that "the world's first ever horror movie-themed rollercoaster" would be marketed under the slogan "Face your Fears."

When SAW - The Ride opened, it was not the steepest rollercoaster in the world - Steel Hawg at Indiana Beach had opened the previous year with a steeper 111° drop. However, unlike Steel Hawg's 111° drop, SAW's 100° drop does not have any trim brakes on it. Hence, as the drop was 'free' (not constrained by brakes), it was marketed specifically as having 'the world's steepest freefall drop'. This particular accolade was overtaken by The Monster in 2016.

During construction, the codename "Project Dylan" was used to keep the movie tie-in secret, named after a member of the development team's cat. A section of the Canada Creek Railway had to be rebuilt, affecting a small section of the Samurai queue. Competition winners and annual pass holders were allowed to attend a preview event before it opened to the public on 14 March 2009.

In 2019, to mark the 10th anniversary of the ride, the entrance sign was repainted and live actors were temporarily reintroduced as part of the attraction's theming.

A Ford Crown Victoria Police Interceptor is displayed next to the ride.

== Ride experience ==
Track layout

The ride station and dark section are set in a building made to resemble an abandoned industrial sawmill.

The ride typically dispatches two cars in quick succession, with a digital countdown timer visible to riders at the start of the experience. The first car passes an initial encounter with Billy the Puppet, who laughs as it moves through. The second car is briefly halted while Billy delivers a short monologue outlining the experience ahead; this pause also serves to conceal a block section, ensuring safe spacing between vehicles. The car then advances toward two dimly lit, swinging pendulum blades that appear to close in before a sudden, near-vertical hidden drop. This creates the illusion of plunging directly into a pit of strobe-lit spikes, which are narrowly avoided. The vehicle enters a brake run, during which air blasts are directed at riders to simulate the firing of syringes from crossbows positioned to appear as though they narrowly miss riders' heads. Following another surprise drop, the car turns left into a bathroom scene, where it executes a heartline roll above a screaming, heavily injured victim in a pool of blood—an explicit reference to a trap featured in the first Saw film. At this point, water is sprayed at riders to simulate blood. Exiting the warehouse section, the car enters another brake run before proceeding toward the 100-foot (30 m) vertical lift hill. Prior to engaging the lift, the car stops in front of two video screens and a further digital countdown timer. Billy appears on screen, accompanied by Jigsaw's voice delivering the line "Game over." The screens then switch off, Billy's laughter is heard, and a bell sounds as the lift hill engages and the car begins its ascent, gradually increasing in speed. At the summit, the car plunges into a 100-degree freefall drop, passing beneath large rotating blades styled to appear bloodstained. This is followed by an Immelmann loop, an overbanked turn, and an airtime hill. On-ride photographs are taken as the car rises into a brake run on the left. A sudden drop then leads into a dive loop, after which the ride concludes with a banked turn into the final brake run. The car turns right into the station for unloading, where Jigsaw's voice is heard congratulating riders on surviving and declaring that they are no longer ungrateful to be alive.

Riders were originally able to purchase a DVD recording of their ride experience, compiled from cameras mounted on the front and rear of each car. This feature was discontinued when the cameras were removed in 2012.

== Queue ==
The ride entrance is located at the rear of Saw Plaza. The exterior queue line is themed with mock razor-wire fencing and a variety of props designed to resemble torture devices featured in the Saw film series. Recorded walkie-talkie audio of panicked police officers plays within the building, while loud ambient music is broadcast throughout the queue area. The queue route winds around the back of the warehouse before entering the structure.

Inside, guests proceed through a dimly lit corridor featuring four shotguns suspended from the ceiling, which simulate firing approximately every 90 seconds to create a sudden jump effect. The corridor leads up a staircase passing a caged replica of the Rack trap from Saw III. Along the stairs, television monitors intermittently display Billy the Puppet, who explains the "rules" of the ride. Overhead, a body entangled in barbed wire—a reference to the original Saw film—is visible before the queue enters the station. Within the station area, mannequin body parts are mounted in small mechanical devices or suspended from the walls alongside Billy the Puppet on his tricycle, a prop taken from Saw Alive. Misted windows opposite the loading platform intermittently flash, and a digital countdown timer is displayed above the loading gates counting time between dispatches.

Upon completion of the ride, guests disembark and descend a separate stairway. Along the exit route, industrial fans mounted on the exterior wall of the warehouse are visible, and a short video featuring Billy plays at the base of the stairs. Additional themed props, including more mannequin body parts and a severed head on a weighing scale—referencing promotional imagery from Saw IV—are displayed overhead. Riders then exit the building, passing the Saw Store and photo booth.

== Closures ==
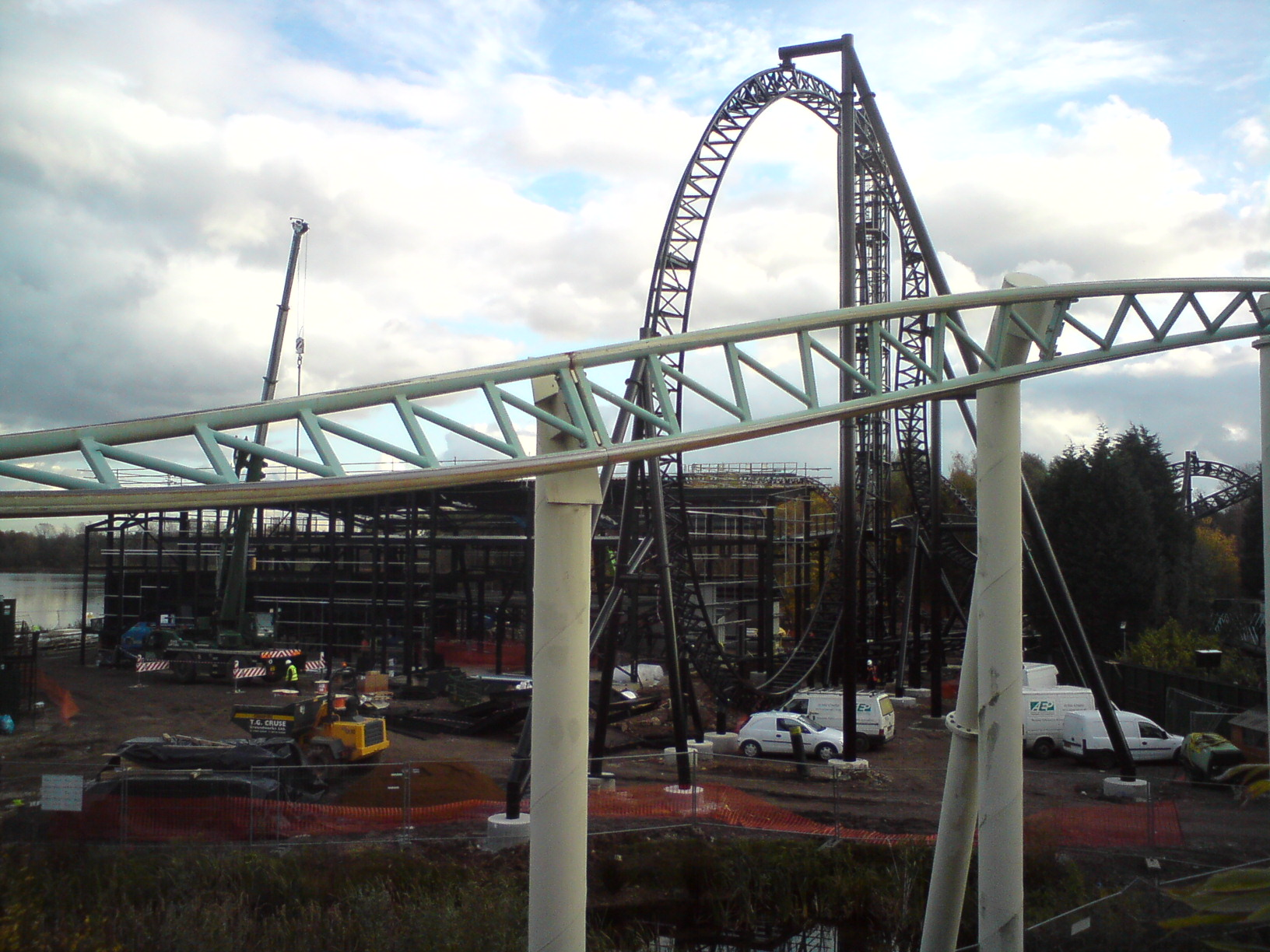
Saw – The Ride under construction on 28 October 2008

On 11 March 2009, the ride was scheduled to be officially launched with a group of invited celebrities, including Darren Lynn Bousman, director of Saw II, Saw III, and Saw IV, who later shared an account of his experience on Facebook. The ride encountered operational issues during the launch, including a delay, a barrier shutdown, and a subsequent stoppage, which park officials attributed to a computer programming error. An ambulance was called after a woman suffered a panic attack.

On 5 June 2015, following a serious accident on The Smiler roller coaster at Alton Towers, which left several passengers in critical condition, Merlin Entertainments temporarily closed Saw, along with two other roller coasters at Chessington World of Adventures. During the closure, safety protocols and operational procedures were reviewed. Saw subsequently reopened on 9 July 2015.

== Gallery ==
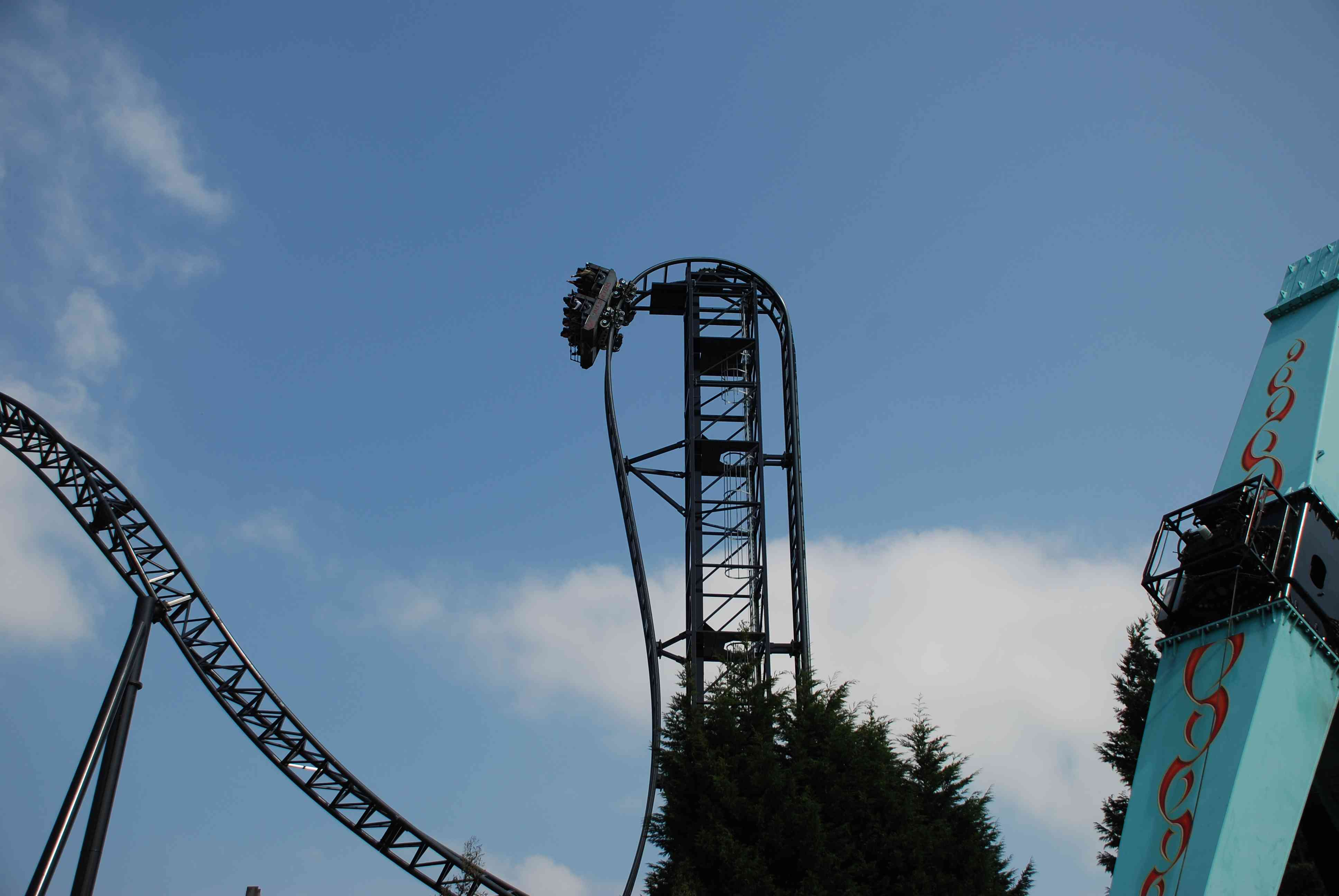
The 100° drop of Saw – The Ride

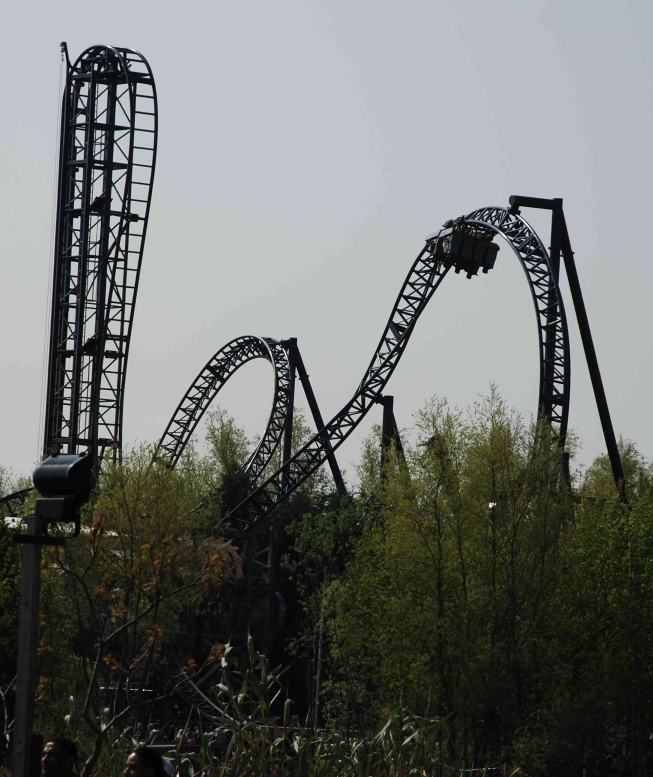
The first drop (left), Immelmann (right)

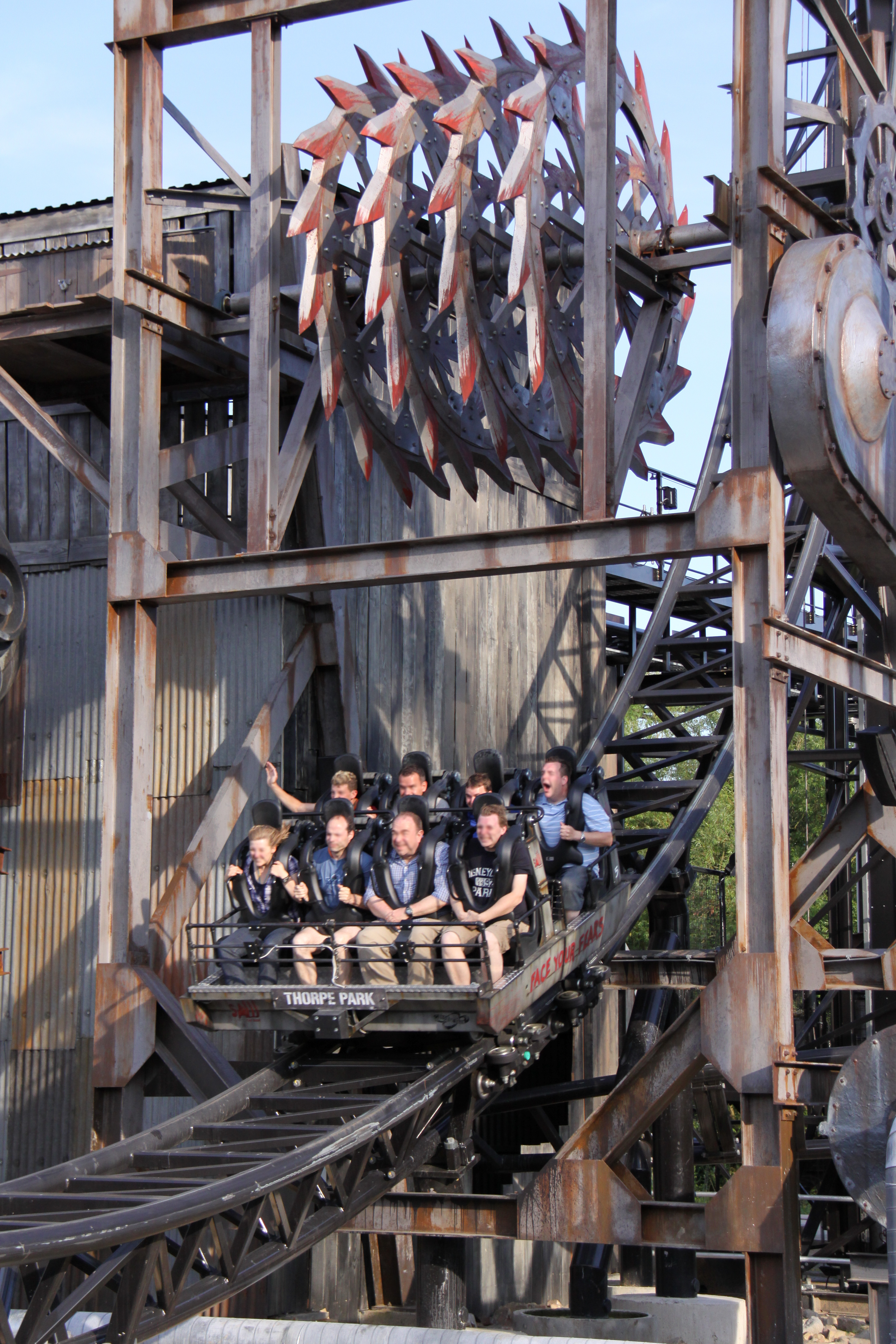
A car passes under the rotating blades.
