= Samurai (ride) =

Top Scan flat ride

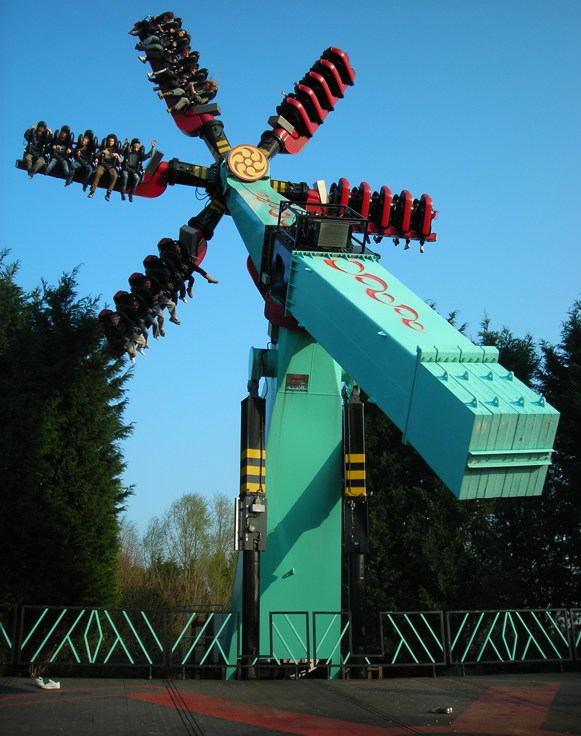
- Samurai, at highest point in cycle.

Thorpe Park
- Coordinates: 51°25′58.16″N 0°35′48.72″W
- Status: Operating
- Opening date: 2004
- Replaced: Calgary Stampede

Chessington World of Adventures
- Area: Mystic East
- Status: Relocated to Thorpe Park
- Opening date: 1999
- Closing date: 2003
- Replaced: Magic Carpet
- Replaced by: Peeking Heights

Ride statistics
- Attraction type: Top Scan
- Manufacturer: Mondial
- Height: 60 ft (18 m)
- G-force: +4g / -3g
- Capacity: 500 riders per hour
- Vehicles: 6
- Riders per vehicle: 5
- Duration: Approximately 2 minutes (Setting Dependant)
- Height restriction: 140 cm (4 ft 7 in)
- Fastrack available
- Single rider line available
- Wheelchair accessible
- Must transfer from wheelchair

Samurai is a Mondial Top Scan ride located at Thorpe Park in the United Kingdom. It operated at nearby Chessington World of Adventures between 1999 and 2003, and was transferred to Thorpe Park at the end of the 2003 season. It has operated at Thorpe Park since 2004. The song played on the ride is a modified version of "Burly Brawl", from the soundtrack of The Matrix Reloaded.

== Technical details ==
Ride Type: Mondial Top-Scan
Height: 60 ft (18 m)
Length: Approximately 2 minutes (Setting Dependent)
Height Restrictions: 1.4 m(55 in.)
On-Ride Photo: No
G-Force: +4g / -3g
Status: Operating
Capacity: 30 seats per ride, 400 riders per hour

== Samurai at Chessington ==
Samurai is a Top Scan ride from the Dutch company Mondial. The ride was originally installed at Chessington World Of Adventures in 1999 as part of the Mystic East section of the park, and replaced the original plan of installing a Huss Flic Flac on the site. The ride was the first of its kind in a UK amusement park, though a travelling version, "Top Buzz" debuted on the UK fair circuit the previous year.

Samurai stayed at Chessington until the end of the 2003 season when it was closed, dismantled and moved to Thorpe Park. Reasons for the ride's move are largely speculative. Most enthusiasts generally regard the decision to be part of Tussauds (the company which owned Thorpe Park and Chessington at the time) plans to change the target audience of both parks. Chessington was intended to become a more family orientated park and installations since the 2002 season have been in line with this policy. Similarly, Thorpe Park has moved towards attracting the 14-30 market and has installed thrill rides since this policy emerged.

Keen-eyed guests can still spot a reminder of Samurai at Chessington when they ride the Tiger Rock log flume - a theming item depicting a samurai warrior gripping the head of his decapitated foe, emerging disconcertingly from the undergrowth.

== Samurai at Thorpe Park ==
Samurai opened at Thorpe Park as the sole new ride for the 2004 season. It sits in the site which had been occupied by the Calgary Stampede ride. Some confusion emerged with regards to the location of this ride in relation to Thorpe Park's themed "lands". Calgary Stampede was a Canada Creek ride, yet Samurai was painted and themed to match the Lost City rides, similar to Vortex. This decision sparked discussion of a "three areas" system for Thorpe Park where the existing themed areas would be condensed into three larger themed areas, which would probably be the Lost City, Amity Cove and Calypso Quay areas of the park. Subsequent installations in Canada Creek seem to have dispelled this rumour. (As of 2016, Samurai has been listed as a ride in the Old Town area.)

Samurai's arrival at Thorpe Park met with mixed reactions. The move had been long discussed on fan sites but few saw it as more than a fantasy. When the move was announced, many fans were disappointed to see Chessington lose one of its best (if not the best) rides. There was further controversy when it emerged that Samurai was to retain its name at Thorpe Park, despite not fitting the style and theme of the area. There have also been suggestions that since its move to Thorpe Park it has been run on less intense settings and the use of manual control has been all but abandoned, to the disappointment of enthusiasts. Although during Fright Nights, the settings on Samurai were raised on some occasions, comparisons to other Top Scan rides around Europe, particularly on the travelling fair circuit, show that even at Chessington the ride was already running well below its maximum speed and intensity.

There were rumours that the Samurai was to be integrated into the Canada Creek area and re-themed for the opening of SAW: The Ride in 2009, however, this did not occur. Instead, the blue fences around the ride (seen in the above photo) were painted red to fit in better with the roller coaster. As well as this, the ride received a queue extension so that it could cope with the increased number of visitors in the area of the park.

The attraction was repainted in black and red for the 2025 season to align visually with the adjacent attraction, Saw - The Ride.
