= Mondial (amusement ride manufacturer) =

Amusement ride manufacturer

- Industry: Amusement ride manufacturing
- Founded: 1979
- Headquarters: Heerenveen, Friesland, Netherlands
- Website: www.mondialrides.com

Mondial is a Dutch company specialising in the manufacture of amusement rides.

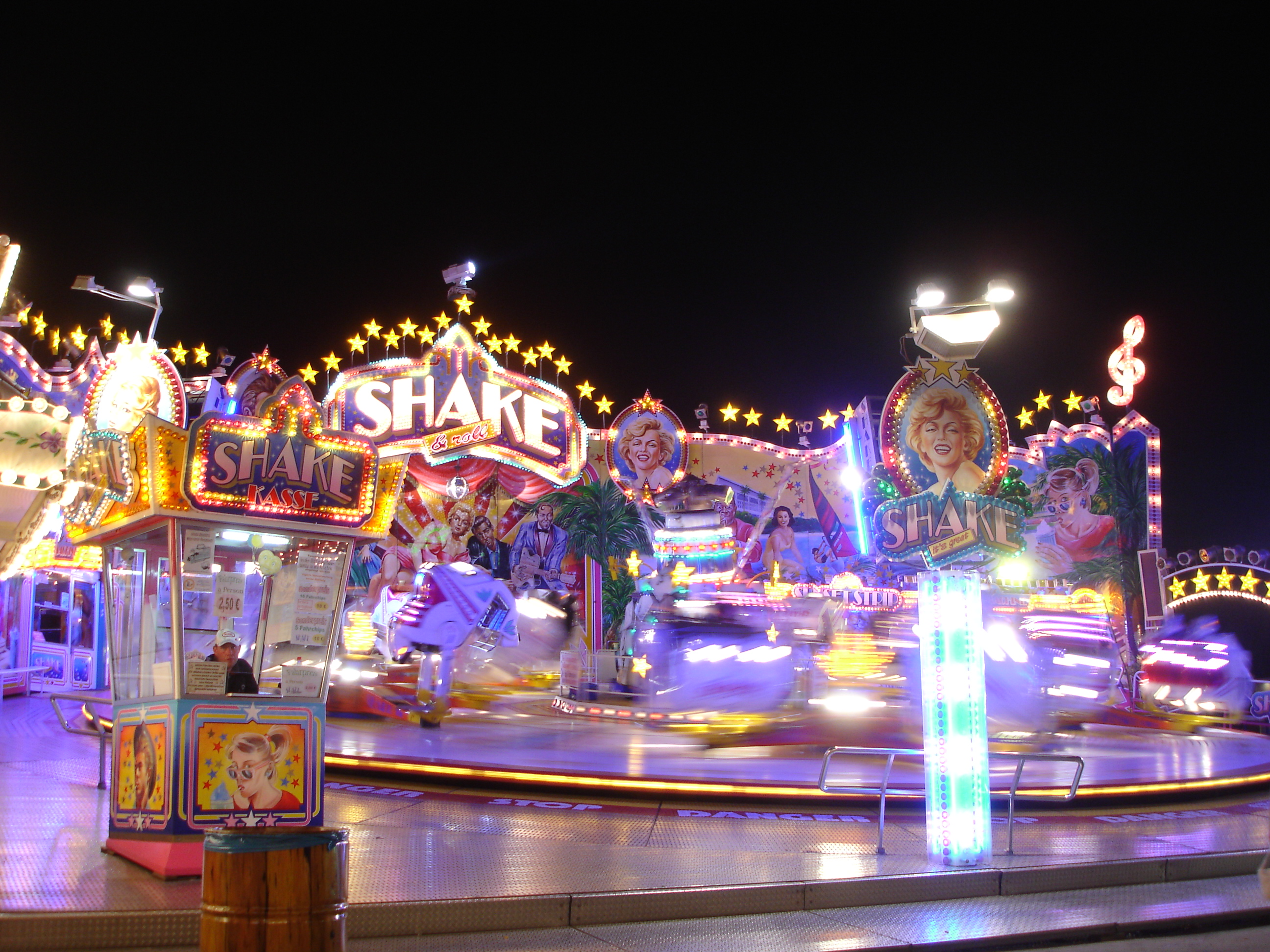
Shake

== Products ==
=== Giant Wheels ===
- RR 35
- RR 45
- RR 55

=== Park Rides ===
- Avalanche
- Revolution
- Roll Over
- Splash Over
- Turbine (park model)
- Ultra Max
- Ventura

=== Tower rides ===
- Observation Tower
- Sky Riser
- Sky Seeker
- WindSeeker

=== Transportable ===
- Capriolo 8
- Capriolo 10
- Diablo
- Furioso
- Heart Breaker
- Inferno
- Jet Force
- Mistral
- Roll Over
- Shake
- Super Nova
- Swinger
- Top Scan
- Tornado
- Turbine

=== Concepts ===
- Aductis
- Airstrike
- Blender
- Drifter
- Escape
- Surf's Up
- Wild Romance
- Propellor

== Ride Installations ==
List of Mondial attractions
Name	Model	Location	Country	Opened	Status	Ref
Air Maxx	Swinger	Prater; Rieger showman	Austria	2019; 1999-2018	Operating	
Bat Flyer	Super Nova	Selva Mágica	Mexico	1990s	Operating	
Big Wheel	Giant Wheel	Central Pier, Blackpool	(United Kingdom) UK	1990	Operating	
Catwoman's Whip	Shake	Six Flags New Orleans; Gotemba Thrill Valley	(United States) USA	2003-2005; 1995-2002	Closed	
Cliffhanger	Splash Over	Lagoon	(United States) USA	2001	closed	
Cólera de Akiles; Formerly Boneshaker & Energizer	Super Nova	Terra Mítica; Alton Towers	Spain	2006; 1995-2003	Operating	
Démon; Formerly RollOver	Top Spin	La Ronde; Tusenfryd; Leon Snep; Ahrend; Bausch	Canada	2014; 2004-2007; 2002; 2000-2001; 1995-1997	Operating	
Delirium	Revolution	Kings Dominion	(United States) USA	2016	Operating	
Electro Spin	Top Scan	Carowinds	(United States) USA	2017	Operating	
Extreme	Top Scan	Furuviksparken; Gröna Lund	Sweden	2013; 1999-2012	Operating	
Grand Canyon	Super Nova	Superland	Israel	1998	Operating	
Hurricane	Super Nova	Särkänniemi	Sweden	1991-2018	Removed	
Let's Twist	Top Scan	Everland	South Korea	2008	Operating	
Perfect Storm	Splash Over	Happy Valley Shanghai	China	2009-2020	Removed	
Psyclone	Revolution	Canada's Wonderland	Canada	2002	Operating	
Riptide; Formerly Cliffhanger	Splash Over	Canada's Wonderland	Canada	2000	Operating	
Samurai	Top Scan	Lagoon	(United States) USA	2000	Operating	
Samurai	Top Scan	Thorpe Park; Chessington World of Adventures	(United Kingdom) UK	2004; 1999-2003	Operating	
Shockwave	Top Scan	Canada's Wonderland	Canada	2001	Operating	
Speed Wave	Top Scan	Prater; Global Village; Brean Leisure Park; Flamingo Park; Joly Fam showmen (France)	Austria	2017; 2014-2016; 2013-2014; 2009-2013; 2005-2008	Operating	
Soaring Timbers; Formerly Night Fly	Inferno	Canada's Wonderland; Lainez; Biosseau; Rosai (Munich); Kaiser (Munich)	Canada	2017; 2014-2015; 2004-2013; 1999-2004; 1995-1998	Operating	
Sol Spin	Ventura	Knott's Berry Farm	(United States) USA	2017	Operating	
SteelHawk; Formerly Windseeker	Windseeker	Worlds of Fun; Knott's Berry Farm	(United States) USA	2014; 2011-2012	Operating	
Storm Chaser	Windseeker	Adventureland	(United States) USA	2014	Operating	
Surf Dance	Super Nova	Star City; Adventureland New York; Schäfer showman (Germany)	Philippines	2007; 1993-2006; 1991-1992	Operating	
Synkope	Revolution	Terra Mítica	Spain	2004	Operating	
The Flash	Ultra Max	Ocean Park Hong Kong	Hong Kong	2011	Operating	
Tik Tak	Shake R5	Tivoli Gardens	Denmark	2018	Operating	
Tomahawk	Shake	Fort Fun Abenteuerland; Rieger showmen	Germany	1999-2012; 1992-1998	Removed	
Tundra Twister	Avalanche	Canada's Wonderland	Canada	2023	Operating	
WindSeeker	Windseeker	Canada's Wonderland	Canada	2011	Operating	
WindSeeker	Windseeker	Cedar Point	(United States) USA	2011	Operating	
WindSeeker	Windseeker	Kings Island	(United States) USA	2011	Operating	
WindSeeker	Windseeker	Kings Dominion	(United States) USA	2012	Operating	
WindSeeker	Windseeker	Carowinds	(United States) USA	2012	Operating	
Wild Twister	Ventura	Ocean Park Hong Kong	Hong Kong	2019	Operating	
