= WindSeeker =

Swing ride at several Six Flags parks

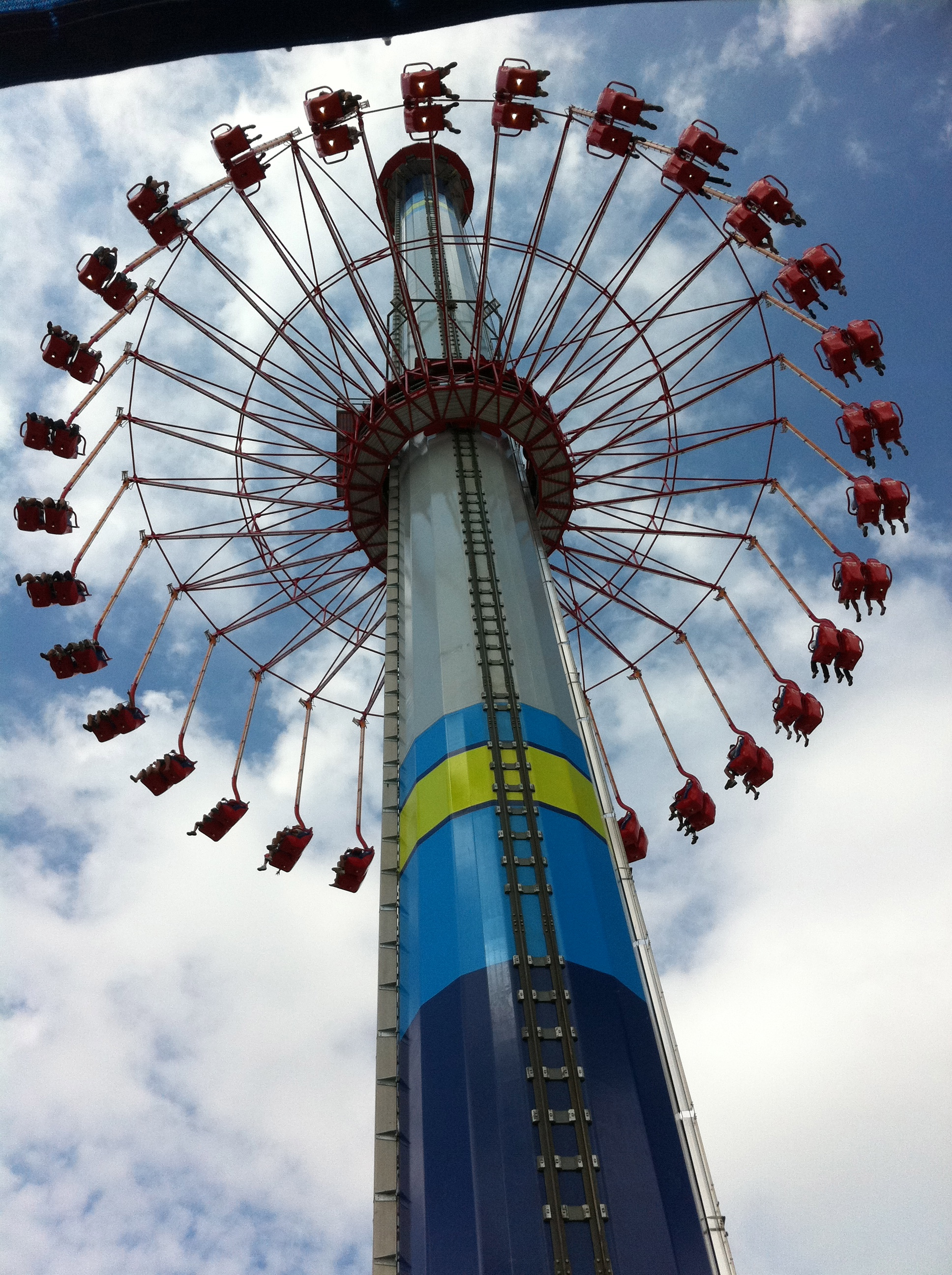
- WindSeeker at Cedar Point

Canada's Wonderland
- Area: Action Zone
- Coordinates: 43°50′26.40″N 79°32′32.89″W
- Status: Operating
- Cost: US$5 million
- Opening date: May 24, 2011
- Replaced: Jet Scream

Carowinds
- Area: Crossroads
- Coordinates: 35°06′7.60″N 80°56′28.85″W
- Status: Operating
- Cost: $6.5 million
- Soft opening date: March 30, 2012
- Opening date: March 31, 2012

Cedar Point
- Area: The Boardwalk
- Coordinates: 41°28′57.99″N 82°40′50.35″W
- Status: Operating
- Cost: $5 million
- Opening date: June 14, 2011
- Replaced: Ocean Motion

Kings Dominion
- Area: Candy Apple Grove
- Coordinates: 37°50′13.98″N 77°26′47.02″W
- Status: Operating
- Cost: $6.5 million
- Opening date: April 6, 2012
- Replaced: El Dorado; Hypersonic XLC

Kings Island
- Area: Coney Mall
- Coordinates: 39°20′26.62″N 84°15′49.83″W
- Status: Operating
- Cost: $5 million
- Opening date: June 21, 2011

Knott's Berry Farm
- Area: Fiesta Village
- Status: Relocated To Worlds of Fun
- Cost: $5 million
- Opening date: Mid-August 2011
- Closing date: September 19, 2012
- Replaced: Fiesta BBQ (Restaurant)
- Replaced by: Sol Spin

Worlds of Fun
- Area: Americana
- Coordinates: 39°10′27.27″N 94°29′21.25″W
- Status: Operating
- Opening date: 2014

Ride statistics
- Attraction type: Tower swinger
- Manufacturer: Mondial
- Model: Wind Seeker
- Height: 324 or 301 ft (99 or 92 m)
- Speed: 30 mph (48 km/h)
- G-force: 1.5
- Capacity: 960 riders per hour
- Vehicles: 32
- Riders per vehicle: 2
- Duration: 3 minutes
- Height restriction: 52 in (132 cm)
- Fast Lane available at all parks

WindSeeker is a 301-foot-tall (92 m) swing ride at several Six Flags parks and one Enchanted Parks. The rides are Wind Seeker models manufactured by Mondial. They opened for the 2011 season at Canada's Wonderland in Ontario, Cedar Point and Kings Island in Ohio, and Knott's Berry Farm in California. Carowinds in North Carolina and Kings Dominion in Virginia opened their WindSeekers in 2012. The first four each cost US$5 million, while the remaining two each cost $6.5 million. Cedar Fair (now Six Flags) relocated the Knott's Berry Farm WindSeeker to Worlds of Fun in 2014, where it reopened as SteelHawk.

The three-minute ride features 32 suspended twin seats – 64 seats total – spinning around a central tower. A lighting package was installed on all four WindSeekers, consisting of LED light strips mounted on the arms that support the swings and, with the exception of SteelHawk,) colored floodlights to illuminate towers from above.

WindSeeker at Canada's Wonderland was the first of the four parks to open on May 24, 2011. Problems soon after the ride opened led to a closure for repairs; it reopened several weeks later. The second WindSeeker opened to the public at Cedar Point on June 14, 2011, followed by the third at Kings Island on June 21, 2011, and the fourth at Knott's Berry Farm in August 2011. The following season, the fifth WindSeeker opened at Carowinds' on March 31, 2012, along with the sixth at Kings Dominion on April 6, 2012.

On September 21, 2012, Cedar Fair announced the temporary closure of all WindSeekers in response to two incidents at Knott's Berry Farm. All the installations, excluding Knott's Berry Farm, later reopened. The Knott's Berry Farm installation remained closed and was eventually relocated to Worlds of Fun.

== History ==
On their Facebook pages throughout August 2010, several Cedar Fair amusement parks hinted frequently at a new ride to be opened in 2011. On August 24, 2010, Canada's Wonderland, Cedar Point, Kings Island, and Knott's Berry Farm all announced that they would be adding a Mondial WindSeeker, to open sometime in spring 2011.

Construction of the WindSeekers at Canada's Wonderland, Cedar Point, and Kings Island began in late October and early November 2010. To install them, Canada's Wonderland's Jet Scream ride was removed and Cedar Point's Ocean Motion was moved to the former Demon Drop site. Construction was scheduled to begin around the same time at Knott's Berry Farm, where the Sky Cabin observation tower was to be removed to make way for it. On January 7, 2011, however, it was announced that their WindSeeker would not replace Sky Cabin but instead be located in the Fiesta Village section of the park. Work began almost immediately after this announcement.

Kings Island's WindSeeker was originally scheduled to be the first to open, on April 30, 2011, but the opening was delayed because of bad weather and eventually took place on the morning of June 21, 2011. It was the first WindSeeker to use the Fast Lane program.

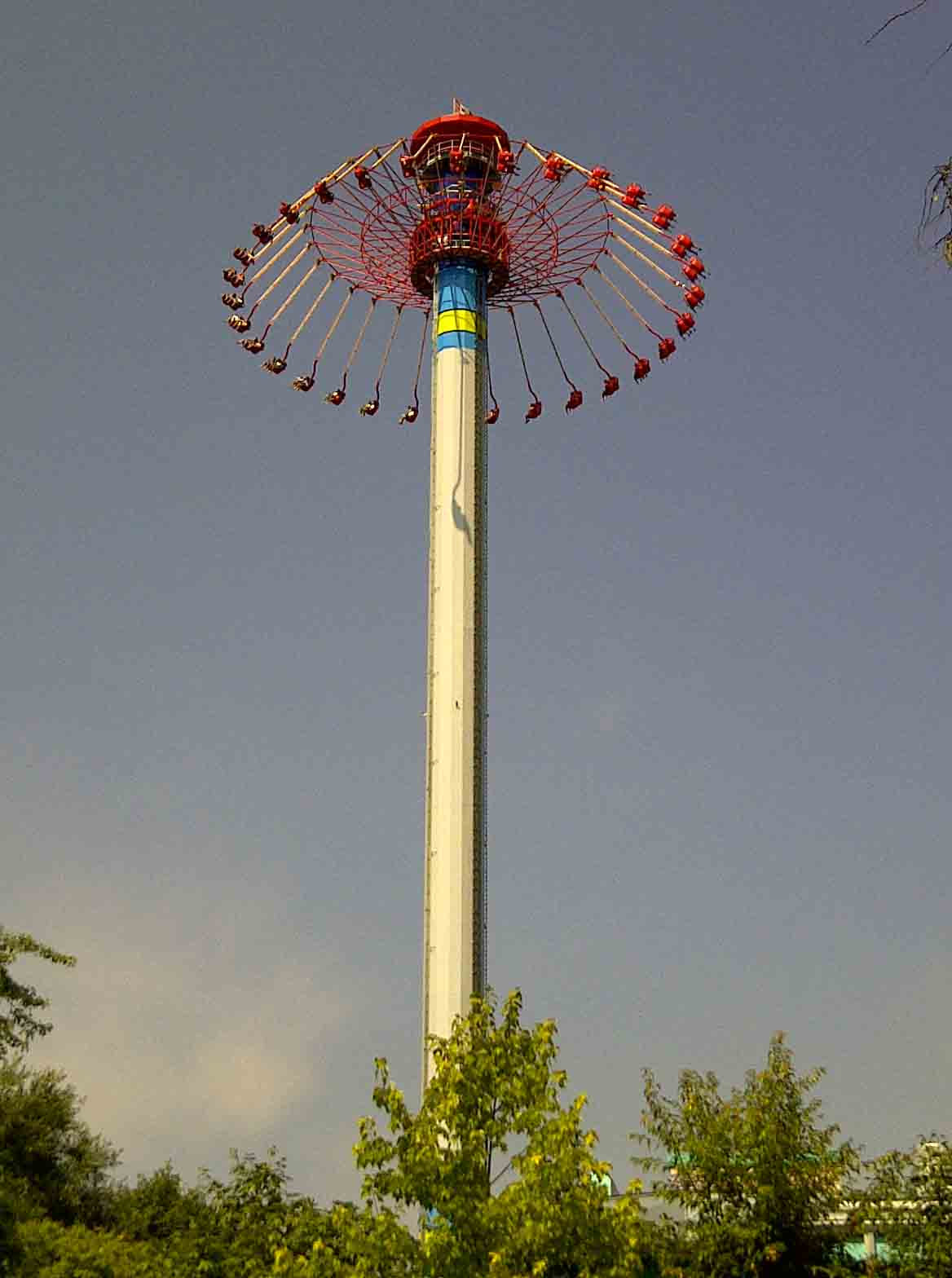
WindSeeker in operation at Canada's Wonderland.

The WindSeeker at Canada's Wonderland was originally scheduled to open on May 8, 2011, one week after that of Kings Island. On May 24, 2011, after problems were discovered during testing, Canada's Wonderland announced on their Facebook page that it would open to the public later that day, but it was quickly closed again when further mechanical problems were discovered. From May 24 to mid-June 2011, the ride was intermittently closed because of a variety of problems, most of which have since been resolved. At the beginning of October 2011, the hydraulic dampers used on the Knott's Berry Farm model were added to reduce the amount of swing movement even more.

Cedar Point's WindSeeker was originally scheduled to open on May 14, 2011, two weeks after that of Kings Island. After almost a month delays in construction and testing due to bad weather, it opened on June 14, 2011.

Before the decision to keep the Sky Cabin at Knott's Berry Farm and to place its WindSeeker elsewhere, their WindSeeker was to have the same color scheme as others. Also, instead of there being the red "UFO" on the top of the tower, original promotional materials show that a large purple "K" was to be placed on the top of the ride. The ride opened in mid-August 2011 after three months of delays. In late 2011, Fast Lane became available on the Knott's Berry Farm WindSeeker. On September 7, the ride stalled for nearly three hours, and on September 19, it stalled again at the top of the tower for three and a half hours. Both incidents prompted Cedar Fair to close all other WindSeekers until an internal investigation is completed. After the investigation was complete, all WindSeekers reopened except Knott's' model which was dismantled by December 11, 2013, to be sent to Worlds of Fun.

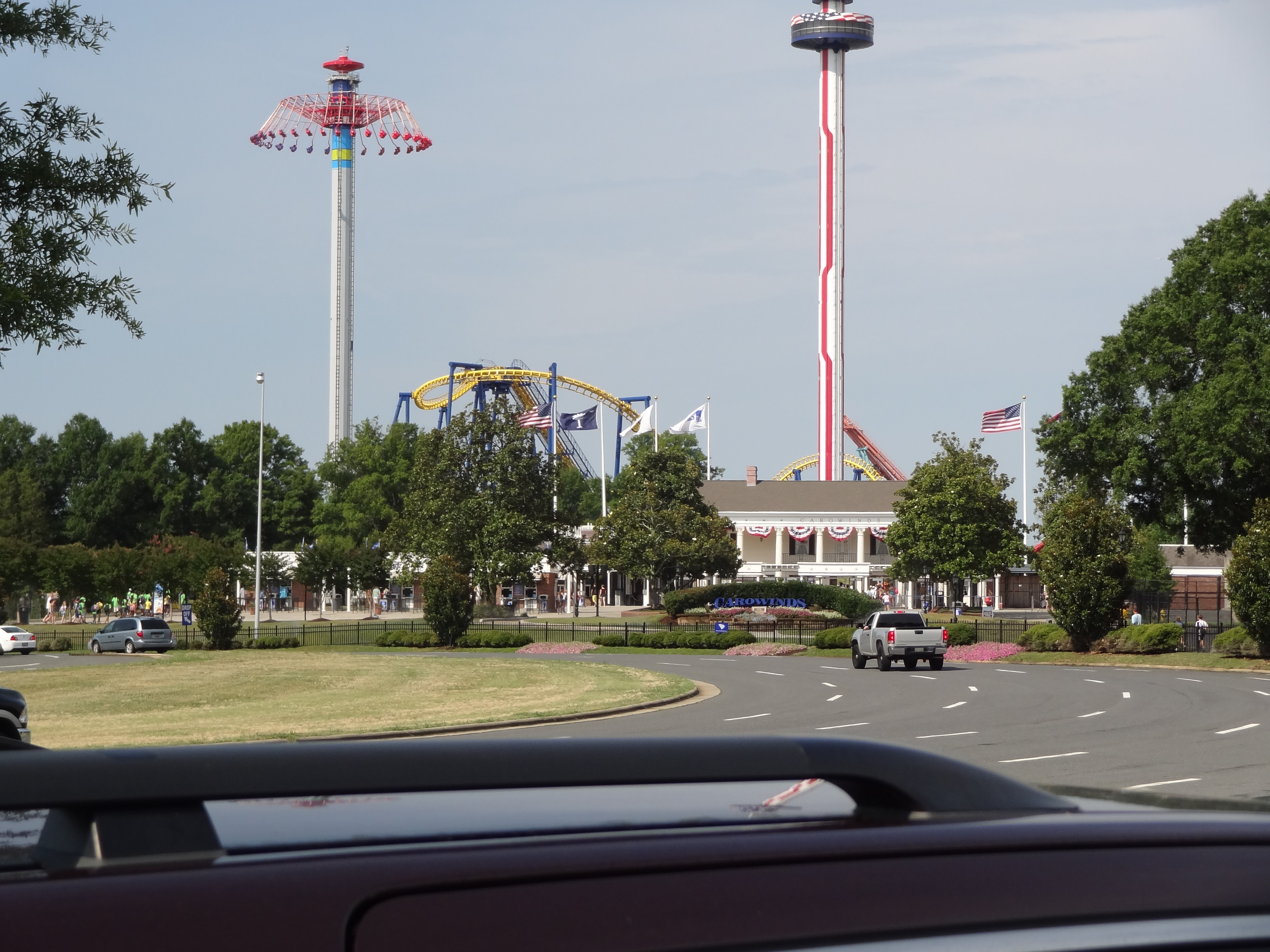
WindSeeker and Sky Tower at Carowinds

Throughout August 2011, the Carowinds web site had six different QR codes, each of which led the user to a website giving a clue as to what the 2012 attraction might be. When all six clues were put together, they made a picture that read "Voiceless it cries, wingless flutters, toothless bites, mouthless mutters, fun soars to new heights... August 24". On August 24, 2011, it was officially announced that Carowinds would receive the fifth WindSeeker, and on September 1, 2011, Kings Dominion officially announced that the sixth would open at the park in 2012. The WindSeekers at Carowinds and Kings Dominion have the same appearance as those at Canada's Wonderland, Cedar Point, and Kings Island and opened in 2012. Their construction started in early November 2011, after the parks closed for the season. At Carowinds, a section of the lake was filled near Nighthawk during construction to accommodate the ride's large footprint. At Kings Dominion, El Dorado was removed at the end of the 2011 season to make room for WindSeeker. Much like El Dorado, WindSeeker would sit in the same former spot as Hypersonic XLC. The first WindSeeker tower piece was installed there on January 20, 2012, and at Carowinds on January 23, 2012. Carowinds soft-opened their version on March 30, 2012, to media and invited guests; it opened to the public on March 31, 2012. Kings Dominion officially opened their model on April 6, 2012.

On August 30, 2013, Worlds of Fun announced that they would be adding SteelHawk, the relocated WindSeeker from Knott's Berry Farm.

== Structure ==
All six WindSeekers consist of the same parts in an identical structure. The 301-foot-tall (92 m) center tower is made up of eight parts. The base section is different from the other seven tower pieces because it supports the rest of the tower. On top of the eighth tower piece, there is a steel platform where workers and mechanics can observe the operation of the ride and perform maintenance. Above this platform is an element called the "red UFO" or the "Crown". The gondola itself has a number of parts. In the middle of the structure there are wheels that allow the swings to rotate as they go up and down the tower. The gondola is raised and lowered by cables linking the gondola structure to four sets of yellow wheels, each attached to a different section of the steel platform at the top of the tower. Hydraulic dampers that were not in the original design were added to all the WindSeeker installations to reduce the movement of the swings while in operation.

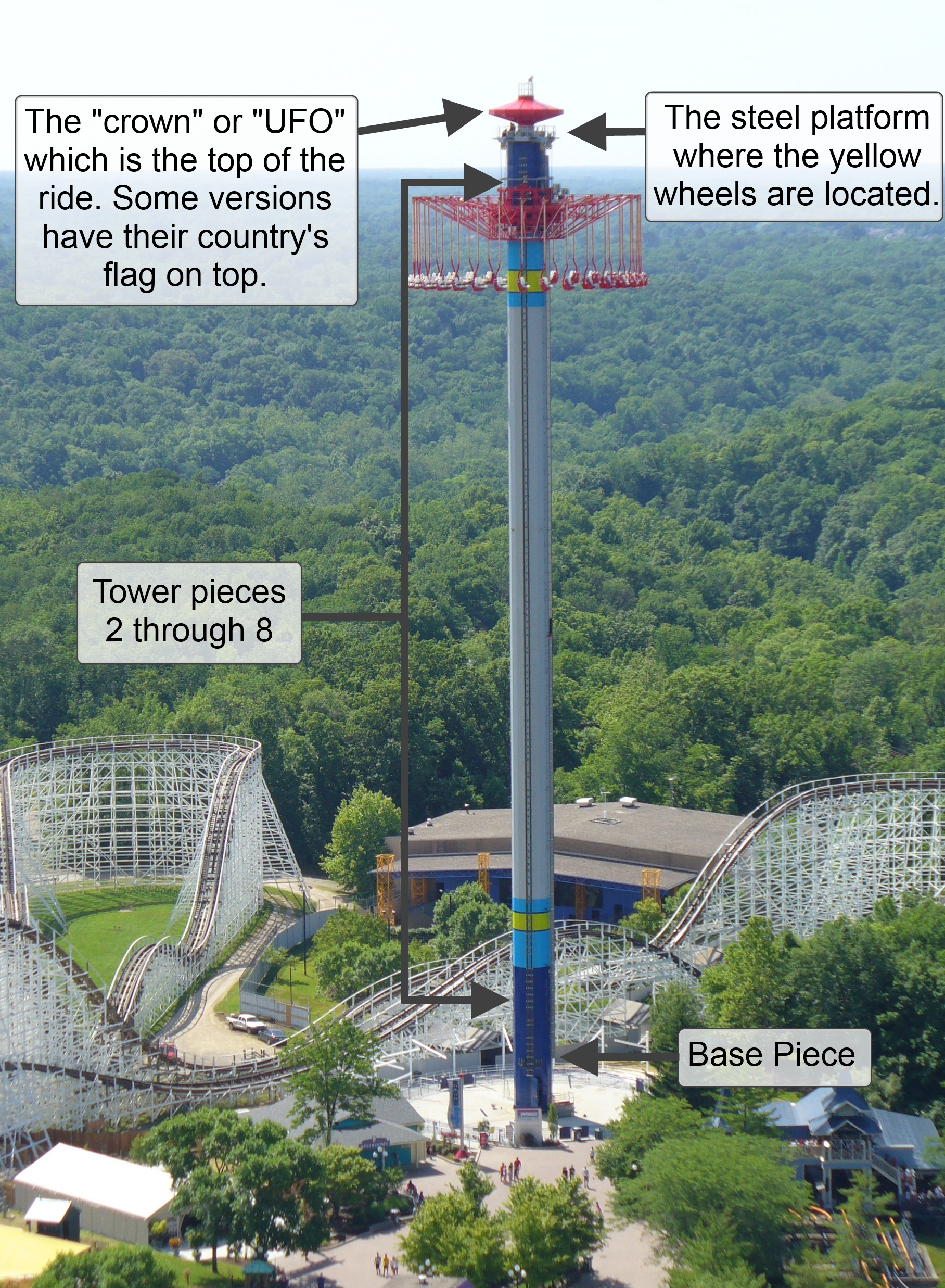
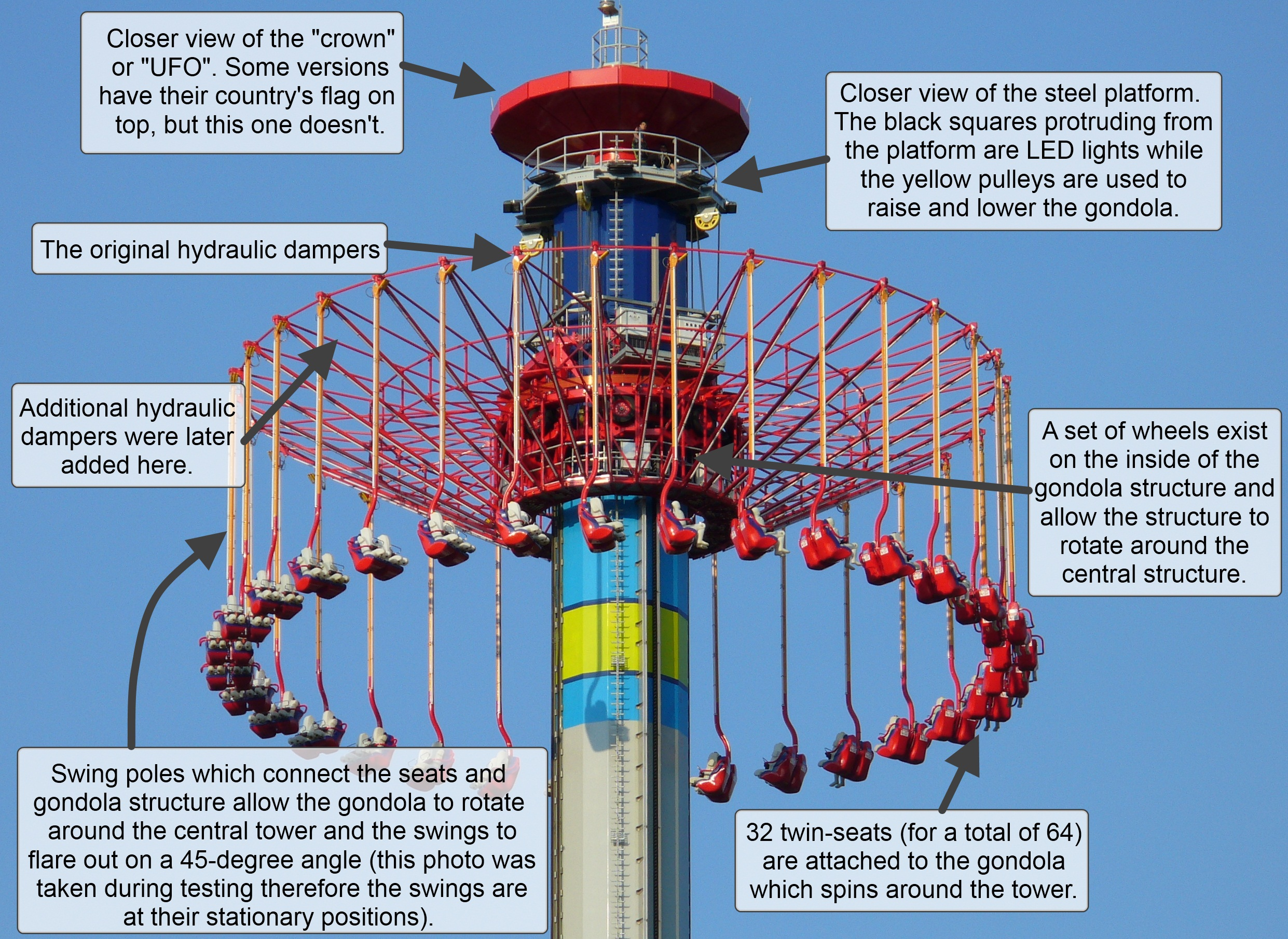
A breakdown of the structure of WindSeeker at Kings Island, including both a full-length shot of the tower (left) and a close-up of the ride carriage and the top of the tower (right).

=== Tuned Mass Damper inside "red UFO" or "Crown" ===
Inside the "red UFO" or the "Crown", a Tuned Mass Damper is hidden which is to counteract vortex shedding vibrations. Vibrations due to vortex shedding occurs at the critical wind speeds where the vortexes in the wake of the structure coincides with the structures natural frequency which causes resonance. The tuned mass damper adds damping which limits the vibrations.

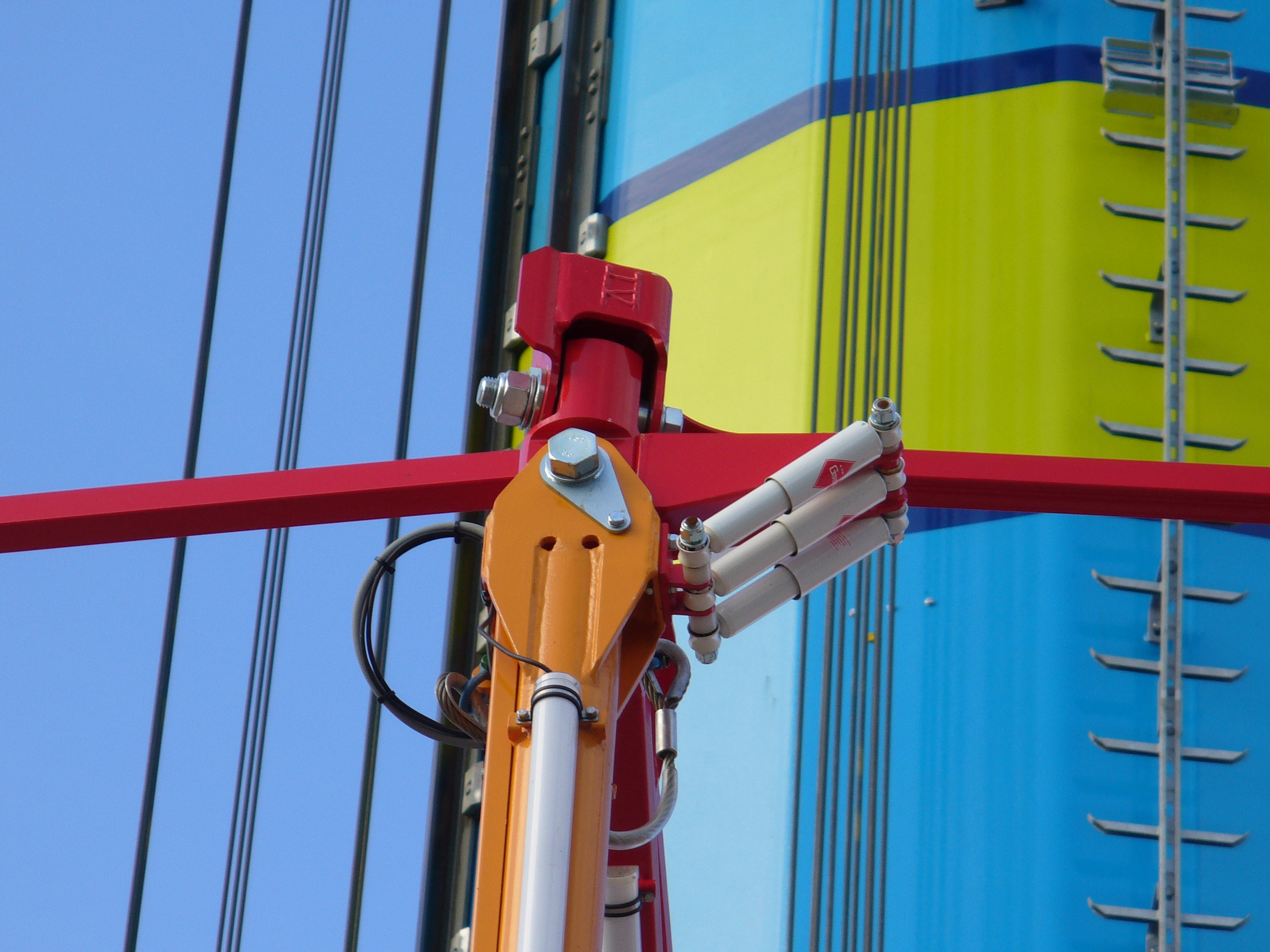
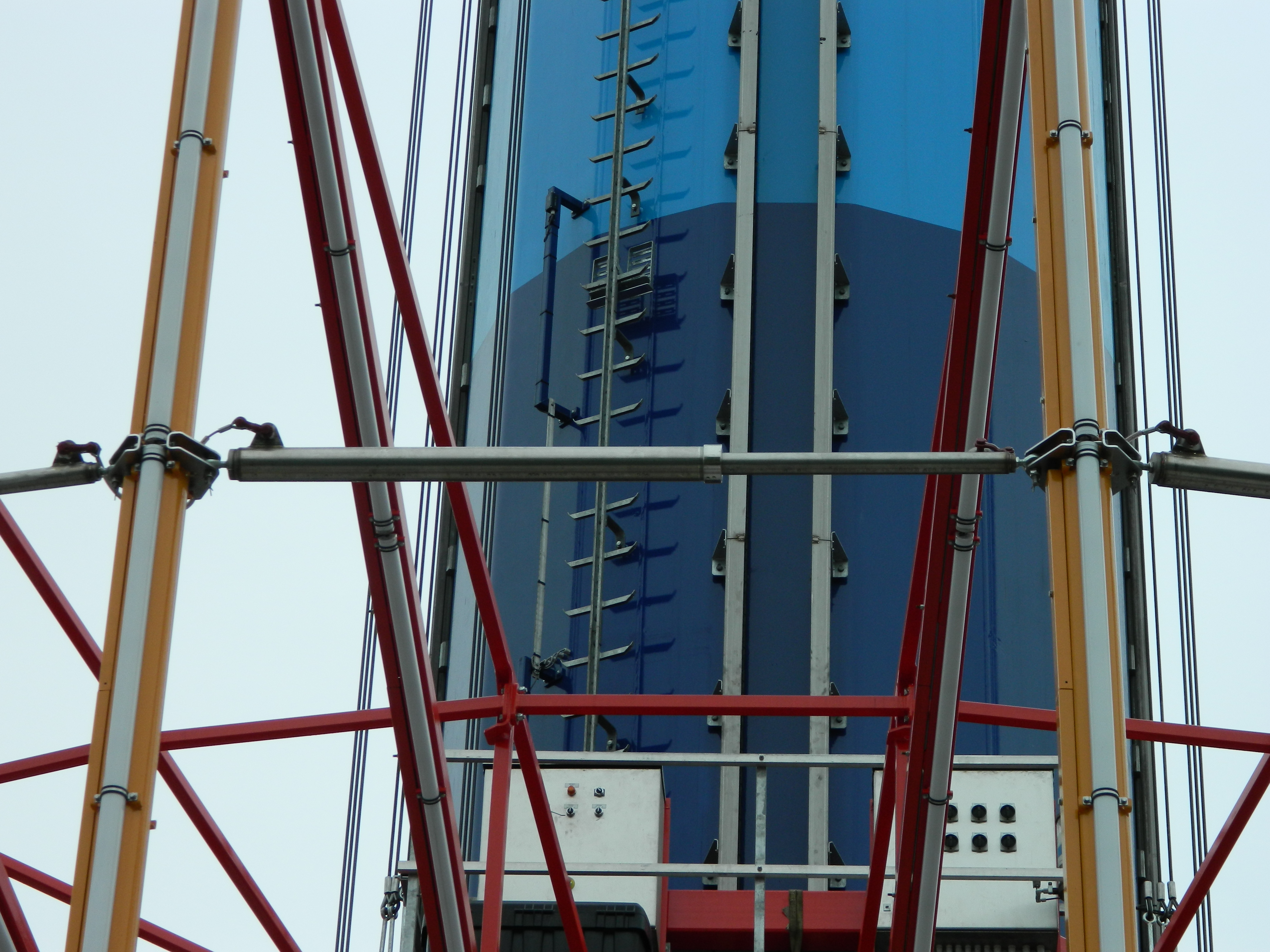
Different dampers on two WindSeekers: Cedar Point's former hydraulic dampers (left) and Kings Island's long-rod dampers (right), which are used on all models in the 2012 season.

== Ride features ==
All the WindSeekers have speakers mounted to the inside of the gondola structure. They play 18 different tracks, among which are Hedwig's theme from the Harry Potter films, the theme songs from E.T., Star Trek: The Motion Picture, and Superman, as well as songs from Flight of the Valkyries. At Cedar Point and Kings Island, the WindSeeker sign changes colors during night operation. At Cedar Point, as the gondola makes its way up the tower, the LED lights at the top of the tower go out, making the tower invisible, though the LED lights on the gondola remain lit. When the gondola comes back down, the lights at the top of the tower come on again. At Canada's Wonderland, the LED lights at the top of the tower remain on throughout the cycle, keeping the tower visible at all times.

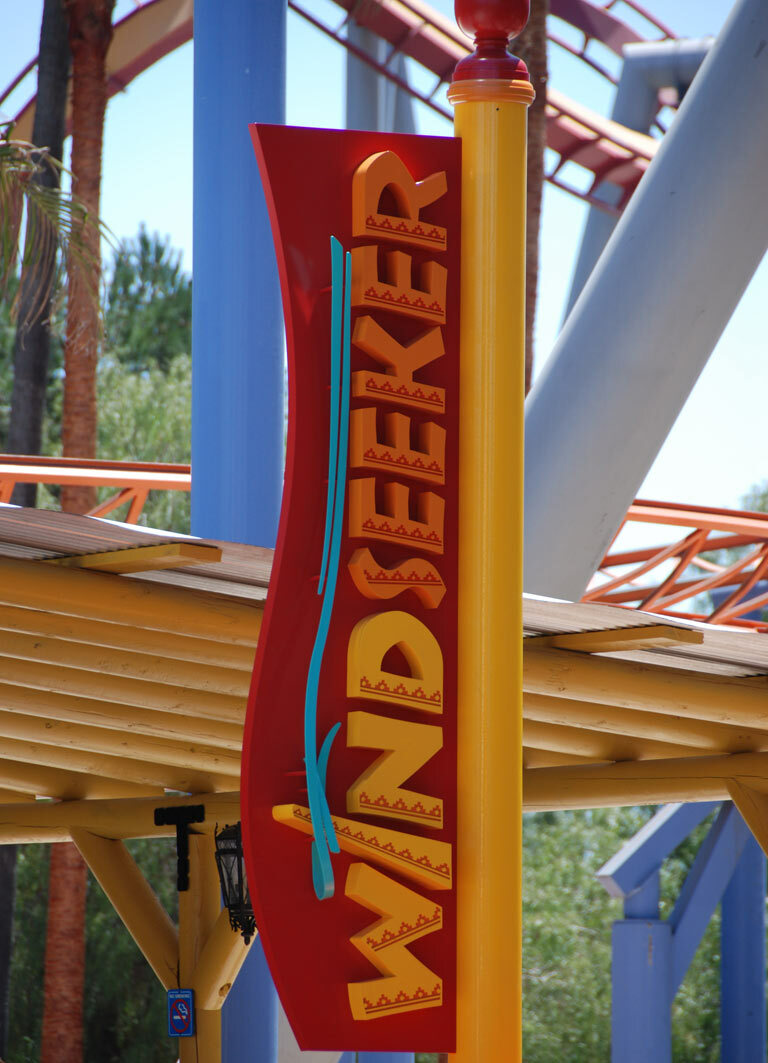
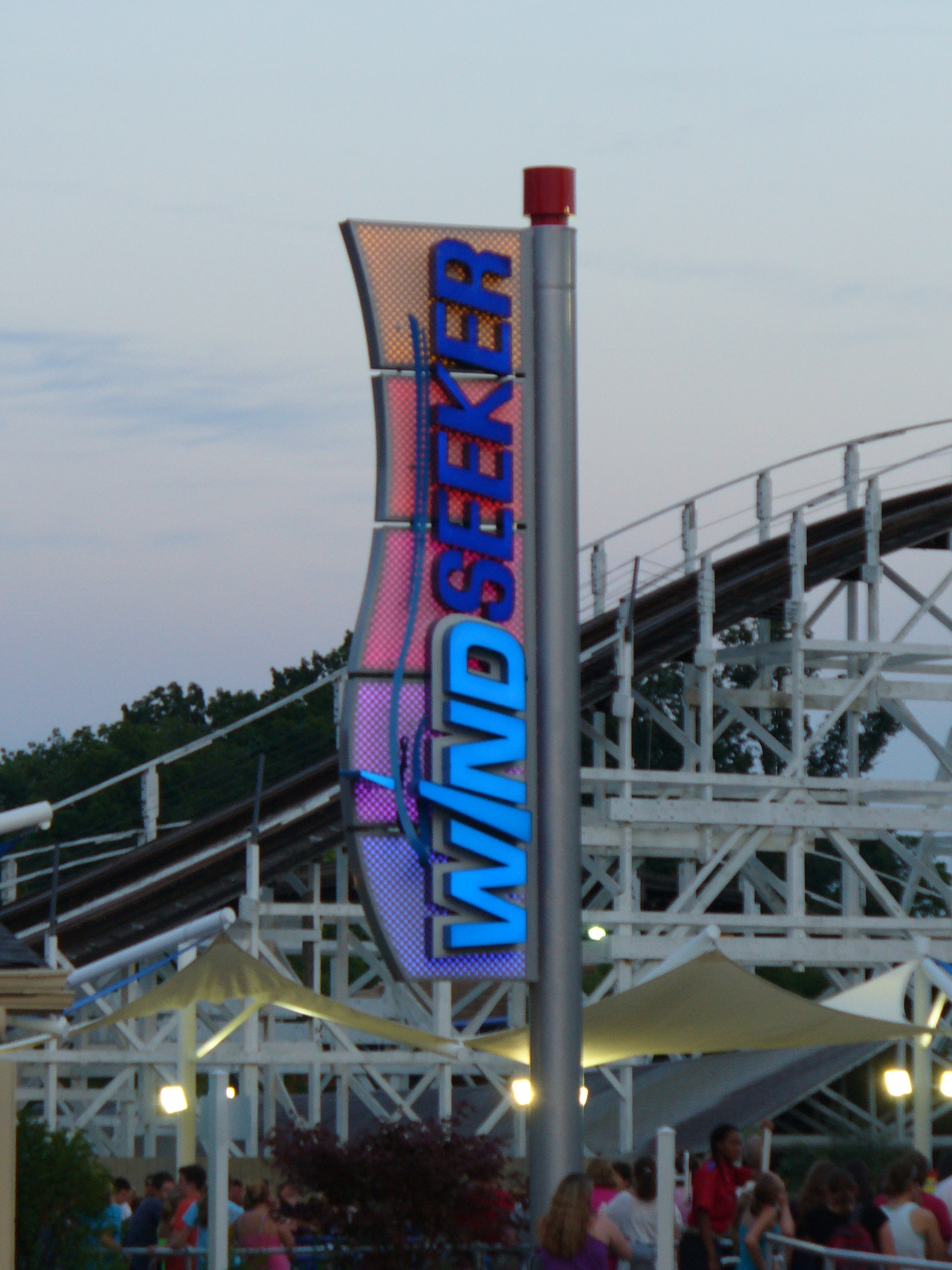
Variation among WindSeeker signs comparing Knott's Berry Farm (left) and Kings Island's (right).

The WindSeeker at Knott's Berry Farm differed from the other five in several ways. Rather than white, blue, and green on the tower, Knott's adopted a color scheme using orange, purple, and yellow to reflect the Spanish California theme of the Fiesta Village section of the park. The tower at Knott's had no lights at the top. The ride's sign had a Mexican theme and did not light up.

== Ride experience ==
Riders sit in one of 64 seats placed around a central tower, which brings the gondola up and down. A restraint bar is fixed over the rider's lap to keep them firmly in their seat. There is no seat belt across the rider's lap, but there is one from the seat to the restraint bar in case the lock on the restraint bar fails. After the operators determine that it is safe to proceed, the gondola rises to the top of the tower to a musical accompaniment, beginning to spin slowly around the central tower and picking up speed as it ascends further.

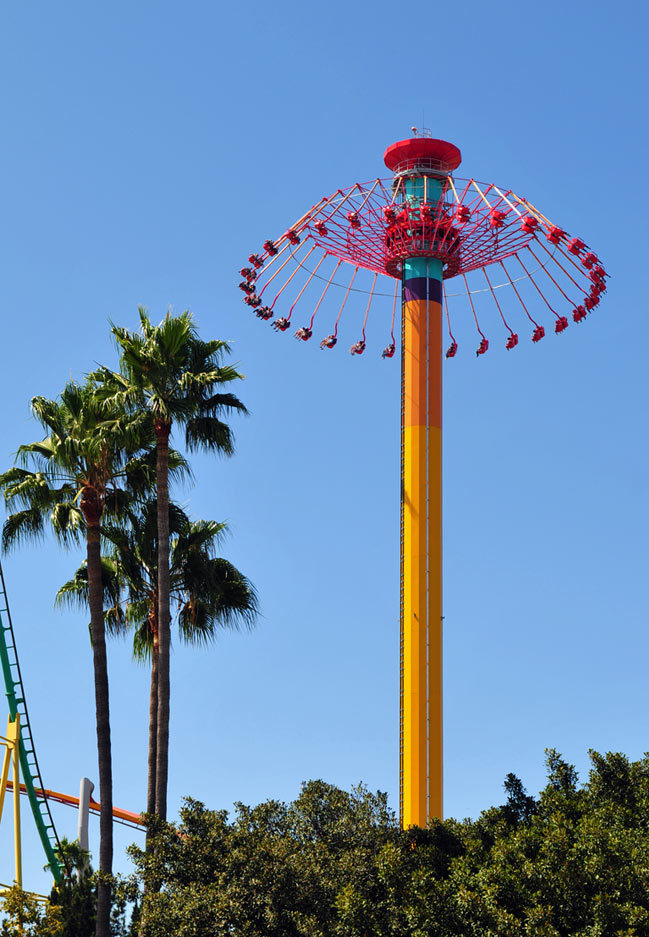
WindSeeker at Knott's Berry Farm showing the difference in colors.

By the time it reaches the top, it is rotating around the tower at its full speed of approximately 30 miles per hour (48 km/h). The gondola remains at the top of the tower for just over a minute before starting its descent and immediately beginning to slow down. By the time it reaches the bottom of the tower, all rotation ceases. One cycle of the ride lasts three minutes.

== Problems and accidents ==
The four WindSeekers opened in 2011 are based on the same prototype design by Dutch amusement ride manufacturer Mondial Rides. The WindSeeker at Canada's Wonderland was the first to be completed and thus the first to be tested. It was discovered during testing that the swings could rock back and forth once rotation reached full speed, and were close to hitting each other in some cases. Therefore, hydraulic dampers not included in the original design were added to all four WindSeekers to reduce this rocking. Nevertheless, there were still incidents: on June 14, 2011, the swings on Cedar Point's WindSeeker began to sway in different directions, and some seats almost collided with each other. In one reported case, a rider had to extend his leg to stop the seat in front from hitting him. In another, a seat collided with the kneecap of a rider who had closed their eyes. Official explanations suggested that the hydraulic dampers could fail under high winds: apparently, high winds and the imbalance arising when some swings are full and others not could cause the swings to collide. On June 29, 2011, Jennifer Valentyne of Breakfast Television Toronto rode the WindSeeker at Canada's Wonderland for her "Live-Eye" spot on the show. When the swings reached the top of the tower, the seats began swinging and hitting each other. As the ride continued, Breakfast Television hosts Kevin Frankish and Dina Pugliese asked whether the seats were supposed to touch each other, but received no response.

Additional problems were discovered when the ride opened to the public. The WindSeeker at Canada's Wonderland underwent repairs for just over a week when it was discovered that one of the 32 pairs of seats had been removed for an unstated reason. They were replaced and testing began shortly after. In another case at the same installation, riders were stuck at the top of the WindSeeker tower for 20 minutes when the swings did not come down. Since these incidents, ride operations are suspended during high winds or heavy rain.

Aside from the many minor problems all WindSeekers had in 2011, the first major accident occurred on June 2, 2012, on the Cedar Point installation. According to numerous news and rider reports, WindSeeker operated normally as the gondola made its way up the tower. Attached to the tower and gondola are a set of electrical cables that are located inside a plastic casing and are secured by two side panels to prevent the cables from moving around. At the top of the tower, winds were reportedly strong enough to push the electrical cables out of the socket on the tower causing the cables to move around freely. According to a rider riding WindSeeker at the time of the accident, as the gondola made its way back down the tower, the cables got stuck in the rotating gondola. The plastic casing began to be ripped apart as well as the cables causing the ride to come to a complete stop just over halfway up the tower. Because the electrical cables had been damaged, Cedar Point employees had to manually bring down the gondola. Riders were stuck on the ride for over an hour and no one was injured. WindSeeker at Cedar Point remained closed until the cause of the accident was found and fixed. The ride reopened on June 5, 2012.

During the 2012 season, all of the WindSeekers except Kings Island's experienced incidents in which the ride stopped, stranding riders in the air. Two such incidents occurred in September at Knott's Berry Farm, in one case leaving riders stranded at the top of the ride for nearly four hours, prompting the California Occupational Safety and Health Administration to order the ride shut down indefinitely on September 19, pending investigation of both the length of time riders were stranded and the actual causes of the incidents. Two days later on September 21, Cedar Fair announced the closure of all other WindSeekers to conduct an internal review. The company said that until the review concluded, none of the rides would operate again. The rides remained closed through the remainder of the 2012 season at the five parks, but they reopened at all parks in 2013, excluding Knott's Berry Farm's version which was relocated to Worlds of Fun.

== Reception ==
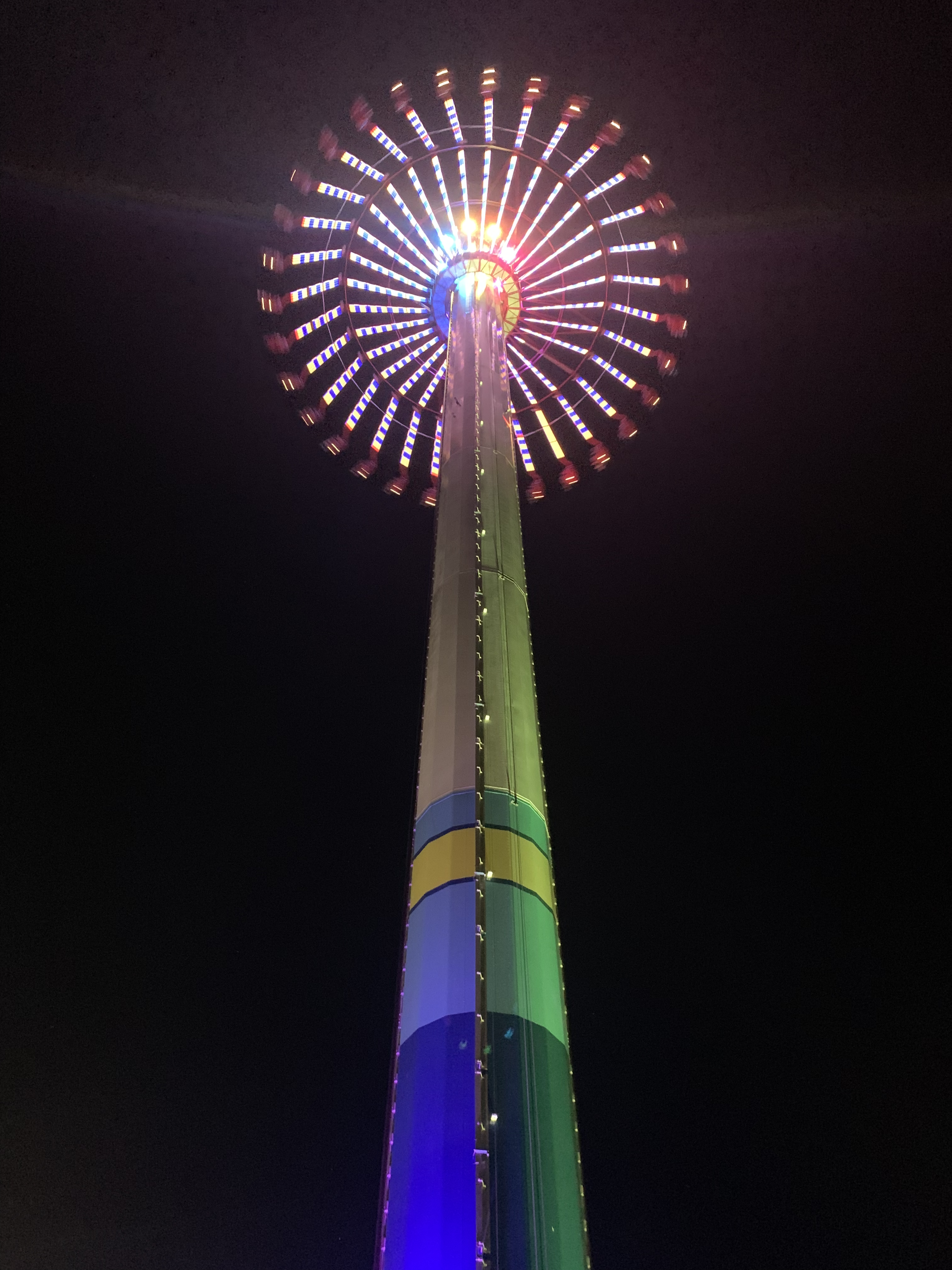
View at night (Cedar Point)

One week after the officially opening at Cedar Point, attraction reviewer Brian Krosnick of Theme Park Tourist submitted an online review saying that it was "truly breathtaking". The review applauded "the inclusion of on-ride audio and such an exemplary lighting package", commenting that it was "more than anyone expected or could've asked for". Krosnick pointed out that, because of the location of the ride beside Lake Erie and the hot summers, the lights on the ride attract massive "clouds" of bugs. He felt the ride cycle might be too short for the type of ride, particularly the time spent at the top. On July 13, 2011, Nick Sim, also from Theme Park Tourist, reviewed the ride at Kings Island and made similar remarks.

Los Angeles Times blogger Brady MacDonald complimented the "impressive nighttime spectacular from anywhere in the park". He reported having thoroughly enjoyed the ride at Knott's Berry Farm and said that he would ride it every time he visited the park. Tom Sherer of the Sandusky Register praised Cedar Point's WindSeeker for having one of the best views of the park and commented that it "isn't as extreme as a lot of people fear, unless you're afraid of heights." He criticized the name WindSeeker, pointing out that the ride closes in high winds. Another reviewer called the view from Knott's Berry Farm's version "simply breathtaking" and urged readers to "get a ride on it as soon as you can". The same reviewer, however, also criticized the choice of music, suggesting that the park should have used "themes from more 'southwestern' films" to fit with the overall theme of the Fiesta Village area. Members of the general public have also applauded the addition.

== See also ==
- SkyScreamer, a similar ride by Funtime at other Six Flags theme parks
- 2011 in amusement parks
- 2012 in amusement parks
