= Sol Spin (Knott's Berry Farm) =

Swinging Top Scan ride

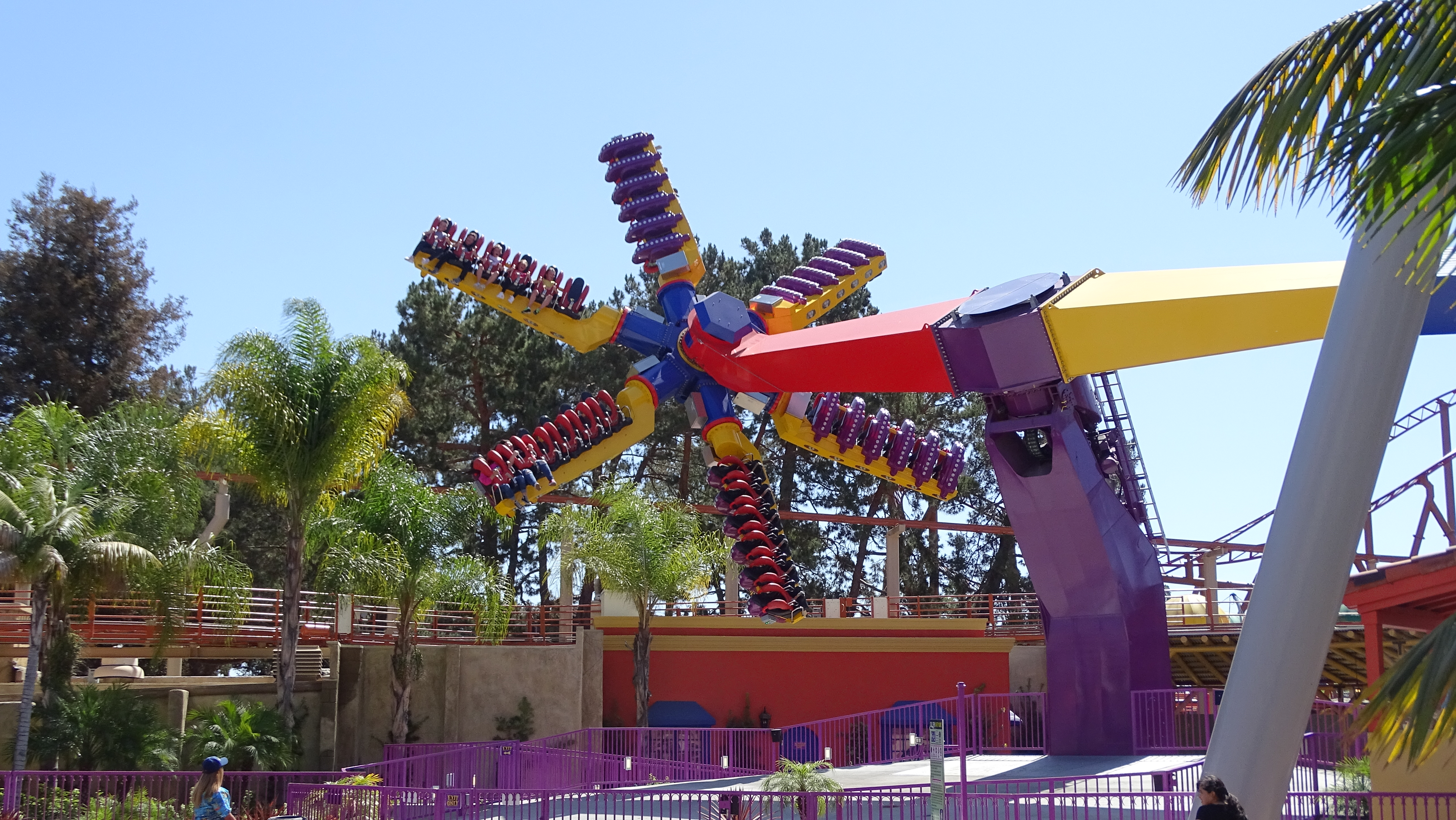
- Sol Spin

Knotts Berry Farm
- Area: Fiesta Village
- Status: Operating
- Opening date: April 21, 2017
- Replaced: Windseeker

Ride statistics
- Manufacturer: Mondial Rides
- Model: Ventura
- Height: 60 ft (18 m)
- G-force: +4g / -3g
- Capacity: 36 guests per cycle riders per hour
- Vehicles: 6
- Riders per vehicle: 6 riders for each free-rotating gondola
- Duration: 1:50
- Height restriction: 54–76 in (137–193 cm)
- Fast Lane available
- Wheelchair accessible
- Must transfer from wheelchair

Sol Spin is a swinging Ventura ride at Knott's Berry Farm built by Mondial Rides. Riders spins in a circular rotation while swinging in an angle. The ride opened to the general public on April 21, 2017 in the Fiesta Village section of the park. Designed by Mondial, Sol Spin is a tipsy top turvy adventure taking places 6 stories high over Fiesta Village. As the ride lifts off the ground, riders begin spinning in a circular motion while guests are spun around. At its peak, Sol Spin rotates guests in circular motion at 60 feet in the air. Riders can experience up to 4gs at the peak of the ride. In addition, the ride is located on the former spot of Windseeker which was also built by Mondial. Sol Spin is a Ventura ride which is an modernised version of the old Top Scan ride that Mondial makes. Knott's Sol Spin was customized to fit in the former location of Windseeker.

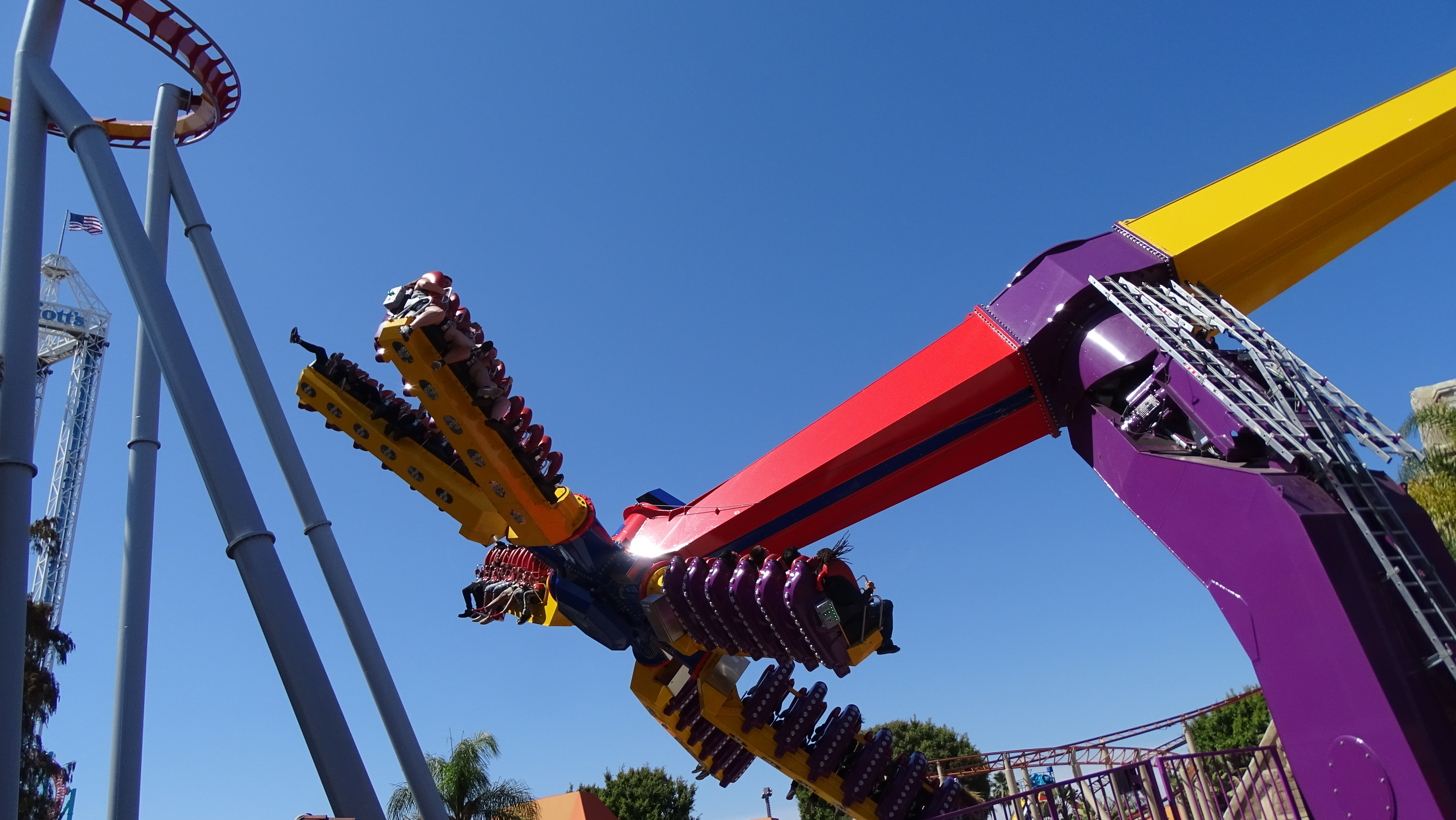
Sol Spin is a customized Top Scan Ride.

== Height Requirement ==
Sol Spin has a minimum guest requirement of 54 inches and a maximum guest requirement of 76 inches. It is one of the park's several thrill rides. The ride is rated as an aggressive thrill due to a high thrilling and intense experience. Riders of extreme sizes cannot ride due to the ride's seat design. Each is accompanied by a tight over-the-shoulder restraint and a seat belt as a secondary safety measure.

== Experience ==
Located right in the Fiesta Village of the park, guests enter a large circular area surrounded by palms and flowers. As guests enter, the ride attendant instructs which free rotating gondola is available. Mondial's Top Scan typically only seat a maximum of 5 guests per gondola, however, Knott's was able to get Mondial to redesign the ride to add an extra seat to each arm, extending the number of riders from 5 to 6 and changing the name to Ventura. This customized design increased the capacity of the ride from 30 riders per cycle to 36. Mondial was able to customize the ride for added capacity due to Knott's frequent high crowds. Moreover, Riders select any set from the 6 rotating arms. Each rotating arm holds 6 guests. Riders are the instructed to place the over the shoulder restraints. As the ride begins operation, all 6 rotating arms begin spinning in a circular motion while gaining speed and height. At the same time, the arms begin rotating at an angle and causes rides to spin six stories high. At the peak of the ride, riders are inverted a couple of times during the spinning cycle. Furthermore, one agreed criticism by some park visitors is the short cycle of the ride. Sol Spin has a short to mild operating cycle despite offering an aggressive and thrilling experience.

== Incidents ==
On November 18, 2024, 22 riders were stranded for over two hours when the ride malfunctioned and stopped mid-cycle. Park mechanics were eventually able to safely evacuate all of the riders. A park spokesperson stated that two riders were transported to a hospital "out of an abundance of caution." They were later released. Cal/OSHA is investigating to determine what caused the malfunction.

On July 26, 2025, at least 20 riders were stranded for approximately five minutes when the ride malfunctioned. Everyone exited the ride safely. The ride received a full safety inspection and reopened shortly after.
