= Shockwave (Canada's Wonderland) =

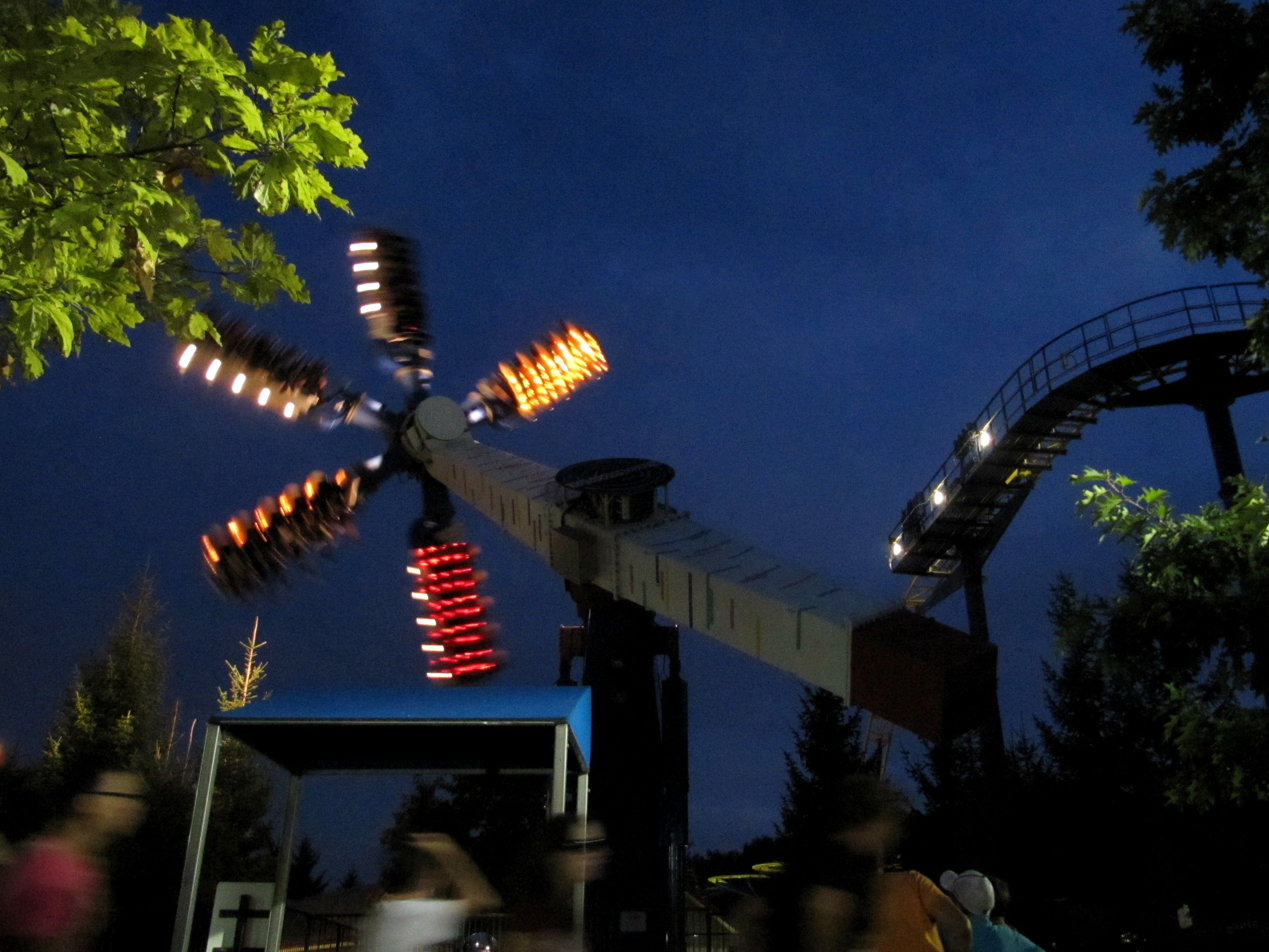
- Shockwave in operation in August 2010

Canada's Wonderland
- Area: Alpenfest
- Coordinates: 43°50′35.35″N 79°32′35.18″W
- Status: Operating
- Opening date: May 2001

Ride statistics
- Manufacturer: Mondial
- Model: Top Scan
- G-force: 4g/-3g
- Capacity: Approximately 696 riders per hour
- Rows: 6
- Riders per row: 5
- Duration: Approximately 2 minutes and 55 seconds
- Height restriction: 137 cm (4 ft 6 in)
- Fast Lane available

Shockwave is a Top Scan ride at Canada's Wonderland. The Mondial ride opened to the public in May 2001 and continues to operate today. The ride spins around on an angle while guests (while restrained on the seats) are spun around on almost every possible angle the ride operates on. Also, during the first season of operation (2001), Shockwave earned many different nicknames such as 'Protein Spill 2001'.

== Structure ==
Shockwave is made up of four main pieces. The first one are the supports. They move the riders seats high into the air to prevent the ride from hitting the ground and causing injury to riders. The second part is the arm. It is what is connected to the supports and holds the rows where riders sit in. Because the arm is always on an angle, weights are placed on the top of the arm (opposite to the seats) to balance the weight of the front of the ride to the back. The third part are the rows of seats themselves. This is where riders sit for the ride. When the ride is in operation, the rows of seats are "thrown" around and "throw" riders on every possible angle the ride can operate on.

== Ride experience ==
The ride begins by the seats raising off the ground to prevent injury when the ride begins spinning. Once the ride has reached the safe distance off of the ground, the arm begins to swing riders around in one direction. Riders continue to be spun around until the half-way point on the ride where the arm stops and begins to spin again this time towards the other direction. When the ride cycle has been completed, the arm stops rotating and the seats are returned to the ground ("loading position").
