= Mundomar =

Animal theme park in Spain

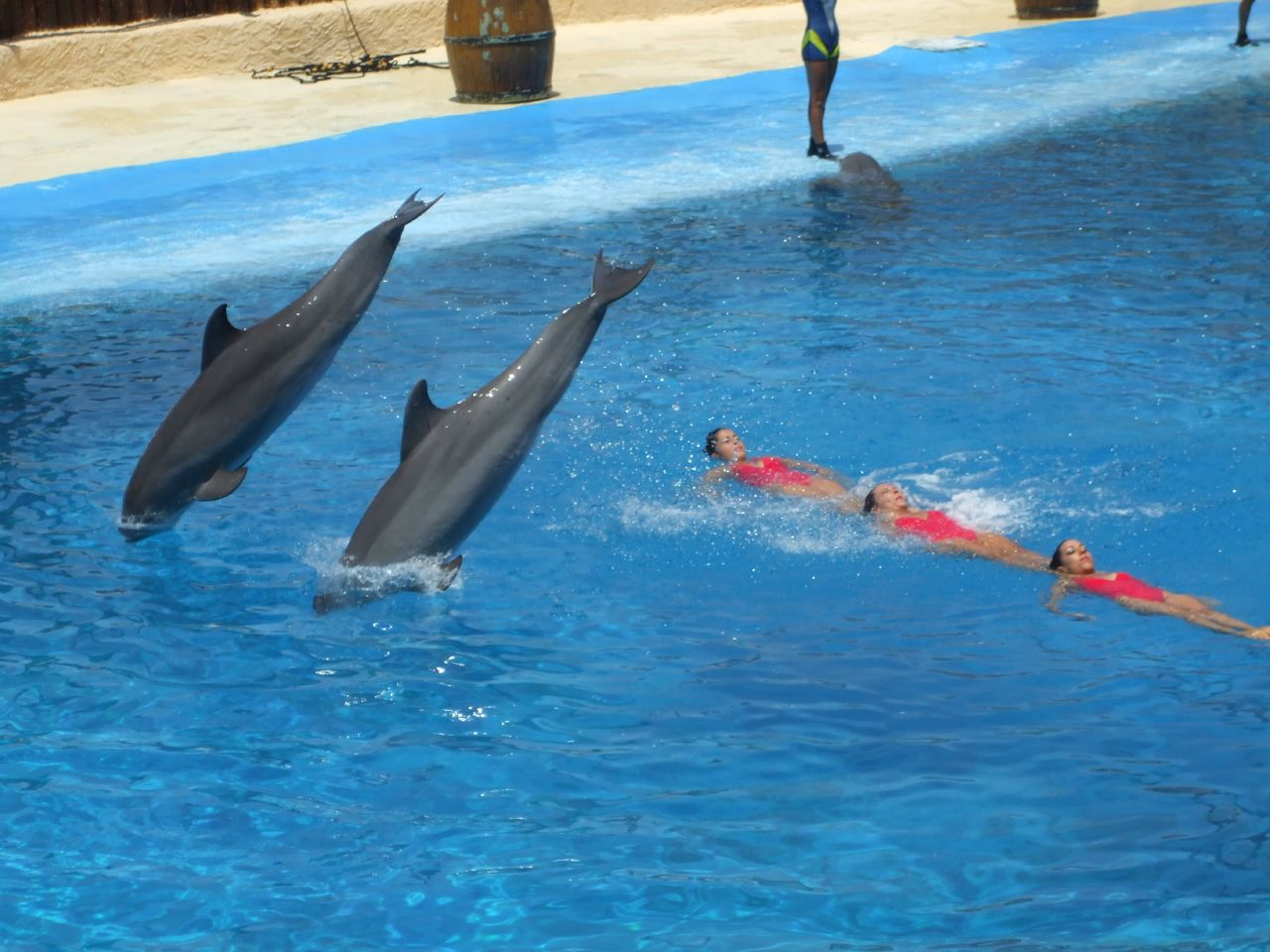
- Dolphin show at Mundomar
- Interactive map of Mundomar
- 38.540714°N 0.0934267°W
- Location: Costa Blanca, Spain
- Website: www.mundomarbenidorm.com/en/

Mundomar is an animal theme park located in Benidorm, Costa Blanca, Spain. It is the sister park to the water park Aqualandia directly adjacent to it and with which it shares the same car park. There is a viewing area at the top of Mundomar next to the Dolphinarium, which gives a view of the majority of Aqualandia.

Many different species can be viewed at Mundomar, including dolphins, sea lions, penguins, meerkats and many more marine and land animals.

There are dolphin, sea lion, and parrot displays several times a day at the park, where visitors can watch trained handlers interacting with the animals, and putting on spectacular shows.

Mundomar is usually open from February to December.
