= Aqualandia =

Water park in Spain

- Interactive map of Aqualandia
- Location: Benidorm, Costa Blanca, Spain
- Coordinates: 38.5451°N 0.0924°W

Aqualandia is a water park, located in Benidorm, Costa Blanca, Spain. It is the sister park to the animal theme park Mundomar immediately next door and with which it shares the same free car park.

Water is sourced directly from the ocean.

Aqualandia contains many water attractions, including water slides, swimming pools, river rapids and sunbathing areas.
