= List of Canada's Wonderland attractions =

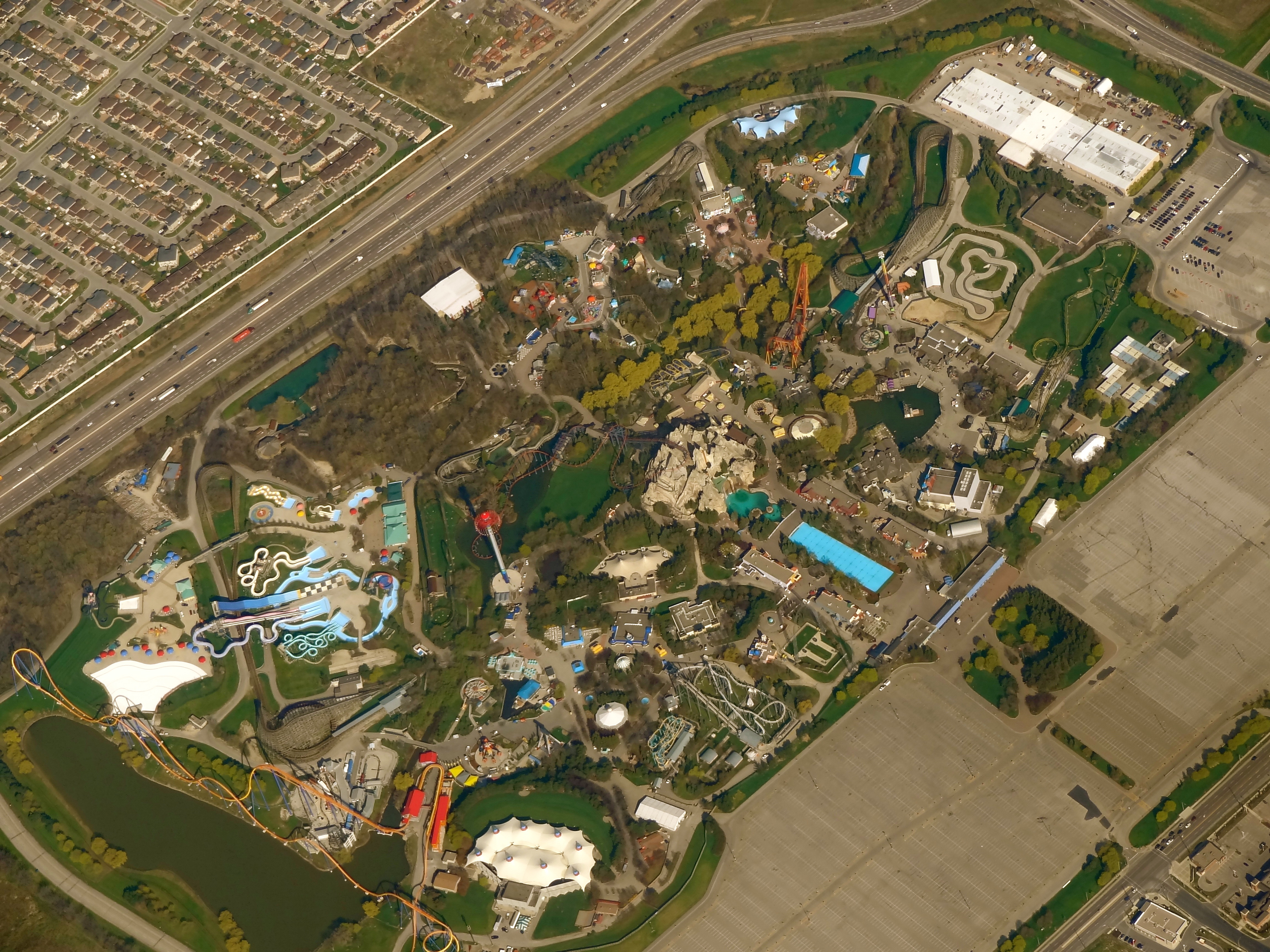
Aerial view of Canada's Wonderland in 2011, showing most of the park's attractions

Canada's Wonderland is a 330-acre (130 ha) theme park located in Vaughan, Ontario, Canada, a suburb directly north of Toronto and owned by Six Flags since its merger with the park's previous owner Cedar Fair. When Canada's Wonderland first opened in 1981 under Kings Entertainment Company ownership, there were 26 attractions. Today, there are 69, including the attractions inside Splash Works, a water park adjacent to the main theme park. Since the opening of the amusement park, at least one attraction has been added every year except 2009, 2013, 2020, and 2026, all following seasons that saw the addition of a major roller coaster. In addition, SkyRider closed permanently in 2014; it was the first roller coaster to close in the park's history and was relocated to Cavallino Matto in Italy. SkyHawk, a Sky Roller by Gerstlauer Rides, and Flying Eagles from Larson International opened in 2016. The 2017 additions include Soaring Timbers and Muskoka Plunge and the 2018 additions include Lumberjack and Flying Canoes; Soaring Timbers, Lumberjack, and Flying Canoes are flat rides, while Muskoka Plunge is a water ride. Time Warp was the second roller coaster to close permanently in Canada's Wonderland.

Up until 1992, Canada's Wonderland did not have a water park. Eleven years after the park opened, Splash Works was constructed in the area surrounding the Mighty Canadian Minebuster. Original plans and park maps during construction of the park show that the area that is now Splash Works and formerly White Water Canyon was originally planned to be a themed area called "Frontier Canada", a section of the park devoted to the Canadian wilderness. Although this section became realized in 2019, albeit under Cedar Fair management, several of the elements that were to be included are scattered across the park before then. Yukon Striker, a dive coaster from Bolliger & Mabillard, was added in 2019 in the Frontier Canada section to replace SkyRider.

For safety, Canada's Wonderland uses a ride rating system that classifies the attractions based on the intensity of the ride. The ratings vary from 1, for rides that are calm and gentle, to 5, for rides that have high speeds, aggressive forces, and rapid elevation changes. A separate set of ride ratings criteria is used for attractions inside Splash Works, though the rides are still rated on a scale from 1 to 5.

== Main theme park ==
Attractions located in the main theme park
Ride	Image	Ride manufacturer	Type or model	Location	Thrill Level	Ref(s)
AlpenFury		Premier Rides	Launched roller coaster	Alpenfest	5	
Antique Carrousel		Philadelphia Toboggan Company	Carousel Ride	Grande World Exposition of 1890	1	
Backlot Stunt Coaster		Premier Rides	Launched roller coaster	Action Zone	5	
The Bat		Vekoma	Boomerang roller coaster	Medieval Faire	5	
Beagle Brigade Airfield		Zamperla	Flying Tigers	Planet Snoopy	2	
Behemoth		Bolliger & Mabillard	Hypercoaster	Action Zone	5	
Blast Off!		S&S Worldwide	Frog hopper	KidZville	2	
Boo Blasters on Boo Hill		Sally Corporation	Interactive dark ride	Planet Snoopy	2	
Character Carrousel		Chance Rides	Carousel	Planet Snoopy	1	
The DareDeviler		Vekoma	Suspended Looping Coaster	Grande World Exposition of 1890	5	
Dragon Fyre		Arrow Dynamics	Steel roller coaster	Medieval Faire	5	
Drop Tower		Intamin	Giant Drop	Medieval Faire	5	
The Fly		Mack Rides	Wild Mouse roller coaster	International Festival	4	
Flying Canoes		Preston & Barbieri	Avio	Frontier Canada	2	
Flying Eagles		Larson International	Flying Eagles	KidZville	2	
Frequent Flyers		Bradley & Kaye	Balloon	KidZville	2	
Ghoster Coaster		Philadelphia Toboggan Company	Wooden roller coaster	Planet Snoopy	4	
Joe Cool's Dodgem School		Lusse Brothers Incorporated	Bumper cars	Planet Snoopy	2	
Jokey's Jalopies		Bradley & Kaye	Antique cars	Planet Snoopy	1	
Jumpin' Jet		Zamperla	Crazy Bus	KidZville	2	
KidZville Station		Mack Rides	Train ride	KidZville	1	
Klockwerks		Huss	Swing Around	International Festival	3	
Krachenwagen		Lusse Bros.	Bumper cars	International Festival	4	
Leviathan		Bolliger & Mabillard	Giga coaster	Medieval Faire	5	
Lucy's Tugboat		Zamperla	Rockin' Tug	Planet Snoopy	2	
Lumberjack		Zamperla	Hawk 48	Frontier Canada	5	
Maplepark Treehouse		—N/a	Children's playground	KidZville		
Mighty Canadian Minebuster		Canada's Wonderland Rides Company / TAFT Rides Company	Wooden roller coaster	Frontier Canada	5	
PEANUTS 500		Zamperla	Speedway	Planet Snoopy	2	
Psyclone		Mondial	Frisbee/Revolution	Action Zone	5	
The Pumpkin Patch		SBF Visa Group	Air balloons	Planet Snoopy	2	
Riptide		Mondial	Top Spin	Medieval Faire	5	
Sally's Love Buggies		Preston & Barbieri	Eureka	Planet Snoopy	2	
Shockwave		Mondial	Top Scan	International Festival	5	
Silver Streak		Vekoma	Suspended Family Coaster	KidZville	4	
SkyHawk		Gerstlauer Rides	Sky Roller	Action Zone	5	
Sledge Hammer		HUSS	Giant Jump 2	Action Zone	5	
SlingShot		Funtime	Sling Shot	Action Zone	5	
Snoopy's Racing Railway		ART Engineering	Family launch coaster	Planet Snoopy	3	
Snoopy's Revolution		Zamperla	Children's ferris wheel	Planet Snoopy	1	
Snoopy's Space Race		Intamin	Mini Enterprise	Planet Snoopy	2	
Snoopy vs. Red Baron		Bradley & Kaye	Jump Around^{[nb 2]}	Planet Snoopy	2	
Soaring Timbers		Mondial	Inferno	Frontier Canada	5	
Spinovator		Mack Rides	Teacups	Medieval Faire	4	
Sugar Shack		Zamperla	Teacups	KidZville	2	
Swan Lake		Bradley & Kaye	Swan ride	Planet Snoopy	1	
Swing of the Century		Zierer	Wave Swinger	Grande World Exposition of 1890	3	
Swing Time		Zamperla	Children's swing	KidzVille	1	
Taxi Jam		E&F Miler Industries	Children's roller coaster	KidzVille	3	
Thunder Run		Mack Rides	Powered roller coaster	International Festival	4	
Timberwolf Falls		Hopkins Rides	Shoot-the-Chutes	Frontier Canada	4	
Treetop Adventure		Caripro Amusement Technology	Tram	KidZville	1	
Tundra Twister		Mondial	Avalanche (Swinging pendulum ride with free-swinging gondolas)	Frontier Canada	5	
Viking's Rage		HUSS	Pirate Boat	Medieval Faire	3	
Vortex		Arrow Dynamics	Steel suspended roller coaster	Frontier Canada	5	
White Water Canyon		Intamin	River rapids ride	Frontier Canada	3	
Wilde Beast		Taft Broadcasting	Wooden roller coaster	Medieval Faire	5	
Wilde Knight Mares		Huss	UFO	Medieval Faire	5	
WindSeeker		Mondial	Wind Seeker	Action Zone	5	
Wonder Mountain's Guardian		Triotech	4D interactive dark ride	International Festival	4	
Woodstock Whirlybirds		SBF Visa Group	Satellite	Planet Snoopy	2	
Yukon Striker		Bolliger & Mabillard	Dive Coaster	Frontier Canada	5	

== Splash Works ==
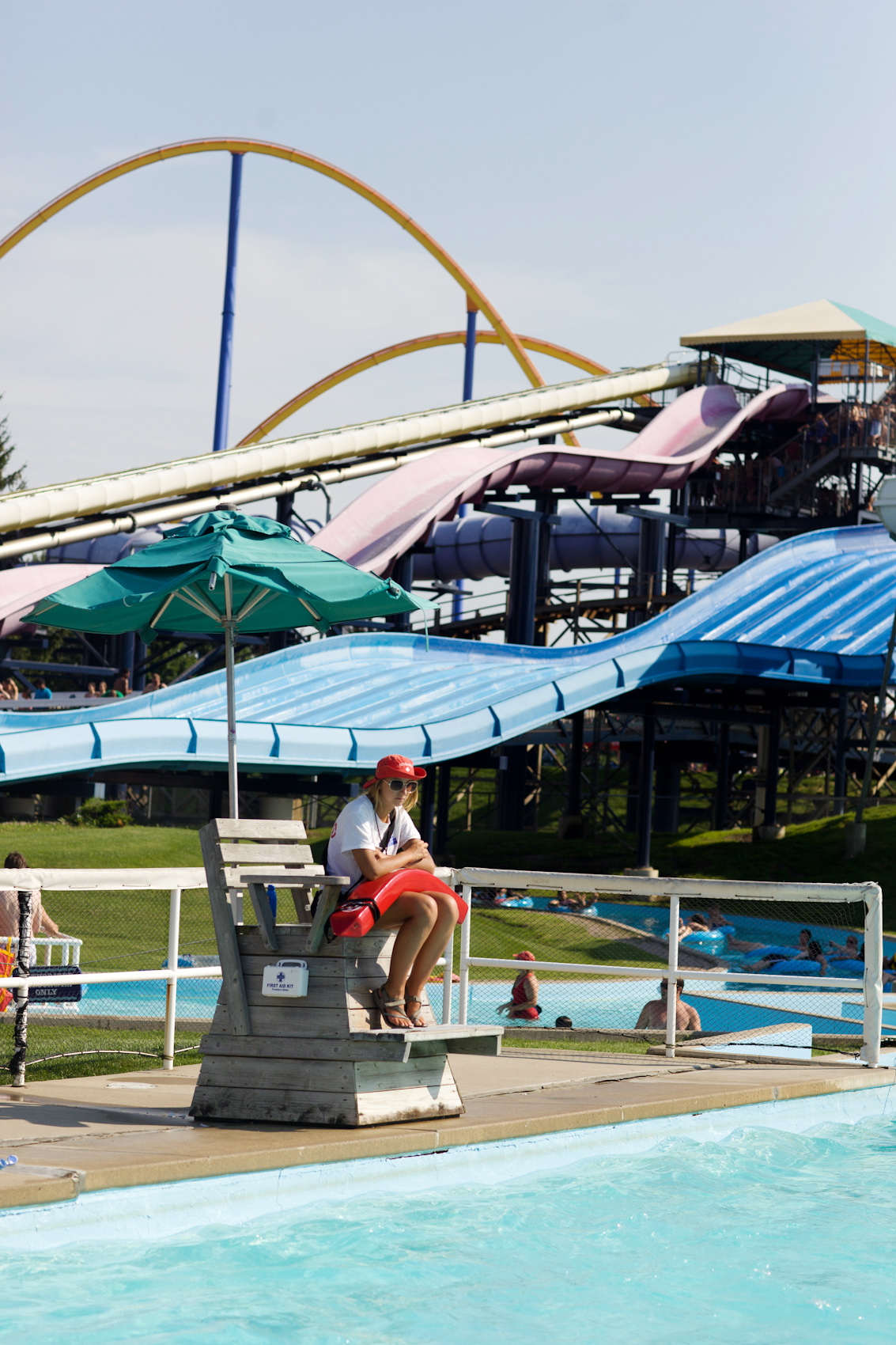
The amusement park is also home to Splash Works, a water park with a number of rides and attractions.

Splash Works opened in 1992, eleven years after Canada's Wonderland opened. Four years later, Canada's Wonderland expanded the water park by adding Whitewater Bay (a wave pool), The Pump House (an interactive children's playground), and The Black Hole (an enclosed water slide). There were two more expansions in 1999 and 2002, introducing new slides and attractions to the water park.

12 years later, the park announced that Splash Works would receive a new water slide, Typhoon, and an interactive aquatic playground, Splash Station.

In 2017, Muskoka Plunge opened, replacing the former Body Blast. 2018 saw the addition of two new children's slides & the renovation of the Splash Island Kiddie Pool, transforming the area into Lakeside Lagoon. The 2020 season introduced Mountain Bay Cliffs, a cliff-jumping attraction featuring platforms of various heights that guests can jump off of into a large pool. The opening of the attraction was delayed to the 2021 season due to the COVID-19 pandemic.

Some attractions require a personal flotation device (PFD; "lifejacket") in order to ride.

Attractions located in Splash Works
Ride Name	Ride Manufacturer	Type/Model	Year Opened	Thrill Level	Ref(s)
Barracuda Blaster	ProSlide Technology	Bowl water slide	2002	4	
The Black Hole	ProSlide Technology	Enclosed water slide	1996	5	
Lakeside Lagoon	—N/a	Children's pool and water slides	2018	1	
Lazy River	Water Technology	Lazy river	1992	3	
Moosehorn Falls	WhiteWater West	Boomerango-style raft slide	2024	5	
Mountain Bay Cliffs	—N/a	Cliff jumping-style attraction	2021	5	
Muskoka Plunge	SplashTacular	4 trapdoor-style speed slides	2017	5	
The Plunge	ProSlide Technology	Family raft water slide	1999	4	
The Pump House	Specialized Component Supply Co.	Interactive aquatic playground	1999	2	
Typhoon	ProSlide Technology	Tornado 12	2015	4	
Riptide Racer	ProSlide Technology	8-lane mat racer water slide	2002	4	
Sprayground	—N/a	Interactive water playground	2002	1	
Splash Island Waterways	ProSlide Technology	Children's raft water slide	2002	2	
Splash Station	—N/a	Interactive aquatic playground	2015	1	
Super Soaker	ProSlide Technology	Family raft water slide	1999	4	
Whirl Winds	ProSlide Technology	2 intertwining speed slides	1992	3	
Whitewater Bay	Aquatic Amusements Associates Ltd.	Wave pool	1996	4	

== Notes ==
1. Denotes the requirement that guests pay an additional fee for the ride or attraction.
2. Denotes that the ride is similar to another manufacturer's model name.

== See also ==
- List of former and renamed Canada's Wonderland attractions
