= List of former and renamed Canada's Wonderland attractions =

Canada's Wonderland is a 330-acre (130 ha) theme park located in Vaughan, Ontario. Opened in 1981 by the Taft Broadcasting Company and The Great-West Life Assurance Company as the first major theme park in Canada, it remains the country's largest amusement park. More than 45 attractions including rides, stores, and restaurants have been removed or renamed over the years.

== Former attractions ==
The following are attractions which have been removed or replaced:

Former attractions at Canada's Wonderland
Name	Opened	Closed	Description/Fate
Wonder Mountain Walkway	1981	1986	Prior to the addition of Thunder Run, visitors could walk a pathway that led to an observation deck on the top of the mountain. It was closed to make way for relocated mechanical equipment which was taken from the inside of the 'mountain' and placed in the public areas, and because a danger was caused to people riding Thunder Run due to garbage being thrown from the walkway onto the track below. Another portion of the walkway, which went behind Victoria Falls, remained open for a number of years afterwards, being closed in the mid-1990s because of accidents due to slippery walkways.
Pharaoh's Eye	1981	1987	Pharaoh's Eye Round Up was removed to make way for the Racing Rivers water-slide attraction, which currently is the site where Psyclone and Sledge Hammer are located. Swing of the Century was also located in that area at the time when it was known as the Swing of Siam, but it was moved to its current location to make way for the Racing Rivers.
Zumba Flume	1981	1994	Zumba Flume was a classic log flume ride. It was removed to make way for Flight Deck (Top Gun).
Snail Trail	1981	1997	Snail Trail (formerly Boo Boo's Buggies (1981–1983), and Lazy's Snail Trail (1984-1992)) was a small circular kiddie ride where children could ride in their own snail-drawn carriage. It was removed at the end of the 1997 season and was replaced by Swing Time, which opened in 1998.
Bedrock Dock	1981	1999	Bedrock Dock was a small boat ride, removed in 1999, to make way for Scooby Doo's Haunted Mansion, as well as the ongoing removal of everything Flintstones-related from the park. It was later located at Carowinds, as Snoopy's Yacht Club (formerly Little Bill's Cruisers, until the end of the 2009 season). It was removed following the 2017 season in preparation for Camp Snoopy.
Bayern's Curve	1981	2000	Bayern's Curve was a 16-car attraction (Schwarzkopf) which ran in a circle many times, situated next to Wonder Mountain. It closed at season's end in 2000. This ride was most famous for the massive horn as part of the set, and the blast the horn sounded as the ride reached its maximum speed. Klockwerks replaced Bayern's Curve, as it was moved 'across the street' to accommodate Shockwave the next year. As of 2008, Bayern's Curve was said to have been shipped to Kings Dominion, where it sits in storage.
Bedrock Aquarium	1981	2002	Originally called "Saltwater Circus", this marine show tent was closed in 2003 when Nickelodeon Central replaced the northern section of Hanna-Barbera Land. In 2002, it was renamed the "Bedrock Event Tent." It was shut down after the last of the Flintstones-themed elements were eliminated from the park. After nine years of being in a state of disrepair, the Aquarium was finally demolished in September 2011, to make way for Dinosaurs Alive!.
HotRock Raceway	1981	2002	HotRock Raceway was closed in 2002 due to difficulty in maintaining the ride and increasing downtime.
Flintstones Flyboys	1981	2002	Flintstones Flyboys was rider-controlled round ride, similar to Aerofield, removed in 2002 along with the ongoing removal of everything Flintstones-related from the park.
The Fury	1981	2003	The Fury (originally Shiva's Fury (1981–2001)) was removed at the end of the 2003 season to make way for Time Warp (Tomb Raider: The Ride). It was later sent to Kings Island to be used as spare parts on its identical ride.
The Great Whale of China	1981	2003	The Great Whale of China was removed at the end of the 2003 season to make way for Time Warp (Tomb Raider: The Ride). It was in storage behind Kingswood before being relocated to Carowinds where it is now known as Peanuts Pirates (formerly Revenge of the Flying Dutchman until the end of the 2009 season).
SkyRider	1985	2014	SkyRider closed on September 1, 2014, to make room for Yukon Striker and Tundra Twister. It was sold to Cavallino Matto an amusement park in Tuscany where it operates as Freestyle.
Smurf Forest	1984	1992	A funhouse-like building that featured scenes of Smurfs in their "natural" habitat. This attraction was actually converted from Yogi's Cave in Yogi's Forest (1981–1983) before the area was changed to Smurf Forest for the 1984 season. Also featured near the end was a section of Gargamel's house where Gargamel would be playing his organ. Gargamel's house was formerly the Ranger's Cabin during its use in Yogi's Cave. Smurf Village was removed and replaced by an arcade until 1998 where it housed Meet-and-Greets with the Rugrats. Currently, it functions as KidZville Candy, KidZville Guest Services (Security) and mini-arcade in the Zoom Zone area.
Pharaoh's Falls	1988	2000	Two of the Racing Rivers water slides that had riders sitting on plastic runners (sleds) and descended at a very steep angle starting at 30 feet, it was removed for an unknown reason. However, the loading tower remained standing until its removal at the end of the 2001 season for Psyclone.
Watersnake	1988	2001	The other two Racing Rivers water slides that were tubular, enclosed, and twisted, and had riders sitting on inner-tubes, it was removed at the end of the 2001 season for Psyclone.
Jet Scream	1990	2010	Jet Scream was a looping starship ride Manufactured by Intamin, which spun riders in a 360-degree rotation 10 stories high. It was removed to make way for the new WindSeeker ride at the end of the 2010 season.
Wipe Out	1992	2004	Wipe Out (originally Drop Zone (1992-1996)) was a large near vertical waterslide known internally as the "70" for being 70 feet (21 m) tall, was closed by the end of the 2004 season.
Pipeline	1992	2001	Pipeline was a short criss-crossing covered waterslide, was removed to make way for Riptide Racer.
Body Blast	1992	2016	Body Blast was a water slide complex in Splash Works that consisted of three winding body slides that emptied into a pool. It was removed to make way for Muskoka Plunge.
Jumbo Bumps	1993	2000	Jumbo Bumps was a large slide located in the Kid's Kingdom playground, now known as The Candy Factory, it was removed to make way for the new Zoom Zone area including Silver Streak, Blast Off, and Jumpin' Jet.
Pro Putt	1993	2016	Pro Putt was a mini golf course located in International Festival, was removed to make way for Soaring Timbers.
A-maze-ing Adventure	1998	2015	The A-maze-ing Adventure was a small obstacle course maze set up in Kidzville, was removed to make way for Flying Eagles. As of 2018, the parts sit in storage behind Wilde Beast.
Launch Pad	2003	2017	Launch Pad was an up-charge attraction located in White Water Canyon where the Days of Thunder 4D ride was formerly located. It featured six trampolines, was removed to make way for Flying Canoes. The ride now sits in storage.
Orbiter	1981	2018	Orbiter (formerly Sol Loco) was a HUSS Enterprise that was dismantled in February 2019 due to low popularity and high maintenance costs. The ride is currently for sale. This ride was removed and a pathway is now connecting the new Frontier Canada and Action Zone areas.
Peanuts Putt-Putt	1993	2019	Peanuts Putt-Putt was a children's mini golf course that was removed after the 2019 season to make way for Beagle Brigade Airfield.
Xtreme Skyflyer	1996	2023	Xtreme Skyflyer was a ride that featured an arch that held a cable to which the riders were attached and two towers that lifted the riders. Riders first step onto a scissor lift, where they are raised into the loading position. Operators then hook the riders onto a cable that brings the riders to the top of the tower and a cable that holds the riders during the free-fall. After operating for 27 years, the ride closed down at the end of the 2023 season to make way for AlpenFury.
Time Warp	2004	2024	Zamperla Volare flying roller coaster.
Speed City Raceway	1997	2025	J&J Amusements Go karts; pay-per-use.

== Former shows ==
Former Shows at Canada's Wonderland
Name	Opened	Closed	Description
School of Rock	2005	2006	The show was based on the 2003 Jack Black movie School of Rock, featuring live music and dancing.
Hollywood's Stunt Spectacular	2006	2006	The show was an action show with explosions, weapons and vehicular stunts. The show was located in the park's parking lot.
The Eruption	1998	2001	A nighttime pyrotechnic show with 40 ft flames smoke ash geysers and even more special effects, the park removed this show as it became very expensive to produce due to the park using liquid propane for large flame effects with minimal smoke. The show consisted of 3, 5-10 minute segments consisting of a 20/30 minute show, while the show lasted it drew large crowds to the front of the park. One of the most notable shows on International Street besides Starlight Spectacular is the "new version" of The Eruption using modern day technology.
Snoopy Rocks On Ice	2010	2011	Similar to rotational stage shows on a cruise ship this show contained a mashup of music that ice skaters and characters performed to in Wonderland Theatre
The Nickelodeon Parade	2006	2006	Nickelodeon characters, including SpongeBob SquarePants, Dora the Explorer and a cast of over 100 performers, the award-winning Nickelodeon Celebration Parade brings families to their feet as they find themselves face to face with the stars of Nickelodeon. From tossing jellyfish with SpongeBob SquarePants and his friends, to beating drums with Donnie from the Wild Thornberrys, to playing Pin the Tail on the Donkey with Little Bill, kids become the stars of the show with interactive games that take place during stops along the parade route. But this event isn't just for the kids. Adults have a chance to get in on the action as we "let the pie fly." As with anything Nickelodeon, someone may end up with a face full of whipped cream! The Nickelodeon Celebration Parade, winner of the International Association of Amusement Parks and Attractions' (IAAPA) 2004 & 2005 Big E Award for Best Production: Parade Performance, was presented daily at 6:00pm[EST]

== Former restaurants and shops ==
Former Restaurants and Shops at Canada's Wonderland
Name	Description
New York Fries	The New York Fries at the park became Hot Potato.
Mr. Sub	Mr. Sub was replaced by Subway in 2012
Bubble Tease	The Bubble Tease behind Wonder Mountain was converted back to Cookie Cafe.
You Go Grill	You Go Grill was replaced by Chicken Shack for the 2013 season.

== Renamed attractions, restaurants, and shops ==
A number of rides and attractions have been renamed to correspond with area theme changes.

Renamed attractions at Canada's Wonderland
	Description/Former name/Reason for name change
Spinovator	Spinovator in Medieval Faire was originally called Quixote's Kettles. It was renamed for the 1997 season.
Klockwerks	Klockwerks in International Festival was originally called Klockwurker. It was renamed for the 1991 season.
Wilde Knight Mares	Wilde Knight Mares in Medieval Faire was originally called Wilde Knight Mares. It was renamed Night Mares for the 1997 season. However, it was reverted to Wilde Knight Mares for the 2019 season.
Viking's Rage	Vikings Rage in Medieval Faire was originally called Viking's Rage. It was renamed The Rage for the 1997 season. However, it was reverted to Viking's Rage for the 2019 season.
The Orbiter	The Orbiter in the Grand World Exposition of 1890 was originally called Sol Loco. It was renamed in 2002. During the 2006 season, the ride was slated to be dismantled and relocated to another park. After Cedar Fair Entertainment Company acquired the Paramount Parks chain, the decision was reversed. The ride was rebuilt and reopened later that year. The ride was removed after the 2018 season.
Wilde Beast	Wilde Beast in Medieval Faire was originally called Wilde Beast. It was renamed Wild Beast for the 1997 season. However, it is reverting to Wilde Beast for the 2019 season.
Dragon Fyre	Dragon Fyre in Medieval Faire was originally called Dragon Fyre. It was renamed Dragon Fire for the 1997 season. However, it is reverting to Dragon Fyre for the 2019 season.
Splash Island Waterways	Splash Island Waterways in Splashworks was called Scooby Splash Island. It was renamed during the 2002 season during the phase-out of Hanna-Barbera characters.
Swing of the Century	Swing of the Century was known as Swing of Siam and was located where Psyclone and Sledge Hammer are today with a different theme. It was relocated to its current location for the 1988 season and received its current name in 1989.
The Fury	The Fury was known as Shiva's Fury until 1998. In 2003, the ride was demolished.
Thunder Run	Thunder Run in the International Festival was called Blauer Enzian, and was located roughly where The Fly is currently located. It was moved into Wonder Mountain, extended, and renamed Thunder Run in 1986.
Courtyard	The Courtyard group catering facility in Medieval Faire was called King's Courtyarde Group Catering Facility. The exact date of the name change from King's Courtyarde Group Catering Facility to King's Courtyard Group Catering Facility for the 1993 season. Then the name was changed yet again to its current day name in 2000.
Canterbury Theatre	The Canterbury Theatre in Medieval Faire was called The Paramount Theatre prior to the sale of Canada's Wonderland to Cedar Fair. It was originally called The Canterbury Theatre when it was built. The date of the name change was during the 2008 season to Wonderland Theatre. The original name was changed in 1994 when the theatre's name was changed to The Paramount Theatre. However, it was reverted to The Canterbury Theatre for the 2019 season.
Jokey's Jalopies	Jokey's Jalopies in Kidzville was originally called Wonder Tour from 1981–1997.
Kidzville Station	Kidzville Station in Kidzville was originally called Scooby Choo from 1981–1997.
Frequent Flyers	Frequent Flyers in Kidzville was originally called Balloon Race from 1981–1997.
Swan Lake	Swan Lake in Planet Snoopy (Formerly Hanna-Barbera Land) was originally called Happy Landing from 1981–1997.
Snoopy's Space Race	Snoopy's Space Race in Planet Snoopy was originally called Scoobyville Rocketport from 1981–2000. Then from 2001-2009 it was known as Jetson's Rocketport.
Snoopy Vs. Red Baron	Snoopy Vs. Red Baron located within Planet Snoopy was known as Aerofield from 1981–2009.
Grande World Eatery	The Backlot Cafe restaurant in the Grand World Exposition of 1890 was formerly called Southside Grille from 1992–2005. Southside Grille was renovated in 2006 and was reopened as The Backlot Cafe, featuring large screen TVs, gourmet food stations and an improved decor. As a result of the name change, the Wonderland staff cafeteria (which used to be called The Backlot Cafe. The Staff Cafeteria was also once called "The Lemon Lounge") was renamed Oscar's. Oscar's was then renamed Cornerstones Cafe after the new company, Cedar Fair's commitments to its cornerstone philosophy in 2007. Also, before Southside Grille, it was called Ginza Gardens from 1981–1986, and then also had the name Oriental Gardens from 1987–1991, which explains the former Japanese façade it had.
Traveler's Roadside Cafe	Traveler's Roadside Cafe restaurant between the Vortex and White Water Canyon used to be Tucker's Roadside Cafe. The name was changed in 1997 to prevent confusion due to the opening of the Tucker's Marketplace buffet restaurants across Ontario.
International Street Pizza Pizza	International Street Pizza Pizza used to be called Ristorante, an Italian-themed restaurant. Wonderland Food Services stopped serving its own pizza and Italian food after the introduction of Pizza Pizza into the park.
International Street Starbucks	International Street Starbucks used to be La Cantina, a Mexican-themed restaurant which closed in 2005.
International Marketplace	International Marketplace was once Arthur's Pizza Pizza which was also Arthur's Pub & Grille.
SuperStar Recording Studios	SuperStar Recording Studios were removed from the park at the end of the 2004 season due to removal of the concession from the park. The video studio in Expo was replaced with a Hot Press tee-shirt stand, and then in 2007 by the new Coasters restaurant, and the audio recording studio in International Festival was renovated and replaced with a "Multi-Faith Space" prayer room.
Backlot Stunt Coaster	Backlot Stunt Coaster was called Italian Job: Stunt Track until after the 2007 season, due to Viacom's sale of the park to Cedar Fair.
The DareDeviler	Flight Deck was called Top Gun until after the 2007 season due to Viacom's sale of the park to Cedar Fair. Then from 2008 to 2025 it was called Flight Deck.
Riptide	Riptide was called Cliffhanger until after the 2007 season due to Viacom's sale of the park to Cedar Fair.
Time Warp	Time Warp was called Tomb Raider: The Ride until after the 2007 season due to Viacom's sale of the park to Cedar Fair.
Drop Tower	Drop Tower was called Drop Zone until after the 2007 season due to Viacom's sale of the park to Cedar Fair.
Treetop Adventure	Was originally named Chopper Chase from 1998–2015. It was renamed during the 2016 season.
Sugar Shack	Originally named Flavourator from 1998–2015. It was renamed during the 2016 season.
Maple Park Treehouse	Was originally The Candy Factory and before that Kids Kingdom from 1998–2015. Was renamed during the 2016 season.
Snoopy Snacks	Snoopy Snacks is in the KidZville area. This used to be called Scooby's Snacks before the park changed from Nickelodeon to Peanuts. Scooby's Snacks in the Scoobyville section of Hanna-Barbera Land (now KidZville) was originally called Granny's Sweets before Scooby's Snacks was renamed in July 2008. Scooby's Snacks became Snoopy Snacks in 2010 when Planet Snoopy was introduced.
Tacos/Nachos	A Mexican/Mayan themed restaurant located in Grande World Exposition Of 1890 (Now Action Zone) from 1981–1996. The building was then used for various attractions. Eventually, the building was demolished during the off-season of 2006/2007 and Coasters had opened for the 2007 season.

== See also ==
- List of Canada's Wonderland attractions
