= Sledgehammer (disambiguation) =

A sledgehammer is a large manual impact tool which has a metal head distinguishing it from a mallet with head made of softer material.

Sledgehammer or Sledge Hammer may also refer to:

== People ==
- 911 (wrestler), also known as Sledge Hammer, stage name of professional wrestler Al Poling (born 1957)
- Eugene Sledge, United States Marine PFC, nicknamed Sledgehammer

== Arts, entertainment, and media ==
=== Music ===
- "Sledgehammer" (Peter Gabriel song), 1986
- "Sledgehammer" (Fifth Harmony song), 2014
- "Sledgehammer" (Rihanna song), 2016
- "Sledgehammer", a song by Bachman-Turner Overdrive from their 1974 album Not Fragile

=== Television ===
- Sledge Hammer!, a satirical TV sitcom which ran from 1986 to 1988
- "Sledgehammer" (Grey's Anatomy), a 2015 episode of Grey's Anatomy

=== Other arts, entertainment, and media ===
- Sledgehammer (film), a slasher film from 1983
- Sledgehammer, video game character from Clock Tower 3
- Sledgehammer Blues, an independent record label
- Sledgehammer Games, a video game studio owned by Activision

== Military operations ==
- Sledgehammer (alleged coup plan), an alleged military coup plan in Turkey
- Operation Sledgehammer, a 1942 Allied plan in World War II for cross-Channel invasion of Europe (not executed)
- Operation Sledgehammer (2007), 2007 military search operation during the Iraq war

== Other uses ==
- Sledgehammer (Isabelle), a tool of the Isabelle proof assistant
- Sledgehammer (ride), a ride at Canada's Wonderland theme park
- Sledgehammer Corvette, an 880hp Corvette modified by Callaway Cars
- Opteron, a 64-bit CPU made by AMD, codenamed SledgeHammer
