= Wilde Knight Mares =

HUSS UFO at Canada's Wonderland in Vaughan, Ontario, Canada

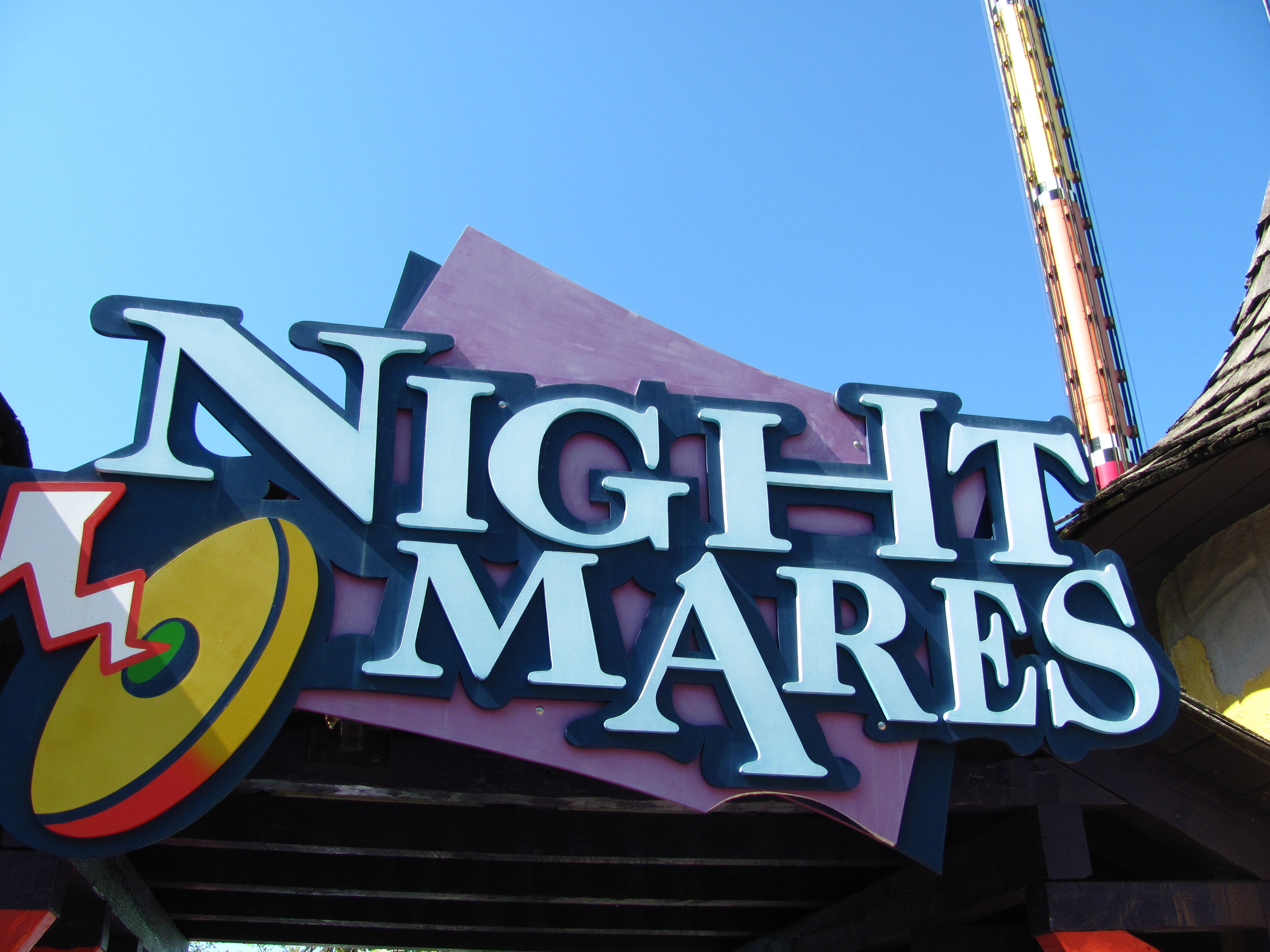

Canada's Wonderland
- Area: Medieval Faire
- Coordinates: 43°50′38.78″N 79°32′33.07″W
- Status: Operating
- Opening date: May 23, 1981

Ride statistics
- Attraction type: UFO
- Manufacturer: HUSS Park Attractions
- Height: 15 m (49 ft)
- Vehicles: 12
- Riders per vehicle: 4
- Duration: 1 minute and 30 seconds
- Height restriction: 137 cm (4 ft 6 in)
- Fast Lane Available

Wilde Knight Mares (formerly known as Night Mares) is a HUSS UFO at Canada's Wonderland in Ontario, Canada. The ride is an original at Canada's Wonderland as it opened along with the rest of the park in 1981. This ride is similar to Orbiter, which is a defunct attraction also at Canada's Wonderland. As of 2023 the ride is the only known HUSS UFO remaining in North America.

== History ==
When the ride first opened on May 23, 1981, its name was Wilde Knight Mares. In 1997, its name was changed for unknown reasons to "Night Mares", before reverting to its previous name before the start of the 2019 season.

== Structure ==
Wilde Knight Mares has four main parts. The first is the grey "arm" that supports the entire ride, whether it is in operation or not. The second is the centre red-and-black "wheel" which is attached to the "arm". The wheel also supports the structure of the ride. The third part consists of the black metal supports that support the 12 carriages. The fourth and final part is the carriages themselves, where the riders stand when the ride is in operation.

== Ride experience ==
Riders stand in one of twelve carriages laid out to form a perfect circle around the base of the ride. Each carriage holds four people. There is no seat belt or restraint system on the ride, only a cage to hold on to while the ride is in motion. As the ride reaches full speed, gravity keeps the riders in place even when the ride is on a 90-degree angle. It takes about 16 seconds for the ride to reach full speed before "launching" off the ground and takes just over 30 seconds to get into a vertical position (90-degree angle). The ride remains in the vertical position for about 10 – 15 seconds before returning down into the loading (horizontal) position.
