= Viking's Rage (Canada's Wonderland) =

Swinging ship ride at Canada's Wonderland in Vaughan, Ontario, Canada

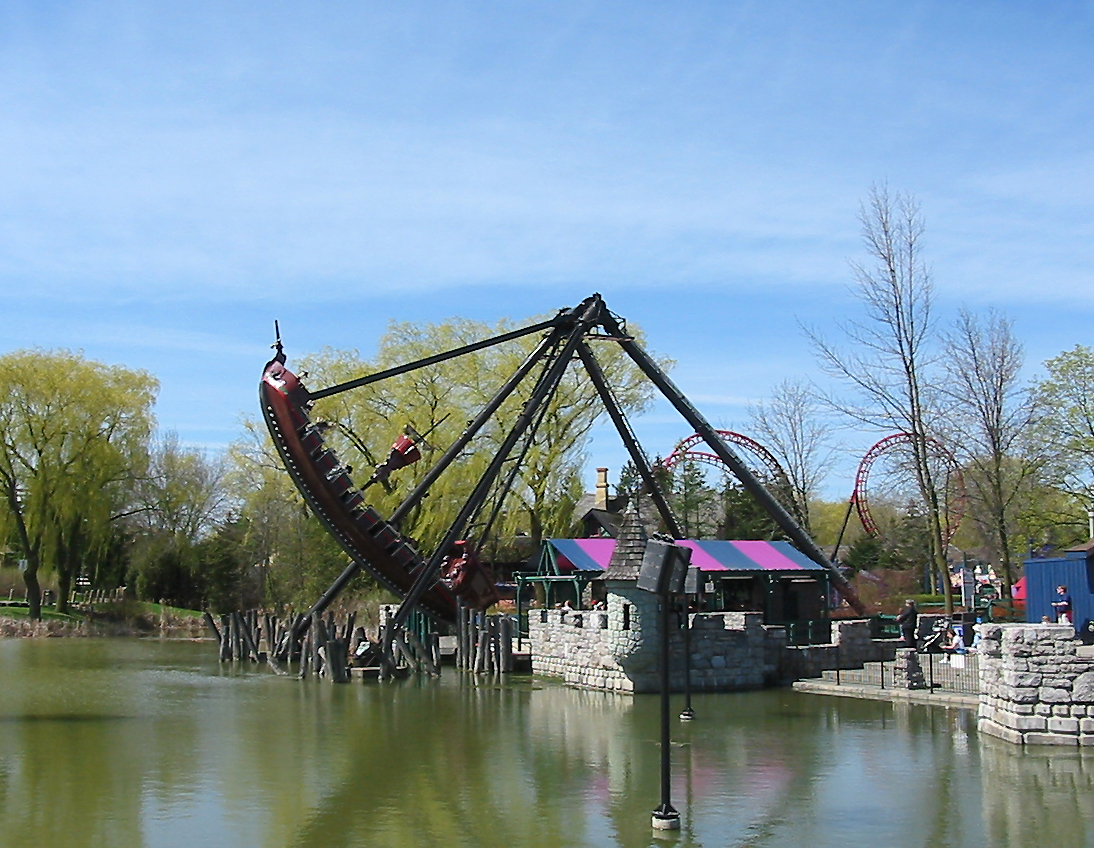
- Viking's Rage (then "The Rage") during operation in the 2007 season.

Canada's Wonderland
- Area: Medieval Faire
- Coordinates: 43°50′38.11″N 79°32′30.71″W
- Status: Operating
- Opening date: 1981

Ride statistics
- Attraction type: Swinging Ship
- Manufacturer: HUSS Park Attractions
- Rows: 9
- Riders per row: 5 - 6
- Duration: 2 minutes and 30 seconds
- Height restriction: 99 cm (3 ft 3 in)
- Fast Lane available

Viking's Rage is a swinging ship ride at Canada's Wonderland. Viking's Rage was the first of three swinging pendulum rides that operated at the park. Today, there are four pendulum rides at the park, including Psyclone, Tundra Twister & Lumberjack.

The ride opened in 1981 as Viking's Rage, but was renamed The Rage in 1997. This name change lasted up until 2019, in which the park reverted it back to Viking's Rage.

== Structure ==
Viking's Rage consists mainly of four different parts. The first part is the "ship" itself, where riders sit during the ride. The second part consists of the four supports that hold the entire ride up. They hold the "ship" and what the "ship" hangs on. The third part is what the "ship" hangs on. It is made up of several different parts and involves anything above the "ship" excluding the supports. The fourth (and final) part are the two mechanical wheels underneath the "ship". This is what pushes the "ship" forward whenever the "ship" passes over the wheels.

== Ride experience ==
For a total ride time of about 2 minutes and 30 seconds, the "ship" begins by swinging higher and higher every time it passes over the wheels underneath (Still staying under 90-degrees). Once the ride begins to stop, the wheels act like brakes which slow down the "ship" every time it passes over the wheels until the ride comes to a complete stop.
