= UFO (ride) =

Amusement park ride

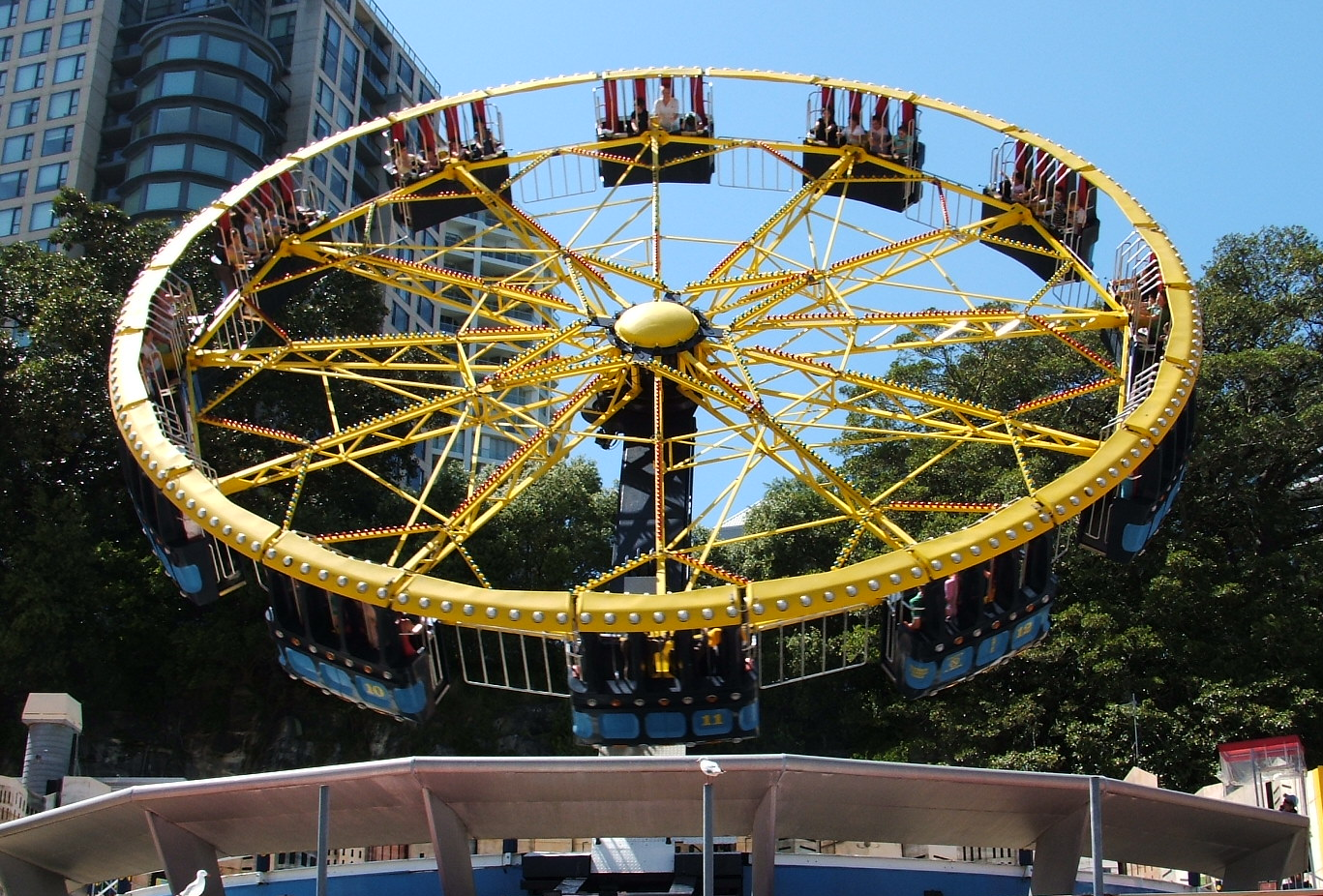
- A UFO at approximately half lift. Flying Saucer at Luna Park Sydney
- Status: Discontinued
- First manufactured: 1978
- No. of installations: Over 25
- Manufacturer: HUSS Maschinenfabrik
- Vehicle type: 12 carriages/vehicles positioned in a way to form a circle.
- Riders per vehicle: 4
- Restraint Style: Cage

The UFO is an amusement park ride designed by HUSS Maschinenfabrik in 1978, based on the company's Enterprise and Skylab amusement rides. Numerous carnivals feature this ride which is known as Alpha One Peeters and Vertical Limits.

== Design and operation ==
The UFO consists of twelve, four-person gondolas, mounted in a circle around a central drive hub. This hub is in turn connected to a hydraulic arm. The ride is rotated to produce enough centrifugal force to stick the riders to the wall of the gondola furthest from the centre. Once this is achieved, the hydraulic arm is used to move the entire ride from the horizontal position to near-vertical. The time between the ride beginning to spin and the ride reaching near-vertical is approximately sixty seconds. The ride must be lowered back to the horizontal position before the rotation can cease.

There are no safety restraints on the UFO; the centrifugal force is strong enough to prevent riders from experiencing any major movement while the ride is not at horizontal, and in the event of a rotational or power failure, the size and spacing of the bars that make up the gondola 'cage' (along with enforced height and safety restrictions), prevents riders from falling out.

Nevertheless, minimum rider height requirement is usually 54 inches (140 cm) or taller, as much as some extreme roller coasters.

== Appearances ==
There are believed to be very few UFOs operating worldwide.

- Canada - One; Wilde Knight Mares at Canada's Wonderland.
- South Africa - One; The UFO at Gold Reef City.
- France - One; UFO traveling throughout France.
- The Netherlands - One; Alpha 1 traveling throughout Germany.
- United Kingdom - One; Vertical Limit is/was traveling throughout the United Kingdom by John Wesseldine. It had previously operated at Flamingo Land Resort.

== Past Appearances ==
- USA - Two; UFO at Darien Lake (Operated from 1980 to 2012) and UFO at Lagoon (Operated from 1982 to 1982)
- Australia - One; Flying Saucer at Luna Park Sydney (Operated from 1995 to 2013)
- Sweden - One; UFO at Liseberg (Operated from 1981 to 1986)
- United Kingdom - Two; UFO at Flamingo Land Resort (Operated from 1995 to 2004) and UFO 2000 at West Midland Safari Park (Operated from 1986 to 1919??)
