= Time Warp (roller coaster) =

Roller coaster

- Previously known as Tomb Raider: The Ride (2004–2007)
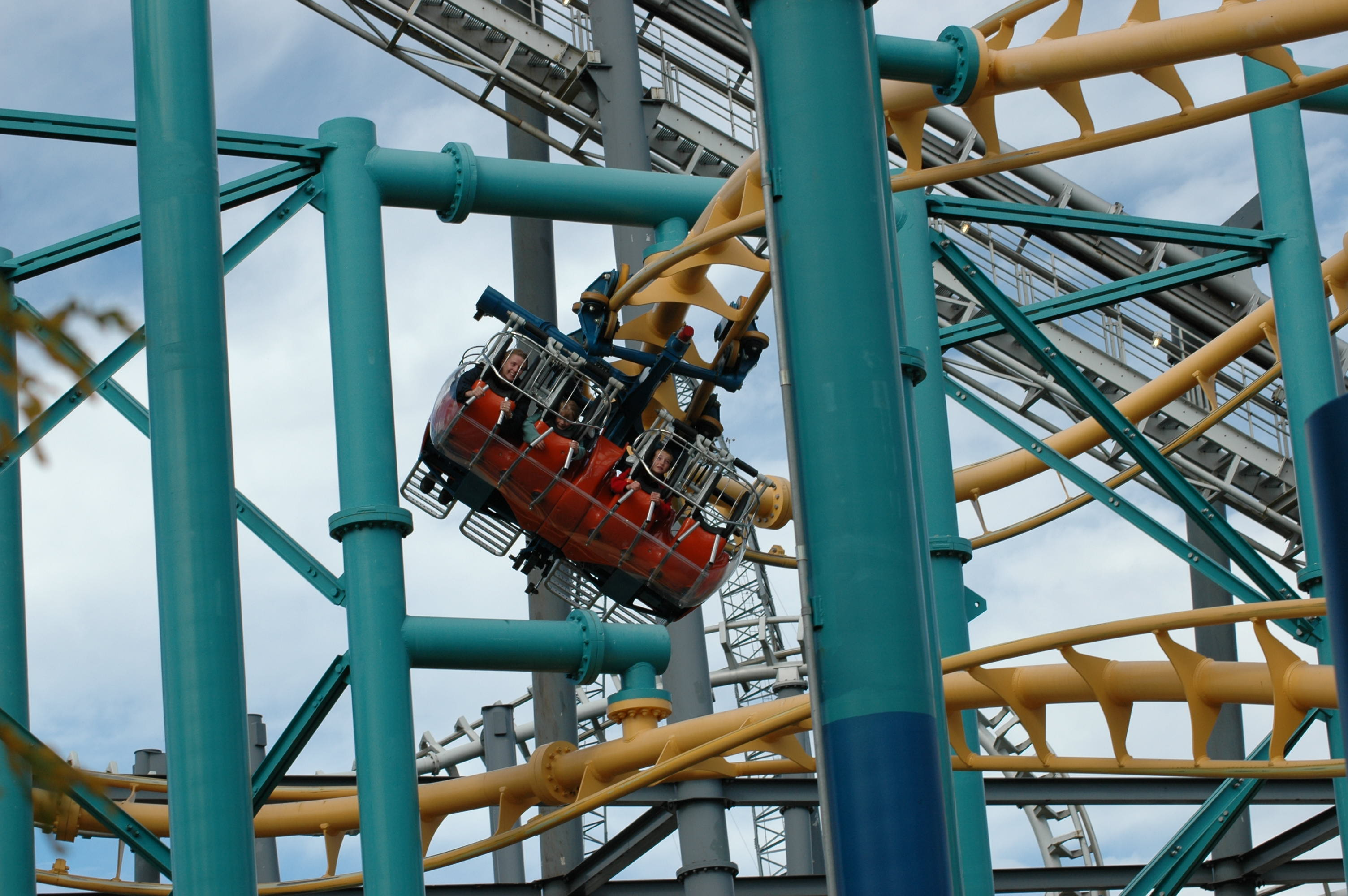

Canada's Wonderland
- Location: Canada's Wonderland
- Park section: Grande World Exposition of 1890
- Coordinates: 43.8408°N 79.5396°W
- Status: Removed
- Opening date: May 2, 2004
- Closing date: November 2, 2024

General statistics
- Type: Steel
- Manufacturer: Zamperla
- Designer: Ingenieurbüro Stengel GmbH
- Lift/launch system: Spiral Lift
- Height: 15.3 m (50 ft)
- Length: 390.99 m (1,282.8 ft)
- Speed: 41.4 km/h (25.7 mph)
- Inversions: 2
- Duration: 1:04
- Height restriction: 54 in (137 cm)
- Trains: 7 trains with a single car; riders arranged 4 across in a single row for a total of 4 riders per train
- Fast Lane was available
- Time Warp at RCDB

Time Warp, formerly known as Tomb Raider: The Ride, was a flying roller coaster located at Canada's Wonderland. Manufactured by Zamperla, the ride opened to the public on May 2, 2004. The ride gave its final ride on November 2, 2024 after 20 years of life, becoming the second roller coaster in Canada’s Wonderland’s history to be removed. It was removed before the 2025 season began.

== Ride description ==
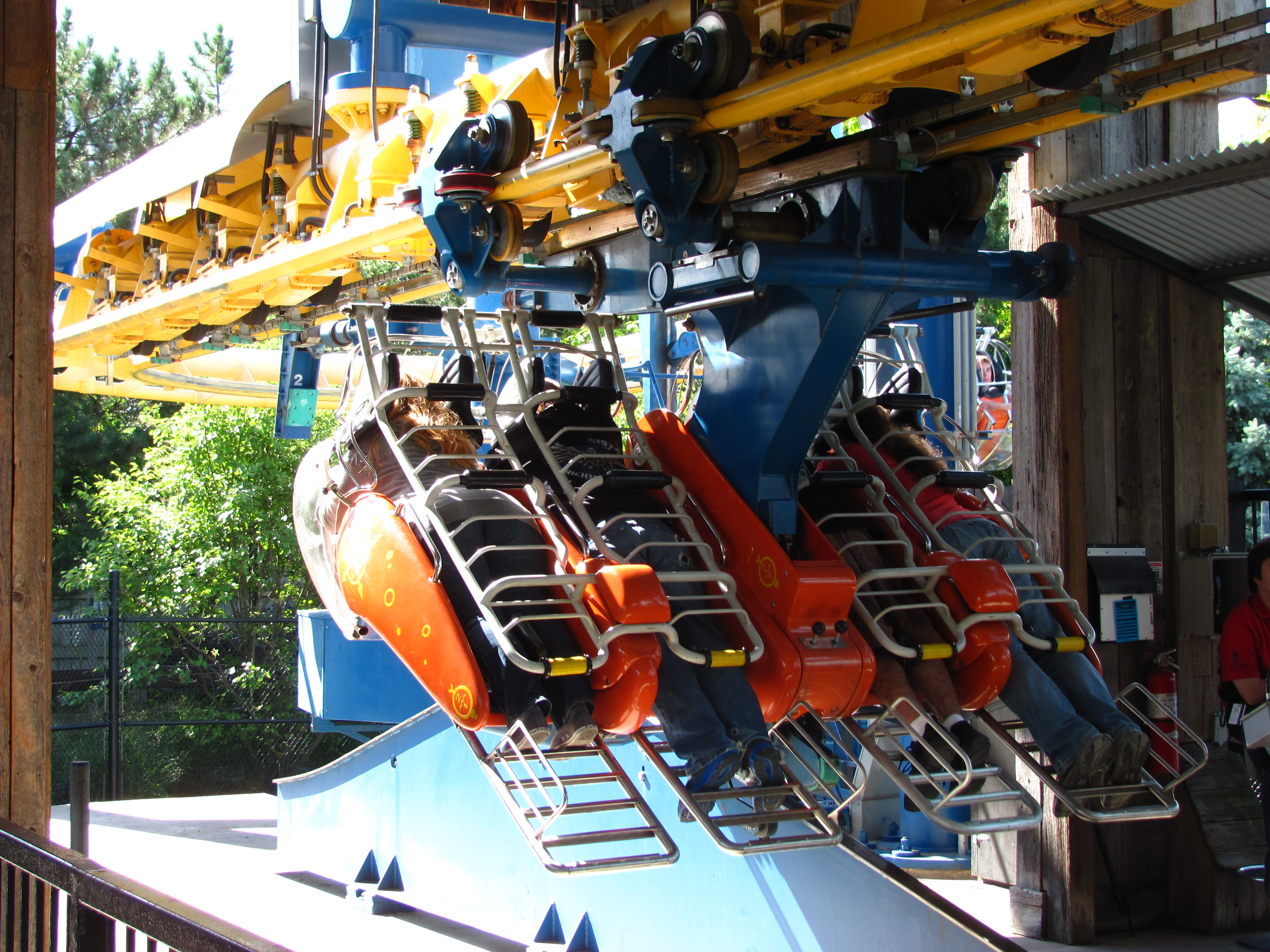
Riders were loaded into four-person cars, which rotate to face the ground when the ride begins.

The ride commenced by loading passengers into a four-person car and rotating the cars facing the ground. The vehicles proceed with a horizontal lift and got pushed forward so that they engage with the rotating lift mechanism. The vehicles ascended into a spiral lift that gave riders a 360-degree view of their surroundings.

Once vehicles reached the top, they dove down and accelerated before making a quick turn to the left and into the first in-line twist. The ride then turned to the right and into the first set of block brakes that slowed the vehicles, before making a small dip downward and another right turn into the second in-line twist. After a quick turn to the left, the vehicles passed into the second set of brakes and then made another diving left turn. There were a few quick turns before the vehicles return to the station. Once the riders were lowered to the standing position, the restraints were unlocked and vehicles were unloaded.

The ride drew criticism for several reasons. The restraint system was described as uncomfortable and prone to causing "headbanging." The transitions between the in-line twists, the turns, and the dives have all were criticized as rough. The ride's low capacity due to the complexity of the full body restraint design and the four-passenger trains have were sources of criticism.

The ride was abruptly removed from the park's app in February 2025 without explanation. On March 13, 2025, Canada’s Wonderland announced Time Warp was being retired. Canada’s Wonderland last operating day of the 2024 season was on November 2, 2024, which also turned out to be Time Warp’s final operating day.

The ride was quickly demolished and scrapped in late March 2025, all before the park opened to the public for the 2025 season.

=== Theme ===
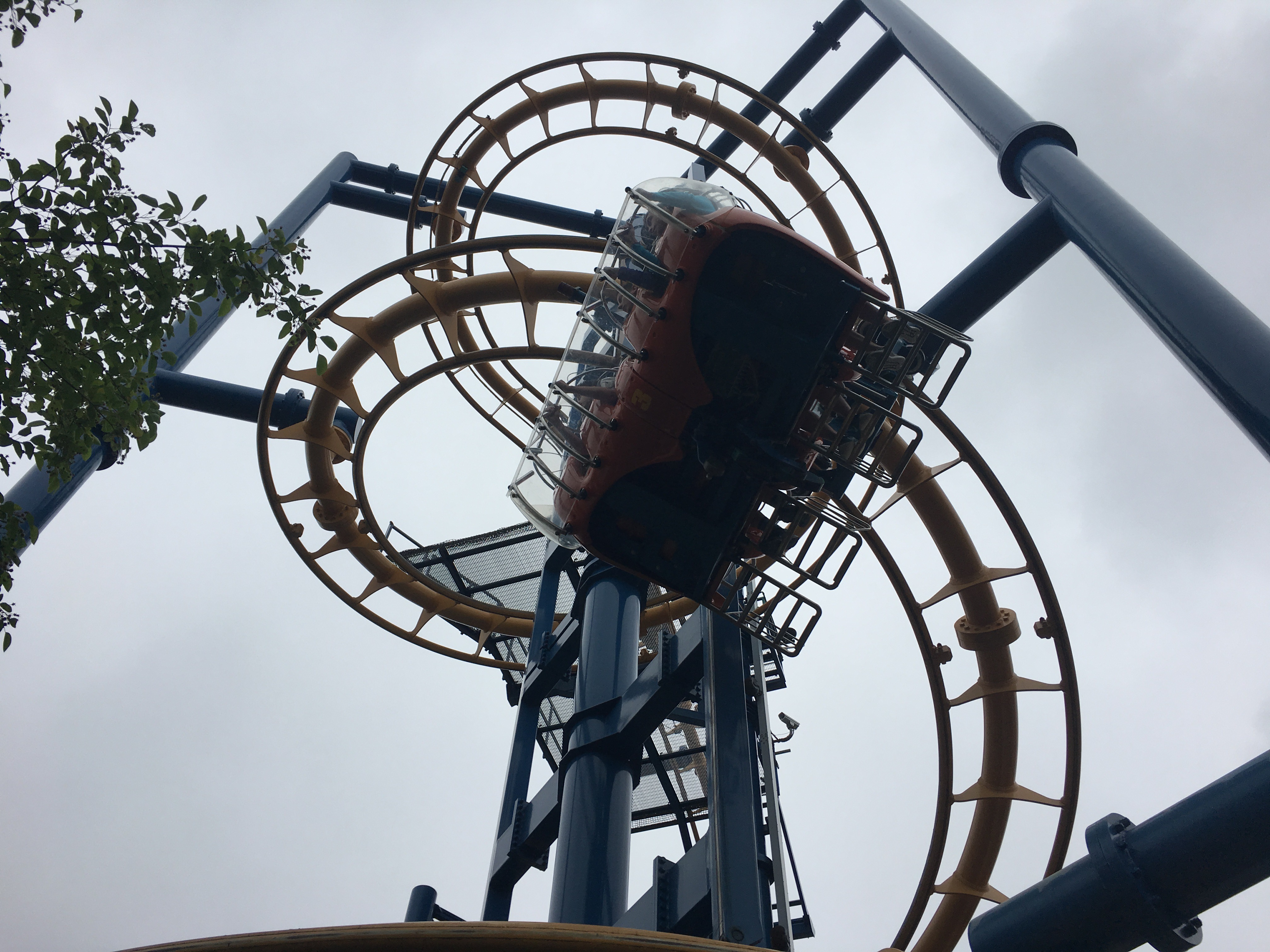
One of Time Warp's cars ascending its spiral lift hill.

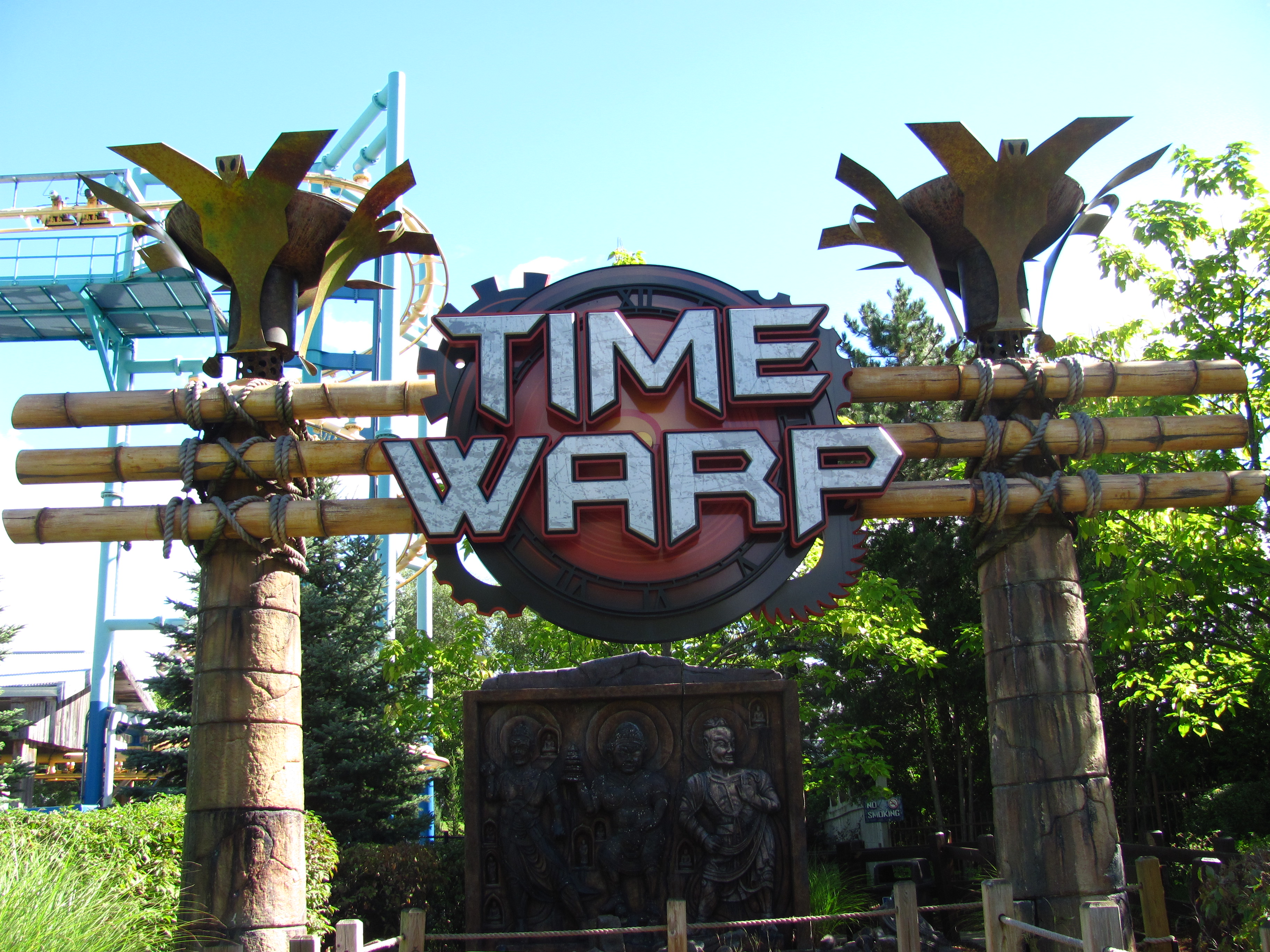
Time Warp's entrance arch

The roller coaster was originally themed to the 2003 Paramount Pictures film Lara Croft Tomb Raider: The Cradle of Life. When the ride opened in 2004, the ride's entrance queue featured theming and special effects to resemble an ancient tomb. The entrance sign was mounted on bamboo sticks and stone columns with propane torches. Next to the entrance was a tent that resembled Lara Croft's base with two motorcycles. Beyond the entrance were Chinese stone soldiers akin to the Terracotta Army, as well as a stone wall with images resembling deities found in ancient Buddhist and Hindu artworks. The queue and exit were guided by rope fences. Audio of bat sounds looped while riders waited in the station.

The ride area was filled with a rumbling sound that got louder to entice riders. As this happened, flame torches would enlarge. At night, the station's floodlights turned red.

After its opening, especially after Cedar Fair acquired Canada's Wonderland, many thematic elements were removed, including the tent and propane torches. The Chinese soldiers inside the queue were been removed, but the stone mural was still present until the ride's closure in 2024. The rope in the queue lines were replaced by wooden planks.

== See also ==
- Flying roller coaster
