= Sledge Hammer (ride) =

Ride at Wonderland, Vaughan, Canada

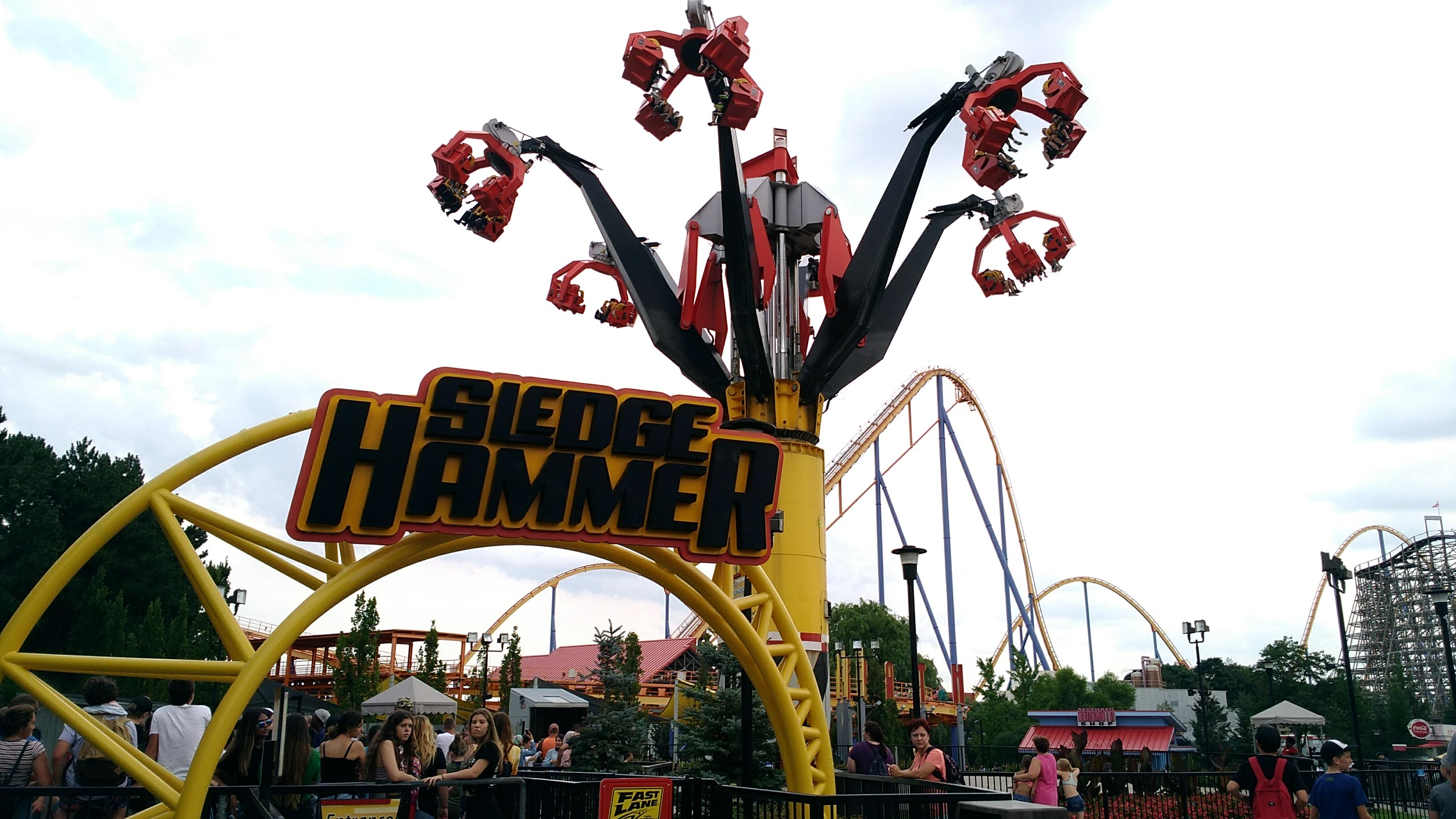
- Entrance to Sledge Hammer in 2018

Canada's Wonderland
- Area: Action Zone
- Coordinates: 43°50′22.92″N 79°32′26.36″W
- Status: Operating
- Opening date: May 3, 2003

Ride statistics
- Attraction type: Giant Jumper
- Manufacturer: HUSS Park Attractions
- Model: Giant Jump 2
- Vehicle type: 6 "claw" like vehicles are placed around the base of the ride and consist of 8 seats per "claw"
- Vehicles: 6
- Riders per vehicle: 8
- Duration: 2003–2010: Approximately 1 minute and 20 seconds 2011–present: 2 minutes
- Height restriction: 137 cm (4 ft 6 in)
- Fast Lane available

Sledge Hammer is a ride at Canada's Wonderland. The Huss ride was opened to the public on May 4, 2003, and continues to operate today. Sledge Hammer is also the world's first and only 'giant jumping machine'. The ride has had serious mechanical issues, causing repeated closures.

== History ==
When the ride was first opened during the 2003 season, the ride attracted many guests and was generally quite reliable. Since the mid-2010s, the ride has been hampered with many problems, such that it regularly closes down. Canada's Wonderland has not stated what is causing the issues with the ride.

== Structure ==
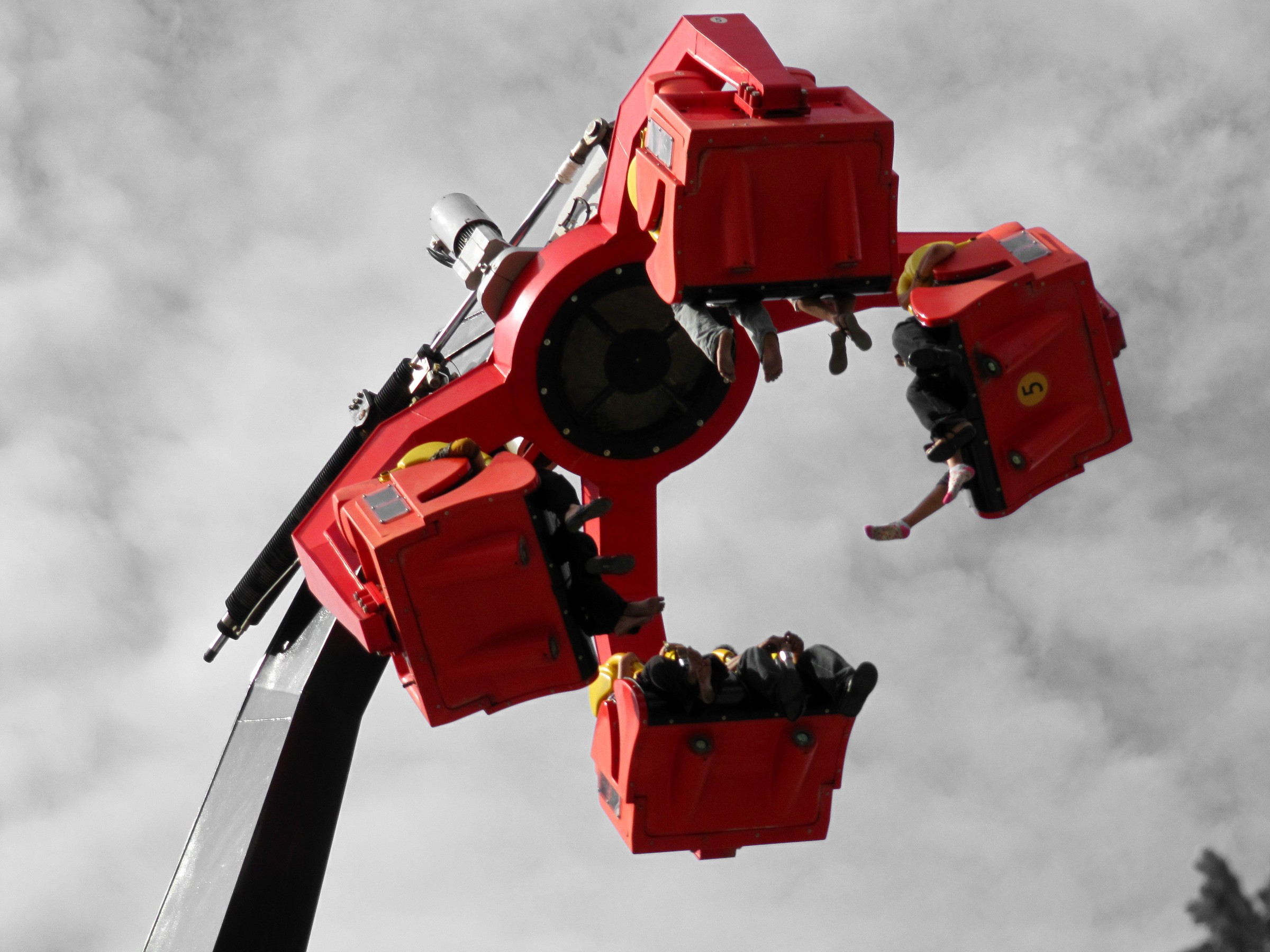
The underside of the ride's "claw," a component of the Sledge Hammer where the riders sit.

Sledge Hammer is mainly made out of four different parts. The first part is the main "tower". This is where most of the machinery is located (inside) and where everything is connected to each other. The second part, is the "claws" (there are six of them). These are where riders sit during the ride. The third part is the "arms" (once again, there are six of them). These are what hold the "claws" to the main "tower" and allow the "claws" to go up and down. The fourth part is a grey "block like" piece that hold everything together and helps get the "claws" up and down.

== Ride experience ==
=== 2003–2010 ===
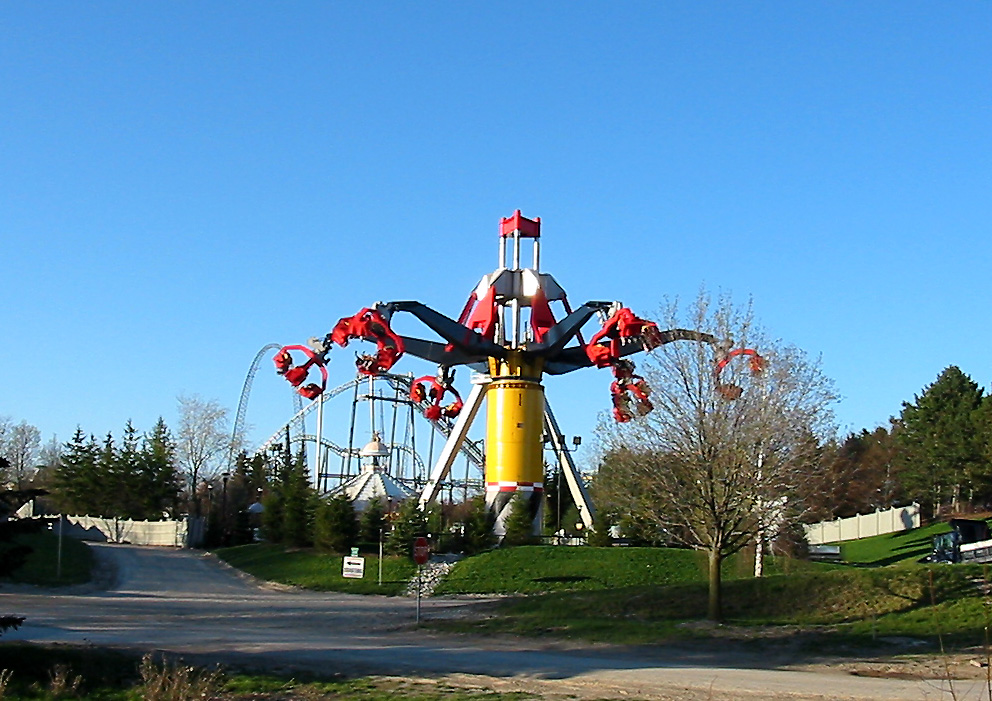
Sledge Hammer in May 2007.

First, riders take a seat in one of the eight seats inside one of six "claws", each attached to an arm in turn connected to a central pillar. Once the operators say that it is safe to proceed, all six claws raise off the ground and instantly begin to spin around the centre pillar holding the claw arms. Simultaneously, the claws rotate at the point at which they are connected to their respective arms. About 10 seconds into the ride, the six "claws" instantly shoot upwards. Then, about 13 seconds later, the "claws" shoot right back down to where the ride began. Around 35 seconds of the operation of the ride, once again, the "claws" shoot back up. 10 seconds later, instead of the "claws" going straight back down, they go down only halfway and stay there for about 2 or 3 seconds. After 2 or 3 seconds, the "claws" return to the bottom of the ride. Then, for one final time, the "claws" shoot back to the top of the ride, then instantly shoot back down. The ride then slows down and return to its "loading position" when riders exit and enter the ride. One cycle lasted about 1 minute and 20 seconds.

=== 2011–present ===
Just like the cycle from before 2010, riders take a seat inside one of six "claws" located around the central tower. Once the operators give the "all clear", the claws raise off the ground and begin to spin around the central tower. The first (very small) change in the cycle comes when the claws "shoot" upwards at the 8 second mark instead of the 10 second mark. The second change is when instead of the claws coming down at around the 12 second mark, the claws stay up for a full 28 seconds before coming back down to the bottom of the ride. Next, the time between the "claws" spinning at the bottom of the ride and going back up is very similar to the old cycle. The fourth change comes when instead of the "claws" staying at the top of the tower (second time) for 10 seconds and then going halfway down for 3 seconds followed by the claws returning to the bottom of the tower, the "claws" now stay at the top for about 25 seconds and then go straight back down without stopping in the middle. Then, the time between the "claws" on the ground to the time of going back to the top for a third time is also similar. Finally, once the claws reach the top, they instantly "shoot" right back down (just like the same as the old cycle). One cycle now lasts about 2 minutes.
