= Enterprise (ride) =

Amusement ride model

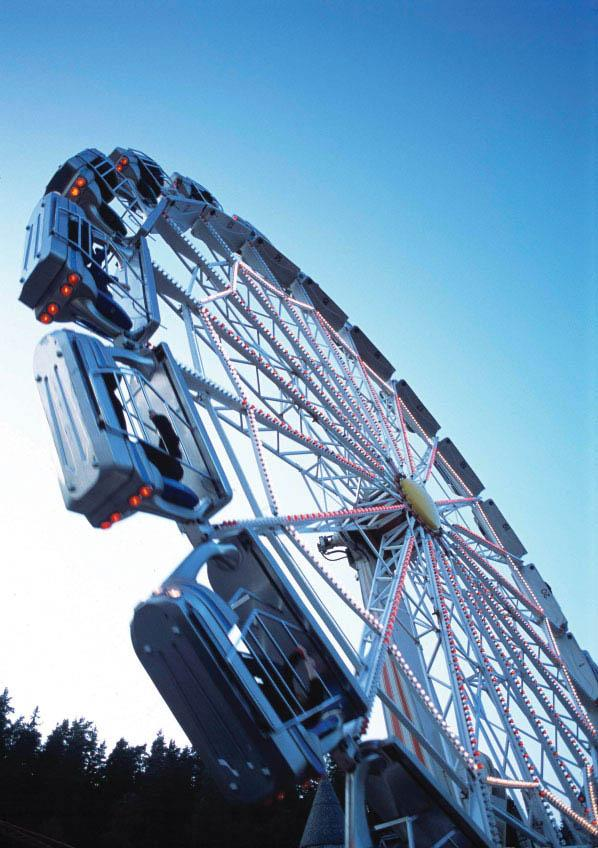
- "Enterprise" at TusenFryd in 2005 (Norway). Opened: 1988 and closed: 2006
- First manufactured: 1972
- No. of installations: About 64
- Manufacturer: HUSS Park Attractions
- G force: 3
- Vehicle type: Gondola
- Vehicles: 20
- Riders per vehicle: 2
- Restraint Style: Cage

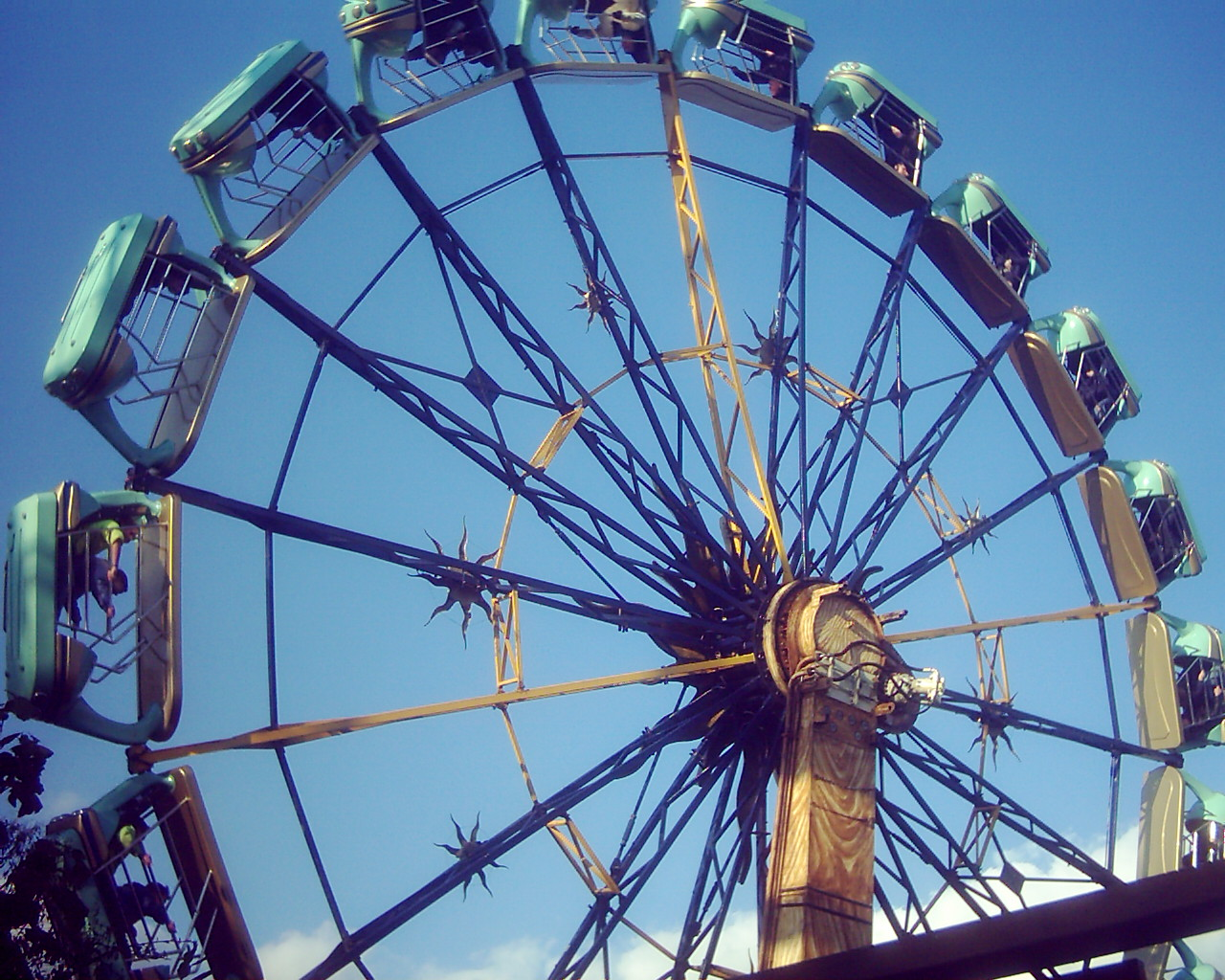
"Zodiac" at Thorpe Park in 2003

The Enterprise is an amusement ride, manufactured primarily by HUSS Park Attractions and Anton Schwarzkopf beginning in 1972. The HUSS ride was an adaptation and improvement of a design produced earlier that year by Schwarzkopf, with an increased passenger capacity. Despite not owning the original incarnation of the ride, HUSS was issued the patent.

Although Schwarzkopf was the first to build the more standard Enterprise, the overall design was actually predated by another ride, the Passat, which first opened in 1964. This is only considered a precursor, however, as the mechanism used to lift the arm up and down as well as the overall look of the ride is much different from a typical Enterprise.

The ride is named after USS Enterprise from the TV series Star Trek. The backdrop is decorated with space-themed art and a silhouette of the starship Enterprise.

Enterprises are manufactured by HUSS, Schwarzkopf, and Heinz Fähtz; all sharing the name Enterprise. Both trailer and park versions have been created and are in use.

In 2015, Italian manufacturer Zamperla introduced the Endeavour, a new ride billed as being based on the Enterprise. This ride mainly differs in its seating and restraint configuration, which is floorless with over-the-shoulder restraints.

== Design and operation ==
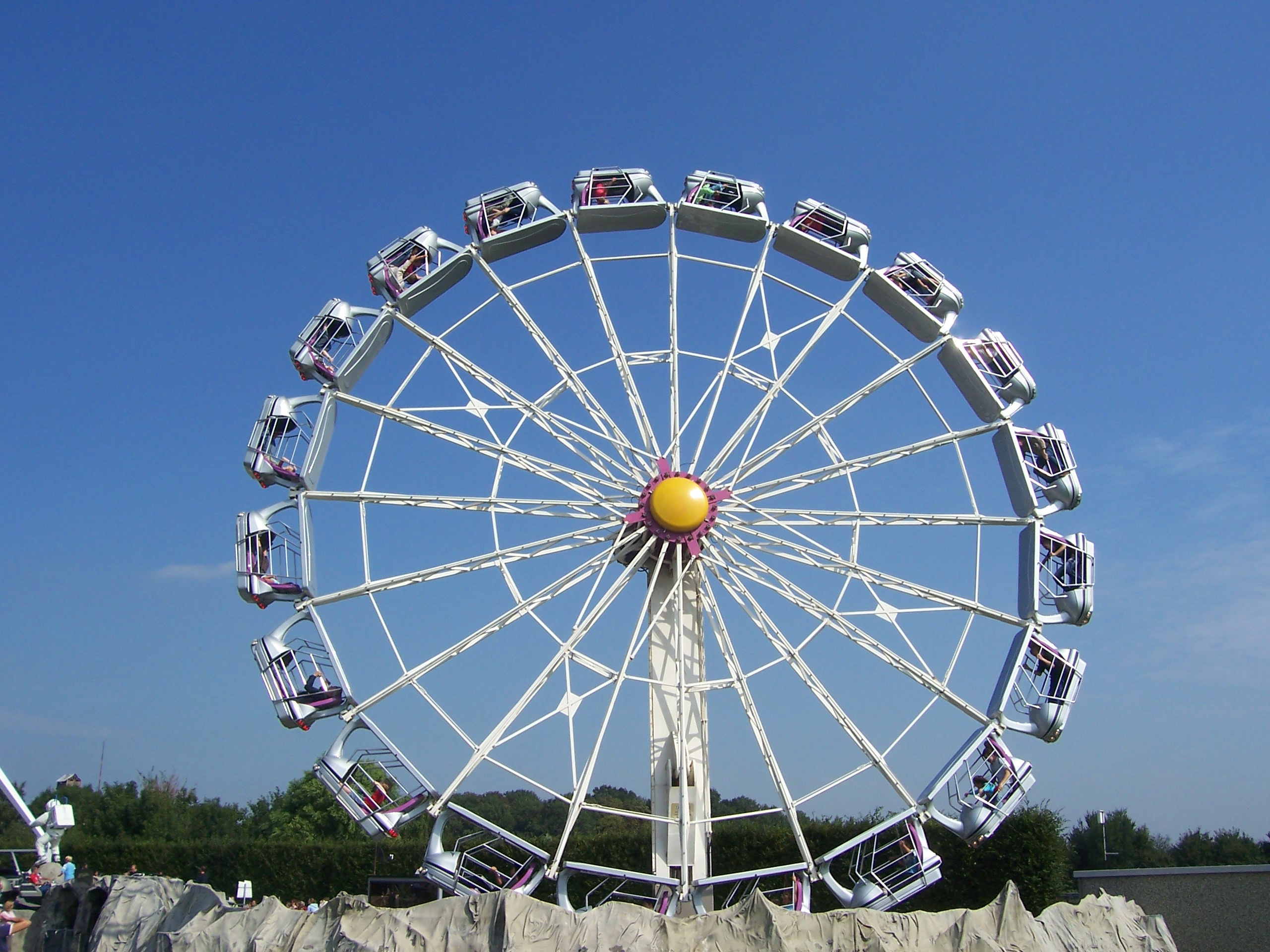
The Kwal at Drievliet (Netherlands).

In the ride, up to two people sit in one of 20 gondolas arranged in a circle, one in front of the other. The ride moves clockwise, dispelling a slight amount of centrifugal force. A hydraulically powered arm underneath the ride then raises and tilts the frame so that the ride is rotating at 87° from the horizontal, transforming the ride from a horizontal experience to a nearly vertical one.

On most Enterprise models, there are no safety restraints inside the enclosed gondolas; the force applied to the riders is sufficient to keep them pinned in their seats. However, some models have been fitted with seat belts. Riders usually hold onto the bars surrounding them for extra safety. these bars are usually padded, but on models such as the Orbit at California’s Great America, the gripping bars along the side of the cabin are Velcro wrapped in a material that distinguishes them from the other bars that enclosed the gondola. Most parks and carnivals require riders to be at least 48 in (120 cm) tall, though it is not uncommon to see restrictions as much as 54 in (140 cm) or more. The transportable version of the ride racks onto two trailers, the first carrying the wheel, arm, and drive systems while the second is loaded with the gondolas, platforms, and any additional equipment. The first trailer also acts as the base of the ride while in operation.

== Variants ==
=== Passat ===
Much like any other Enterprise-type ride, the Passat has a number of caged gondolas, in this case 12, that sit around a circular frame, which, in turn, sits on the end of an arm. But what makes this ride different from an Enterprise is that the center of the frame, as well as the end of the arm, is fitted around an arc-shaped pillar, which is used to raise and lower the arm in order to tilt it from horizontal to vertical. The earliest known machine, Passat, was originally built by German show family Winter, who started traveling it to funfairs in 1964. Later machines were built by Klaus and possibly Heinz Fähtz. Although the whereabouts of these rides are mostly unknown, there is one, known as Super Passat, which is currently believed to be in storage.

=== Giant Enterprise/SkyLab ===
In the early 1980s, HUSS produced a larger version of the Enterprise called the SkyLab. It features 15–20 four-seater gondolas (up to four riders per seat) and had a diameter of approximately 60 feet (18 m) or greater. Most SkyLabs have been dismantled; however, there is one known model still operating: Cyclone at Parque Del Café in Montenegro, Quindio, Colombia.

=== UFO ===
HUSS used the basis of the Enterprise for another ride called the UFO. This ride was similar in operation, but the cars did not swing freely and riders stood up facing the center of the ride. Similarly to most Enterprise rides, there are no restraints due to the centrifugal force experienced on the ride. This ride is no longer in production.

=== Fly Away ===
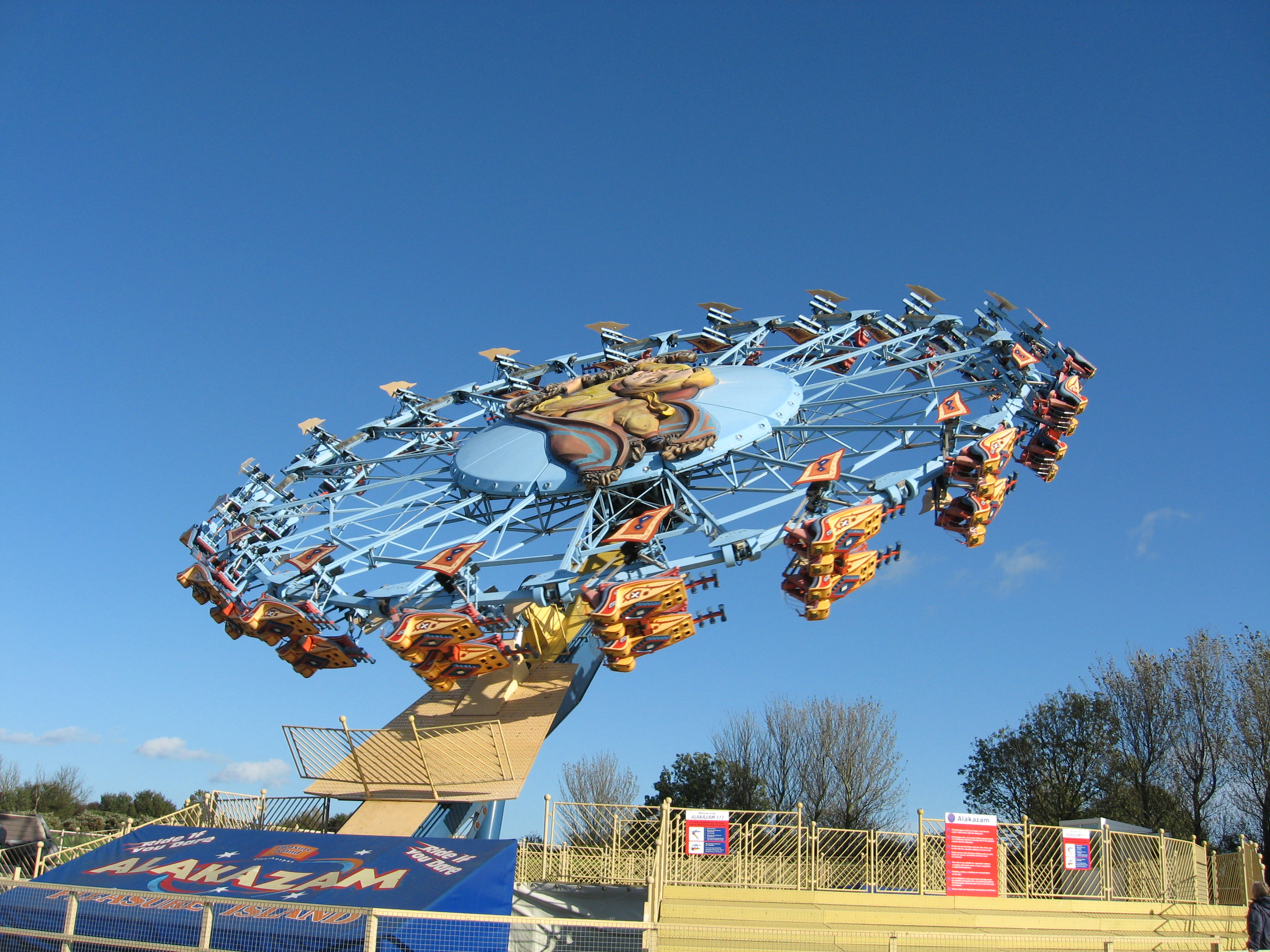
Alakazam at Pleasure Island, Cleethorpes, a Fly Away variation of the ride with a custom harness that gives the effect of riding a magic carpet

HUSS also used the design of the Enterprise for a newer attraction called Fly Away. In this version, riders lay on their stomachs to simulate the feeling of flying. This version also has the capability to spin riders forwards or backwards.

=== Schwarzkopf ===
The Schwarzkopf versions of the Enterprise have either 16 or 21 gondolas, thus having a different diameter of the wheel. The gondolas are also smaller than the HUSS version. Originally, the gondolas were produced in-house; they were later replaced by gondolas manufactured separately by Reverchon.

=== Heinz Fähtz ===
Heinz Fähtz manufactured some 16-gondola Enterprises. The only known operating park model is at Six Flags Darien Lake, installed in 1981. Another portable ride is traveled in New Zealand by Mahons Amusements, loading on 2 trailers complete with backflash.

=== Emiliana Luna Park ===
The Emiliana Luna Park version of the Enterprise has 20 gondolas. One Enterprise manufactured by Emiliana Luna Park, named Kehrä, is located at Linnanmäki amusement park in Finland.

=== Senyo Kogyo Co. ===
One model is known to be operating currently at Yokohama Cosmo World. Super Planet is comparable to the Huss Giant Enterprise models, as they both feature similar gondolas that accommodate four riders in two seats. Unlike the Huss version which has only 15 gondolas, the Senyo Kogyo version has 20, which allows for a total of 80 passengers. This makes it one of the largest Enterprise rides in size and capacity.

== Appearances ==
Note: The Schwarzkopf Park Model versions of the ride are indicated with "(SDC)" following the park or operator name. The Heinz Fähtz Enterprise is marked "(HF)".

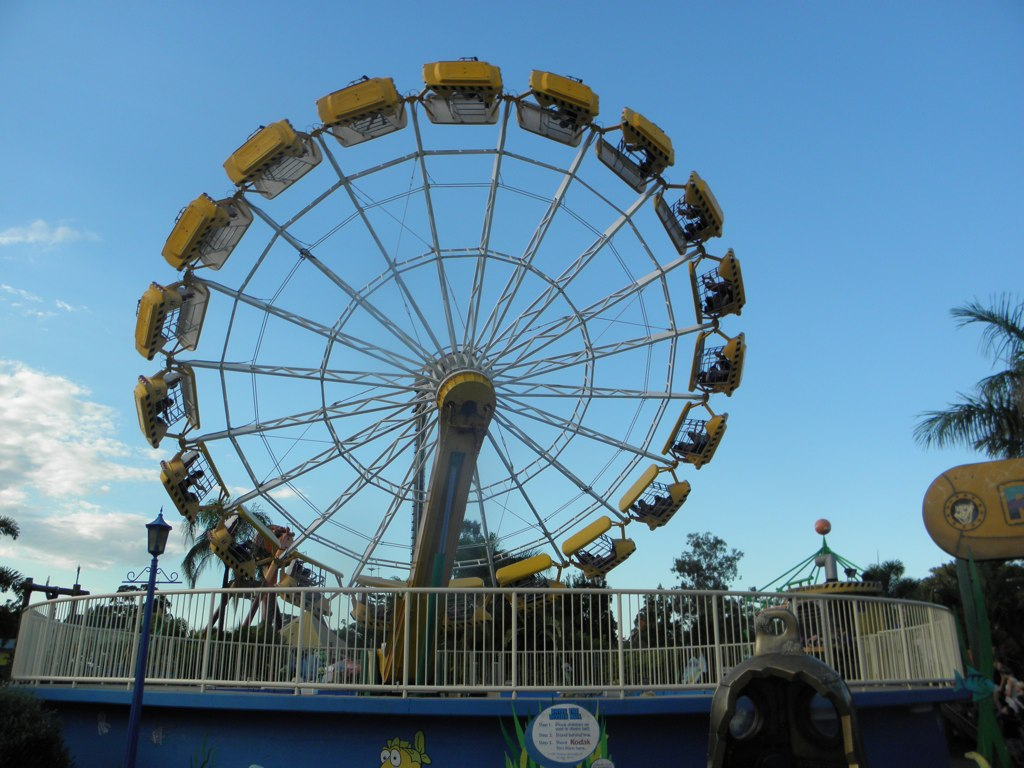
The Reef Diver at Dreamworld.

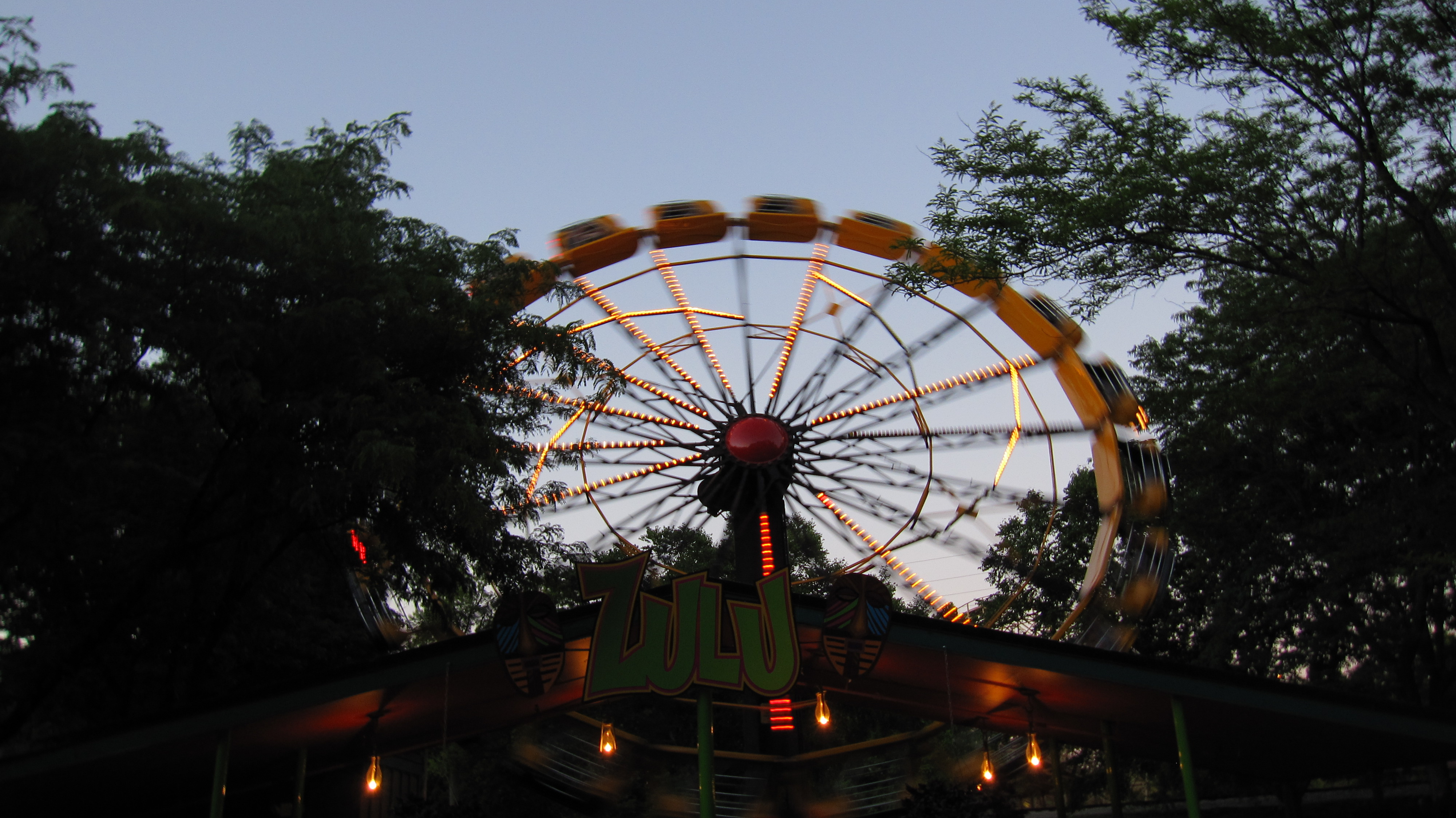
Zulu at Worlds of Fun.

== Current rides ==
- Argentina – At least two; Enterprise I at Parque de la Ciudad and Enterprise II (SDC) at Parque de la Ciudad
- Australia – At least three; The Enterprise at Luna Park Melbourne, one traveling model, and a third under refurbishment, location unknown.
- Canada – At least two; Enterprise at Playland, The STORM, at Calaway Park, and several portable models
- Colombia – At least one; Cyclone at Parque Nacional del Café
- Chile - Super Hero (Fly Away) at Fantasilandia
- Denmark – At least two; Enterprise at Bakken (disassembled and is to be renovated and sold) and 'Solhjulet' at Sommerland Syd
- Egypt – One in Dream Park; largest amusement park in Egypt and the Middle East
- Estonia – At least one; a traveling model owned by Tivoli Tuur. Got into fire in 2007; 41 were injured.
- Finland – Two; Enterprise (Huss) at PowerPark amusement park (from 2019) and Kehrä (Emiliana Luna Park) at Linnanmäki amusement park (from 2009).
- France – At least one Enterprise; Gravity at Kingoland.
- Germany – One travelling Enterprise; Mondlift owned by Zehle., plus a few stationary Enterprises in different amusement parks – all manufactured by Huss.
- ’’’ Iraq’’’ — ‘’Enterprise’’ (Huss) at Baghdad Island.
- Italy - Enterprise Famiglia bellucci "Puglia" (HUSS) ... (Trailer Mode) Year 2014
- India − At least five; three at Mumbai (2 at Six Flags, 1 at Play Land), 1 in New Delhi at Essel World, one at Queensland, and 1 at Hydrabad at Musky Mountain.
- Nigeria – One of its kind Enterprise at Hi Impact Planet Amusement park & Resort, Lagos Ibadan Expressway Ibafo (HF)
- Netherlands – At least four; Enterprise (SDC) at Attractiepark Slagharen, G-Force at Walibi Holland, Kwal at Drievliet and Tarantula Magica at Avonturenpark Hellendoorn.
- New Zealand – One traveling; Enterprise at Mahons Amusements (HF)
- Poland - One; Phoenix at Legendia Śląskie Wesołe Miasteczko, Chorzów.
- Serbia – Enterprise (SDC-Italy), owned by Lukic family, travel model, 1984
- ‘‘‘Thailand‘‘‘ — ‘’Enterprise (Huss) at Siam Park City, opened in 2007, relocated from an amusement park in Brunei)
- United Kingdom At least two; Zodiac at Thorpe Park, and a traveling Enterprise owned by Funfair Props.
- United States of America – At least seven; Centennial Screamer at Lagoon Amusement Park; Enterprise at Dorney Park, Washington State Fair, the Strates Shows traveling railway carnival, and Murphy Bros. Exposition; Flyin' Tiger at Blue Bayou and Dixie Landin'(standing with not operating due to park closure in 2025); The Orbit (SDC) at California's Great America (formerly known as Orleans Orbit, latest closure date, 2027); Silver Bullet at Six Flags Darien Lake (HF); and Zulu at Worlds of Fun.

=== Past appearances ===
The following Enterprise rides at the following amusement parks are now defunct.

Note: The Schwarzkopf Park Model versions of the ride are indicated with "(SDC)" following the park or operator name.

- Alakazam (Fly-Away) at Pleasure Island, Cleethorpes (2002-2016) moved to Fantasilandia, Chile
- Apple Turnover (SDC) at Kings Dominion (1976–1991)
- Black Widow's Web at Lightwater Valley (2001-2017)
- Cíclope at Reino Aventura (1982-1994)
- Cyclops at Hersheypark (1980-2002) relocated to Callaway Park and open in 2004 and still operates as the Storm.
- Enterprise at Camden Park (closed in 1993)
- Enterprise at Elitch Gardens (1984-1987)
- Enterprise at Loudon Castle, Scotland (?–2010), closed when the park went defunct, relocated to Avonturenpark Hellendoorn an open in 2012, still operates today as Tarantula Magica.
- Enterprise at Rocky Point Amusement Park (closed in 1994, relocated to Blue Bayou and Dixie Landing from 1999 until 2025 when the park closed.)
- Enterprise at Lake Compounce (1986-2015), moved to Kennywood and operated through 2020.
- Enterprise at Boblo Island Amusement Park (1980-1993, closed when the park went defunct in 1993.)
- Enterprise at Parque de Atracciones de Vizcaya (closed in 1990)
- Enterprise (Huss Portable Model) at Six Flags Great Adventure (1975–1977)
- Spin Meister (SDC) at Six Flags Great Adventure (1979–2005), originally named Enterprise.
- Enterprise (Huss Portable Model) at Tusenfryd (1988–2006). Moved to Lindströms Tivoli in Sweden (2006), and to a Swedish showman, Håkan Skogh (2006–2009). From 2010 owner Troost-Spel in the Netherlands.
- Enterprise (later renamed Inferno) at Walibi Belgium (1977-2010)
- Enterprise at Wasalandia (1988–1996)
- Enterprise at Mariner's Landing, Wildwood, NJ (1977-1999)
- Enterprise at Oaks Amusement Park
- Enterprise at Fun Forest, Seattle Center (closed ca. 2009)
- Enterprise at Valleyfair (closed in 2016)
- Enterprise (SDC) at Tykkimäki (1999-2017)
- Enterprise at Kentucky Kingdom (closed in 2017)
- Enterprise at Casino Pier (1975-2012; destroyed by Hurricane Sandy), reportedly the first Enterprise in the United States.
- Enterprise at Alton Towers (1984–2022)
- Enterprise at All-Russia Exhibition Centre (1976–2016)
- Highland Fling (SDC) at Six Flags St. Louis (1977-2017)
- La Turbina (SDC) at Parque de Atracciones de Madrid
- Loop Trainer Flying Machine (SDC) at Knott's Berry Farm (1976–1989, relocated to SLAGHAREN and renamed enterprise in 1993, one of the only SCHWARZKOPF enterprise model still operating.)
- Nightwing at Six Flags New England (closed in 2008)
- ’’’ ‘’Orbit’’ (SDC) at California’s Great America (1976-2027) known as Orleans Orbit while previously located in Orleans Place, willclose with the park in 2027
- Orbit (SDC) at Six Flags Great America (closed in 2016)
- The Orbiter at Canada's Wonderland (SkyLab) (1981-2018)
- Reactor at Six Flags Magic Mountain (1977–1993) (originally named Enterprise from 1977 to 1987)
- Reef Diver at Dreamworld (1983 -2014) (originally named Enterprise from 1983 to 2002)
- Rodeo Round-Up at Frontier City (closed in 2015)
- Scream Weaver at Carowinds (1979-2024) originally opened to the park as Meteorite in 1979.
- Silver Bullet at Geauga Lake (1976–2004) (originally named Enterprise from 1976 to 1996)
- Skylab at Great Escape (closed in 2001)
- Skylab at Kings Island (1986–1997, relocated to Parque Del Café in 2004 and renamed Ciclinn (Cyclone) and still operates today.)
- Sky Loop at Luna Park, Tel Aviv (SkyLab, previously travelled in Germany in 1979–1990)
- Space Wheel at Ocean Park Hong Kong (1984–2015)
- Super Planet (Senyo Kogyo) at Yokohama Cosmo World. (1989–2025)
- Vertigo at Alabama Adventure (1998-2011; in storage 2003-2006)
- Volcano at Kennywood (1978-2015; 2016-2020), originally named Enterprise. Structure replaced with former Lake Compounce model from 2016-2020.
- Wagon Wheel (SDC) at Six Flags Fiesta Texas (1996–2011) (originally at Six Flags Over Texas from 1977 to 1995 as Spinnaker)
- Wheelie (SDC) at Six Flags Over Georgia (1977–2012), removed and closed to make way for SkyScreamer. Moved to Fun Spot America Theme Parks Orlando park from 2013-2024.
- Witches' Wheel (Huss) at Cedar Point (1977-2018)

== Incidents ==
- August 13, 1981: Seven people were killed and 16 were injured at the Hamburger Dom, located at the Heiligengeistfeld Fair Grounds in Hamburg, Germany. As the Skylab's height increased, the ride's gondolas came into contact with a nearby crane – which had previously done repairs on the "Katapult" roller coaster. The crane ripped some of the gondolas from the ride, and the victims plunged from heights of up to 15 metres (49 ft). Six of the deceased were killed from the impact after falling, while the seventh succumbed to their injuries at a hospital. Among the deceased are Sigrid Christiansen (18) and Gabi Littkewitz (18).
- October 17, 1983: At the Texas State Fair, in Dallas, Texas, an 18-year-old boy was killed and several bystanders were injured when a gondola fell off the ride.
- 1993: More than 50 people were injured following a hydraulic malfunction at Camden Park in Huntington, West Virginia.
- September 22, 2001: Two teenagers sustained minor injuries when one support on a gondola broke on Zodiac at Thorpe Park in Surrey, England. The gondola repeatedly hit the decking at the bottom of the ride whilst the operator attempted to stop the ride. The incident was taken to court, where the judge criticised the length of time it took to shut down the ride after an abnormal noise had been noticed. The park was fined £65,000 and made to pay an extra £35,000 in costs.
- May 18, 2007: An Estonian Enterprise owned by Tivoli Tuur and operating at a carnival in Rakvere caught fire. It was in motion, with riders aboard, when the fire suddenly ignited at approximately 11:00 p.m. It was stopped and evacuated, but not before injuries were sustained by the riders. 31 patients were hospitalized with first and second degree burns, with an additional 10 admitted and checked for possible smoke inhalation. Six burn victims required further treatment, with all six released from the hospital by May 23. The fire damaged the ride's electrical systems and five of the 20 gondolas. Preliminary investigations found no evidence to conclusively conclude what had caused the incident, but the owner suggested it might have been arson.
- February 17, 2023: An incident occurred involving the Enterprise Ride at the Florida State Fair. The ride unexpectedly stopped while remaining in a vertical position, leaving some riders suspended upside down. Several riders reported minor injuries, including bruises, as a result of the malfunction. The management of the Florida State Fair stated that the activation of safety mechanisms led to the ride's shutdown, and they initiated an investigation to determine the cause of the incident.
