= Orbiter (Canada's Wonderland) =

Amusement ride at Canada's Wonderland

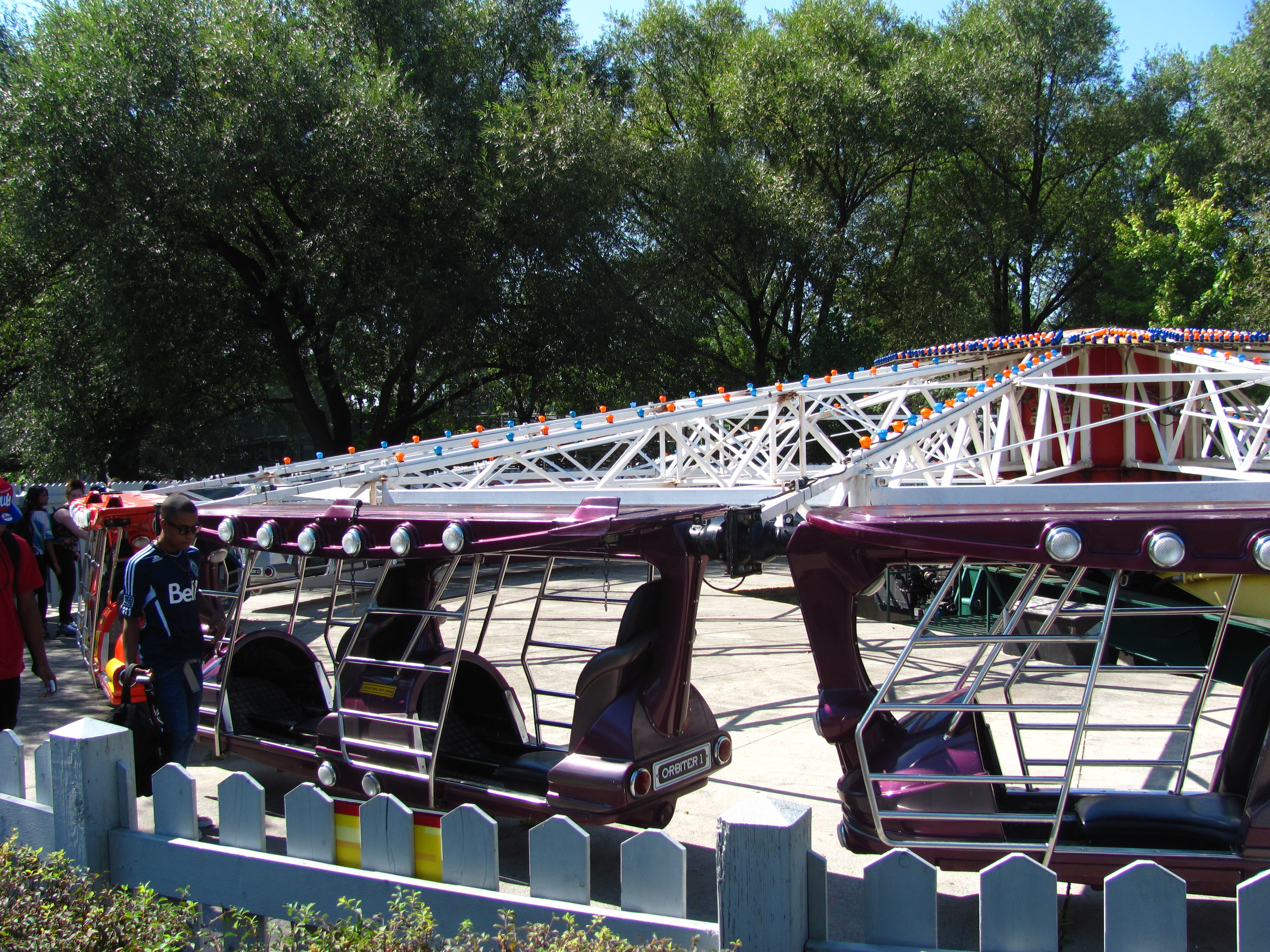

Canada's Wonderland
- Area: Action Zone
- Coordinates: 43.839944°N 79.54150°W
- Status: Removed
- Opening date: 1981
- Closing date: 2018

Ride statistics
- Attraction type: SkyLab
- Manufacturer: HUSS Park Attractions
- Capacity: 1200 riders per hour
- Vehicles: 15
- Riders per vehicle: 2
- Duration: 1 minute and 53 seconds
- Height restriction: 137 cm (4 ft 6 in)
- Fast Lane Was Available

Orbiter (formerly known as Sol Loco) was a HUSS SkyLab at Canada's Wonderland in Ontario, Canada. The ride opened in 1981 for the park's first operating season. The ride closed in 2006 and was partially dismantled but was re-built and re-opened later that season following the sale of Paramount's amusement park chain to Cedar Fair. The ride last operated during the 2018 season and has been completely dismantled and removed as of February 2019.

== History ==
When Orbiter first opened in 1981, it was called Sol Loco and featured a Mexican theme. In 2002, the ride's name was changed to what it is known as today, Orbiter. After 25 years in operation, Orbiter was closed during the 2006 operating season. The ride had been removed from the park map and was surrounded by signs stating "Please excuse our appearance as we are preparing for your future enjoyment". During this closure period, several parts of the ride were dismantled including the ride carriages. This led many people to wonder if the ride would be demolished completely. That same year, it was announced that Cedar Fair would buy all Paramount Parks. Later on in the season, the ride began to be re-assembled and was re-opened to the public.

On 4 February 2019, the attraction was fully dismantled and removed from the park.

== Structure ==
Orbiter is mainly made up of 4 different parts. The first part is the yellow "arm" which supports the entire ride whether it is in operation or not. The second part is the centre red "wheel" which is attached to the "arm". The wheel supports the structure of the ride. The third part(s) is / are the number of white metal supports that support the 15 carriages where riders sit. The fourth and final part are the carriages themselves. This is where the riders sit when the ride is in operation.

== Ride experience ==
Riders take a seat in one of the 15 carriages which hold 2 riders each (for a total of 30 riders). There is no seat belt or restraint system on the ride, only a cage to hold on to during the ride as when the ride is in operation, gravity will keep the rider in place. Once the ride operators give the all clear, the ride begins to spin in a circle constantly picking up speed. It can take about 20 to 25 seconds for the ride to reach its top speed and lift off of the ground. After the ride lifts off the ground, the ride keeps rising eventually coming to an almost-vertical position. A few seconds later, the ride begins to descend back to the ground. The rides braking system is activated and the ride comes to a complete stop by the time it reaches the ground. One ride cycle is about 1 minute and 53 seconds. As of 4 February 2019, Orbiter will not reopen for the 2019 season, this was confirmed by the park.
