= Medieval Faire (Canada's Wonderland) =

Section of a theme park outside Toronto, Canada

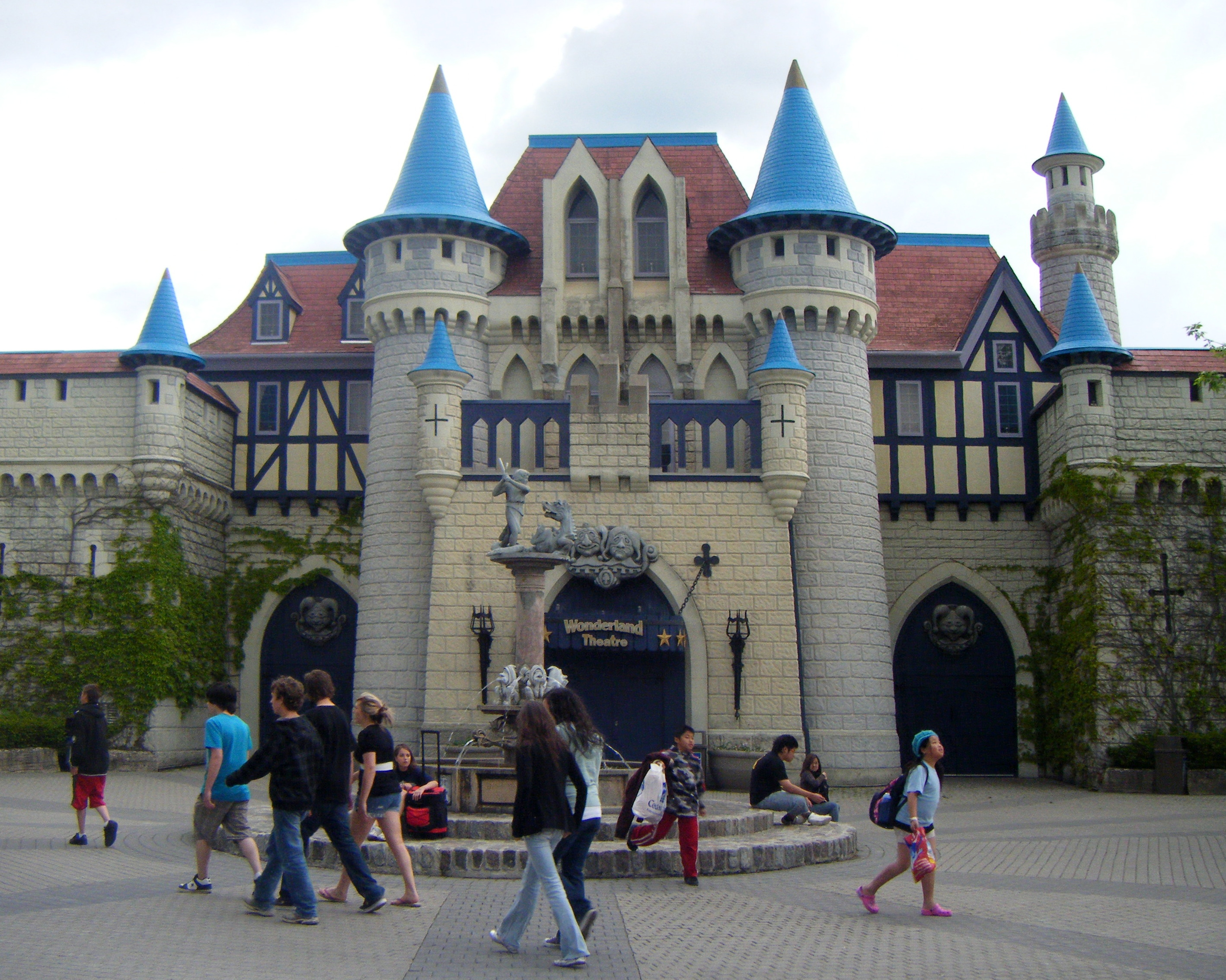
- Wonderland Theatre is designed to look as if it were a castle in the Middle Ages.
- Interactive map of Medieval Faire

Attractions
- Total: 12
- Roller coasters: 4
- Other rides: 6
- Shows: 2

Canada's Wonderland
- Coordinates: 43°50′39″N 79°32′29″W
- Opened: May 23, 1981

Originally themed around the Middle Ages, Medieval Faire is a section of Canada's Wonderland, a theme park in Vaughan, Ontario, Canada. As such, early attractions created under Kings Entertainment Company were named after knights, Don Quixote, Vikings, dragons, bats, and beasts. Throughout the Paramount Parks era, the section's new attractions lacked appropriate theming. The introduction of the Leviathan roller coaster to Medieval Faire in 2012 was the first major investment in the section since 2000; the park is now under ownership of Six Flags. The section includes four roller coasters (The Bat, Dragon Fyre, Leviathan, and Wilde Beast) and six other rides.

Over the years, atmosphere performers have disappeared from most sections of the park, including Medieval Faire. Two entertainment areas have remained constant in the section, a proscenium theatre and a stunt and acrobatic space surrounded by water. Currently named Canterbury Theatre, the indoor facility has hosted a variety of stage show revues, ice shows, and now an acrobatic production, Tundra: a Cirque Experience. A structure within Arthur's Baye initially featured a pirate diving and acrobatics show, which has changed now to have a more generic theme; it is currently branded as Fall Out Stunt Dive Show.

Food in the section was originally themed to the era, with a large indoor pub and rib stand. The food later took on a more traditional North American cuisine, like a buffet, burgers, chicken fingers, and subs. The names and facades of the two primary food locations found in the area however are medieval-themed (All's Well Hall & Kings Feast). Private events are held in the Courtyard facility and can also be held in All's Well Hall.

== Theming ==
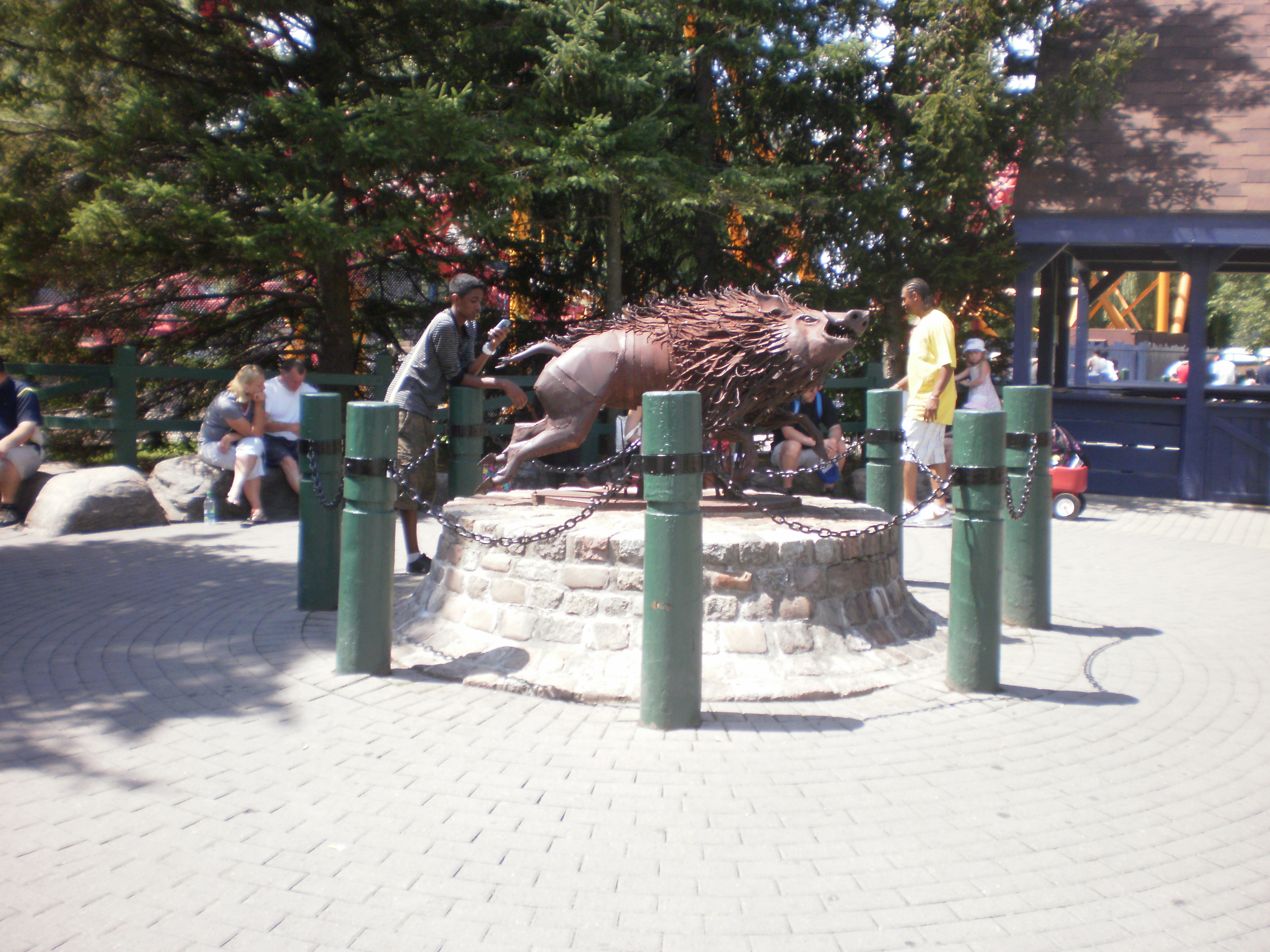
A sculpture at "Wilde Beast", by Bill Lishman.

A 1979 planning document describes the section: "A trip into the Middle Ages is in store for those visiting this area of Canada's Wonderland. Rides, restaurants, boutiques and the 1,200 seat air-conditioned Heritage Theatre where live shows are performed daily, await our guests in the Medieval Faire."

The section is entered through a fortresses' walls, over a castle moat. The front facade of Wonderland Theatre, previously Canterbury Theatre, was designed as a castle, and the other buildings were designed to fit the same time period.

Artist and inventor Bill Lishman created two sculptures for this section of the park, as well as some smaller works for application to the buildings. The most prominent is a dragon at the entrance to the Dragon Fyre, which had originally been intended to hold a sign, but the park management decided they liked it enough for it to be a standalone sculpture. Lishman was allowed to design it from scratch, as opposed to follow preset designs established before he was hired, taking him and assistant Richard Van Heuvelen two months to complete. The other main sculpture was the wild boar at Wilde Beast, both this and the dragon being built at his home in Blackstock, Ontario, for about $75,000. Signs by Lishman included Sherwood Florist, Boo Boo's Buggys, an ice cream cone, and for a popcorn counter.

Near to the First Aid building is the Medieval Faire washrooms. Initially themed in a medieval style, the thatched cottage was marked "Lords" and "Ladies". Publicist Mike Filey told the press that many were confused by the doors, or even where washrooms were, and this was to be fixed for the second park season. In the opening year, an information and ticket booth was located in front of Arthur's Baye; tickets have since been phased out.

For the 2019 season, Canada's Wonderland reverted some of the attractions names in Medieval Faire back to their original 1981 names. The names include:

- Canterbury Theatre, previously Wonderland Theatre
- Dragon Fyre, previously Dragon Fire
- Viking's Rage, previously The Rage
- Wilde Knightmares, previously Nightmares
- Wilde Beast, previously Wild Beast

In addition to the above changes, the restaurant Thrill Burger was renamed King's Feast for the 2019 season.

== Rides ==
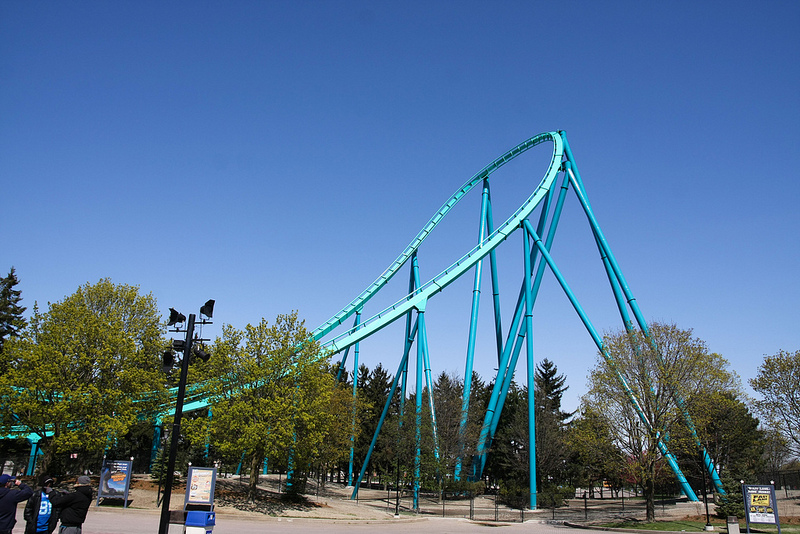
Leviathan

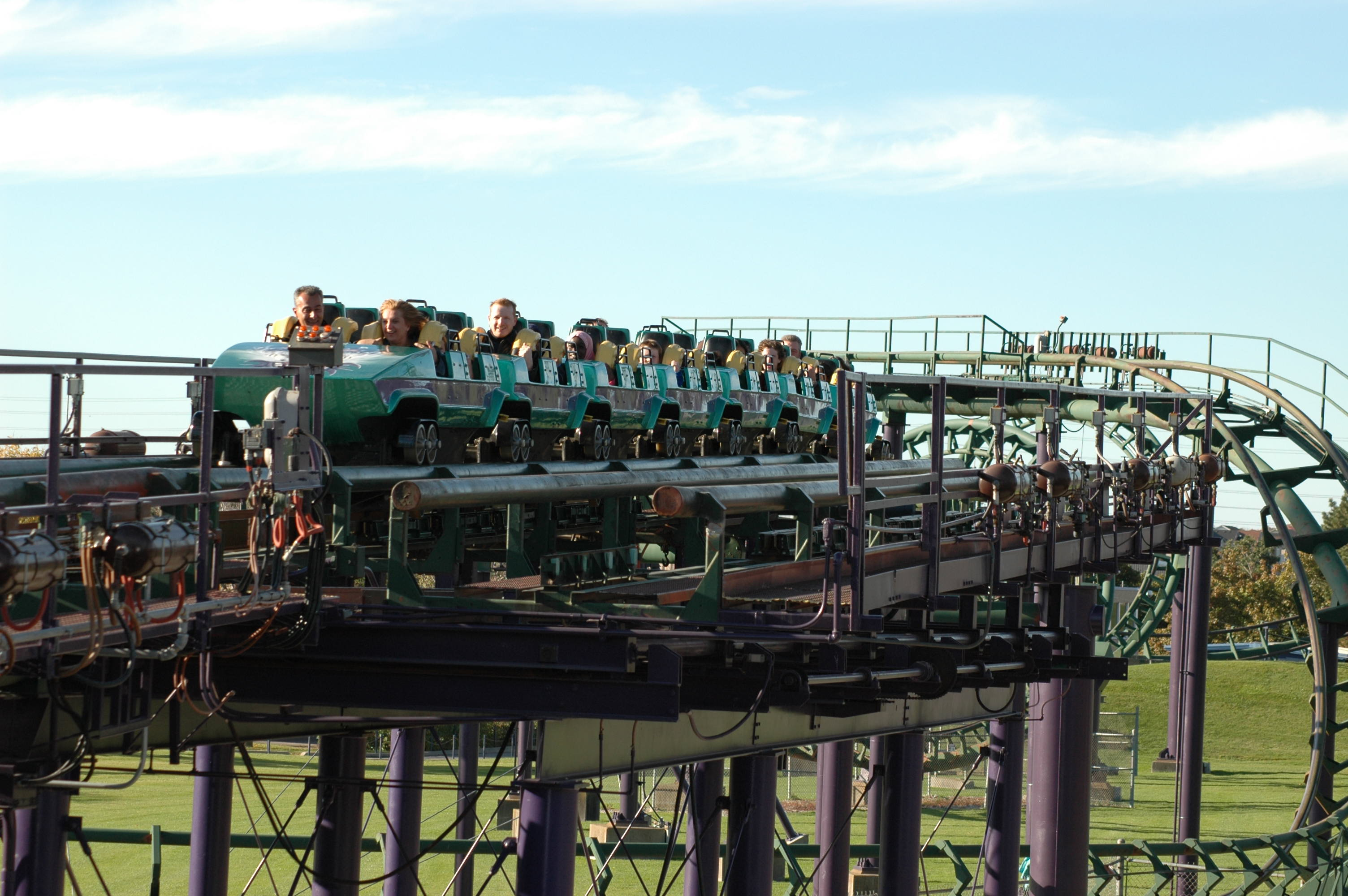
Dragon Fyre

Riptide in action.

This section of the park originally opened with five rides: Dragon Fyre, Wilde Beast, Viking’s Rage, Spinovator, and Wilde Knightmares. Dragon Fyre is the only Arrow Dynamics coaster in existence to have counter-clockwise turning corkscrews. Wilde Beast is a wooden roller coaster based on the former Wildcat from Cincinnati's Coney Island, while Wilde Knight Mares is a standing Enterprise ride featuring ten four-seater gondolas rises 60 feet, tilting 90 degrees. Viking's Rage, was the first of three pendulum rides the park operated; unlike the now removed Jet Scream, the boat ride does not go upside down. Spinovator features spinning kettles on a tilted platform. (Two years before opening, Dragon Fyre was simply called the Looping Corkscrew, and another ride was to be the Wildcat.)

In May 1981, Canada's Wonderland Director of Rides and Ground Services Jim Wilson told the Toronto Star that Wilde Beast (along with two of the other original coasters at the park, Scooby's Gasping Ghoster Coaster, and the Mighty Canadian Minebuster) was wooden thanks to the apparent popularity of different styles of rides. "Experiments" found that steel coasters weren't as popular or enjoyable to the public, "the sound and feel all contribute to the thrill of the ride. People just didn't like steel roller coasters."

Early promotion for Dragon Fyre highlighted all the safety measures, from an indirect reference to centrifugal force to x-raying welds. The most popular attraction in Medieval Faire, lines for Dragon Fire were about half-hour at their peak in 1982, considered at the time the longest of any attraction at the park.

Over the years, only four major attractions were added to Medieval Faire. Added in 1987, The Bat was a backwards looping roller coaster, including one loop and two lifts. The park addition included a shop named the Belfry. Later additions were Speed City Raceway (1997), Drop Zone (1997), and Cliffhanger (2000).

During the 1990s, almost all the rides were renamed: Dragon Fyre, Wilde Beast, Quixote's Kettles, Wilde Night Mares, and Viking's Rage became Dragon Fire, Wild Beast, Spinovator, Nightmares, and The Rage. When the park was sold to Cedar Fair, Paramount-specific ride names disappeared with Cliffhanger, Drop Zone becoming Riptide, Drop Tower, respectively.

In 2012, Leviathan joined the area, stripping the titles of tallest and fastest roller coaster in Canada from the park's own coaster, Behemoth. It was the first new ride in Medieval Faire in more than a decade. Leviathan is ranked as the seventh tallest, and the eighth fastest roller coaster in the world. It is Canada's Wonderland's 16th roller coaster. The addition came quickly after the launch of the 230-foot-tall Behemoth roller coaster in 2008, and the 301-foot-tall swing ride WindSeeker in the 2011 season.

| | Ride | Year opened | Previous name | Manufacturer | Description | Rating |
|---|---|---|---|---|---|---|
| The Bat | The Bat | 1987 | | Vekoma | A classic Vekoma Boomerang roller coaster. It was the seventh roller coaster added to the park. The Bat's train was originally one of three from Dragon Fyre, another of the park's roller coasters. This is because this coaster only ever used two of its trains, so the third was moved to The Bat. During the 2008 season The Bat's supports were painted orange. | 5 |
| Dragon Fire | Dragon Fyre | 1981 | Dragon Fire | Arrow Dynamics | A steel roller coaster. It is one of the four roller coasters that debuted with the park in 1981. Uniquely, unlike the other roller coasters produced by Arrow that contain corkscrews, Dragon Fyre's corkscrew runs counter-clockwise. While the ride came with 3 trains, only two are used for this ride, with the third being used for The Bat. | 5 |
| Drop Tower | Drop Tower | 1997 | Drop Zone | Intamin | A drop tower ride. All the former Paramount Parks have a ride similar to this with different heights. Formerly known as Drop Zone: Stunt Tower (1997–2007). | 4 |
| Leviathan signage. | Leviathan | 2012 | | Bolliger & Mabillard | A steel Giga Coaster. It is the park's sixteenth roller coaster. It is the tallest and fastest roller coaster in Canada and the seventh tallest and fastest coaster in the world. | 5 |
| | Wilde Knight Mares | 1981 | Night Mares | HUSS | Riders are lifted 49 feet (15 M) in the air while spinning from a horizontal to vertical position. | 4 |
| The Rage | Viking's Rage | 1981 | The Rage | HUSS | A HUSS swinging ship ride. | 3 |
| Riptide | Riptide | 2000 | Cliffhanger | Mondial | A Mondial Splashover Top Spin. | 5 |
| | Spinovator | 1981 | Quixote's Kettles | Heinrich Mack GMBH & Co | A teacup ride | 3 |
| | Wilde Beast | 1981 | Wild Beast | Philadelphia Toboggan Company | A wooden roller coaster. It is one of the four roller coasters that debuted with the park in 1981, and is one of two wooden coasters at Canada's Wonderland modeled after a ride at Coney Island amusement park in Cincinnati, Ohio (Wildcat) | 5 |

== Entertainment ==
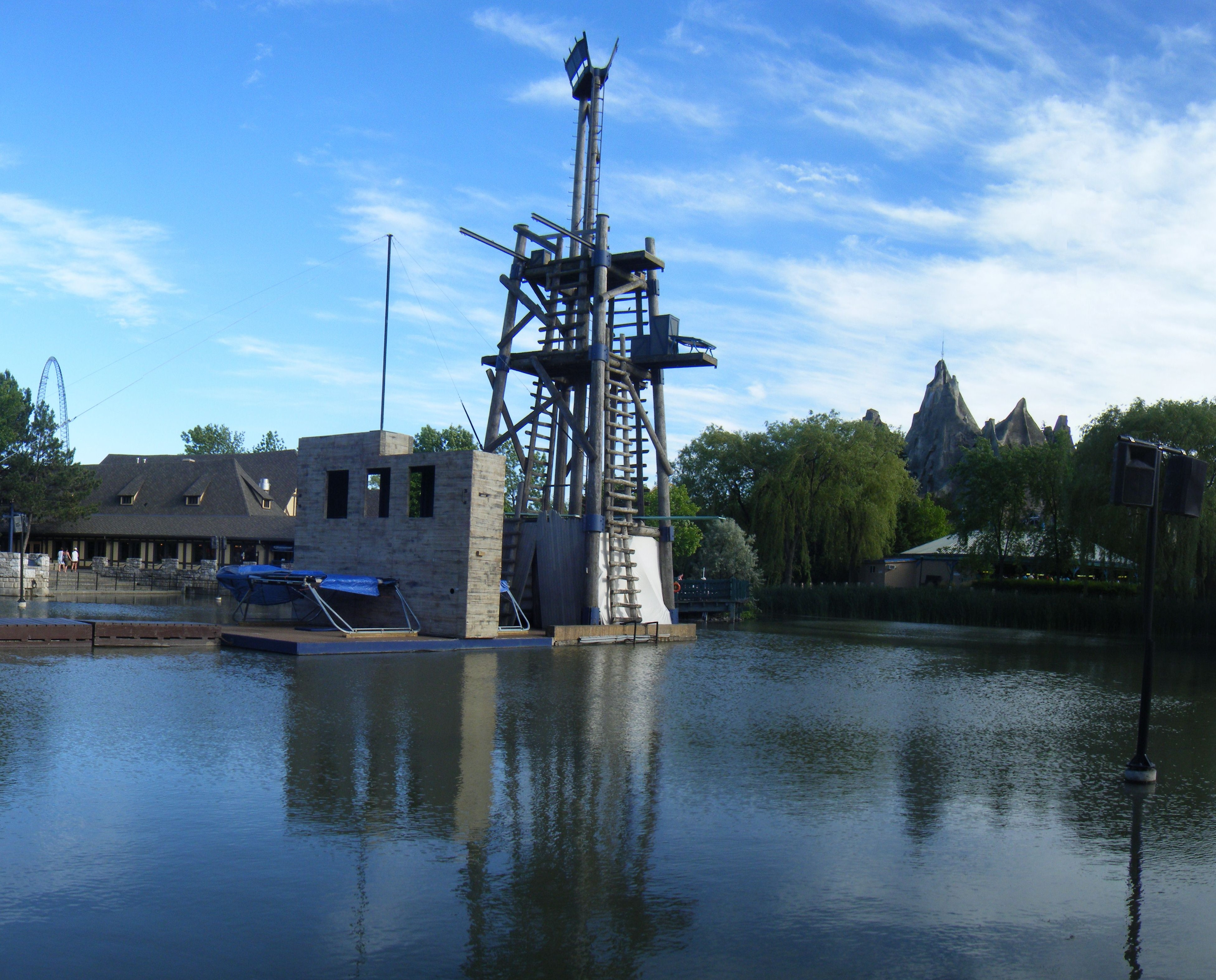
The structure in Arthur's Baye, for current dive and acrobatic shows.

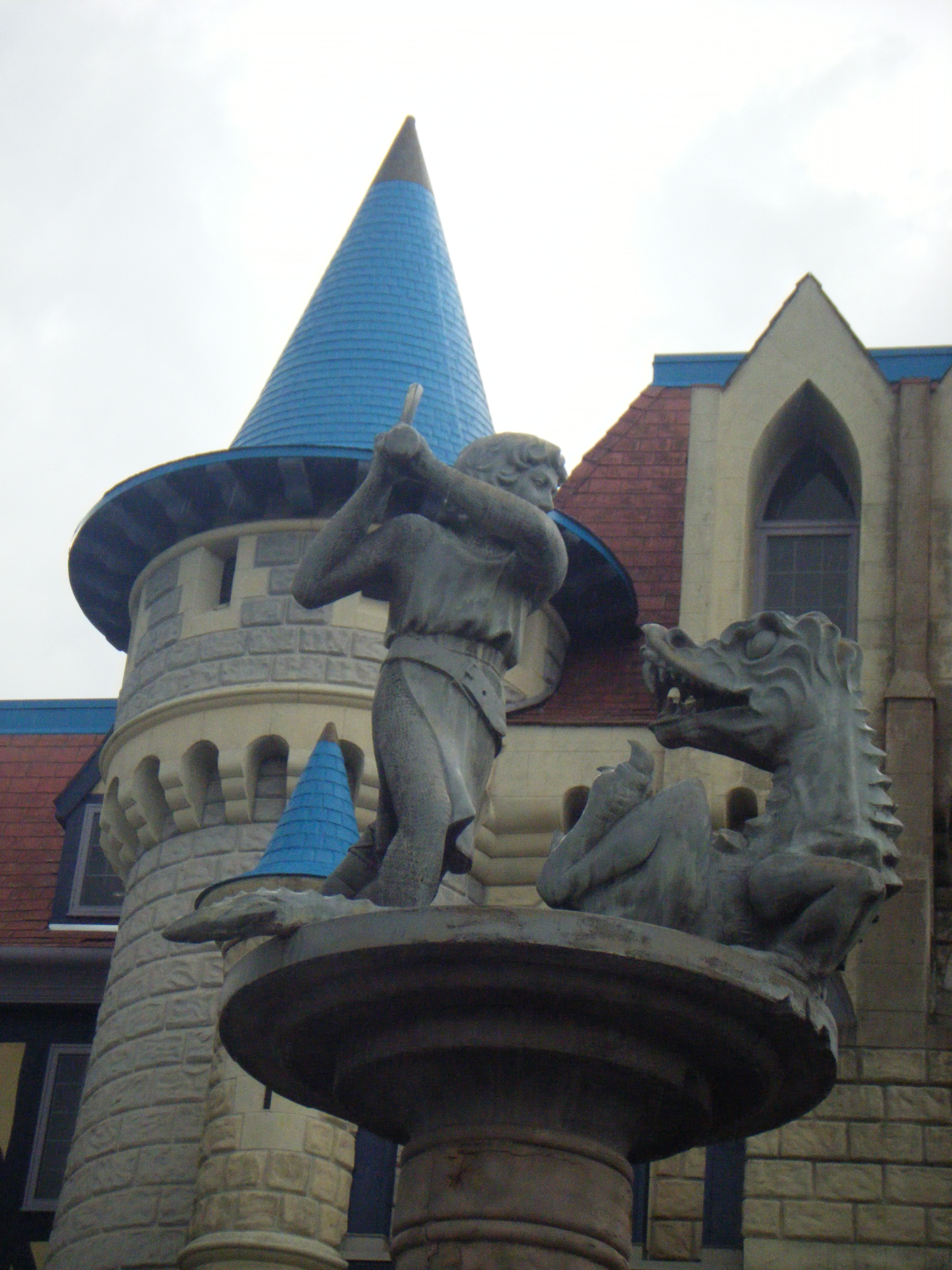
A themed fountain in front of the Wonderland Theatre.

There was initially a variety of street theatre present in the section: both a "town rustic" performing magic and "a wily wizard performing sleight of hand", a juggling jester, Robin Hood, and a singing Maid Marian who accompanied herself on the autoharp. Some outdoors performers existed in the section until at least 1987. While Peanuts characters appear on International Street and in Planet Snoopy, and Halloween programming includes walk-around characters, all regular season unlicensed atmosphere characters and entertainment have been removed from the park. Before the Celebration Canada celebrations in Frontier Canada, they had a limited amount of street performers such as a Mountie on stilts. They still have the performers in the Frontier Canada, but it had been moved from the Medieval Faire area.

=== Canterbury Theatre ===
Established as the Canterbury Theatre, this castle-fronted theatre spent a few years as the Paramount Theatre and Wonderland Theatre, and has gone from hosting Broadway-style productions to ice shows, during the regular season, and adult-targeted musicals during Halloween Haunt.

Early resources conflicted on the size of the theatre: most sources suggest 1100 seats, but a 1982 program suggested 1200. The theatre is formatted as proscenium, and was considered 'ultra-modern' upon opening.

In the first season, Canterbury hosted Those Magnificent Movies; "...a salute to Hollywood". The stage show lasted 45 minutes, with eight sets for eight segments, 20 singer-dancers, and a crew of 18. After an opening medley, a fantasy segment features "On the Good Ship Lollipop", "Yellow Submarine", "The Candy Man", and "Be a Clown". The next segment focused on the 1930s and 1940s, with "As Time Goes By", "Cheek to Cheek", and "I Got Rhythm". A western segment includes a tribute to Oklahoma!, while the sci-fi segment features "Star Wars (Main Theme)" (1977), John Williams' "Superman Theme" from the 1978 Superman film, a segment from the Academy Award- nominated score of Close Encounters of the Third Kind (1977), and "Cantina Band" from Star Wars. The modern segment included "The Rose", made famous by Bette Midler's 1979 film of the same name, and Academy Award-winning song "Fame", from the 1980 film of the same name. The finale included "All I Need Is The Girl" from stage musical Gypsy: A Musical Fable and "Get Happy", a 1930 song most associated with Judy Garland in Summer Stock (1950). In all, there were 200 costumes. Entry to the show was a D ticket, or $1.50, and shows were performed by high school students. On some days, 1950s musical revue Rock Around The Clock would perform there, as opposed to Labatt's International Showplace.

Later stage shows included Those Magnificent Movies, Fantasy, Superstars, Hot Ice, and School of Rock: Live in Concert. A cassette of recordings by the cast of Best of Broadway was released under the Taft Attractions label. At some point in the 1990s, a skating production was held at the theatre.

During Paramount ownership, the theatre was known as Paramount Theatre. Eventually, the Paramount Theatre stage was converted to an artificial ice surface, and renamed Wonderland Theatre. Two ice shows were presented, titled Endless Summer on Ice (2007–2009) and Snoopy Rocks! on Ice (2010–2011). The first production included Scooby-Doo and outfits like s'mores, while Snoopy, Charlie Brown, Lucy and Linus appeared in sequences of the latter. The show appeared at various other former Paramount Parks, and in each situation, the sequenced did vary between the Scooby-anchored and Peanuts-anchored productions.

Cirque Ambiente opened in Wonderland in 2012; located at Wonderland Theatre. The show is produced by Les Productions Haut-Vol, who also produces the Wonder Mountain dive show and the shows in Arthur's Baye. This isn't the first "cirque" act at the park. Quebec's Cirque du Tonnerre, featuring a contortionist from Cirque du Soleil, made an "exclusive Toronto appearance" at Wonderland in 1990. in 2019, Wonderland Theatre was renamed back to Canterbury Theatre, along with the other name changes to the area to better tie in with the medieval theme.

Of all the shows over the years, Wonderland estimates there have been 1300 performers. Jersey Boys choreographer Sergio Trujillo, television actor Matt Austin, and stage actress Erica Peck among them.

=== Arthur's Baye ===
A large pond in the Medieval Faire has always hosted free performances, the shows have remained largely similar over the years, alternating only in choreography from year–to–year, as opposed to premise. In planning documents, the water was originally called Medieval Lake.

Labatt's initially presented the Arthur's Baye show, "The Plight of the Land Locked Pirates". Described in the Guidebook, the "melodramatic stunt spectacular" was set on a "privateer ship" called the Sea Sceptre. Reports in 1980 suggested that the lake would have "ancient– looking sailing ships." The show would feature two sets of actors battling in a show of acrobatics and pyrotechnics. Billy, the 13-year-old hero of the show (played by a 20– year–old trampolinist), is kidnapped from the audience on shore and taken to the boat. Pirate Captain Evil Medieval and Billy's mother, played by a teenaged boy, were the two other primary characters. The trapeze and trampoline show ends with the mother lowering the pirate flag and raising a heart flag.

In 2009 the show was re–titled simply as the Arthur's Baye Dive Show, including trampoline and diving demonstrations, but no overarching plot. In 2011, they were nominated for an IAAPA Brass Ring Award 2011 in the Live Entertainment category for Best Overall Production $50,001-100,000. In 2012 it was re–branded completely as Kinet–X. The show was produced by Les Productions Haut-Vol from 2002 to 2010.

In conjunction with the park's Celebration Canada 150 event, the show was rethemed and renamed to "The Flying Frontenacs", giving it a more Canadian theme. The current version of the show has been in place since 2017.

== Food ==
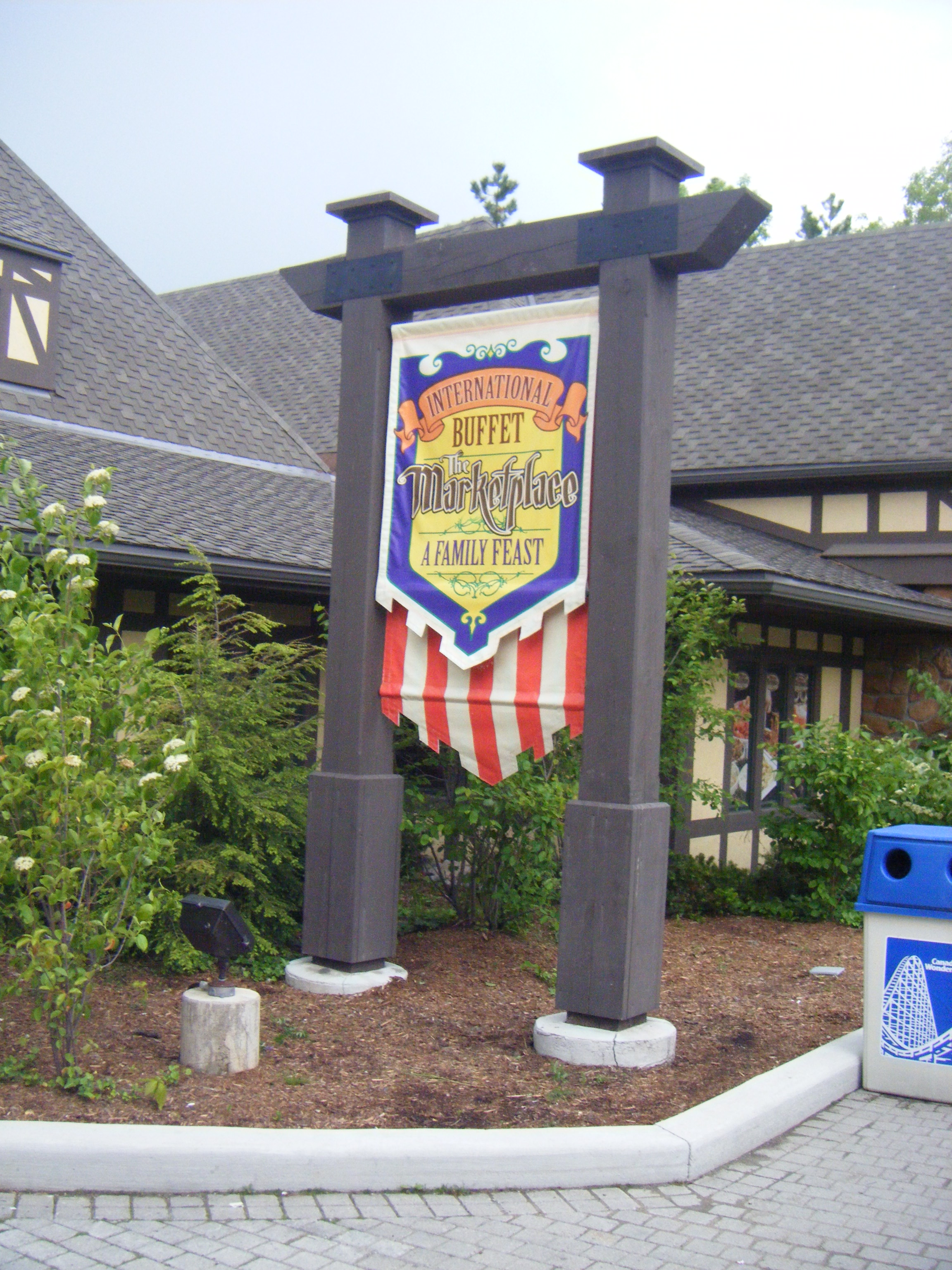
Marketplace, before it was returned to the All's Well Hall.

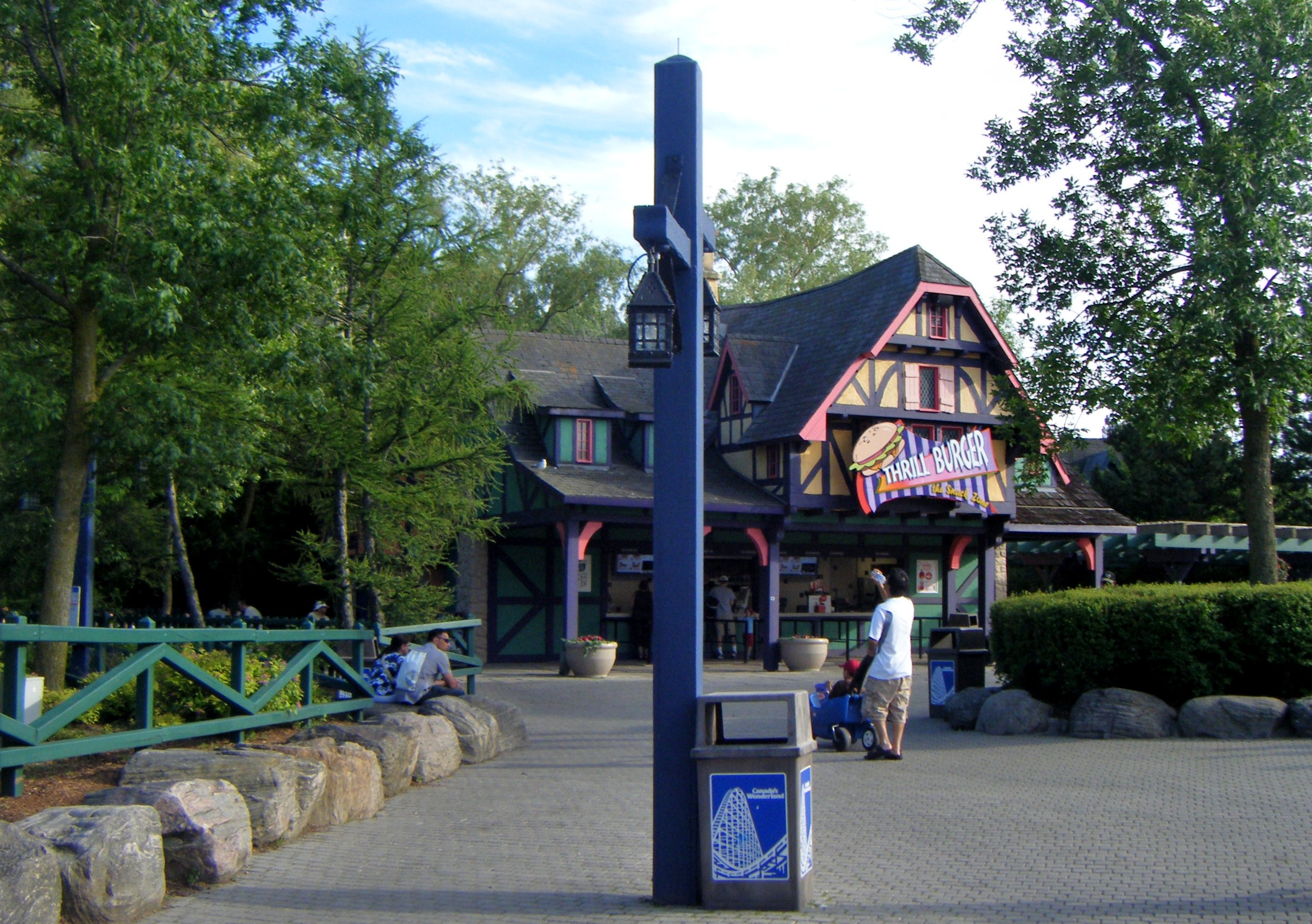
Thrill Burger, before 2012 renovations.

The largest facility in this area of the park is All's Well Hall (previously The Marketplace – International Buffet). In planning documents, it was simply called "Medieval Pub". In the park's opening season guidebook, the facility is listed as selling "bratwurst, sausages, beef and mushroom pie, smoked sausage, grilled frankfurter, sauerkraut, mashed potatoes, soft pretzels, pastries, with beer, wine, coffee, tea, milk, and soft drinks." The self–serve restaurant had table service on request, and seated 528; Ginza Gardens in Grande Exposition of 1890 was the only other restaurant in the park with table service. A review of the restaurant in The Toronto Star describes the facility as the park's flagship eatery, but it received mixed reviews. "The $2.50 beef and mushroom pie has a good crust and as much beef as potato. Tiny mushrooms, but big on flavor." Conversely, 50 cent pretzels "are strictly for teething tots –too chewy." All's Well Hall currently serves pub faire, including gourmet sliders, artisan flat bread pizza, fish and chips, nachos, wings, salads and other options. All's Well Hall has served a Mortal Meal, along with the Backlot Cafe elsewhere in the park, during Halloween Haunt in recent seasons.

While largely out of site from the bay for which it is named, Arthur's Baye Mill & Bakery shared a building with store called The Market Place. The store is now known as Jester's Courtyard (previously the Fun Shoppe), with the generically named Medieval Funnel Cakes. There is a Coca-Cola Freestyle location at the funnel cake store.

Other original outlets were:

- Yee Ribb Pytt: Barbecque ribs, smoked meat sandwich, and fries. Made by McCain, the fries were dubbed potato logs and Rubble spuds elsewhere in the park. Also listed in the guidebook were garden salad, coleslaw, melon, fruit drinks, soft drinks, and coffee.
- Arthur's Baye Mill & Bakery: Solely serving funnel cakes, at 90 cents. Teens taken to the park told the Star that "they look worse than they taste."
- Yorkshire Yogurt: "Freshly-made frozen yogurt with a touch of vanilla", available in a cone, or with fresh fruit in a cup.
- French Fryes and Shrymps: Battered and fried shrimp, a dozen served in a paper cone. "What a cruel fate for such healthy food," suggested a Star food writer.

The introduction of Leviathan to the section in 2012 lead to an expansion of Thrill Burger's front service counter and kitchen, to handle the expected increased volume of traffic to the section. Thrill Burger offers "our basic good quality burgers and fries", along with chicken fingers and onion rings. In 2019, Thrill Burger was renamed to King's Feast, along with several other attractions in Medieval Faire to better fit the area. The Mixitup Icee station was remade into the "Leviathan Icee Yard", featuring even larger drink containers than previously, emulating the size of the new ride. A truck positioned outside the Flight Deck roller coaster in Action Zone was rethemed and moved to Medieval Faire. This was moved back to be by Fight Deck and across Backlot Café and is now called a poutinerie, which serves classic poutine and specialty poutines. Other current food locations include a Dairy Queen and a Subway. Medieval Funnel Cakes shares a space with Jester's Courtyard.

Used for corporate catering and other large groups, Courtyard was originally known as King's Courtyard, until at least 1998. Public entry to the area is through a gate located between Wonderland Theatre and Riptide. Occasionally, other events are held at the Courtyard: in June 1998, the section hosted Alligators Alive!, an educational show about the Floridian animals.

== Other ==
The area features a variety of games, including an arcade, now known as Arcadium: Games of Skill. The park's First Aid and Security Building, now home only to the First Aid Centre, is located in the Medieval Faire section beside the games and Spinovator. Along with Hanna–Barbera Land, this section of the park was recreated at Australia's Wonderland.
