= Ghoster Coaster (Canada's Wonderland) =

Wooden roller coaster in Canada

- Previously known as Scooby's Gasping Ghoster Coaster
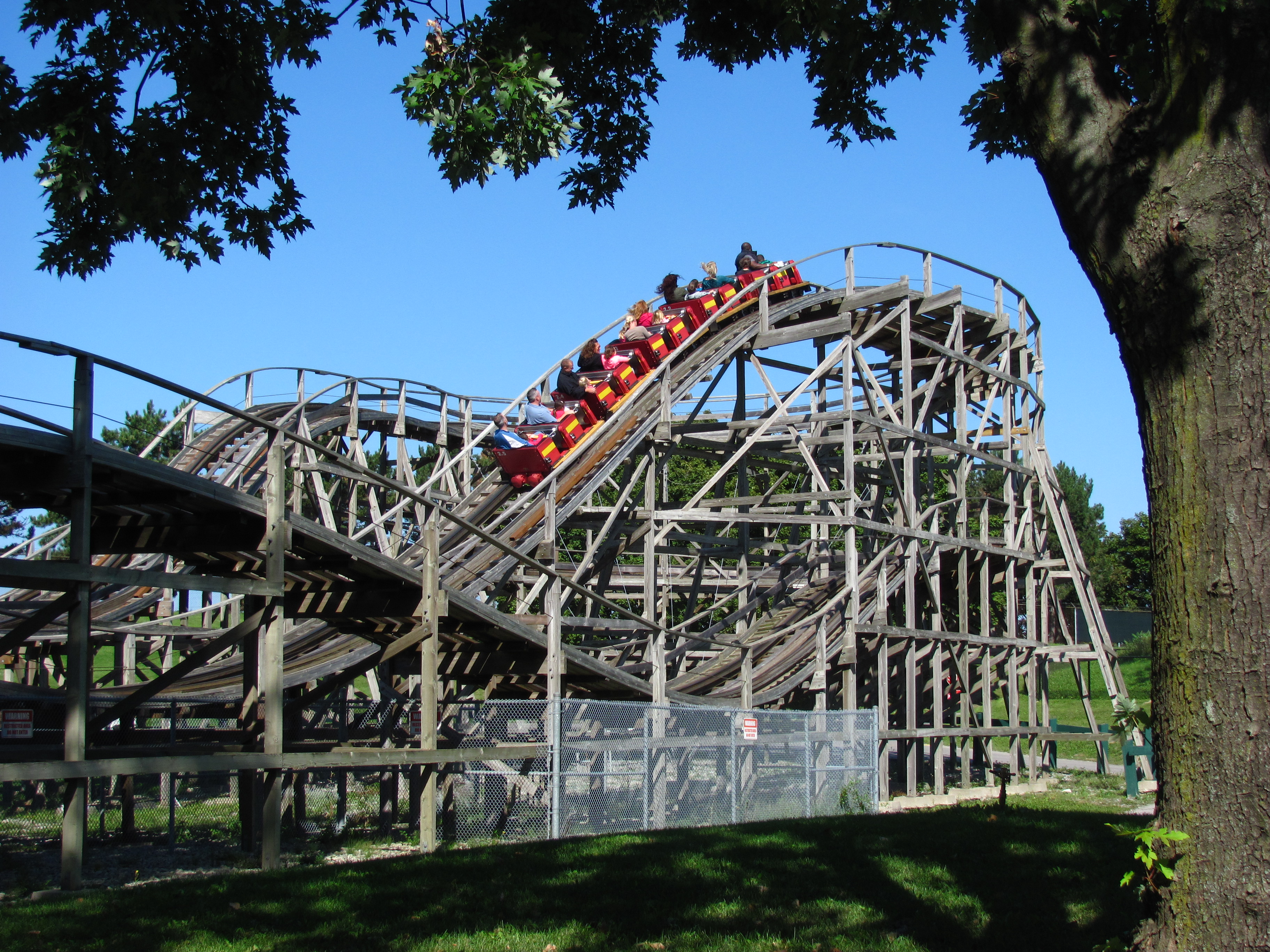

Canada's Wonderland
- Location: Canada's Wonderland
- Park section: Planet Snoopy
- Coordinates: 43.843794°N 79.546033°W
- Status: Operating
- Opening date: May 23, 1981

General statistics
- Type: Wood
- Manufacturer: Taft Broadcasting
- Designer: Curtis D. Summers
- Lift/launch system: Chain lift hill
- Height: 12.5 m (41 ft)
- Drop: 12 m (39 ft)
- Length: 413.3 m (1,356 ft)
- Speed: 56 km/h (35 mph)
- Duration: 1:20
- Height restriction: 102 cm (3 ft 4 in)
- Trains: 2 trains with 5 cars; riders arranged 2 across in 2 rows for a total of 20 riders per train
- Ghoster Coaster at RCDB

Ghoster Coaster (formerly Scooby’s Gasping Ghoster Coaster), is a junior wooden roller coaster located at Canada's Wonderland. Its name was shortened to for the 2010 season as part of the area's transition to Planet Snoopy.

Ghoster Coaster opened along with Canada's Wonderland on May 23, 1981, as one of its five original roller coasters. The other four were Dragon Fyre, Thunder Run, the Wilde Beast, and the Mighty Canadian Minebuster. All three wooden coasters were designed by Curtis D. Summers and built in-house by the Taft Broadcasting Company. Some sources claim Philadelphia Toboggan Company (PTC) built these coasters, but PTC stopped building coasters in 1979.

Ghoster Coaster was awarded ACE Coaster Classic status, but that status has since been rescinded as a result of recent changes to the coaster.
