= Splash Works =

Water park in Vaughan, Ontario, Canada

- Interactive map of Splash Works
- Location: Canada's Wonderland, Vaughan, Ontario, Canada
- Coordinates: 43°50′23″N 79°32′39″W
- Owner: Six Flags
- Opened: 1992
- Operating season: First Saturday after Victoria Day — Labour Day
- Area: 8.1 hectares (20 acres)
- Pools: 2 pools
- Water slides: 17 water slides
- Website: www.sixflags.com/canadaswonderland/splash-works

Splash Works is a 20-acre (8.1 ha) water park located within the park boundaries of Canada's Wonderland in Vaughan, Ontario, Canada. Entry is free with park admission. Splash Works is home to "Whitewater Bay", the largest outdoor wave pool in Canada, and has 16 waterslides. Splash Works operates during the summer months of May through September.

== History ==
=== First expansion: 1992 ===
The water park opened in 1992 with 4 hectares (10 acres) and it cost the company $6 million CAD. It opened with four combo water slides: Body Blast, Whirl Winds, Pipeline and Drop Zone (later renamed Wipeout). It also included a lazy river and a kids area, Scooby Splash Islands, with some kiddie slides and a wading pool. Of these slide towers, Whirlwinds is the only waterslide from Splash Works' opening year to still be operational.

=== Second expansion: 1996 ===
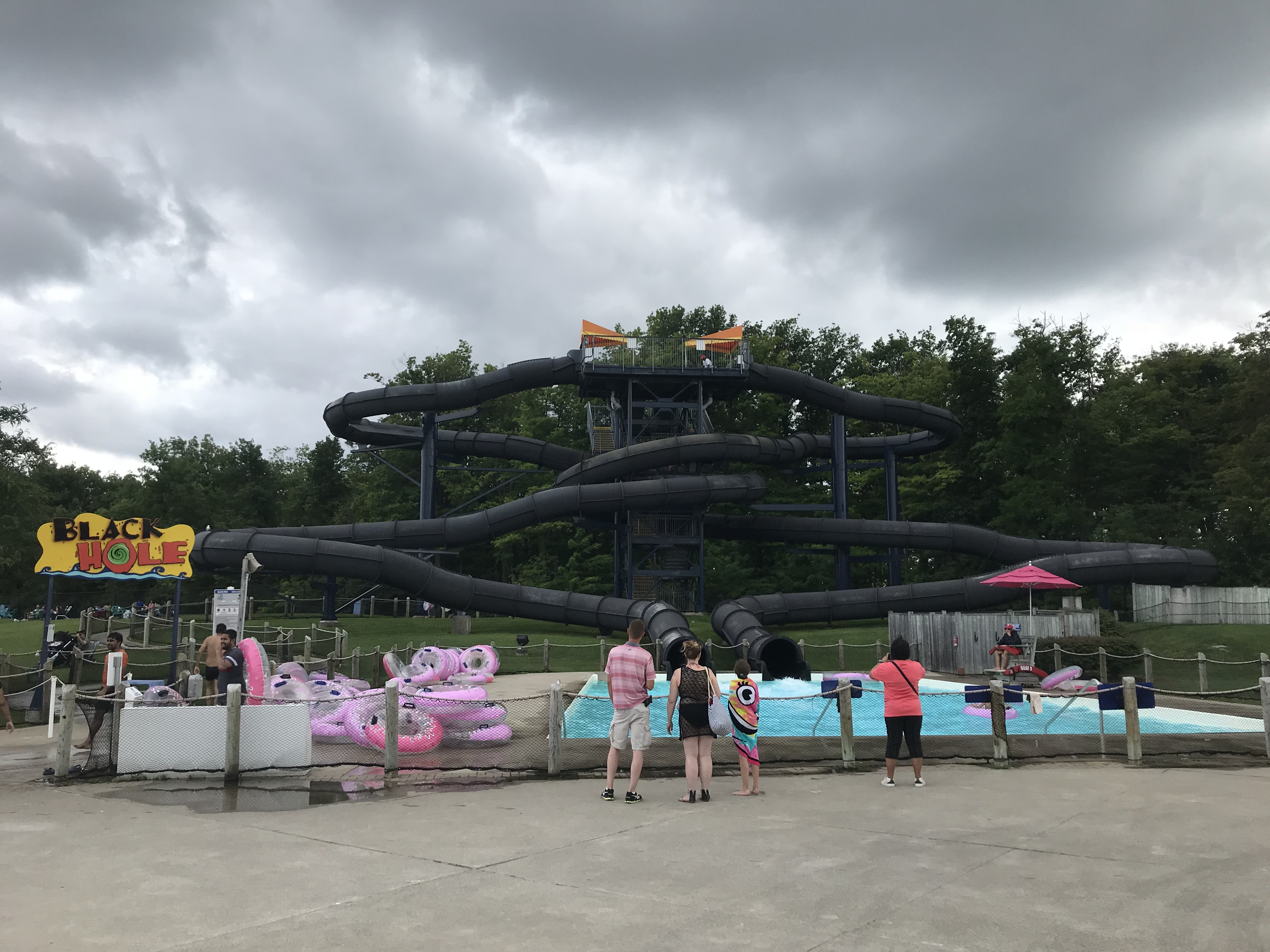
The Black Hole, a water slide at Splash Works, was opened in 1996.

The year 1996 was the single largest expansion of the water park since its opening in 1992. It saw Splash Works expand to 8.1 hectares (20 acres) through an expansion south of the Mighty Canadian Minebuster, so much so, some of the track had to be reconfigured so a bridge could be built over it. It essentially created a south side to the water park. The 1996 expansion saw the creation of White Water Bay, which is still the largest outdoor wavepool in Canada, along with the Black Hole enclosed tube slide complex and Pump House, an interactive spray ground.

=== Third expansion: 1999 ===
The year 1999 was the third expansion of Splash Works. It saw the creation of two new slides, Super Soaker and The Plunge. While two separate rides, they share a common loading platform tower. The 1999 expansion also saw another bridge to the south side of Splash Works (behind these two slides). In addition, these two new slides and new bridge cross over Minebuster. The Plunge is a multi-person raft straight down a slide, and the Super Soaker is twisting water slide. They both use the same tube and share the same tower.

=== Fourth expansion: 2002 ===
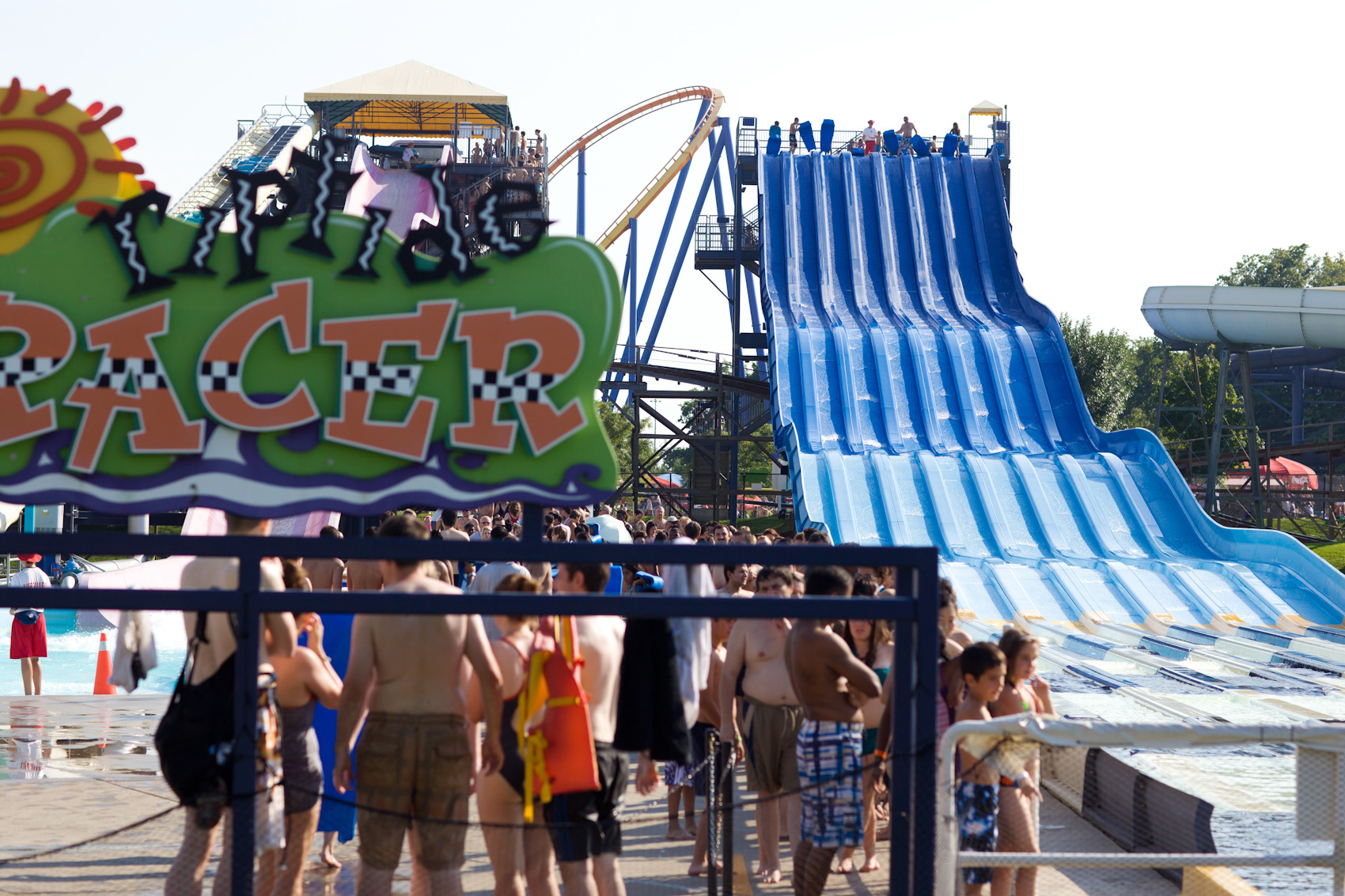
Riptide Racer was a water slide that opened at Splash Works in 2002.

The year 2002 expansion of Splash Works saw the addition of Riptide Racer and Barracuda Blaster. Barracuda Blaster is bowl slide, and Riptide Racer is an eight lane mat-racer slide. Barracuda Blaster took a part of the Lazy River for exiting out of the bowl and Riptide Racer also created a new waterfall for the Lazy River. Two new kiddie slides were added to Splash Island as well as an interactive water playground.

=== Fifth expansion: 2015 ===
The latest expansion of Splash Works was made in 2015. Canada's Wonderland announced two new additions in 2014, Typhoon and Splash Station. Typhoon, originally known as Topsy Turvy, was relocated from Ontario Place where it never opened. It features funnels and hairpin turns. The two attractions are built in the former area of Wipeout, near Muskoka Plunge.

=== 2017 and Onwards ===
In 2016, Canada's Wonderland announced the addition of Muskoka Plunge, a quadruple drop pod slide that would replace the aging Body Blast. Around January 2017, it was discovered that Muskoka Plunge would be manufactured by SplashTacular, an American company that supplied larger versions to Six Flags New England and Six Flags America in 2014, and like them, Muskoka Plunge would feature several different ways to launch riders. These included simultaneously, one at a time, or roulette.

On National Rollercoaster Day 2017, alongside the announcements for Lumberjack and Flying Canoes, the rebranding and renovation of Splash Island to Lakeside Lagoon was announced.

On 14 August, 2019, the park announced Mountain Bay Cliffs, a cliff jumping-style attraction featuring platforms of various heights, the highest of which being 7.5 metres (25 ft). Splash Works, alongside the rest of the main park remained closed throughout the 2020 season due to the COVID-19 pandemic. It opened in 2021.

On 10 August, 2023, the park announced Splash Works would receive Moosehorn Falls for the 2024 season. The slide, manufactured by WhiteWater West features six-person rafts travelling down a course of small drops and turns before plummeting down a large drop into a 13-metre (42 feet) wall, leading in to the final splash pool. The name "Moosehorn Falls" is inspired by waterfalls on the Moosehorn Trail of the Fundy National Park in New Brunswick.

== Slides and attractions ==
Splash Works has removed three attractions since opening; Pipeline in 2001, Wipeout in 2004, and Body Blast in 2017.

Ride	Year opened	Manufacturer	Description	Rating
Barracuda Blaster	2002	ProSlide Technology	A bowl ride slide that leads into the Lazy River.	5
Black Hole	1996	ProSlide Technology	Two four-story enclosed water slides	5
Lakeside Lagoon	2018	N/A (Slides from ProSlide Technology)	An interactive family area, featuring various water features, seating areas, and two small children's slides. A renovation of the Splash Island area & children's slides.	1
Lazy River	1992	Water Technology	A quarter-mile lazy river.	2
Moosehorn Falls	2024	WhiteWater West	A Boomerango-style waterslide featuring six-person rafts, small drops and turns before plummeting down a large drop towards a 13-metre (42 ft) wall.	5
Mountain Bay Cliffs	2021		A cliff jumping-style attraction, featuring platforms of various heights, the highest of which being 7.5 metres (25 ft). Construction was completed in 2020 but the opening was delayed due to the COVID-19 pandemic.	5
Muskoka Plunge	2017	SplashTacular	4 water slides with a launch chamber featuring a floor that drops out from under the rider.	5
Pumphouse	1999	Specialized Component Supply Co.	A children's play area	1
Riptide Racer	2002	ProSlide Technology	Multi-lane racer water slide	4
Splash Station	2015		A children's interactive play area that features two twisting water slides, jet sprays, a large tipping bucket, and water guns. It formerly operated at Ontario Place.	1
Super Soaker	1999	ProSlide Technology	Family raft water slide	5
The Plunge	1999	ProSlide Technology	The Plunge takes rafters over 15 metres (50 ft) of free-fall plunges. In a three-seater raft, riders will sail down a triple drop straight slide, reaching howling, gravity-pulling speeds.	5
Typhoon	2015	Proslide Technology	Two partially enclosed tube slides with funnels located where Wipe Out was once located. They came from Ontario Place where they were known as Topsy Turvy.	4
Waterways		ProSlide Technology	An interactive tube slide for kids and grown-ups	2
Whirl Winds	1992	ProSlide Technology	Two open-air water slides	3
White Water Bay	1996	Aquatic Amusements Associates Ltd.	A wave pool. The largest wave pool in Canada.	3

=== Lakeside Lagoon ===
Lakeside Lagoon is a sub-area within Splash Works designed for the very youngest of children. The area opened in 1992 (alongside the rest of Splash Works) as Splash Island and opened with four slides, and it was expanded in 2002. In 2018, the name of Splash Island was changed to what it is known as today. In addition, Lakeside Lagoon doubled in size and introduced new interactive water features and children's slides alongside various aesthetic changes during this revamp, giving the area a more Canadian theme.

Lakeside Lagoon includes:

- Lakeside Lagoon Pool
- Waterways
- Lakeside Lagoon Kiddie Slides
- Spray Ground

== See also ==
- List of Cedar Fair water parks
