= Leviathan (Canada's Wonderland) =

Roller coaster

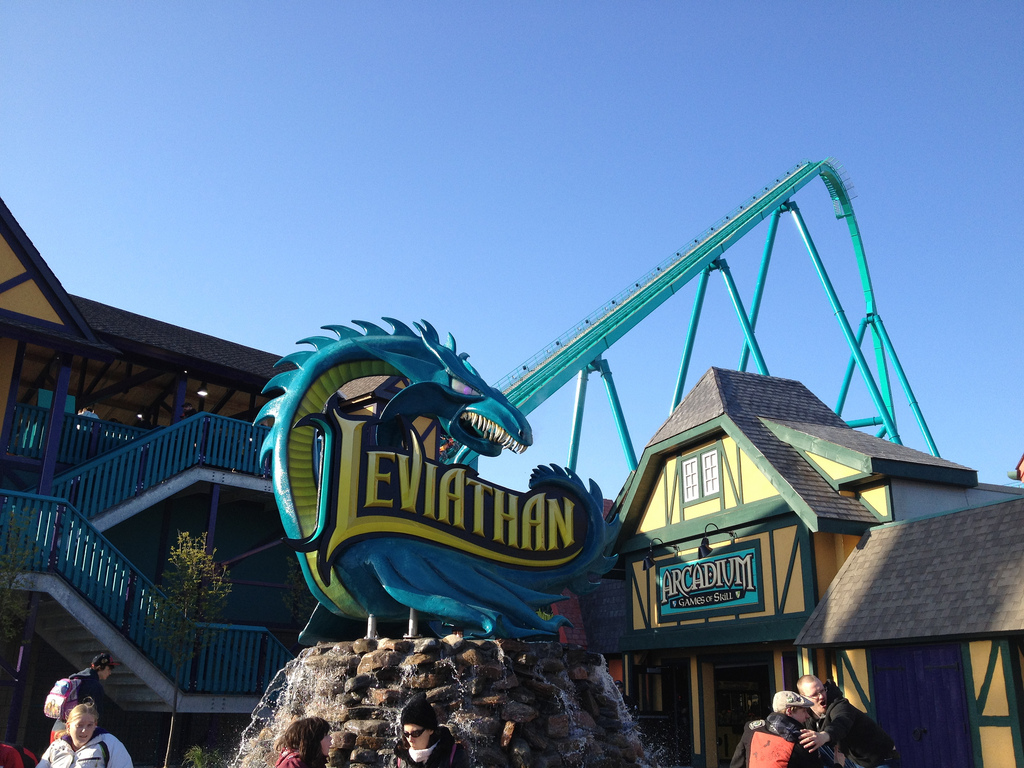
- A picture of Leviathan's sculpture, plaza, station, and lift hill.

Canada's Wonderland
- Location: Canada's Wonderland
- Park section: Medieval Faire
- Coordinates: 43°50′40.22″N 79°32′32.76″W
- Status: Operating
- Soft opening date: 27 April 2012
- Opening date: 6 May 2012

General statistics
- Manufacturer: Bolliger & Mabillard
- Designer: Werner Stengel
- Model: Hyper Coaster (Note: B&M's official website later categorized 300-foot installations, including Leviathan and Fury 325, under a dedicated "Giga Coaster" section, but they were developed as part of the Hyper Coaster model line.)
- Track layout: Out and Back
- Lift/launch system: Chain lift hill
- Height: 93.3 m (306 ft)
- Drop: 93.3 m (306 ft)
- Length: 1,672 m (5,486 ft)
- Speed: 148 km/h (92 mph)
- Inversions: 0
- Duration: 3:28
- Max vertical angle: 80°
- Capacity: 1650 riders per hour
- G-force: 4.5
- Height restriction: 137–203 cm (4 ft 6 in – 6 ft 8 in)
- Restraints: Lap bar and seat belt
- Fast Lane Plus only available
- Must transfer from wheelchair
- Leviathan at RCDB

Leviathan (/lɪˈvaɪ.əθən/ liv-EYE-ə-thən) is a steel roller coaster located at Canada's Wonderland in Vaughan, Ontario, Canada. Located in the Medieval Faire section of the park, the Hyper Coaster model from Swiss manufacturer Bolliger & Mabillard is the first roller coaster manufactured by the company to exceed a height of 91.5 metres (300 feet), putting it in a class of roller coasters commonly referred to as giga. At 1,672 metres (5,486 feet) long, 93.3 metres (306 feet) tall, and with a top speed of 148 kilometres per hour (92 miles per hour), Leviathan is the tallest and fastest roller coaster in Canada, taking the records previously held by Behemoth on the opposite side of the park. As of July 2020, Leviathan is ranked as the eighth tallest roller coaster in the world, the sixth tallest coaster by drop height, and the fourth-tallest traditional lift-style coaster in the world.

Leviathan was the 16th roller coaster to be built at Canada's Wonderland. The ride was announced in August 2011, its track was completed in February 2012, and the first test run was completed on 15 March 2012. The coaster opened to season pass holders on 27 April 2012, and to the general public on 6 May 2012.

== History ==
In the early planning stages of Leviathan, had Bolliger & Mabillard declined to make a roller coaster over 91.5 metres (300 ft), the park would have gotten another manufacturer to design the roller coaster. Walter Bolliger admitted that he "owed" the park, as an inverted roller coaster could not be built several years earlier because of an exclusivity clause with Cedar Point.

Speculation about a new roller coaster at Canada's Wonderland began in early 2011, when construction work started around the Dragon Fyre ride and the Go Karts. On 3 July 2011, Canada's Wonderland launched a teaser website featuring a countdown clock to 18 August 2011, 7:00 am, accessible through the park's Facebook page. The website also featured quotations from online theme park reporters and Cedar Fair's CEO.

=== Announcement and construction ===
Canada's Wonderland announced Leviathan at 7:00 am on 18 August 2011, and the ride was also announced live on Breakfast Television Toronto. Erection of the track began during the week of 11 September 2011; the brake-run and station portions of track were completed by the end of September.

On 18 October 2011, the coaster's longest and heaviest lift hill track piece, standing at 36.6 metres (120 ft) long, was installed. By mid–November the lift hill and drop were finished and the overbank turn was nearing completion. Construction continued through December and January, and the track was completed on 7 February 2012. The first test run was completed on 15 March 2012, and on 18 April 2012, Canada's Wonderland announced on its Facebook account that a 30.5-metre (100 ft) tunnel would be placed at the bottom of the ride's first drop.

=== First rider auction ===
On 19 January 2012, Canada's Wonderland launched an auction in which bidders around the world competed to be one of the first ninety-six public riders on Leviathan on 27 April 2012, a week before the park officially opened the ride. The auction raised over C$40,000, which was donated to the Hospital for Sick Children. The highest bid in the auction for a single seat was $1,000. When bidders got to ride the roller coaster, the tunnel at the bottom of the first drop was not yet installed.

== Ride experience ==
It's fast, it's smooth and it's got an incredible thrill.

— Dineen Beaven, manager of Public Relations and Events at Canada's Wonderland

As of 2024, Leviathan is Bolliger & Mabillard's second tallest and fastest roller coaster, and the company's first giga coaster – a class of roller coasters with a height or drop that exceeds 91.5 metres (300 ft). One cycle of the ride lasts about 3 minutes and 28 seconds.

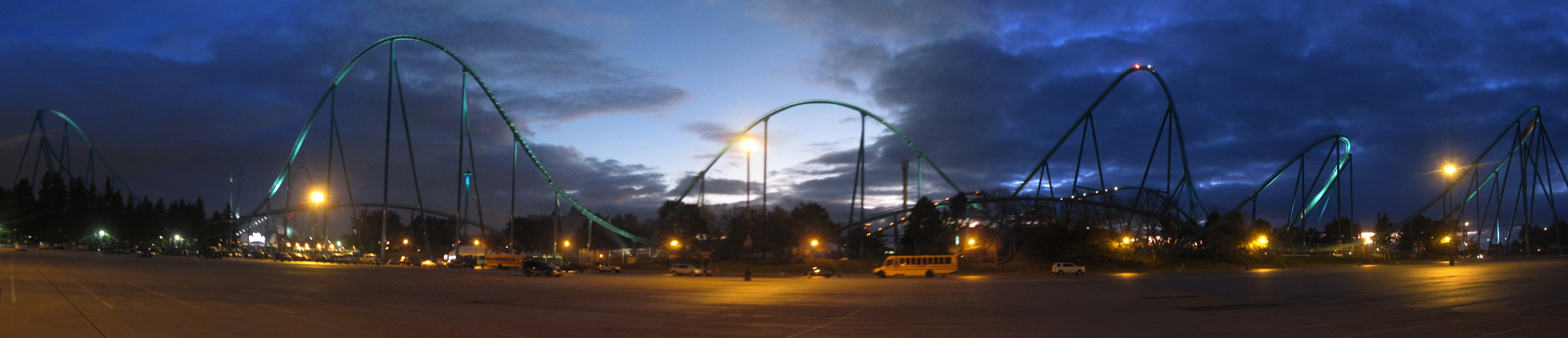
Leviathan at dusk as seen from the parking lot.

=== Layout ===
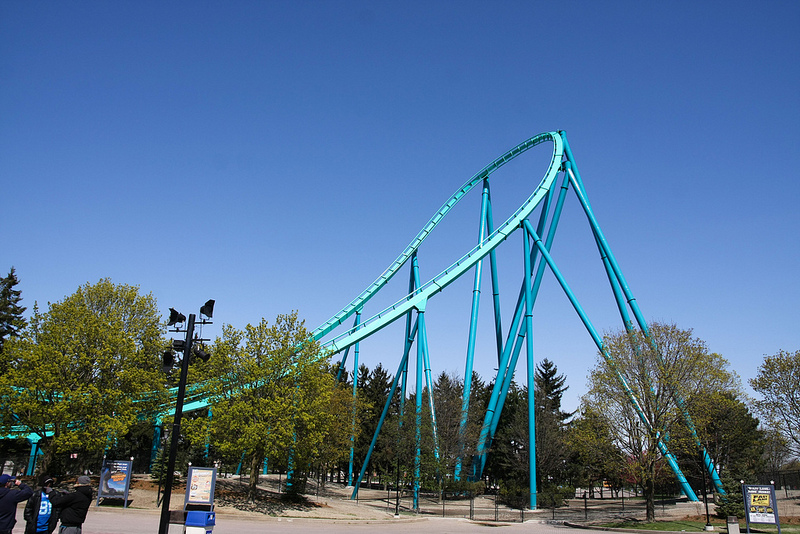
The hammerhead turn on the Leviathan.

After leaving the station, the train turns 180 degrees to the right, then begins to climb the chain lift hill, travelling at a speed of 15.5 kilometres per hour (9.6 mph). Once at the top of the 93.3-metre (306 ft) lift, it drops to the ground at an 80-degree angle, reaching a top speed of 148 kilometres per hour (92 mph). Following the first drop, the train goes through a 30-metre (100 ft) tunnel next to the Wonderland Terminal, then curves upwards into a 50-metre-tall (164.0 ft) overbanked banked turn to the right. This is followed by another drop that enters a speed hill, which makes a high-speed turn slightly to the left at approximately 122 kilometres per hour (76 mph). The exit of the first high speed turn leads directly into a 56-metre-tall (184 ft) camelback, followed by a 44.8-metre-tall (147 ft), 115-degree hammerhead turn. Both of these elements are located above the guest parking lot and in front of the park's main entrance. After leaving the hammerhead turn, the train enters a second high-speed curve at approximately 96.5 kilometres per hour (60.0 mph). The train then traverses a smaller, 37.8-metre-tall (124 ft) camelback, leading to a third high-speed turn which bends to the left and leads into the brake run and into the station.

=== Trains ===
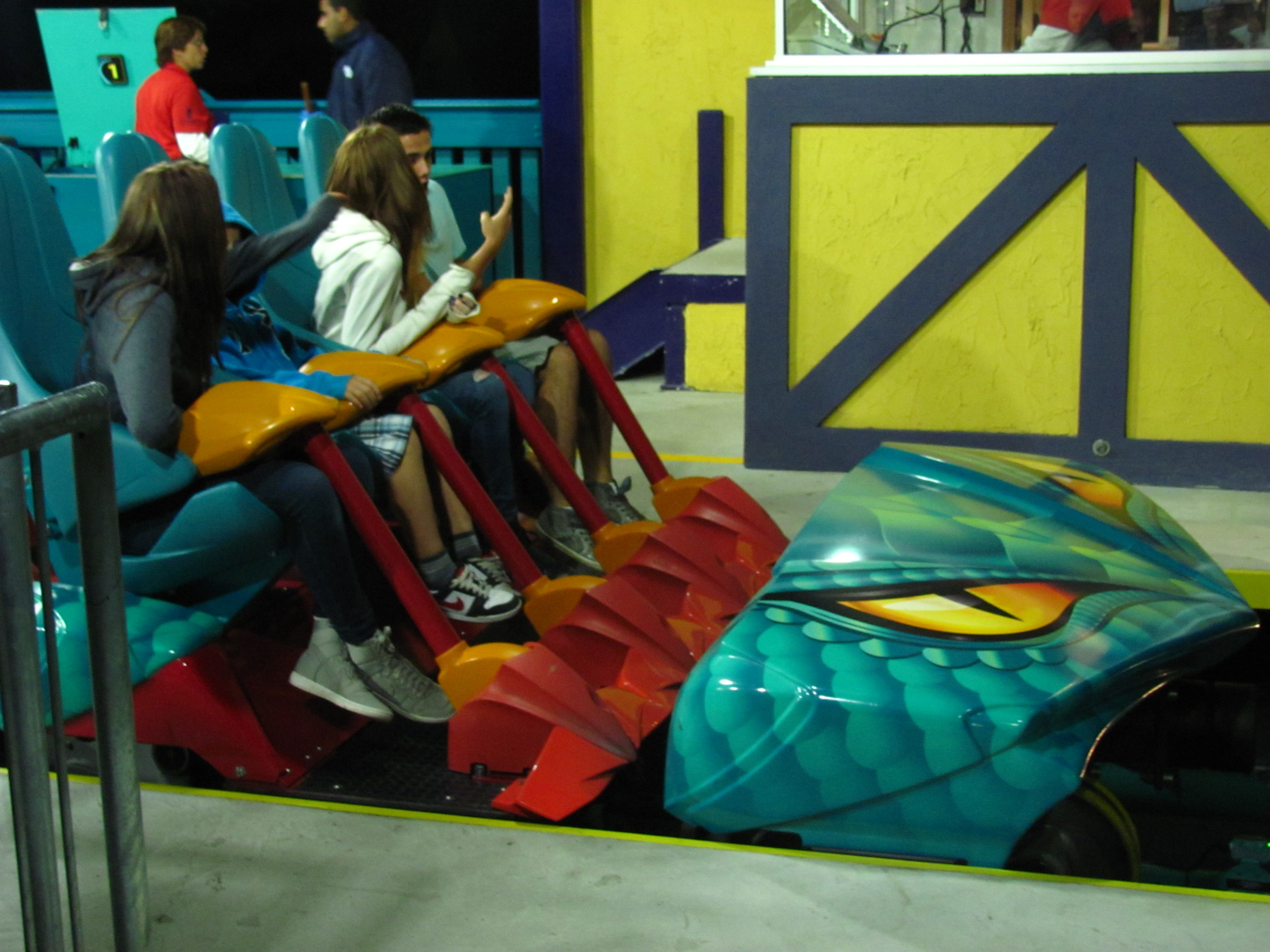
The front of Leviathan's open-air train, with orange and red lapbars used to restrain the rider.

Leviathan operates with three open-air steel and fibreglass trains coloured red, orange and yellow, respectively. The face of Leviathan, a theme element, covers the front of the trains. Each train has eight cars with four seats per car, which are styled after Bolliger & Mabillard's traditional hyper coaster cars, as opposed to the staggered seating used on Behemoth. Each train seats 32 riders, who are restrained using lapbars and seatbelts. Leviathan's lapbars feature a clamshell design which are also present on all other Bolliger and Mabillard Hyper Coaster models. The clamshell restraints are padded with comfortable materials and are designed to fit a wide range of body sizes and shapes, ensuring that riders of varying proportions can be accommodated comfortably.

=== Track ===
The steel track of Leviathan is over a mile long at 1,672 metres (5,486 ft), the height of the lift hill is 93.3 metres (306 ft) and the angle of the first descent is approximately 80 degrees. The colour of the track is cyan (Hex #2fd9cf) and its supports are blue (Hex #0295b3). Leviathan uses a single chain for the lift hill.

=== Station and plaza ===
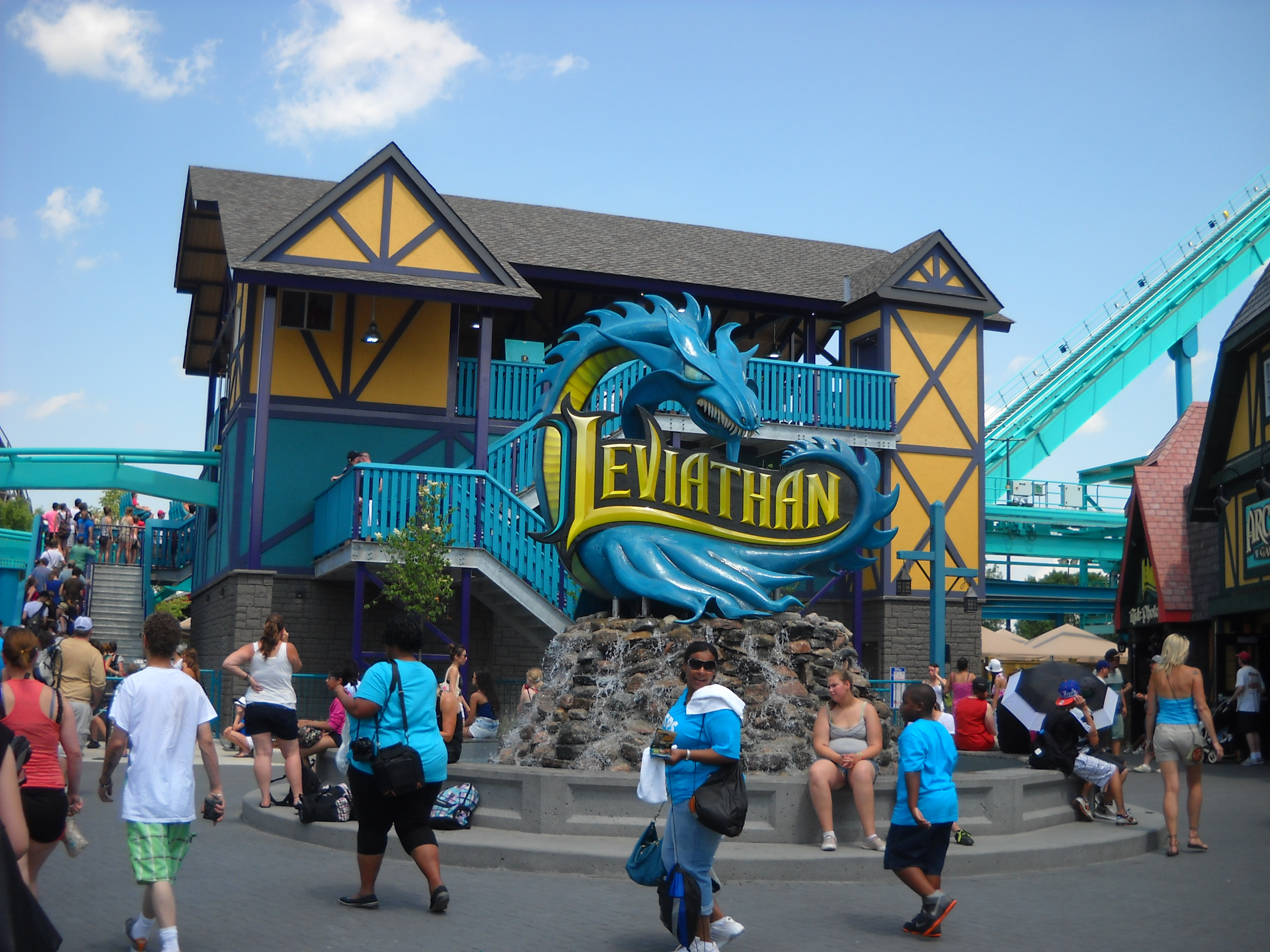
The ride's station and plaza is located in the Medieval Faire section of Canada's Wonderland.

Leviathan's station has an elevator near the exit, wooden guard rails with slanted railings and two queues, one of which is the Fast Lane queue for pass holders. In front of the station, there is a rock fountain with a sculpture of a Leviathan on top. To the right of the sculpture, there is an arcade building that was renovated during the construction of the roller coaster. Unlike most of the park's attractions, Leviathan has its own gift shop. Leviathan's gift shop offers riders the option to purchase their FunPix photos.

== Awards ==
Leviathan was ranked in the Amusement Today's Golden Ticket Awards for best new ride of 2012 with 14% of the vote, to come in third place.

Golden Ticket Awards: Best New Ride for 2012
| Ranking | 3 |

Golden Ticket Awards: Top steel Roller Coasters
| Year | | | | | | | | | 1998 | 1999 |
|---|---|---|---|---|---|---|---|---|---|---|
| Ranking | | | | | | | | | – | – |
| Year | 2000 | 2001 | 2002 | 2003 | 2004 | 2005 | 2006 | 2007 | 2008 | 2009 |
| Ranking | – | – | – | – | – | – | – | – | – | – |
| Year | 2010 | 2011 | 2012 | 2013 | 2014 | 2015 | 2016 | 2017 | 2018 | 2019 |
| Ranking | – | – | 22 | 15 | 6 | 8 | 7 | 6 | 8 | 9 |
| Year | 2020 | 2021 | 2022 | 2023 | 2024 | 2025 | 2026 | | | |
| Ranking | N/A | 8 | 15 | 13 | 13 | 15 | 21 | | | |

== See also ==
- List of rides at Canada's Wonderland
- 2012 in amusement parks
