= Dragon Fyre =

Steel Roller coaster At Canada's Wonderland

- Previously known as Dragon Fire (1997-2018)
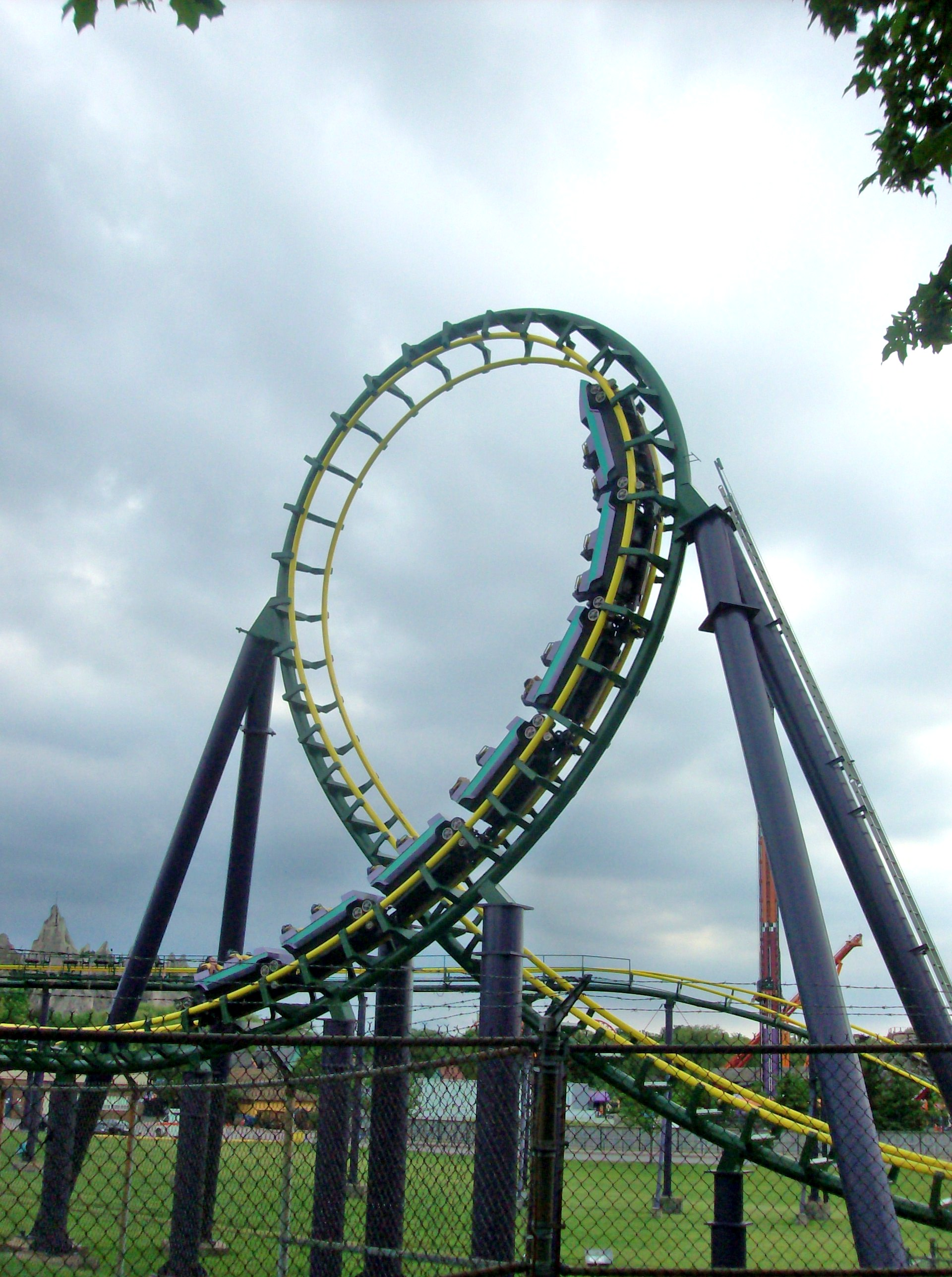
- A vertical loop on Dragon Fyre

Canada's Wonderland
- Location: Canada's Wonderland
- Park section: Medieval Faire
- Coordinates: 43°50′40.16″N 79°32′26.38″W
- Status: Operating
- Opening date: 1981

General statistics
- Type: Steel
- Manufacturer: Arrow Dynamics
- Designer: HUSS Park Attractions
- Model: Custom Looping Coaster
- Lift/launch system: Chain lift
- Height: 23.8 m (78 ft)
- Drop: 23.2 m (76 ft)
- Length: 658.5 m (2,160 ft)
- Speed: 80 km/h (50 mph)
- Inversions: 4
- Duration: 1:30
- Height restriction: 122 cm (4 ft 0 in)
- Trains: 2 trains with 7 cars; riders arranged 2 across in 2 rows for a total of 28 riders per train
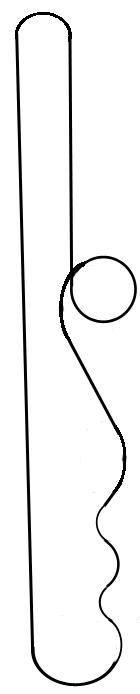
- Layout
- Dragon Fyre at RCDB

Dragon Fyre is a steel roller coaster located at Canada's Wonderland in Vaughan, Ontario, Canada. It was manufactured in 1980 but opened when the park made its debut in 1981. It operated under the name Dragon Fyre from 1981 to 1997, when it was respelled to Dragon Fire. The name was quietly reverted to the original name in 2019. It was one of the four original coasters at Canada's Wonderland.

The ride is built at the east end of the park in the Medieval Faire section. It is located adjacent to the parking lot, so it is one of the first coasters that is seen. The coaster has a green and yellow track with purple support poles. Since the removal of Drachen Fire from Busch Gardens Williamsburg, Dragon Fyre is also the only Arrow Dynamics coaster in existence to have counterclockwise-turning corkscrews.

Dragon Fyre was designed to operate with three trains, which is made evident by the fact that the ride has a set of safety brakes following the corkscrews and before the helix. However, due to the ride's short duration, it would be very difficult for the ride staff to load a train in the station without having one train stop in the middle of the ride. Because of this, Dragon Fyre never used its third train. In 1987, the third train was modified for use on The Bat.

== Ride experience ==
Out of the station, the track makes a left-hand turn and climbs the 23.8 metres (78 ft) lift hill. This leads directly into a 23.2 metres (76 ft) drop to ground level. Levelling out, the track has a short straight segment as it passes through back to back vertical loops and crosses under Leviathan's brake run. After the vertical loops, the track makes a left turn, passing a backstage area, and enters into a counter-clockwise double corkscrew as it crosses back under Leviathan. This is followed by a set of safety brakes, then a clockwise upward helix to end the ride.

== Ride elements ==
- Double Loop
- Double Corkscrew
- Helix Up
