= Mighty Canadian Minebuster =

Roller coaster

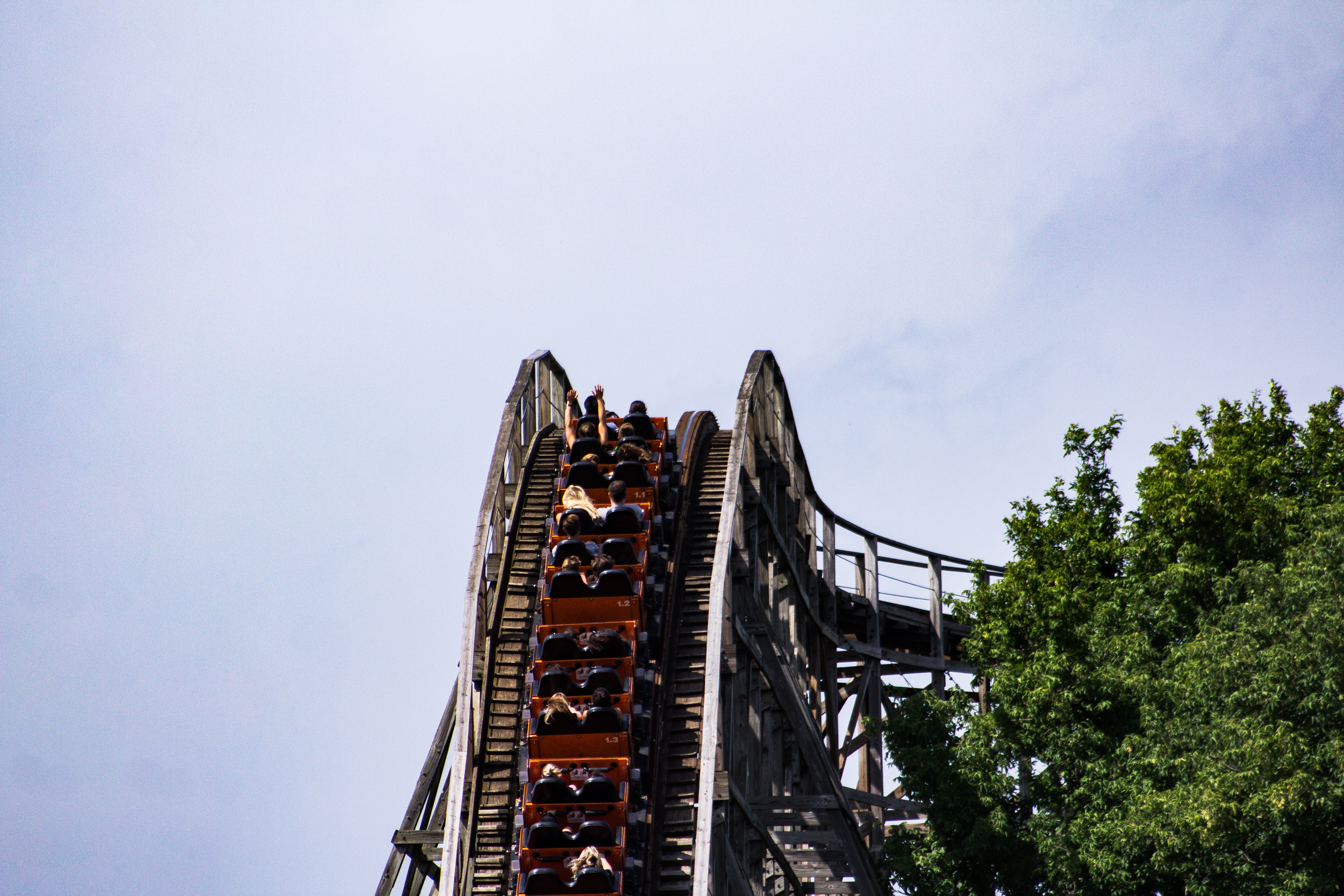
- The Mighty Canadian Minebuster in operation in August 2018

Canada's Wonderland
- Location: Canada's Wonderland
- Park section: Frontier Canada
- Coordinates: 43°50′21″N 79°32′31″W
- Status: Operating
- Opening date: 1981
- Cost: $1.2M est.

General statistics
- Type: Wood
- Manufacturer: Canada's Wonderland Rides
- Designer: Curtis D. Summers
- Track layout: Out and Back
- Lift/launch system: Chain lift hill
- Height: 27.4 m (90 ft)
- Drop: 26.5 m (87 ft)
- Length: 1,166.8 m (3,828 ft)
- Speed: 89.9 km/h (55.9 mph)
- Duration: 2:02
- Height restriction: 122 cm (4 ft 0 in)
- Trains: 2 trains with 5 cars; riders arranged 2 across in 3 rows for a total of 30 riders per train
- Fast Lane available
- Mighty Canadian Minebuster at RCDB

The Mighty Canadian Minebuster (often shortened to Minebuster) is a wooden roller coaster located at Canada's Wonderland amusement park in Vaughan, Ontario, Canada.

== History ==
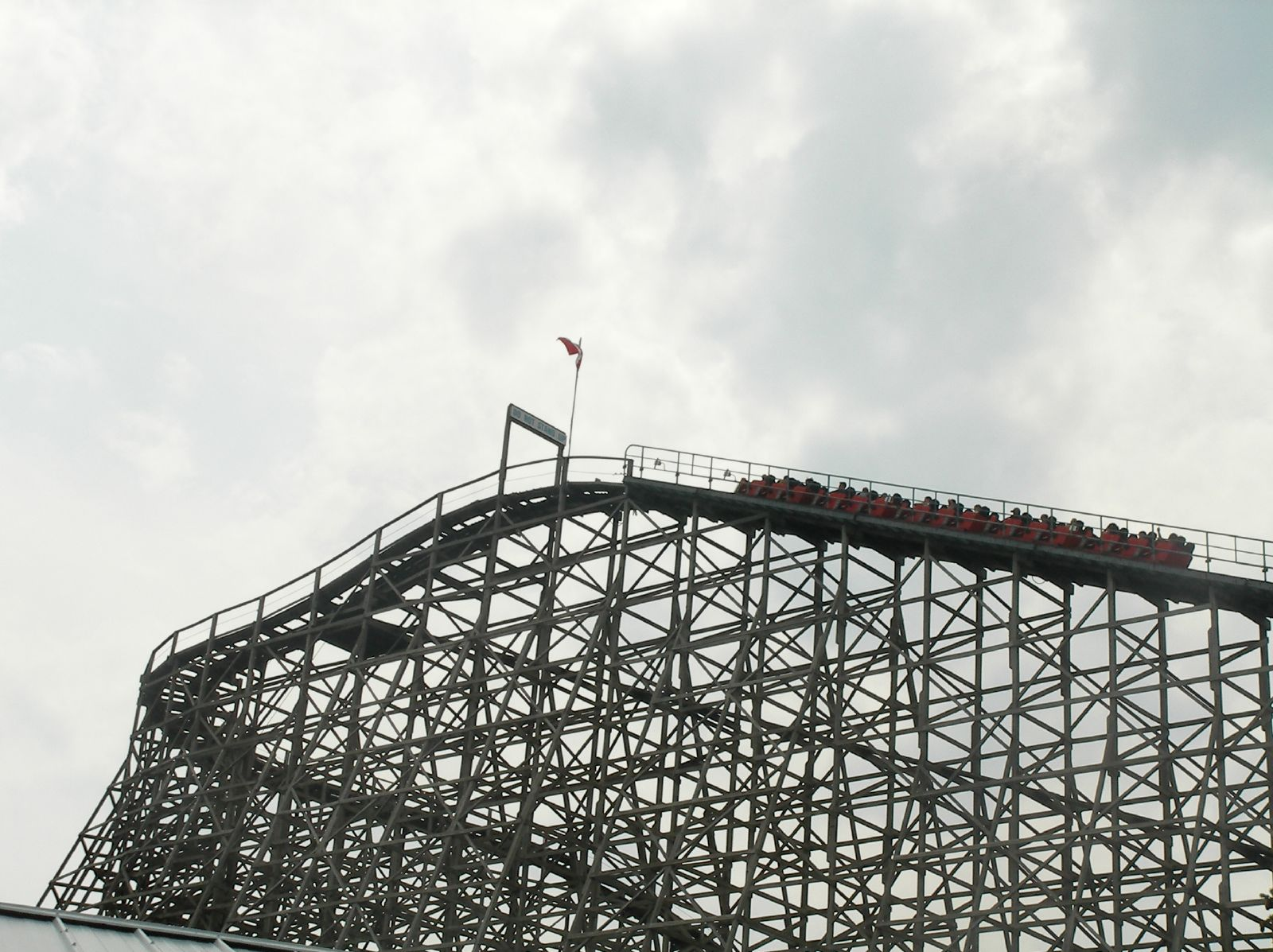
Minebuster making up the chain lift hill, July 2007

Mighty Canadian Minebuster was one of five roller coasters to debut at the park's grand opening on May 23, 1981. It is also modelled after Shooting Star, a roller coaster that used to exist at Coney Island amusement park in Cincinnati, Ohio. It was originally intended to be the centrepiece of a themed area called Frontier Canada, but the idea for the section was abandoned – the section was later built for the 2019 season.

Minebuster is an out and back roller coaster designed by Curtis D. Summers and built in-house. The roller coaster was not built by Philadelphia Toboggan Coasters (PTC), despite a plaque at the operator's booth and several published reports that claim it was. PTC stopped building coasters in 1979. It is likely however, that the construction crew consisted of workers who had previously built coasters for PTC. The two, 30-passenger trains were supplied PTC. Canada's Wonderland's water park, Splash Works, has four sets of slides that pass over Minebuster.

The ride underwent a two stage refurbishing project by The Gravity Group in 2025 and 2026. For the 2025 season, 300 metres (1,000 ft) of track was removed and replaced and the rest of the track was replaced for the 2026 season. A spokesperson for the park stated this would create "a smoother ride and better experience for guests overall"

== Ride layout ==
Minebuster will be familiar to most coaster riders as a modified out and back wooden coaster, specifically with the addition of an upward spiralling helix at the end as the most obvious modification to the traditional out and back layout. The riders make an immediate U-turn to the left after leaving the station, past the storage depot and head up the chain lift hill. At the crest of the lift, the train makes a very small drop and turns right for the big drop. Riders then go through two negative-G hills and pass under a waterslide before climbing up a larger hill and making a turnaround to the right. The ride then drops down and rushes over three smaller hills before entering a banked turn to the left. For a finale, riders roar through a helix inside a tunnel before entering the brake run which stops the train.
