= Iron Dragon (roller coaster) =

Suspended coaster at Cedar Point

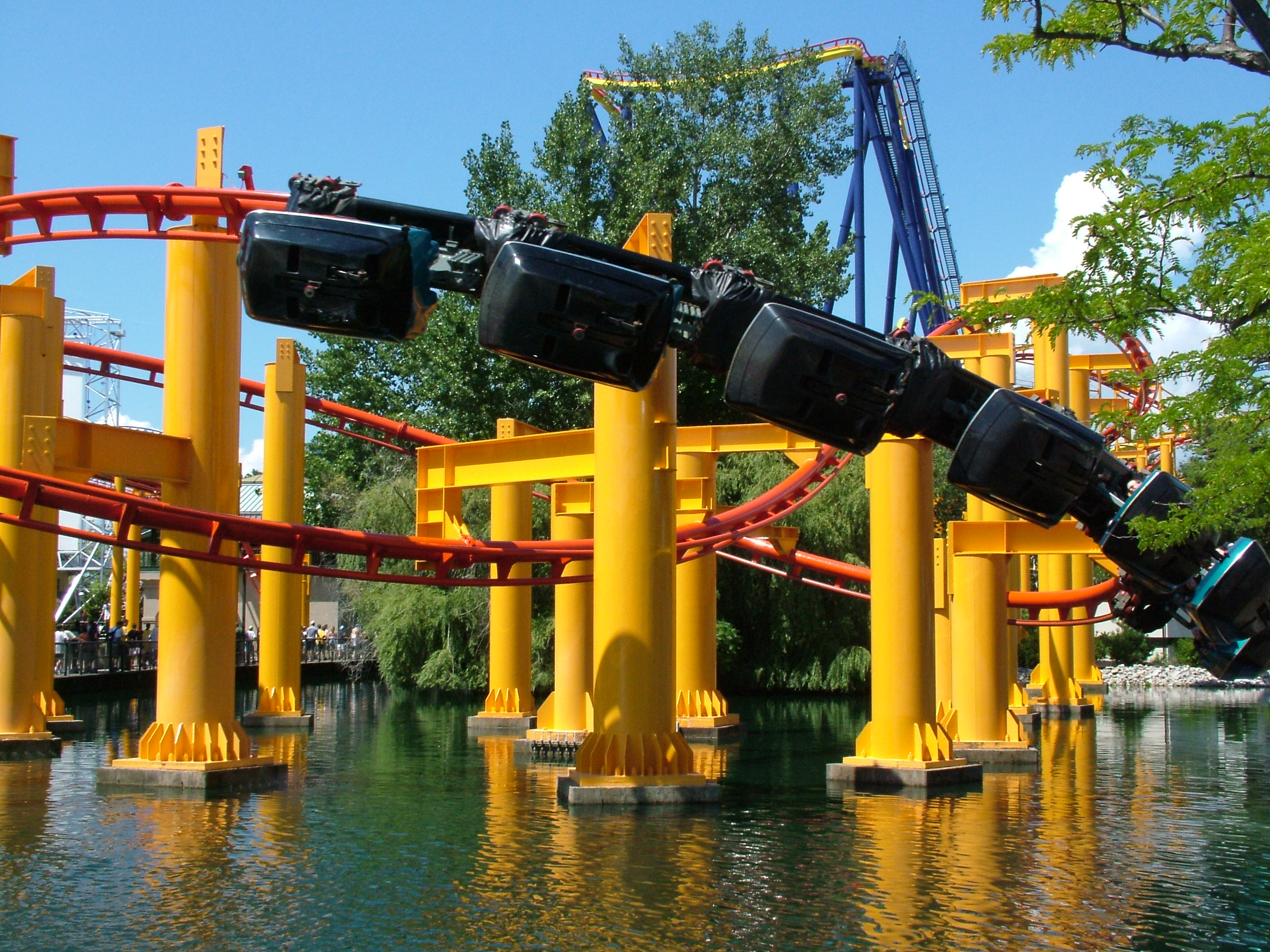
- Iron Dragon in action

Cedar Point
- Location: Cedar Point
- Park section: Millennium Midway
- Coordinates: 41°28′55.75″N 82°41′6.75″W
- Status: Operating
- Opening date: June 11, 1987
- Cost: $4,000,000 USD

General statistics
- Type: Steel – Suspended
- Manufacturer: Arrow Dynamics
- Designer: Ron Toomer
- Model: Suspended Coaster
- Track layout: Terrain roller coaster
- Lift/launch system: Two chain lift hills
- Height: 76 ft (23 m)
- Length: 2,800 ft (850 m)
- Speed: 40 mph (64 km/h)
- Inversions: 0
- Duration: 2:40
- Capacity: 2,000 riders per hour
- Height restriction: 42 in (107 cm)
- Trains: 2 trains with 7 cars; riders arranged 2 across in 2 rows for a total of 28 riders per train
- Fast Lane available
- Iron Dragon at RCDB

Iron Dragon is a suspended roller coaster located at Cedar Point in Sandusky, Ohio. Built in 1987 by Arrow Dynamics, it is located in the Millennium Midway section of the park.

== History ==
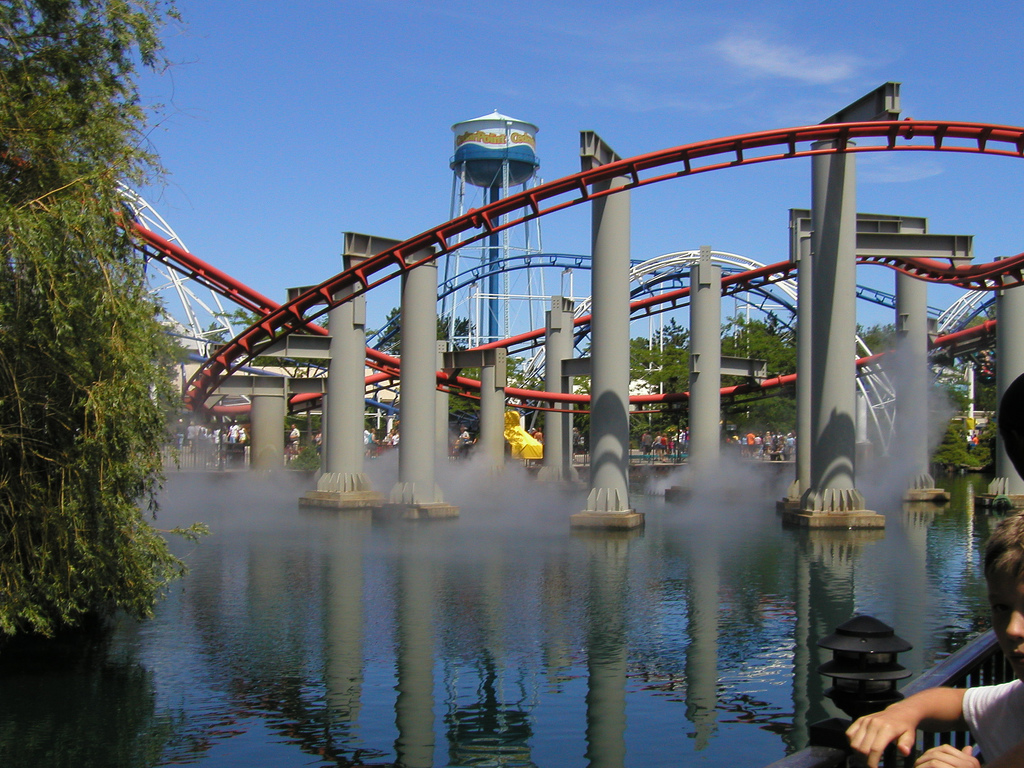
Iron Dragon with red track and gray supports, used before 2004

Before Iron Dragon's 1987 debut, the Western Cruise (later known as Paddlewheel Excursions) boats circumnavigated the waters around this island. The popular boat ride's station sat on the same part of the midway where Iron Dragon's station rests today. (Riders can still spot the docking cleats welded to the dock while climbing the stairs to the boarding station.) The Monster circular ride used to call the land under Iron Dragon's transfer track home. Monster closed on Labor Day weekend in 1986 so Iron Dragon construction could begin. Planning for Iron Dragon began in 1985, the same year the Frontier Lift cable car ride (similar to the Sky Ride found on Cedar Point's main midway) opened for its final season.

In the early and mid-1990s, a "remote a boat" game was housed in the water under Iron Dragon's final helix element. This was removed in 1997.

With the closure of XLR-8 at Astroworld, Eagle Fortress at Everland, and Big Bad Wolf at Busch Gardens Williamsburg, Iron Dragon became the longest operating suspended roller coaster in the world. Iron Dragon is also the oldest of the five remaining suspended coasters built by Arrow Dynamics. For the 2025 season, Iron Dragon was added to Fast Lane.

=== Characteristics ===
Iron Dragon's previous color scheme was red track with gray supports, similar paint schemes to that of Ninja at Six Flags Magic Mountain and Vortex at Canada's Wonderland (both are also Arrow suspended swinging coasters). In 2004, the supports were repainted yellow orange.

=== Virtual reality ===
In July 2016, Cedar Point began testing the use of virtual reality on Iron Dragon, in which riders wear Samsung Gear VR headsets to experience the 3D digital effects. Availability was limited from 6 – 9 p.m, and guests were required to sign up earlier in the day. Following positive feedback, Cedar Point made the new feature permanent on June 9, 2017, but later removed it on September 8, 2018.

== Ride experience ==
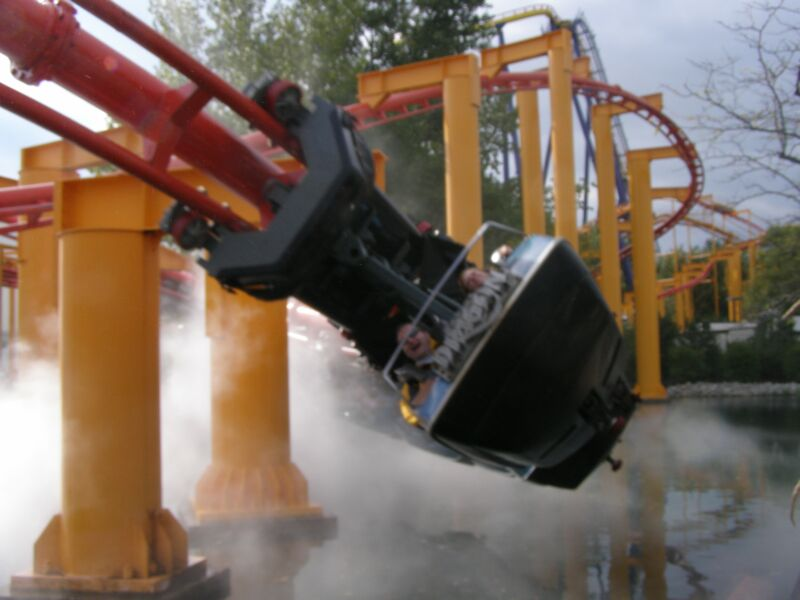
Iron Dragon over near final turns

This type of roller coaster features cars that hang beneath the track by a chassis allowing them to swing side to side. Some parts of the ride are built on artificial lagoons, and the track takes riders into wooded areas and over water. Iron Dragon is one of two roller coasters at Cedar Point to utilize two separate lift hills, the other being Cedar Creek Mine Ride. Both hills are built side by side and head in opposite directions.

After departing the station, the ride turns to the right. After ascending the first lift, which travels partially underneath Rougarou's lift hill and first drop, the ride descends down first drop and then rises into a wide left turn. This leads into a right turn and a near-miss with Rougarou's lift hill, followed by a slight turn to the left and another turn to the right. The ride descends as it continues right and climbs upward, entering a descending 270-degree helix as it passes Top Thrill 2's brake run. The train then enters a brake run and second lift hill, traveling in the opposite direction as the first. The drop off of the second lift is not very steep, with the train navigating a series of gradual curves. After passing under Top Thrill 2's back spike, the train then pulls up into a sharp right turn. The next drop curves left slightly, followed by a right-hand turn and drop into a clockwise helix over the lagoon. Water nozzles that spray mist are positioned under the pretzel-shaped helix, although these do not always run. After exiting the helix, the ride dips and rises once more, turns left and then right, before hitting the final brake run and returning to the station.
