= Ninja (Six Flags Magic Mountain) =

Steel suspended roller coaster

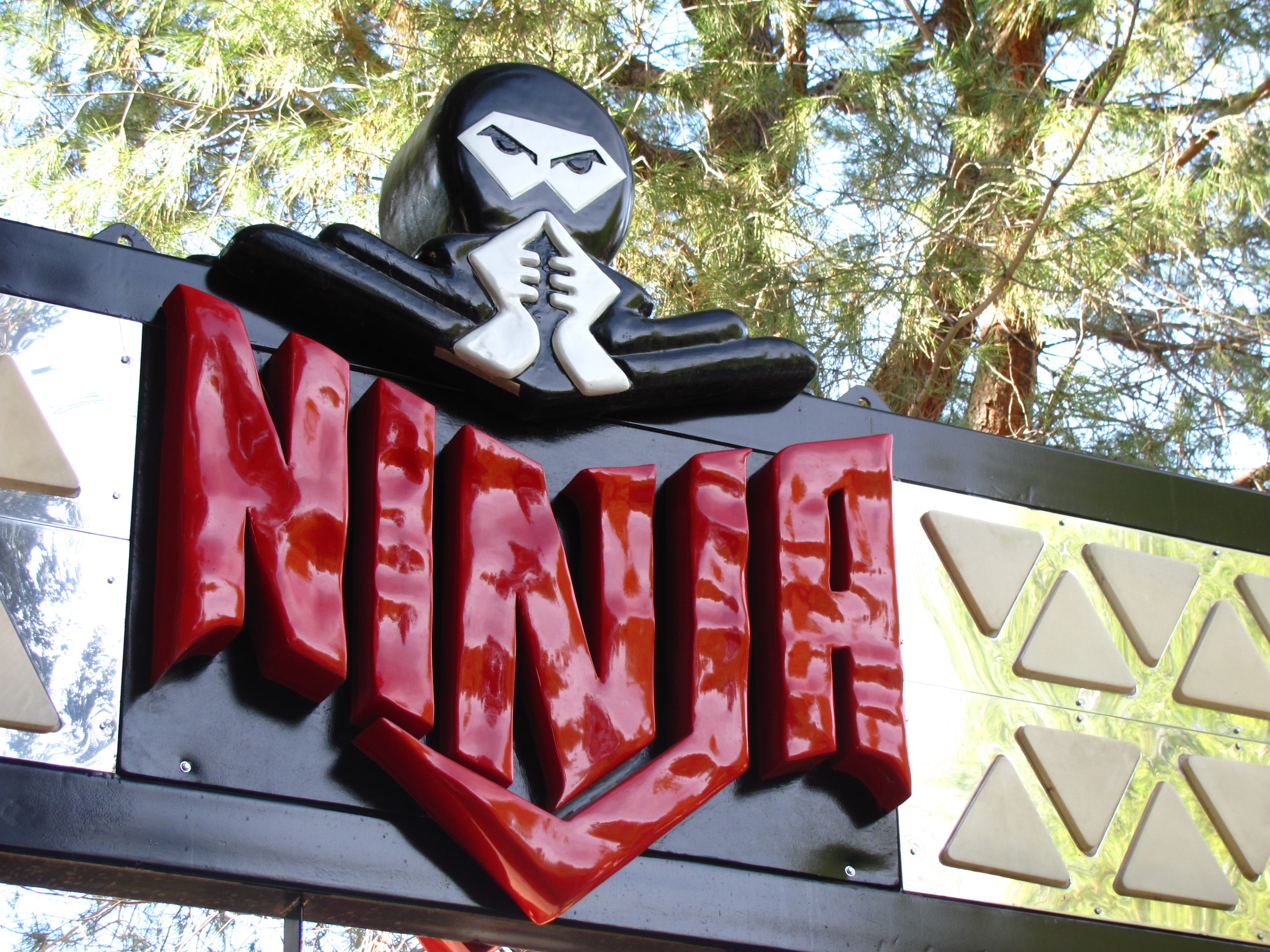

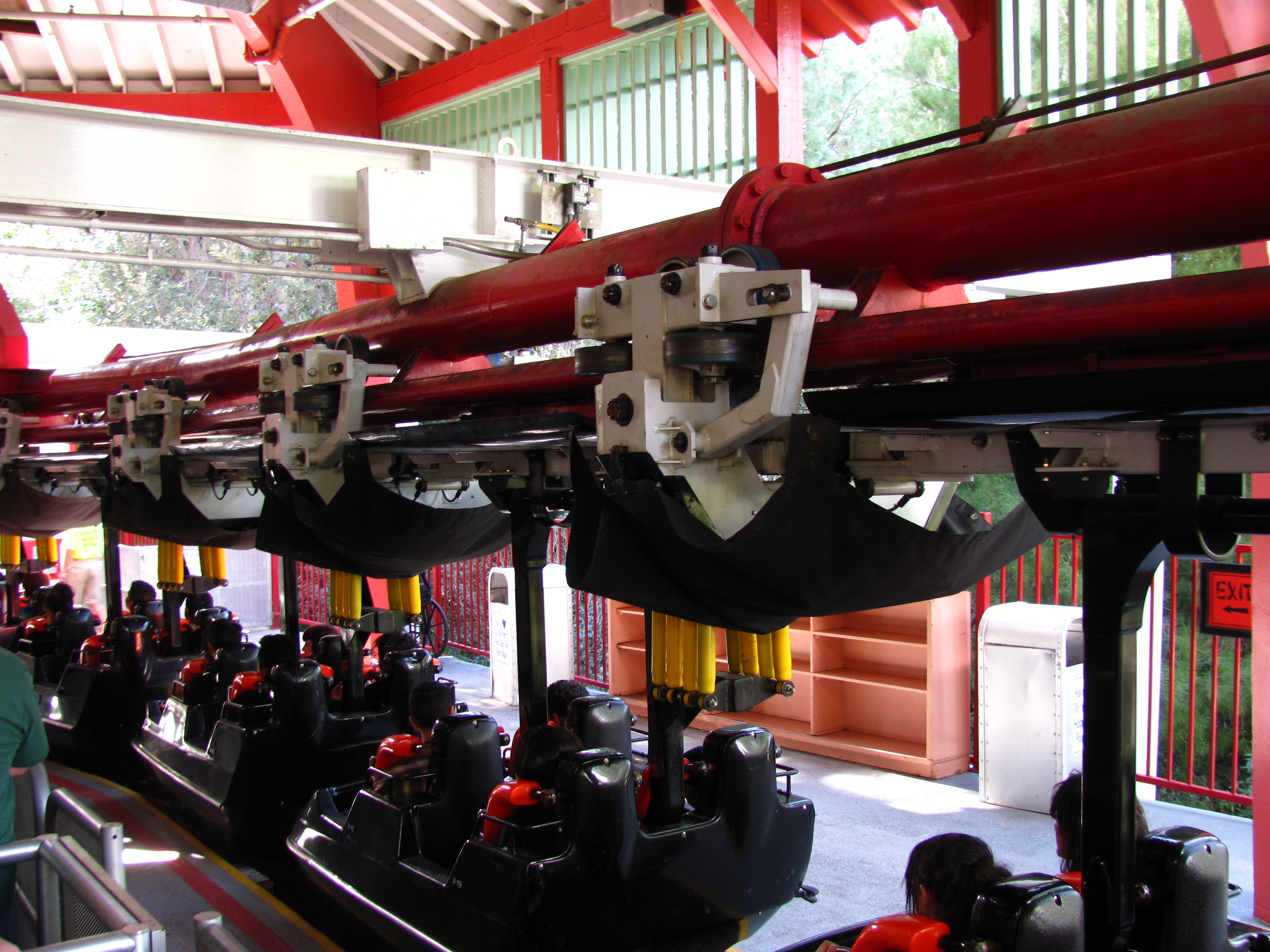

Six Flags Magic Mountain
- Location: Six Flags Magic Mountain
- Park section: Samurai Summit
- Coordinates: 34°25′20″N 118°35′54″W
- Status: Operating
- Opening date: May 21, 1988
- Cost: $6 Million USA

General statistics
- Type: Steel – Suspended
- Manufacturer: Arrow Dynamics
- Designer: Arrow Dynamics
- Model: Suspended Coaster
- Track layout: Terrain
- Lift/launch system: Chain lift hill
- Height: 60 ft (18 m)
- Drop: 85 ft (26 m)
- Length: 2,700 ft (820 m)
- Speed: 55 mph (89 km/h)
- Inversions: 0
- Duration: 1:30
- Max vertical angle: 36°
- Capacity: 1,600 riders per hour
- G-force: 2.9
- Height restriction: 42 in (107 cm)
- Trains: 3 trains with 7 cars. Riders are arranged 2 across in 2 rows for a total of 28 riders per train.
- Fast Lane available
- Must transfer from wheelchair
- Ninja at RCDB

Ninja is a suspended roller coaster located at Six Flags Magic Mountain in Valencia, California. It is the fastest roller coaster of its kind in the world, joint with Vortex at Canada's Wonderland, both with top speeds of 55 mph (89 km/h).

== History ==
On December 9, 1987, Six Flags Magic Mountain announced that Ninja would be added to the park. The attraction opened on May 21, 1988.

The coaster is located in the Samurai Summit area of Six Flags Magic Mountain in Valencia, California. Upon opening, Ninja was the fifth of the ten original Arrow suspended coasters. It is somewhat unusual in that it uses two lift hills — one at the beginning of the ride and a second one just before the end, to return the train to station elevation.

Ninja's station building previously served as the upper station for Six Flags Magic Mountain's Dragon tram. The tram carried passengers up and down the hillside until its closure in 1981, and its abandoned lower station can still be found near Jet Stream's station and Ninja's final brake run.

Ninja is the only Arrow Dynamics suspended coaster west of the Mississippi River. The other three suspended coasters in North America (Vortex at Canada's Wonderland, Iron Dragon at Cedar Point and The Bat at Kings Island) are all east of the Mississippi.

The station building is designed to resemble elements of Japanese architecture, and features several large renditions of classic Japanese woodblock prints of popular Kabuki actors of the Edo period, mostly by Tōshūsai Sharaku.

Soon after Six Flags Astroworld was shut down in 2005, the trains from their suspended XLR-8 were brought to Six Flags Magic Mountain to be used on Ninja.

Ninja received a fresh coat of paint for the 2007 season; the ride was repainted with bright red track and white supports.

In 2008, Six Flags Magic Mountain installed a new control system for Ninja.

== Incidents ==
- On August 30, 2008, at approximately 4 p.m. PDT, 20-year-old Michael Rohrer of West Hollywood, California was struck by a coaster vehicle passing overhead after he entered a restricted area below the ride by scaling two 6-foot perimeter fences to retrieve a lost hat. He was treated at the scene by park first aid, then airlifted to the Ronald Reagan UCLA Medical Center in Los Angeles in comatose condition. He was pronounced dead on August 31, 2008, at approximately 2 a.m. PDT. Cause of death was attributed to blunt force trauma.
- On the evening of July 7, 2014, a pine tree branch fell across the coaster's track, causing the first car of the train to derail, stranding the riders aboard. Four people were injured in the accident and two were treated in the hospital, all for minor injuries. Twelve days after the incident, Six Flags Magic Mountain reopened the coaster on July 19, 2014.

== See also ==
- Incidents at Six Flags parks
