= XLR =

XLR may refer to:

- XLR connector, an electrical connector commonly used in audio equipment
- Cadillac XLR, a retractable hardtop convertible automobile
- Megas XLR, an American animated television series
- X-linked recessive inheritance
- XL programming language runtime
- A321XLR, a variant of the Airbus A321neo airliner

== XLR8 ("accelerate") ==
- XLR8, a Filipino boy band
- XLR8, a character in Ben 10
- "XLR8", a song from Peter Andre's 2010 album Accelerate
- XLR-8, a roller coaster
- XLR8R, a web magazine
- XLR8R (album), a 2001 album by Orbit
- XLR8er, a 1987 CPU board produced by H.I. Tech
