= The Bat (Kings Island; opened 1981) =

Defunct roller coaster at Kings Island

Kings Island
- Location: Kings Island
- Park section: Coney Mall
- Coordinates: 39.340757°N 84.26459°W
- Status: Removed
- Soft opening date: April 22, 1981
- Opening date: April 26, 1981
- Closing date: August 1983
- Cost: $3,800,000
- Replaced by: Vortex

General statistics
- Type: Steel – Suspended
- Manufacturer: Arrow Development
- Lift/launch system: 2 chain lift hills
- Height: 100 ft (30 m)
- Length: 2,456 ft (749 m)
- Speed: 34 mph (55 km/h)
- Inversions: 0
- Capacity: 1700 riders per hour
- Trains: 3 trains with 7 cars; riders arranged 2 across in 2 rows for a total of 28 riders per train
- The Bat at RCDB

The Bat was a suspended roller coaster located at Kings Island amusement park in Mason, Ohio. Designed by Arrow Development, it was billed as the "first of its kind" in the world when it opened to the public on April 26, 1981. The suspended coaster concept was a radical departure from traditional roller coaster design, where guests ride below the track instead of above. Previous attempts to build coasters that hang from the track were unsuccessful and date as far back as the early 20th century. Arrow solved issues by utilizing modern technology in the design, including its tubular steel track developed in 1959 for Disneyland's Matterhorn Bobsleds.

Arrow constructed a working prototype in 1978 capturing Kings Island's interest, and their engineering department assisted with the development, construction, and maintenance of the ride. The Bat required 18 months of design and two years of manufacturing and assembly. The anticipation leading up to the reveal and opening was intense, as park officials disclosed very little while construction was taking place in view of park guests. Despite a successful launch and reception, the suspended coaster was plagued with mechanical problems and frequent closures over the course of its short lifespan. After a sporadic three seasons, the ride was permanently closed in 1983 and removed from the park. Arrow implemented improved banking and braking design in future installations that were more successful, such as Big Bad Wolf at Busch Gardens Williamsburg, which opened in 1984.

== History ==
In the mid-1970s, Arrow Development began work on a new roller coaster design, where riders are seated below the track and able to swing from side to side around sharp turns. It was a concept the company coined as "suspended", and it was considered revolutionary at the time. Although the concept wasn't entirely new, with unsuccessful attempts of manufacturing suspended roller coasters dating back to the early 20th century, Arrow was able to utilize their tubular steel track technology to succeed where others failed. Tubular track was developed by Arrow during their partnership with Disneyland on Matterhorn Bobsleds, Arrow's first coaster which opened in 1959.

The tubular design proved dependable and led to unique track designs that wooden coasters were incapable of. Following on the heels of their success with mine train coasters in the 1960s and looping steel coasters in the 1970s, Arrow believed the suspended coaster concept represented the next era for roller coasters. They built a working prototype at their facility in Mountain View, California, and invited Kings Island executives to visit and test ride in 1978. Prior to the opening of The Beast in 1979, Kings Island was already in the initial stages of planning their next major ride and had turned to Arrow for ideas. In turn, Arrow needed a financial partner to move past the concept phase and build the first full-scale, permanent installation. Kings Island gladly accepted and decided to invest in the new concept, supplying land and support from their in-house engineering department. Work on the new coaster began immediately, taking 18 months to plan and design before construction could begin.

=== Marketing and construction ===
Construction was underway by the start of Kings Island's 1980 season. Park guests were intrigued and confused by sections of track, which appeared upside down, being built in the Coney Mall area of the park. The structure was easily viewed from the midway, which also garnered attention from local press looking for details. Kings Island officials remained relatively quiet, however, only referring to the attraction as a "revolutionary new thrill ride". A vast amount of free publicity was generated from guests and media speculation, and General Manager William Price teased The Cincinnati Post by saying, "It’s a totally new concept ... There’s nothing like it in the whole world!"

Kings Island invited local press to a media event revealing the new ride on October 29, 1980. Guests were led to the roller coaster's station, which was recently constructed and resembled a mansion from the Victorian era. A rendering of the coaster's layout as well as one of the coaster's trains were on display. There were also employees dressed as Halloween characters, including Dracula, Frankenstein, and a human-sized bat. F.R. Bush, recently named Vice President and General Manager, revealed the new ride as The Bat, a suspended roller coaster where riders would not have "the psychological security of the steel tracks or wooden support beams below them". Bat heads sculpted by Kings Island's art department were attached to the front of each car, which would eventually become a part of the ride's logo.

Construction of The Bat was completed in November 1980 following 24 months of manufacturing, shipping, and assembly. Over one million pounds (450,000 kg) of tubular steel were required, along with 2.5 million pounds (1,100,000 kg) of concrete, 180 four-inch pipe welds, 90 twelve-inch pipe welds, 162 saddle welds, and 100,000 steel anchor bolts. The materials were used to form 162 support columns and 2,456 feet (749 m) of track, that together required twisted tubular steel that stretched over 4 miles (6.4 km) in total length. Cars were able to swing freely up to 90 degrees and would reach a maximum speed of 34 mph (55 km/h). The main computer system monitoring the mechanical and safety performance of the ride involved 62 sensors placed throughout the track layout, all connected by more than 52,000 feet (16,000 m) of copper wire. Speed and other control systems could be adjusted based on signals received from the sensors.

Before testing, engineers built mock cars made of plywood and moved them throughout the length of the course to test clearance. The first trains were dispatched on April 4, 1981. Although positive statements were released to the press, engineers behind the scenes were facing significant issues. The safety monitoring system was overly sensitive, even with only one train on the track, causing frequent downtime and the inability to run multiple trains. Each train was also moving faster than engineers planned, leading to aggressive swinging beyond what the trains were designed to handle. Additional shock absorbers were installed to reduce the intensity of the swing, and for the three weeks prior to the ride's opening, the park continued to make adjustments. In an effort to prepare guests, park officials briefed local media reminding them the ride was a prototype and should be expected to act "temperamental".

=== Opening and operational issues ===
A soft opening was held for the media on April 22, 1981. Billed as the "first of its kind" in the world, The Bat officially opened to the public four days later. Shortly before The Bat's debut, Huss Maschinenfabrik purchased Arrow Development and the company became known as Arrow Huss.

The Bat experienced significant maintenance issues early on. Engineers discovered substantial, premature wear on each car's shock absorbers, and they had to be replaced daily. The safety mechanism would "lock-up" periodically, shutting down the ride and requiring a complete survey of the track by engineers before it could reopen. If the shut down occurred while a train was ascending one of the lift hills, the train would stall and require evacuation. Chain dog mechanisms, responsible for engaging the lift chain and prevent backward descent of the train, would occasionally become misaligned, leading to bending or breaks. It was becoming particularly problematic at the base of the second lift hill, caused by the swinging of cars as the train entered. The ride's wait times would often exceed three hours due to the frequent downtime, and the line would stretch as far back as the entrance to The Racer on the opposite end of Coney Mall. In light of mounting issues, the park closed the ride on July 24, 1981. Chipped paint was being patched daily before the ride opened, but it had the tendency to flake or drip during operation. The extended downtime allowed time to repaint and modify the alignment of chain dogs. The Bat reopened on July 28, 1981.

Engineers from Kings Island and Arrow were staffed on site daily to keep The Bat fully operational. Park management had to routinely hand out free vouchers and coupons to guests waiting in line when the ride would close. They also relied on signs to communicate closures, including the digital park sign near Interstate 71 and sandwich boards placed around the park. On August 20, 1981, The Bat suffered another extended closure to allow time for Arrow Huss to analyze issues with the brake system. Each car had a fin underneath that would slot into a narrow channel containing "pinch brakes", which were responsible for slowing or stopping the train. The swinging motion often caused these fins to become misaligned, resulting in damage to the fins. Also, the brake system engaged from below the train and failed to adequately stop the momentum of the heavy chassis overhead, creating stress on the frames and carriage. The system was overhauled by extending brake runs and redesigning train guides, which reduced the ride's overall speed but helped control swinging where trains encountered stopping points. The Bat reopened nearly a month later over Labor Day weekend.

After the 1981 season, Arrow began work to address other issues. The trains were overhauled, including a modification to the over-the-shoulder restraints, which were fitted with flatter collars to reduce head-banging and improve the ride experience. The safety monitoring system and its sensors were also modified extensively. Additional stress cables were installed in the support structure to help dissipate the strain caused by the outward pull when a train traversed the helices. The entire attraction was also repainted.

The following season, The Bat briefly operated over the first four weekends until May 21, 1982, when the ride suffered another mechanical malfunction. A deeper analysis revealed that the high lateral forces from trains and the lack of banking around turns was damaging the welds that attached the track to supports. The overall integrity of the support structure was compromised, and Kings Island lost confidence in the ride's ability to operate safely. The following month on June 3, the park announced that The Bat would remain closed indefinitely, and it failed to operate for the remainder of the season. As a consolation to guests, Kings Island began running the south side train of The Racer backward, which was well-received and became a permanent decision – one that would last until 2008 when new owners Cedar Fair reverted it back.

The Bat reopened a year after its closure on May 21, 1983. Additional modifications included the shortening of each train to six cars, an increase of horsepower on the lift hills, and further strengthening of the support structure. The number of shock absorbers on each car was also increased to six to help extend the life of each one. The coaster continued normal operation with occasional downtime but without major issues through July 1983, when it was closed briefly for repair. After operating again for a short time, it closed abruptly in early August 1983 and never reopened.

=== Closure and demolition ===
In March 1984, Kings Island announced that The Bat would remain closed for the upcoming season as they continued to review issues preventing consistent operation. They expressed hope that it would operate again eventually. In the meantime, the park focused on opening a new ride called King Cobra, which was the first roller coaster designed from inception as a stand-up model. Following months of review, Kings Island concluded that further modifications to The Bat would be too expensive and announced on November 6, 1984, that the ride would be removed. Demolition cost the park $70,000, and over 500 tons of steel were scrapped. The Journal-Herald published images of the ride being dismantled in April 1985.

The Bat had given approximately 1.8 million rides total during its tenure over three seasons, fewer than what other coasters such as The Beast could accomplish in a single season. Despite The Bat's relatively short lifespan, Arrow continued to improve the suspended roller coaster design in future releases. The company forged ahead releasing XLR-8 at Six Flags AstroWorld and Big Bad Wolf at Busch Gardens Williamsburg in 1984. Both roller coasters successfully operated for more than two decades. Arrow separated from Huss in 1985, but the reemerged Arrow Dynamics designed and built several other suspended models over the years, some of which remain in operation.

In November 1992, Kings Island announced that they would be receiving a new Arrow suspended coaster. It would be named Top Gun and officially open on April 9, 1993. Following Cedar Fair's purchase of the park in 2006, the ride was renamed Flight Deck in 2008 in an effort to remove the Paramount Parks branding. In 2014, it was renamed again to The Bat in honor of the original, receiving a new color scheme and updated logo.

== Ride experience ==
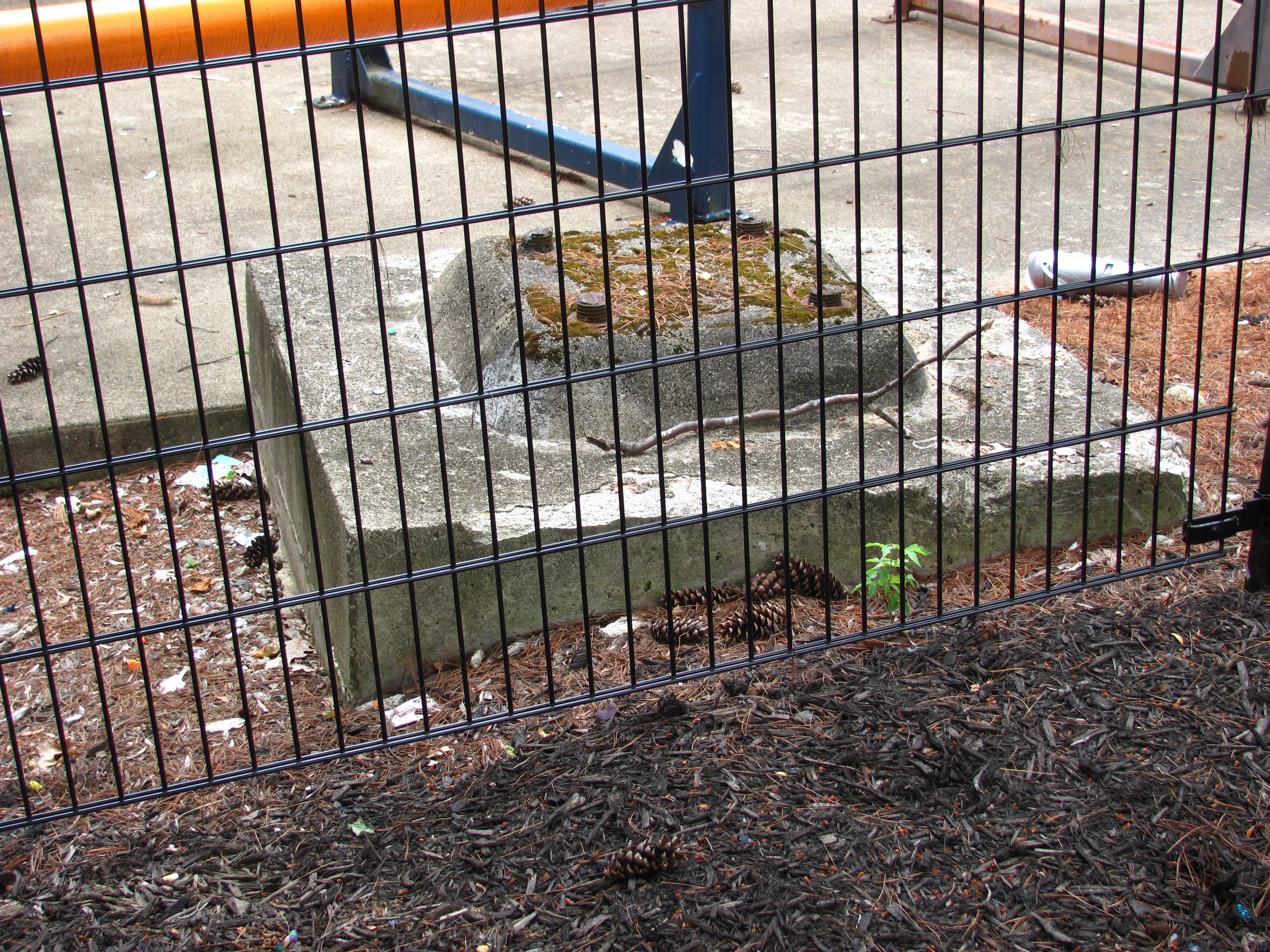
An old footing remnant of The Bat captured in 2012.

When the ride vehicles exited the station, they made a right turn and climbed the first 100-foot (30 m) lift hill. At the top, they went through the first left-handed spiral drop. This was followed by a right turn. After going through an s-curve, the ride vehicles traveled through the first helix. The ride vehicles made a left turn shortly before climbing the second 100-foot (30 m) lift hill. They turned right and then entered the second left-handed spiral drop. After dropping, the ride vehicles turned right and entered a series of curves. An upward incline and a right turn led into the second helix. Following this helix, the ride vehicles entered a tight section of track. They made a left turn as they began to slow down. The ride vehicles made a right turn, hitting the brakes and returning to the station.

== Aftermath ==
An Arrow Dynamics looping coaster named Vortex, the first roller coaster to feature six inversions, was built in The Bat's former location. It reutilized the same station and operated through 2019. Several remnants of The Bat were still visible while Vortex was in operation, including concrete footings, station, and queue line.

The Bat was originally designed to feature two corkscrew inversions that were 60 feet (18 m) long and had proper leads in and out to allow for optimal g-forces. The corkscrews were later replaced with helices. A blueprint of The Bat's original layout can be found in the queue of Orion.
