= Vortex (Canada's Wonderland) =

Suspended roller coaster

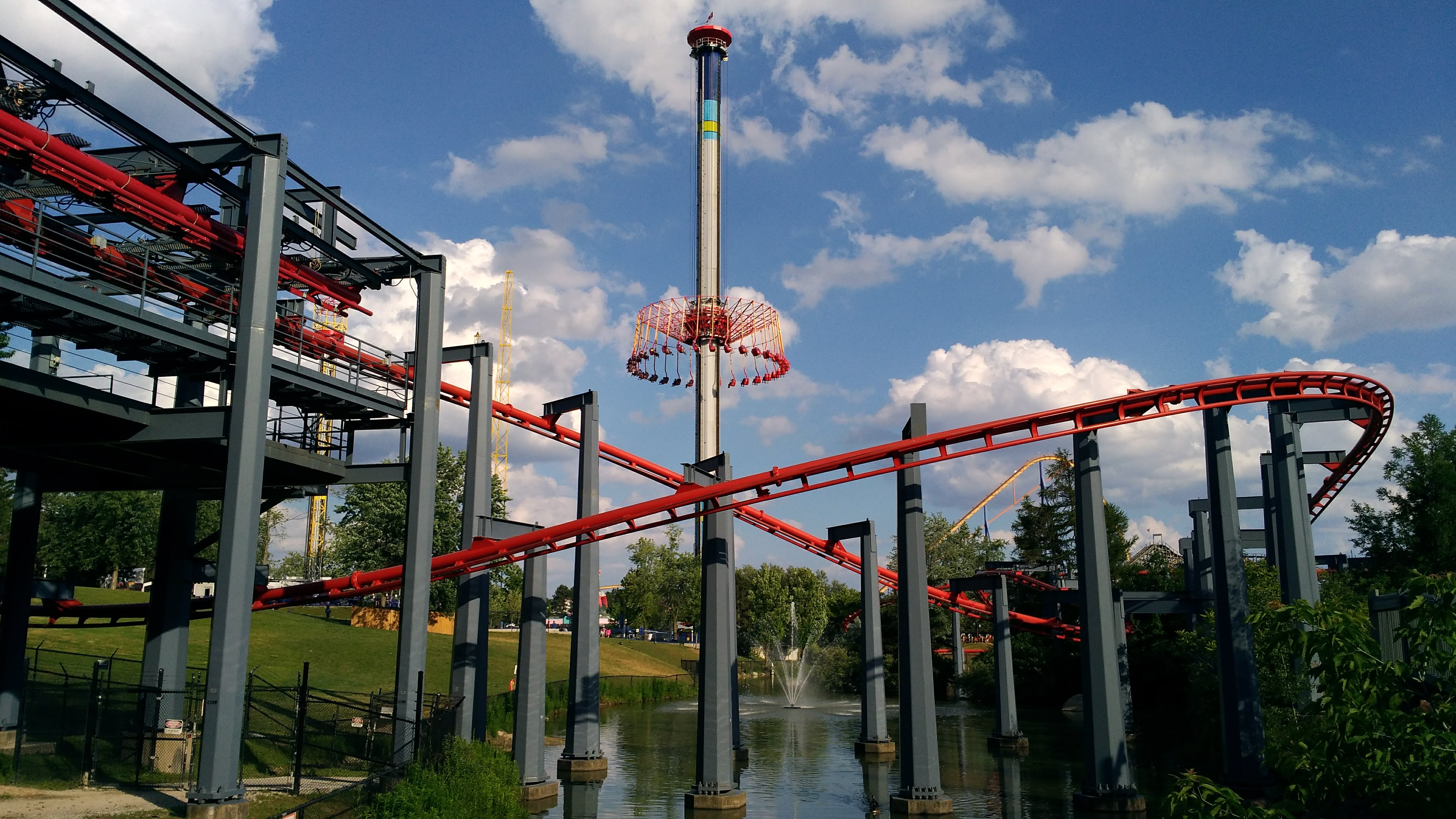
- View of the ride portion that extends over the river at the park.

Canada's Wonderland
- Location: Canada's Wonderland
- Park section: Frontier Canada
- Coordinates: 43°50′30.89″N 79°32′36.44″W
- Status: Operating
- Opening date: 12 May 1991

General statistics
- Type: Steel – Suspended
- Manufacturer: Arrow Dynamics
- Model: Suspended Coaster
- Track layout: Terrain
- Lift/launch system: Chain lift hill
- Height: 27.8 m (91 ft)
- Drop: 26 m (85 ft)
- Length: 719.5 m (2,361 ft)
- Speed: 89 km/h (55 mph)
- Duration: 1:36
- Height restriction: 107 cm (3 ft 6 in)
- Trains: 2 trains with 6 cars; riders arranged 2 across in 2 rows for a total of 24 riders per train
- Fast Lane available
- Vortex at RCDB

Vortex is a suspended roller coaster at Canada's Wonderland in Vaughan, Ontario, Canada. It officially opened during the 1991 season.

As with other suspended roller coasters, Vortex's trains swing under the track. On Vortex, riders are taken up through the top of the mountain and dropped at high speeds. At some points in the ride, the trains swing just above a river running through the middle of the park, giving riders the illusion that the train will touch the water. It is the fastest roller coaster of its kind in the world, together with Ninja at Six Flags Magic Mountain, both with top speeds of 89 kilometres per hour (55 mph). It is also the tallest currently operating suspended coaster in the world, reaching a height of 27.8 metres (91 ft). It is considered to be a terrain coaster due to the influences of the ride track by the mountain and the river.

== Ride experience ==
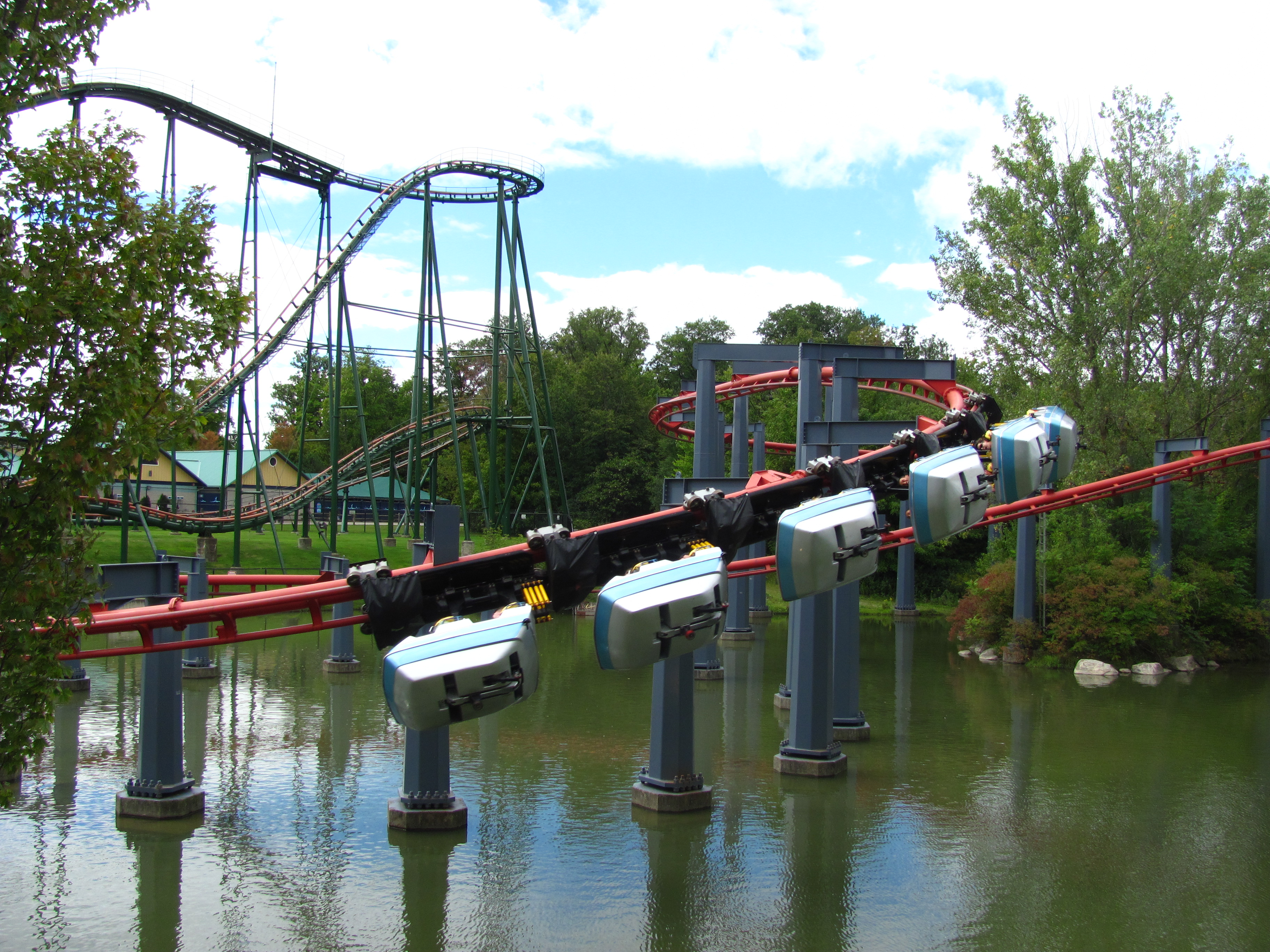
View of the ride's train during operation. The ride's trains are able to swing side to side.

Like other suspended roller coasters, the ride's trains are able to swing side to side. The train climbs the 30-metre (98 ft) lift hill immediately after departing the loading station. The lift takes riders up to the top of Wonder Mountain. Upon cresting the lift, the train slowly turns to the right adding to the suspense of the upcoming drop. After passing beneath AlpenFury's double-inverting top hat, the train then quickly dives off the side of the mountain, passing under the track of Wonder Mountain's Guardian and AlpenFury's zero-g roll. The train then sweeps to the right and climbs up the "fan-turn" element of the ride that flies over guests on the midway. The track then sweeps back down over the grass and above the river, swooping left and right at 89 km/h (55 mph). The train dives into a downward helix, which swings only a few feet above the surface of the water and wraps around Yukon Striker's first drop. Upon returning to the station, the train swoops left and right a few times more until it charges into the brake run. The immense swinging force as the train enters the brake run causes the cars to swing even after the train stops moving. The ride then turns right back into the station.

== Similar rides ==
The Bat (formerly Top Gun & Flight Deck) was built in 1993 at Wonderland's sister park Kings Island. It has a near identical layout to Vortex, but there are notable differences. They include speed and height variances and the addition of another car to each train, allowing for 28 passengers per train as opposed to 24.
