= Suspended roller coaster =

Type of steel roller coaster

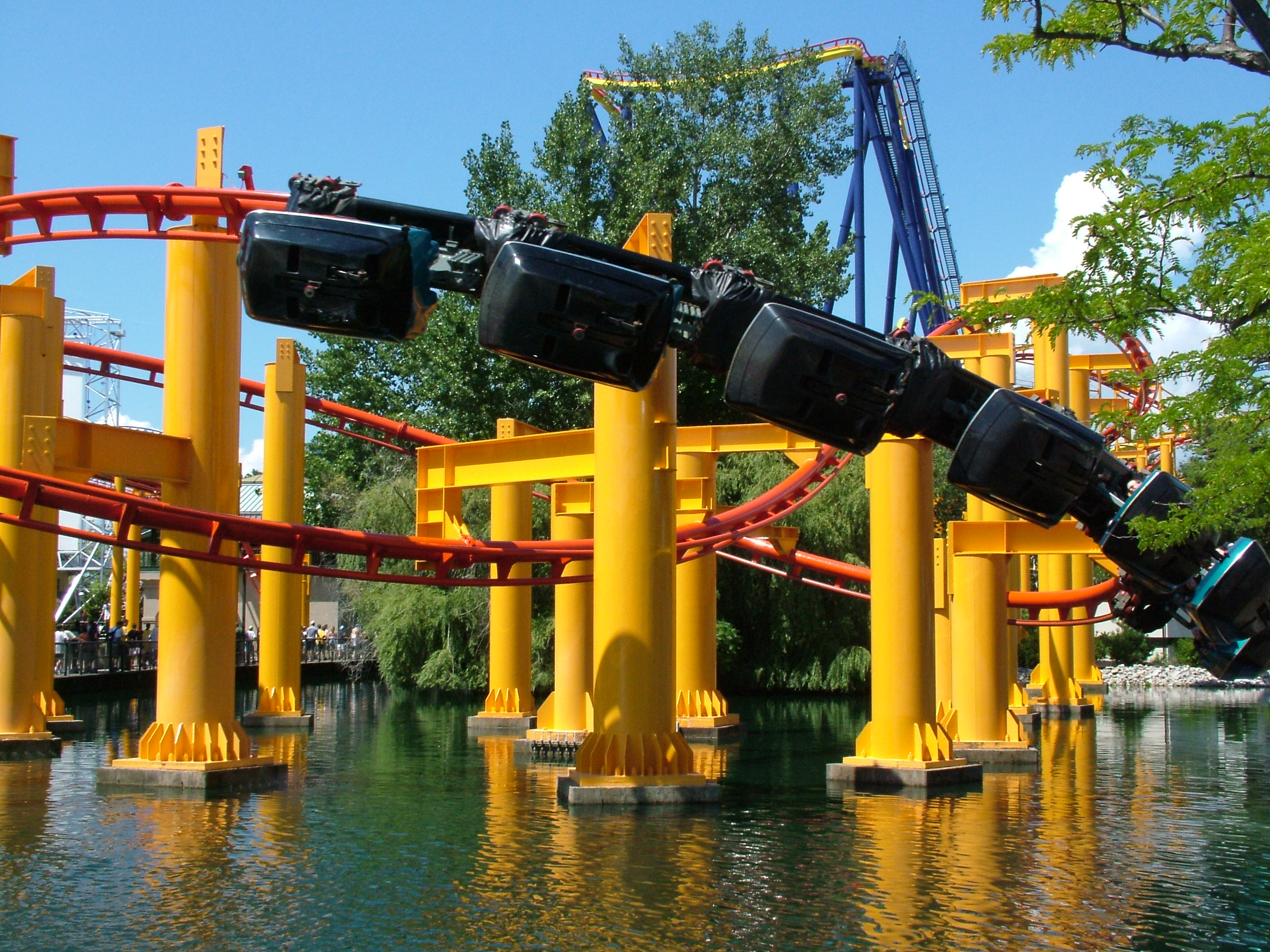
- Trains swinging on an Arrow Development manufactured suspended roller coaster Iron Dragon at Cedar Point
- Status: In production
- First manufactured: 1902
- No. of installations: About 37
- Manufacturers: Arrow Development, Aerial Tramway Construction Co., Big Country Motioneering, Caripro, R&C Entertainment, Setpoint, and Vekoma

A suspended roller coaster is a type of steel roller coaster in which the car hangs from the bottom of the rolling stock by a pivoting fulcrum or hinge assembly. This allows the car and riders to swing side to side as the train races along the track. Due to the swing designs, these roller coasters cannot invert riders.

== History ==
One of the earliest suspended roller coasters was known as Bisby's Spiral Airship, built in Long Beach, California in the early 1900s. Riders on Bisby's Spiral Airship rode in square gondolas suspended from the track above, which were then carried via lift hill to the top of a tower. The gondolas then rolled down the track, which spiraled down the tower back to the loading platform. The attraction operated at least until the mid-1910s.

In 1975, German aircraft manufacturer Messerschmitt debuted Alpenflug at the annual Oktoberfest fair in Munich, Germany. Featuring multi-car trains and a 2700-foot twisting, spiraling layout, Alpenflug was a hit during the 16-day fair. However, the design was scrapped after analysis revealed significant stress in the track, whose curves were not banked, and in the wheel assemblies, as the train's brake fins were located at the bottom of the train's gondolas instead of near the track itself.

The first permanent modern suspended roller coaster was The Bat at Kings Island. Built by Arrow Development, The Bat opened April 21, 1981, but it was soon plagued with problems. The problems included: excessive stress on the support springs due to the unbanked curved track sections and stress on the wheels because the brakes were mounted at bottom of the swinging cars. Kings Island's US$3.8 million ride closed in 1983 and was later scheduled for demolition. The Bat's former site was occupied by the Arrow designed looping coaster Vortex until its demolition in 2019. The suspended coaster would return to Kings Island in 1993 with the addition of Top Gun, which after a period of being called Flight Deck, was renamed The Bat in 2014, a reference to the original 1981 coaster.

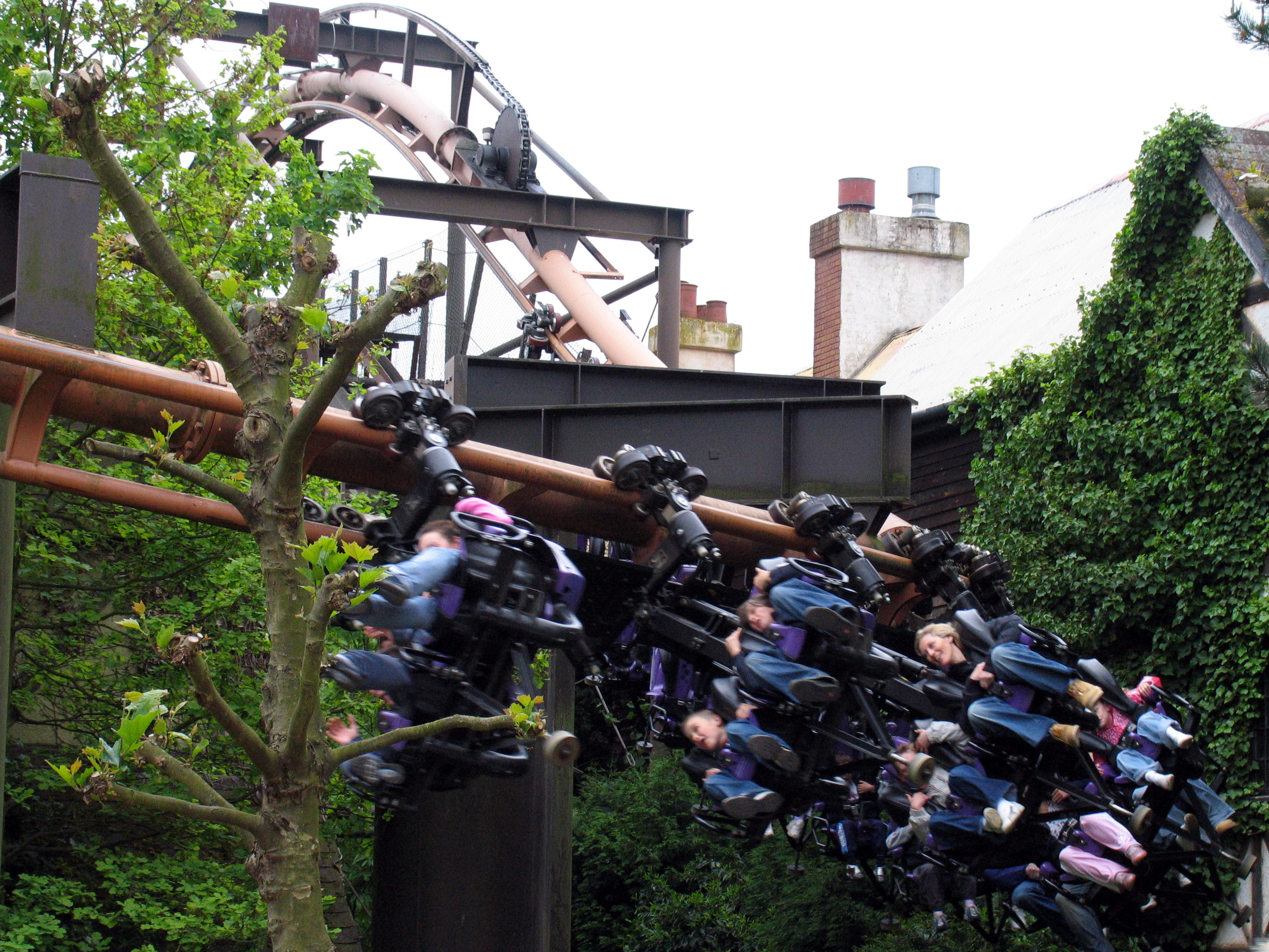
The Vampire at Chessington World of Adventures

Arrow-Huss refined its suspended roller coaster designs, culminating in the debut of The Big Bad Wolf at Busch Gardens Williamsburg and XLR-8 at Six Flags Astroworld in 1984. After 1984, as Arrow Dynamics, they manufactured ten suspended roller coasters, including Iron Dragon at Cedar Point, Ninja at Six Flags Magic Mountain, Vampire at Chessington World of Adventures, and Vortex at Canada's Wonderland.

Other manufacturers have also constructed their variations on the suspended roller coaster. Before contacting Arrow-Huss for The Big Bad Wolf, Busch Gardens contacted Anton Schwarzkopf to design a suspended coaster, dubbed the "Flugbahn". However, Schwarzkopf went bankrupt, completing only a model and the footers of the actual coaster. Dutch designer Vekoma manufactured a suspended model dubbed "Swinging Turns," of which three copies were constructed. Vekoma offers both Arrow-style traditional car designs as well as floorless cars where the riders' feet dangle, similar to Vekoma's inverted coasters but the cars are able to swing. In 2001, Vampire at Chessington World of Adventures was modified to use Vekoma's floorless trains. Caripro, another designer based in The Netherlands, manufactured twelve suspended roller coasters and American designer Setpoint manufactured four.

== Installations ==
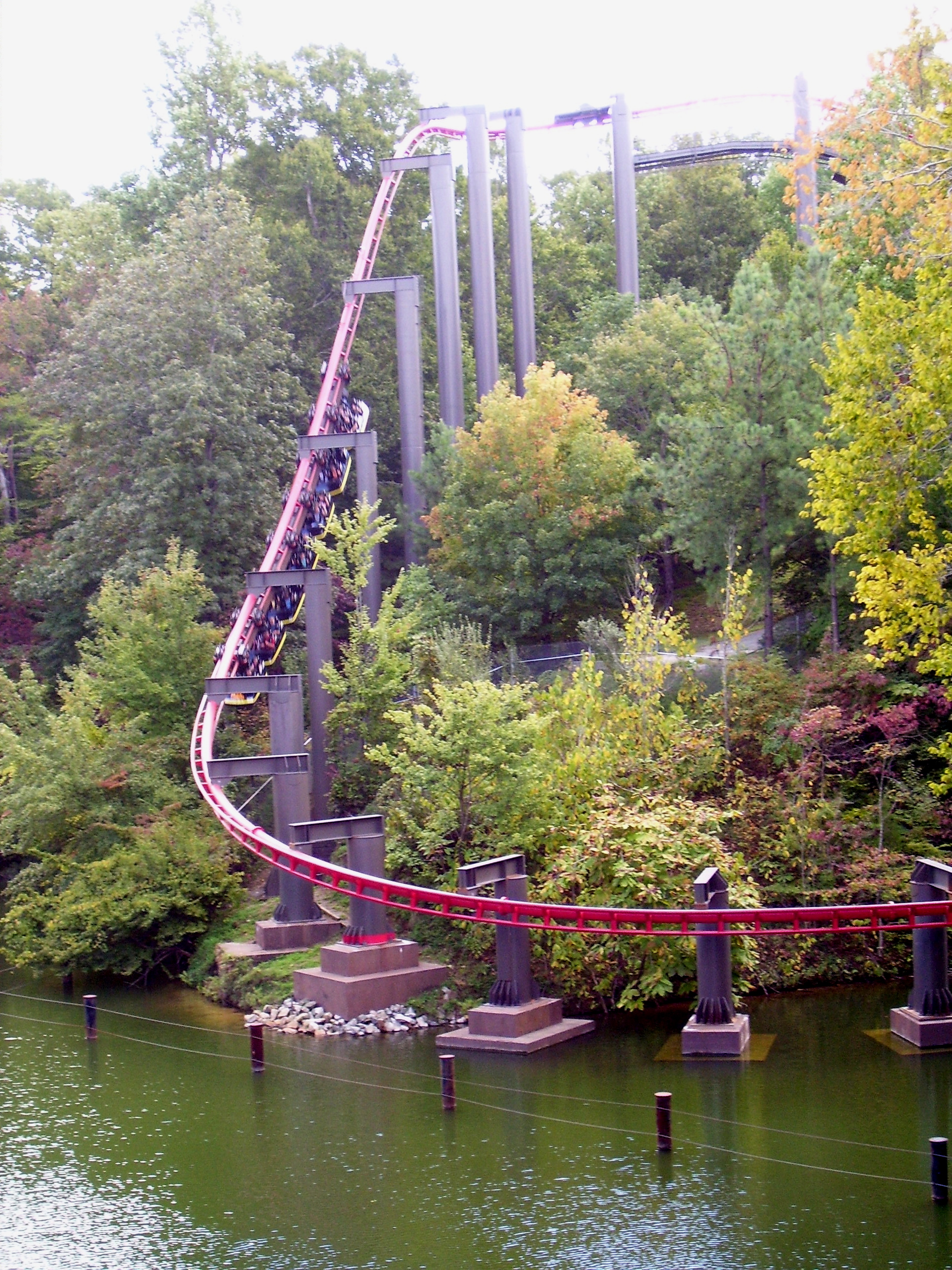
A former Arrow Huss suspended roller coaster, Big Bad Wolf at Busch Gardens Williamsburg

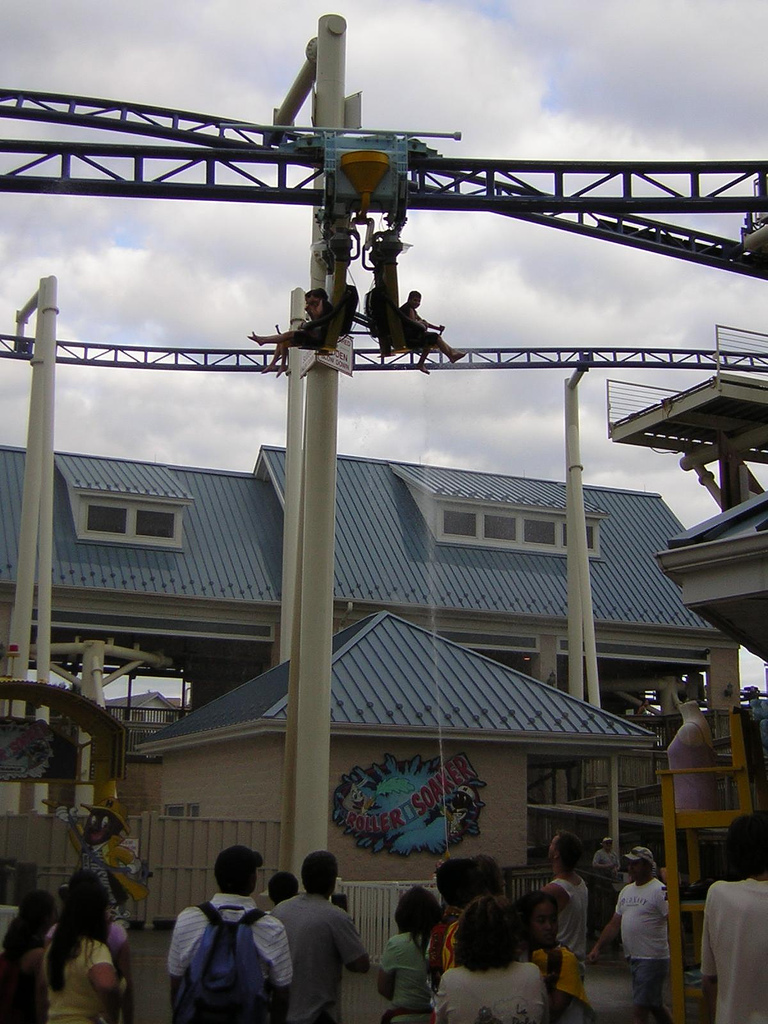
A Setpoint suspended roller coaster, Roller Soaker at Hershey Park

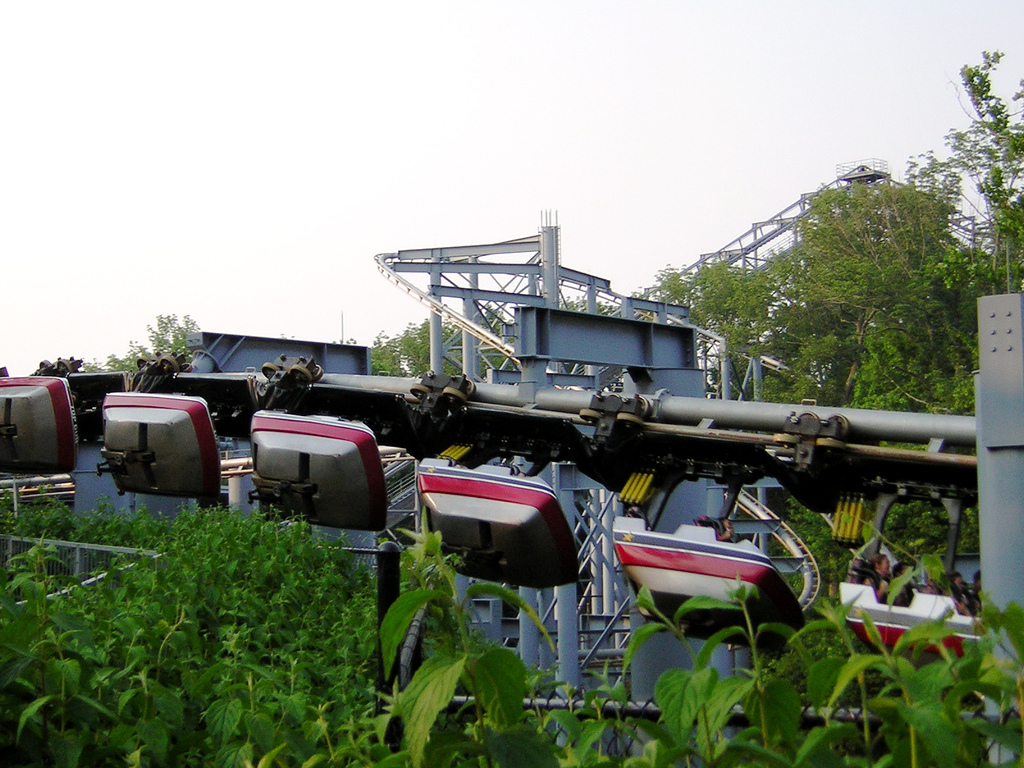
Trains swinging on an Arrow Dynamics manufactured suspended roller coaster The Bat at Kings Island

Name	Park	Manufacturer	Open	Status
Aerial Glide	Shipley Glen Pleasure Grounds		1900s	Removed
Bisby's Spiral Airship	Queens Park		1910	Removed
Aerial Coaster	Riverview Park	Aerial Tramway Construction Co.	1908	Removed
Wolkenkrabber	travelling (Eindhoven)	Keluto N.V.	1949	Removed
Alpenflug	Oktoberfest (Munich)	Messerschmitt	1975	Removed
The Bat	Kings Island	Arrow Development	1981	Removed
Big Bad Wolf	Busch Gardens Williamsburg	Arrow Huss	1984	Removed
XLR-8	Six Flags AstroWorld	Arrow Huss	1984	Removed
Iron Dragon	Cedar Point	Arrow Dynamics	1987	Operating
Dream Catcher	Bobbejaanland	Vekoma	1987	Operating
Ninja	Six Flags Magic Mountain	Arrow Dynamics	1988	Operating
Vampire*	Chessington World of Adventures	Arrow Dynamics	1990	Operating
Vortex	Canada's Wonderland	Arrow Dynamics	1991	Operating
Eagle Fortress	Everland	Arrow Dynamics	1992	Removed
Hayabusa	Tokyo SummerLand	Arrow Dynamics	1992	Removed
The Bat	Kings Island	Arrow Dynamics	1993	Operating
Sky Coaster; Formerly Centrifuge	Dream World; World Expo Park	Vekoma	1994; 1988	Operating
Batflyer	Lightwater Valley	Caripro	1996	Removed
Batflyer**	Duinrell	Caripro	1997	Removed
Scooby's Ghoster Coaster	Kings Island	Caripro	1998	Removed
Clone Zone	Milky Way	Caripro	1997	Operating
Pteranodon Flyers	Islands of Adventure	Caripro/Setpoint	1999	Operating
Flying Super Saturator	Carowinds	Setpoint	2000	Removed
Spellbreaker	Legoland California	Caripro	2000	Removed
Hydra Fighter II	Wet 'n Wild Emerald Pointe	Caripro	2001	Removed
Boramae Coaser	Wonder Zone	R&C Entertainment	2001	Removed
Sky Rider	Skyline Park	Caripro	2001	Operating
Batflyer	Nasu Highland Park	Caripro	2001	Operating
Roller Soaker	Hersheypark	Setpoint	2002	Removed
Aeroplanes	Aerocity Parc	Big Country Motioneering	2003	Removed
Batflyer	World In Miniature	Caripro	2003	Removed
Unknown	Dreamland Park		2006	Operating
Vertigo	Walibi Belgium	Input	2007	Removed
Padrinos Voladores	Parque de Atracciones de Madrid	Zamperla	2007	Operating
Slippery When Wet	Hard Rock Park	Caripro	2008	Removed
Canopy Flyer	Universal Studios Singapore	Setpoint	2010	Operating
Zooom!	Flamingo Land Resort	Zamperla	2011	Operating
Çelik Kartal**	Wonderland Eurasia	Zamperla	2019	SBNO
Télégraphe	Méga Parc	Extreme Engineering	2019	Operating
Bat Glider; Formerly Batflyer	Trans Studio Cibubur; Hamanako Pal Pal	Caripro	2019; 2001-2015	Operating
Bat Glider; Formerly Vleermuis	Trans Studio Bali; Plopsaland De Panne	Caripro	2019; 2000-2018	Operating
Eagle Wingspan	VinWonders Phú Quốc	Extreme Engineering	2020	Operating
Hummel Brummel	Schwaben Park	Wiegand	2020	Operating
Fly With Flap	Doha Quest	Extreme Engineering	2021	Operating
Samba Gliders	Genting SkyWorlds	Setpoint	2022	Operating

* Operates with Vekoma trains
** Never operated

== See also ==
- Suspension railway, a similar design used in public transport applications
