= Eagle Fortress =

1992–2009 roller coaster in South Korea

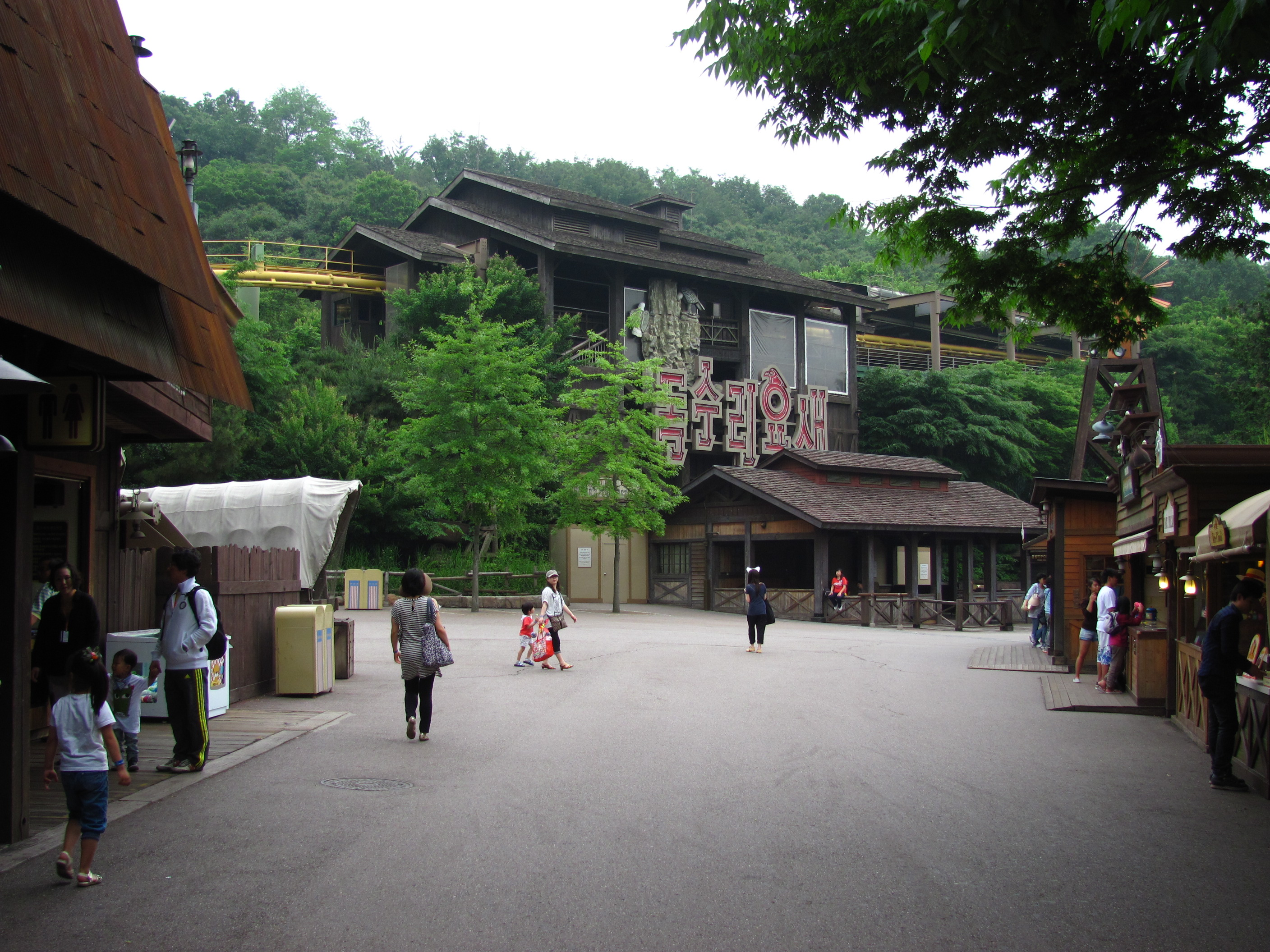

Everland
- Coordinates: 37°17′41″N 127°12′02″E
- Status: Removed
- Opening date: September 8, 1992
- Closing date: January 2009

Korean name
- Hangul: 독수리 요새
- Hanja: 禿수리 要塞
- RR: Doksuri yosae
- MR: Toksuri yosae

General statistics
- Type: Steel – Suspended
- Manufacturer: Arrow Dynamics
- Model: Suspended Coaster
- Track layout: Terrain
- Lift/launch system: Chain Lift Hill
- Length: 975.4 m (3,200 ft)
- Speed: 64.4 km/h (40.0 mph)
- Inversions: 0
- Duration: 1:58
- Trains: 2 trains with 7 cars. Riders are arranged 2 across in 2 rows for a total of 28 riders per train.
- Eagle Fortress at RCDB

Eagle Fortress (Korean: 독수리 요새) was a steel suspended roller coaster at Everland, South Korea, and was the first suspended roller coaster in Asia. It opened on 8 September 1992 and closed permanently in January 2009. Built by American manufacturer Arrow Dynamics, it was one of the last rides of its kind built by the company before going bankrupt in 2002 and was the longest suspended coaster built by Arrow Dynamics with a 3,200 ft long track.
