= Vampire (roller coaster) =

British roller coaster at Chessington World of Adventures

- Previously known as The Vampire (1990 - 1998)

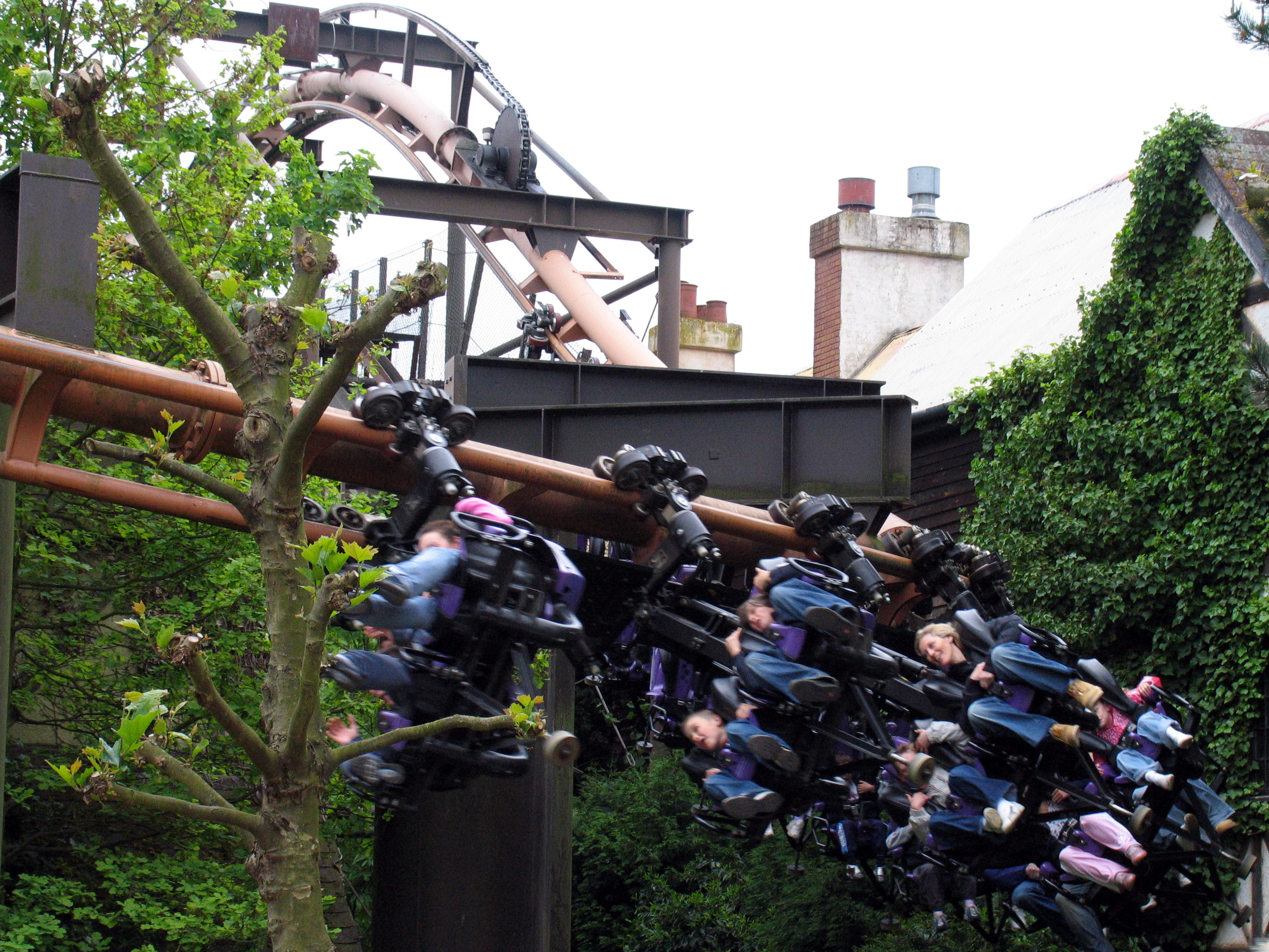
- Vampire's second lift hill and drop

Chessington World of Adventures
- Location: Chessington World of Adventures
- Park section: Wild Woods
- Coordinates: 51.347279°N 0.315607°W
- Status: Operating
- Opening date: 11 April 1990
- Cost: £5 million

General statistics
- Type: Steel – Suspended
- Manufacturer: Arrow Dynamics
- Model: Suspended Coaster
- Lift/launch system: Chain lift (x2)
- Height: 70 ft (21 m)
- Length: 2,200 ft (670 m)
- Speed: 45 mph (72 km/h)
- Inversions: 0
- Duration: 2:30
- Capacity: 720 riders per hour
- Height restriction: 43.3 in (110 cm)
- Trains: 2 trains with 12 cars; riders arranged 2 across in a single row for a total of 24 riders per train
- Theme: Gothic
- Slogan: "Sit back, hold on tight, the Vampire is taking flight!"
- Fastrack available
- Wheelchair accessible
- Must transfer from wheelchair
- Vampire at RCDB

Vampire (originally named The Vampire) is a steel suspended roller coaster located at Chessington World of Adventures Resort in Chessington, Greater London, England. Opened in 1990, it is one of only a few remaining Arrow Dynamics suspended swinging coasters in operation globally, and is the only Arrow Dynamics suspended roller coaster still operating outside of North America.

The roller coaster features trains that hang beneath the track, swinging freely as they navigate the course. The roller coaster includes two lift hills and is characterised by numerous dives and turns. The layout was drafted by John Wardley.

In 2001, The Vampire underwent modifications to accommodate new trains manufactured by Vekoma. The updated coaster reopened to the public in 2002.

== History ==
=== Theme ===
The original Arrow trains were themed as bats. When the ride first opened, its queue-line was entered through themed castle gates and led to a fog-filled underpass beneath the coaster track, into a with tombs and into a dark interior passageway with various scenery.

The station is dressed as a castle ballroom with flaming chandeliers, Gothic murals and an animatronic organist playing a large pipe organ.

The original theme music in the station was composed and produced by Graham Smart in the style of an organ overture with a Gothic rock sound, alluding to Phantom of the Opera. In 2020, for the ride's 30th anniversary, the music was replaced with a new track.

Towards the end of the ride, the coaster takes a sudden drop into a tunnel, which was originally slightly longer and darker, however it was altered to accommodate the larger, floorless trains from 2002.

=== 2002 Refurbishment ===
The ride was closed throughout the 2001 season to be refurbished by Vekoma, including replacing the trains with a new suspended model. The ride's original manufacturer, Arrow Dynamics, went bankrupt by the end of 2001, with Vekoma allowing for its continued maintenance.

== Ride experience ==
Guests begin by entering the queue, which is adorned with numerous gothic-themed elements. The ride's station is designed to resemble a gothic ballroom, where riders board the vehicles.

Upon dispatch, the train begins its ascent up the first of two chain lift hills. Once reaching the peak, the train disengages from the chain, and gravity takes over as it navigates a series of helixes and turns through a dense forest.

After losing momentum, the train ascends a second lift hill. It then continues through more banked turns and twists, soaring through the forest canopy. The coaster reaches its most intense moment as the train dives toward the ground, passes through a tunnel, and executes a sharp right turn to exit the tunnel.

The train then makes its way back to the station, featuring low-to-the-ground twists, before finally entering the brake run and returning to the station.

== Gallery ==
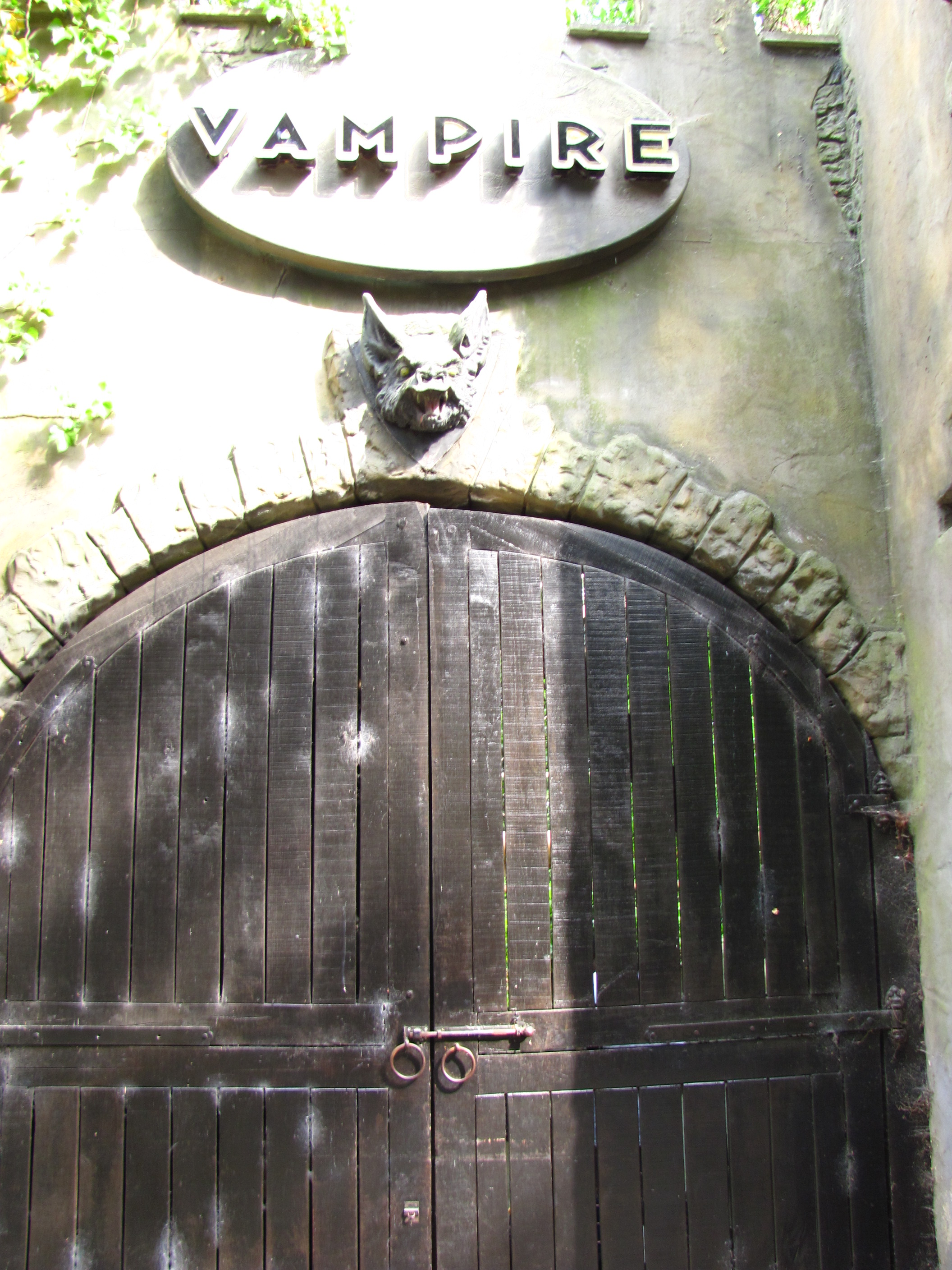
Former ride entrance, also previously used as a Fastrack entrance.

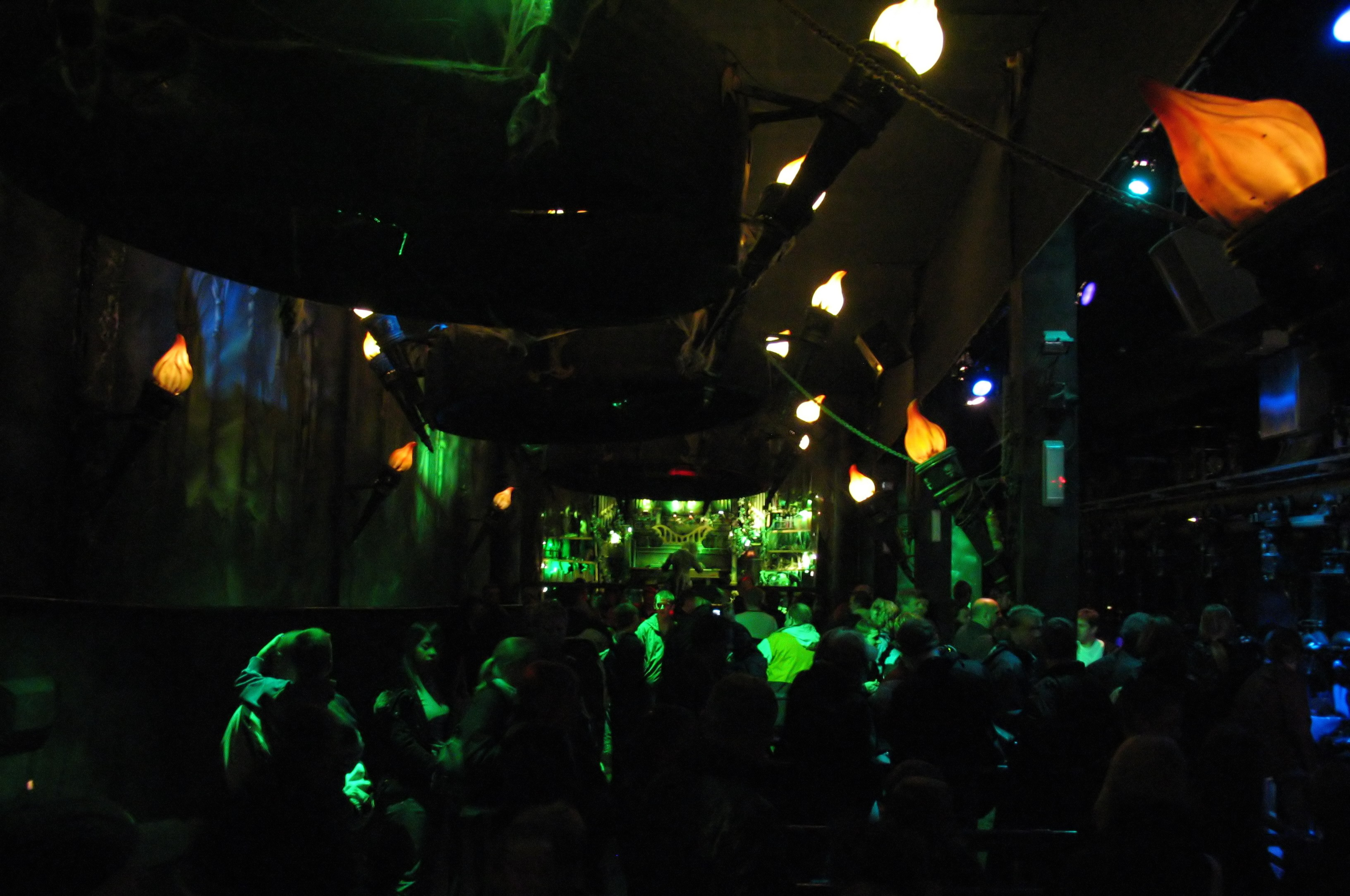
Ride station, themed as an abbey, with an organ in the far back

Animatronic organ player

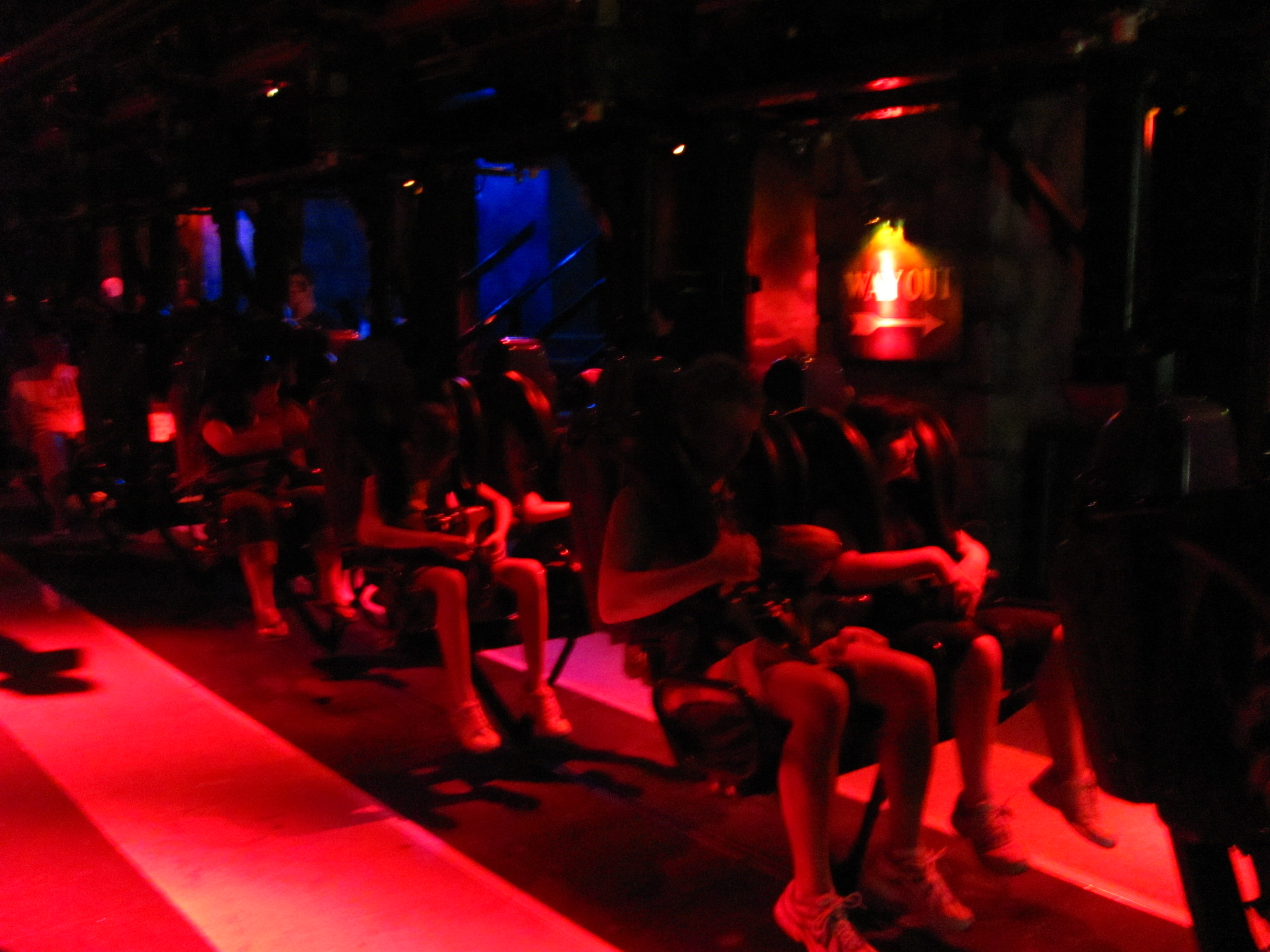
Riders in sitting position

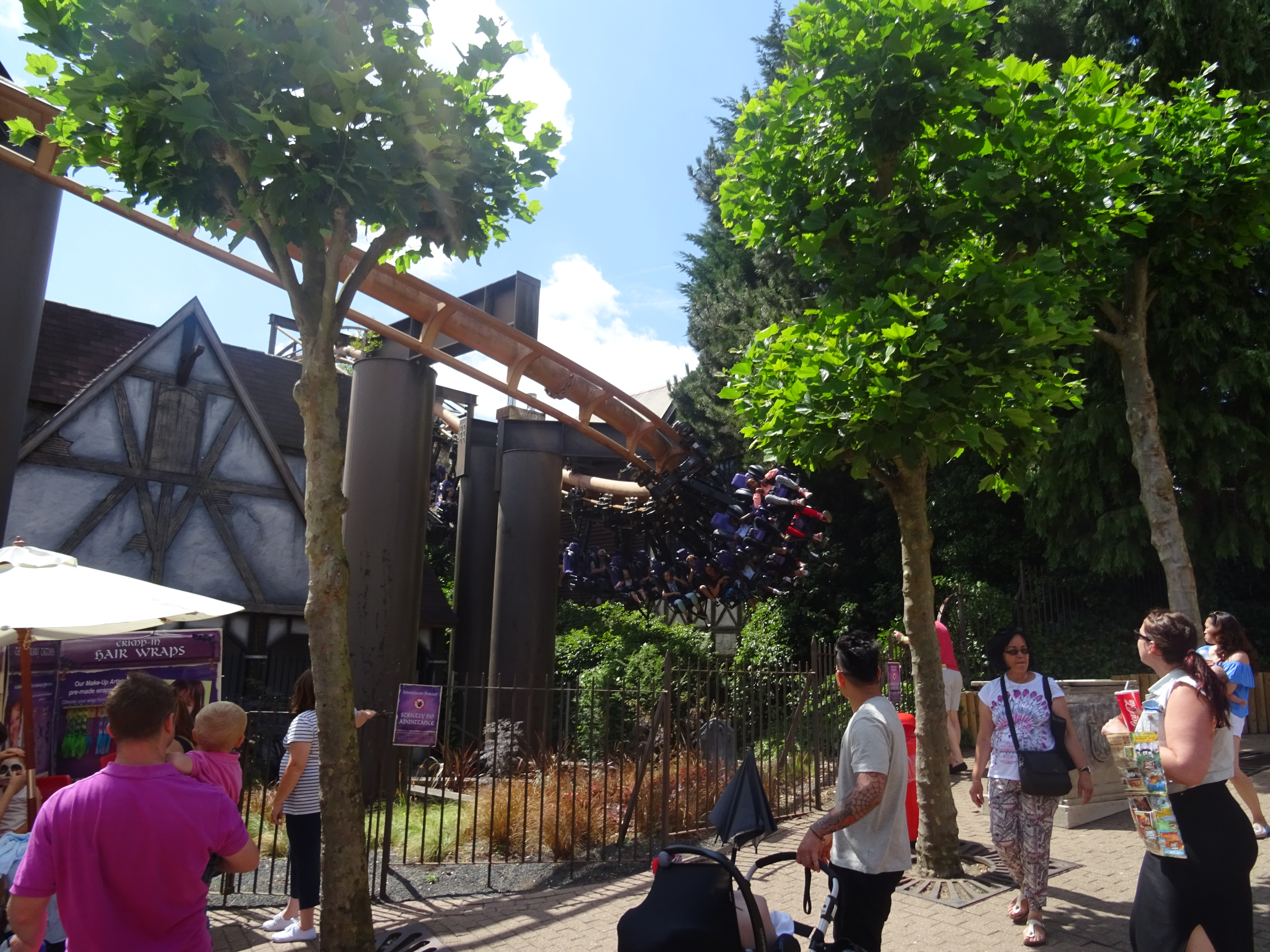
Helix after lift two

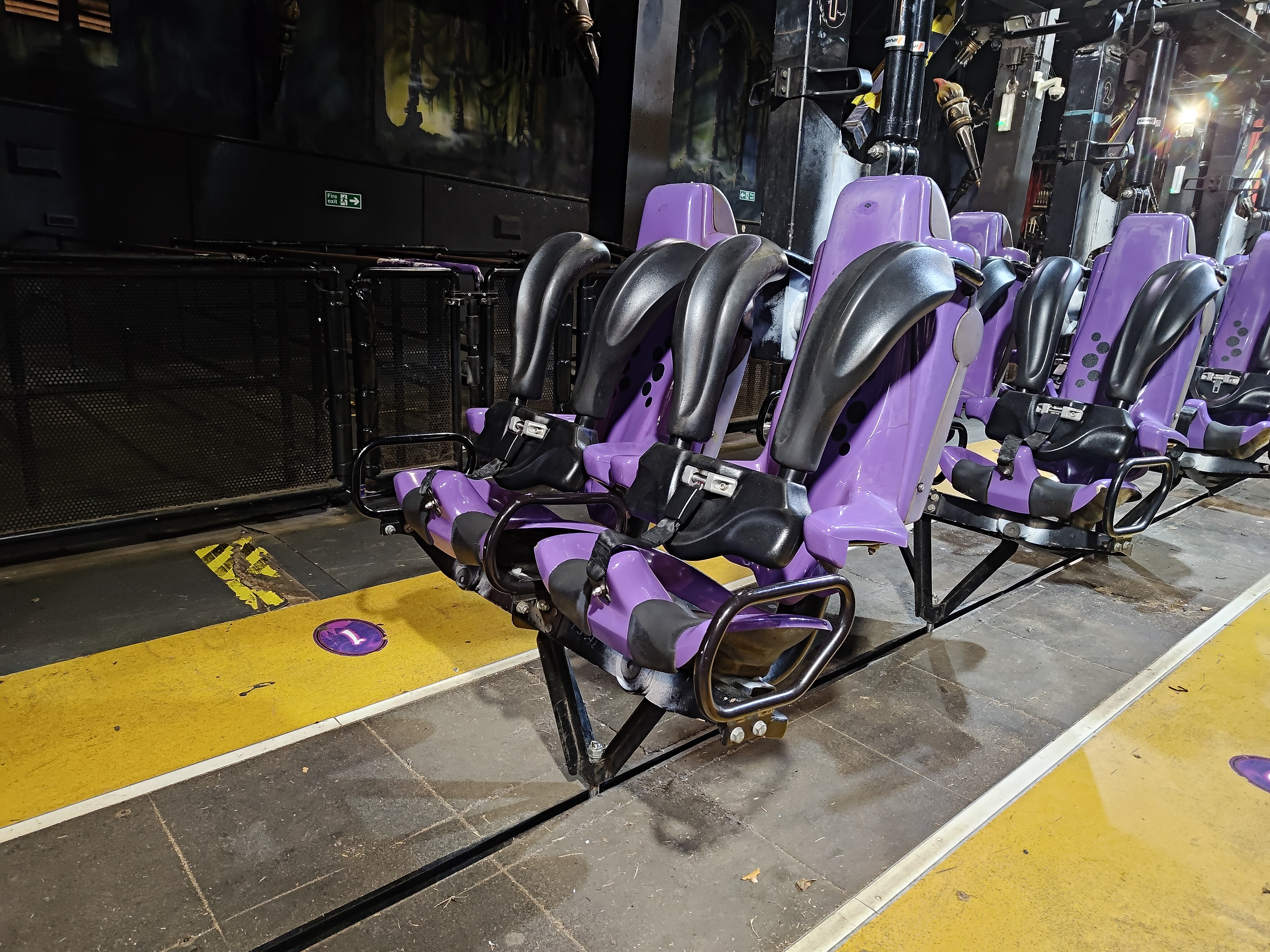
Vekoma Train

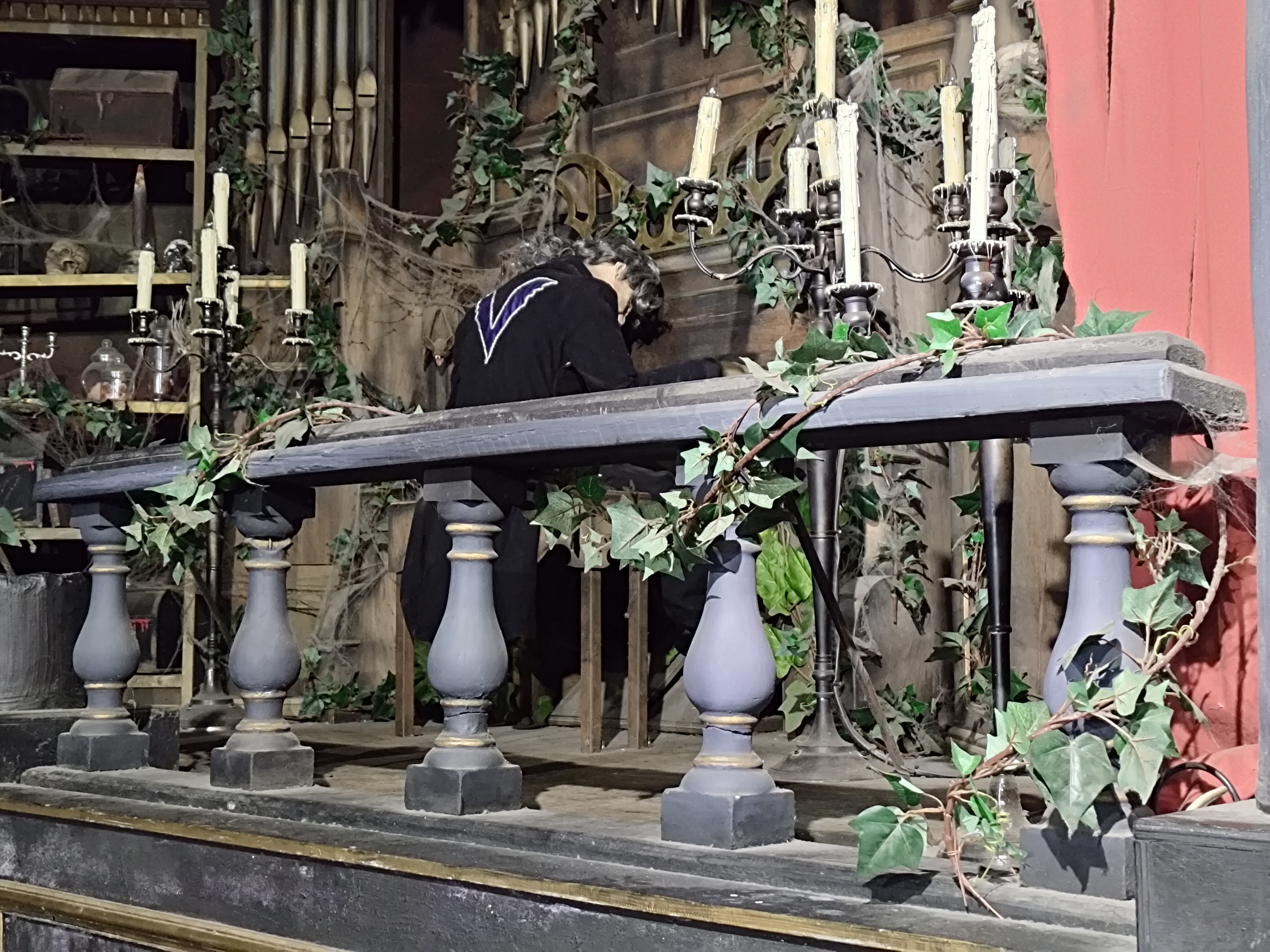
Marcel animatronic at the organ

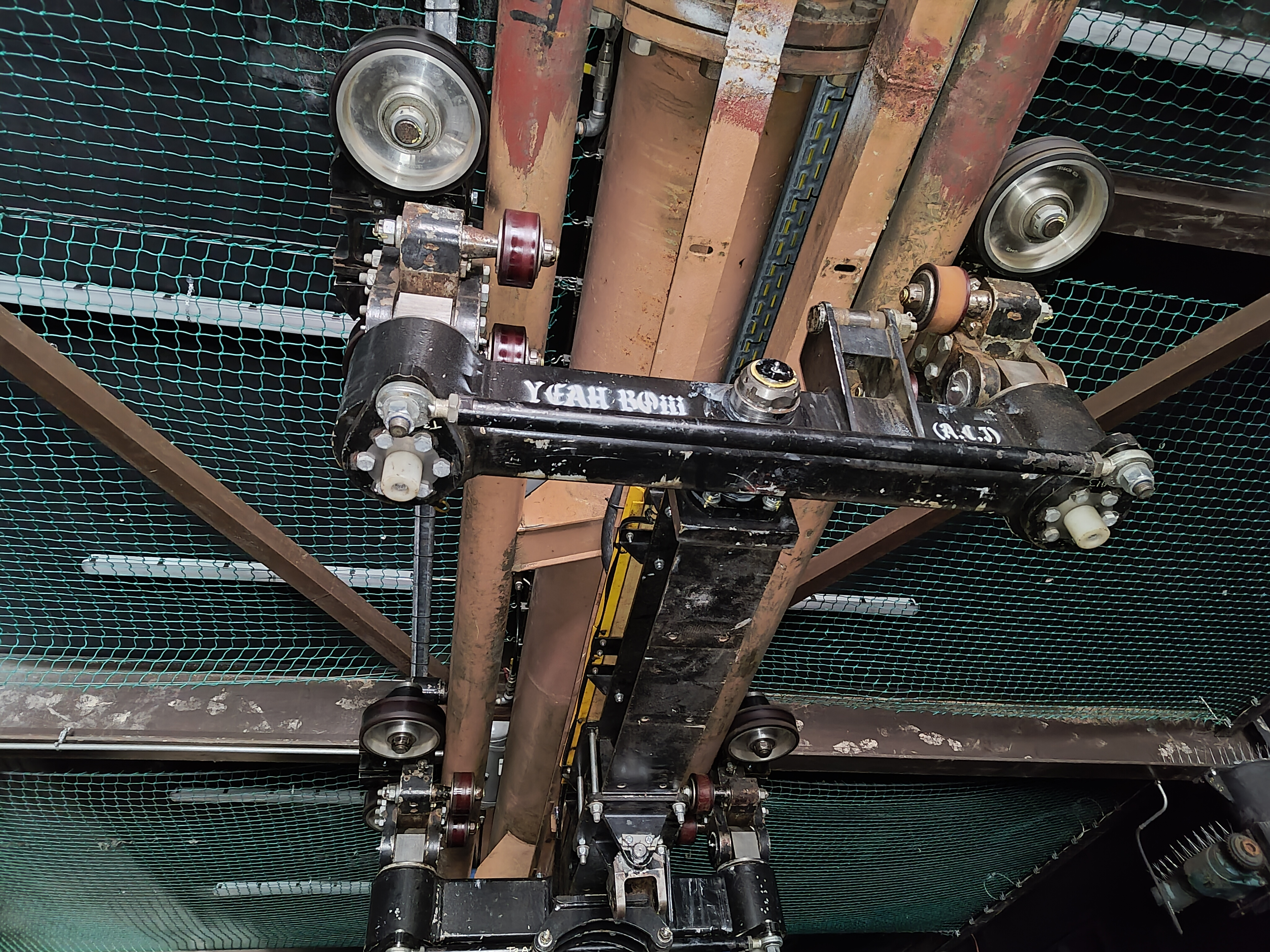
Vampire rear wheel assembly - in 2025, for the ride's 35th anniversary, the park held an auction to write a message on the train. The winner chose "Yeah Boii".

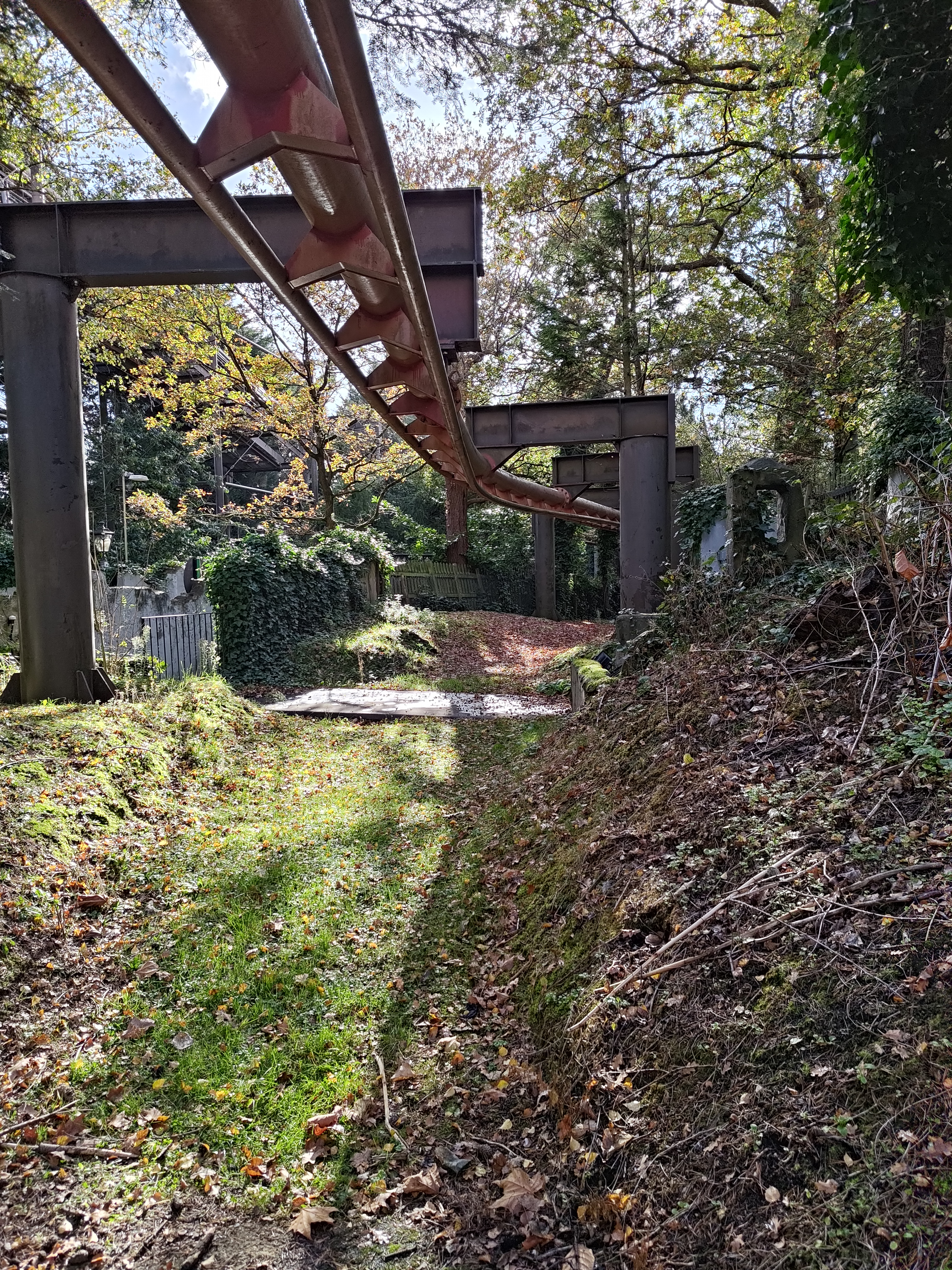
Final stretch of track leading into the brake run, taken from inside the ride building

== See also ==
- Chessington World of Adventures Resort
