= The Bat (Kings Island; opened 1993) =

Suspended roller coaster at Kings Island

- Previously known as Top Gun (1993–2007) and Flight Deck (2008–2013)

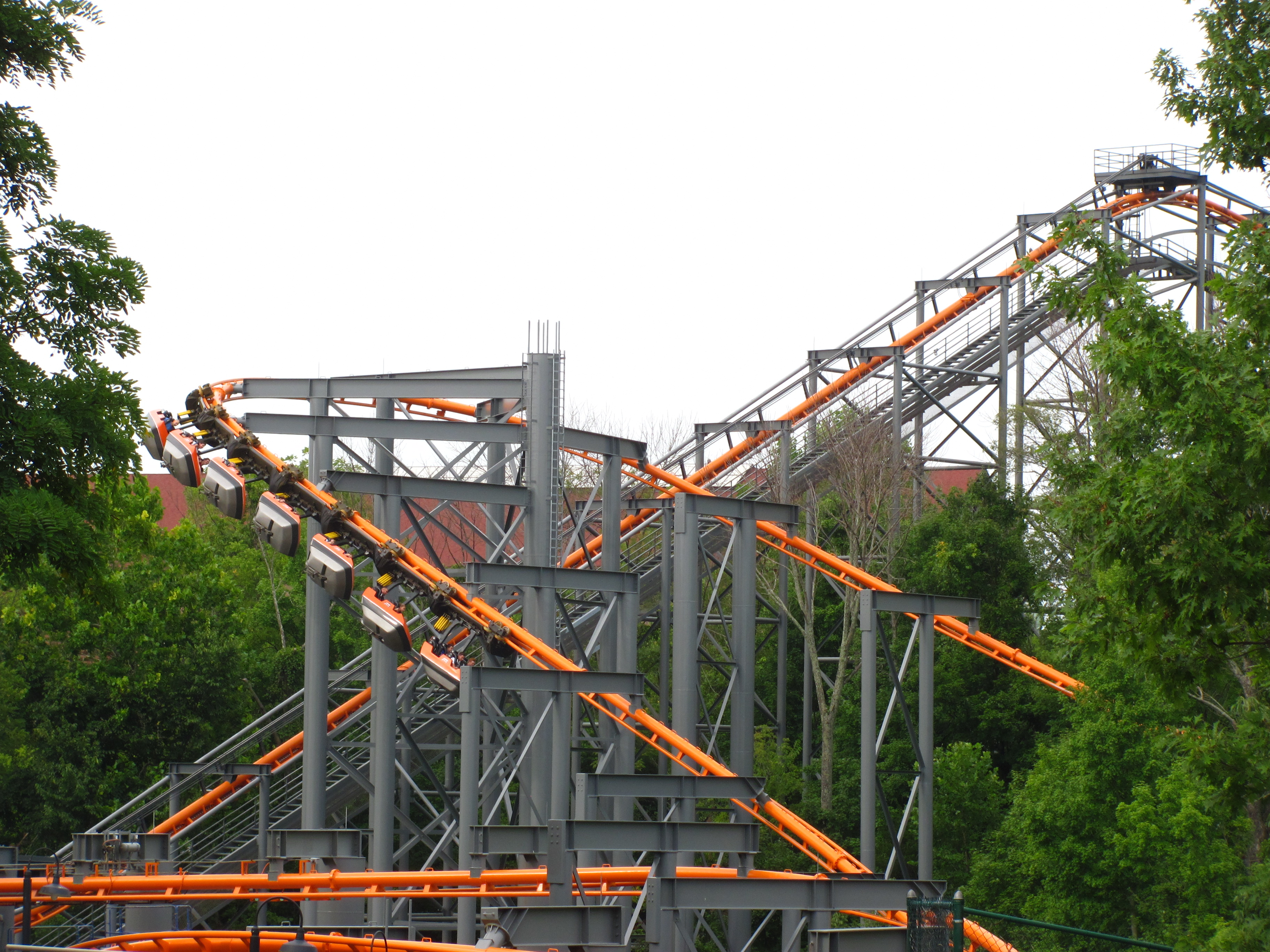

Kings Island
- Location: Kings Island
- Park section: Action Zone
- Coordinates: 39.3476°N 84.2652°W
- Status: Operating
- Opening date: April 9, 1993

General statistics
- Type: Steel – Suspended
- Manufacturer: Arrow Dynamics
- Model: Suspended Coaster
- Track layout: Terrain
- Lift/launch system: Chain lift hill
- Height: 78 ft (24 m)
- Drop: 70 ft (21 m)
- Length: 2,352 ft (717 m)
- Speed: 51 mph (82 km/h)
- Inversions: 0
- Duration: 1:52
- Max vertical angle: 45°
- Capacity: 1,200 riders per hour
- G-force: 2.9
- Height restriction: 42 in (107 cm)
- Trains: 2 trains with 7 cars. Riders are arranged 2 across in 2 rows for a total of 28 riders per train.
- The Bat at RCDB

The Bat is a suspended roller coaster located at Kings Island in Mason, Ohio, United States. Built by Arrow Dynamics, the roller coaster originally opened as Top Gun in 1993, themed to the 1986 film Top Gun. It is the second suspended coaster to open at the park following an earlier prototype from Arrow Development — also called The Bat – that briefly operated at Kings Island from 1981 to 1983.

Following Cedar Fair's purchase of the park in 2006, the ride was eventually renamed Flight Deck for the 2008 season. In 2014, it was renamed again to The Bat to pay homage to the original Arrow suspended coaster that opened in 1981. As with other suspended coasters, the layout is designed to give riders the illusion they are narrowly missing track supports and other elements while swinging freely through sharp turns.

== History ==
The 660-short-ton (600 t) structure was planned years in advance, long before Paramount Communications purchased the park in 1992. However, Paramount assumed control over operations in time to determine the ride's theme, which the company decided would be based on its 1986 film Top Gun. The official announcement was released to the public on November 11, 1992, detailing that the ride would be an Arrow Dynamics suspended coaster, similar to The Bat which had operated at the park in the 1980s.

Construction began in December 1992 and was completed by spring of 1993. The park hired John DeCuir Jr., a production designer who worked on the film, to design the ride's loading platform. He was tasked with having it resemble the deck of an aircraft carrier. Top Gun opened on April 9, 1993.

Cedar Fair purchased Kings Island in 2006, and in 2008, decided to rename the ride Flight Deck. All references to the film, including theme music playing in the queue and signage, were modified or removed. Cedar Fair had rights to continue using Paramount themes throughout the park for years to come, but they decided to make the transition sooner and begin removing them in 2008. On the 33rd anniversary of The Bat, which operated at Kings Island from 1981 to 1983, the park announced that Flight Deck would take on the same name as the historical Arrow ride and be renamed The Bat for the 2014 season. The ride was repainted a new orange color scheme with charcoal supports and black trains.

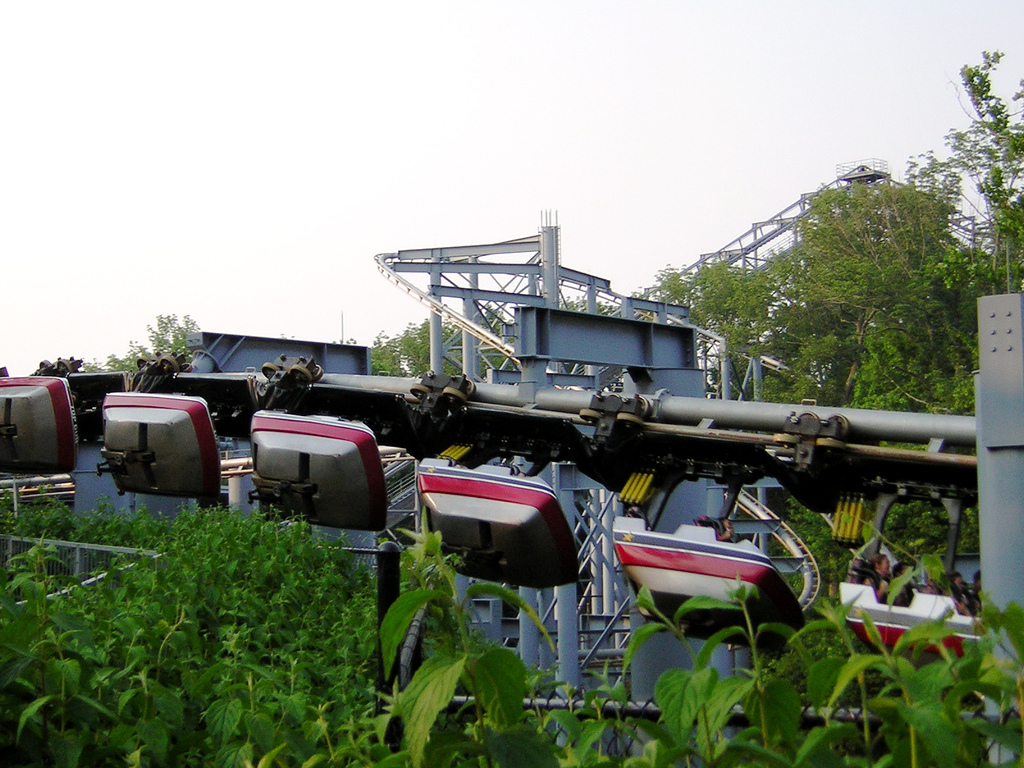
Photo depicting the old Top Gun color scheme in 2005

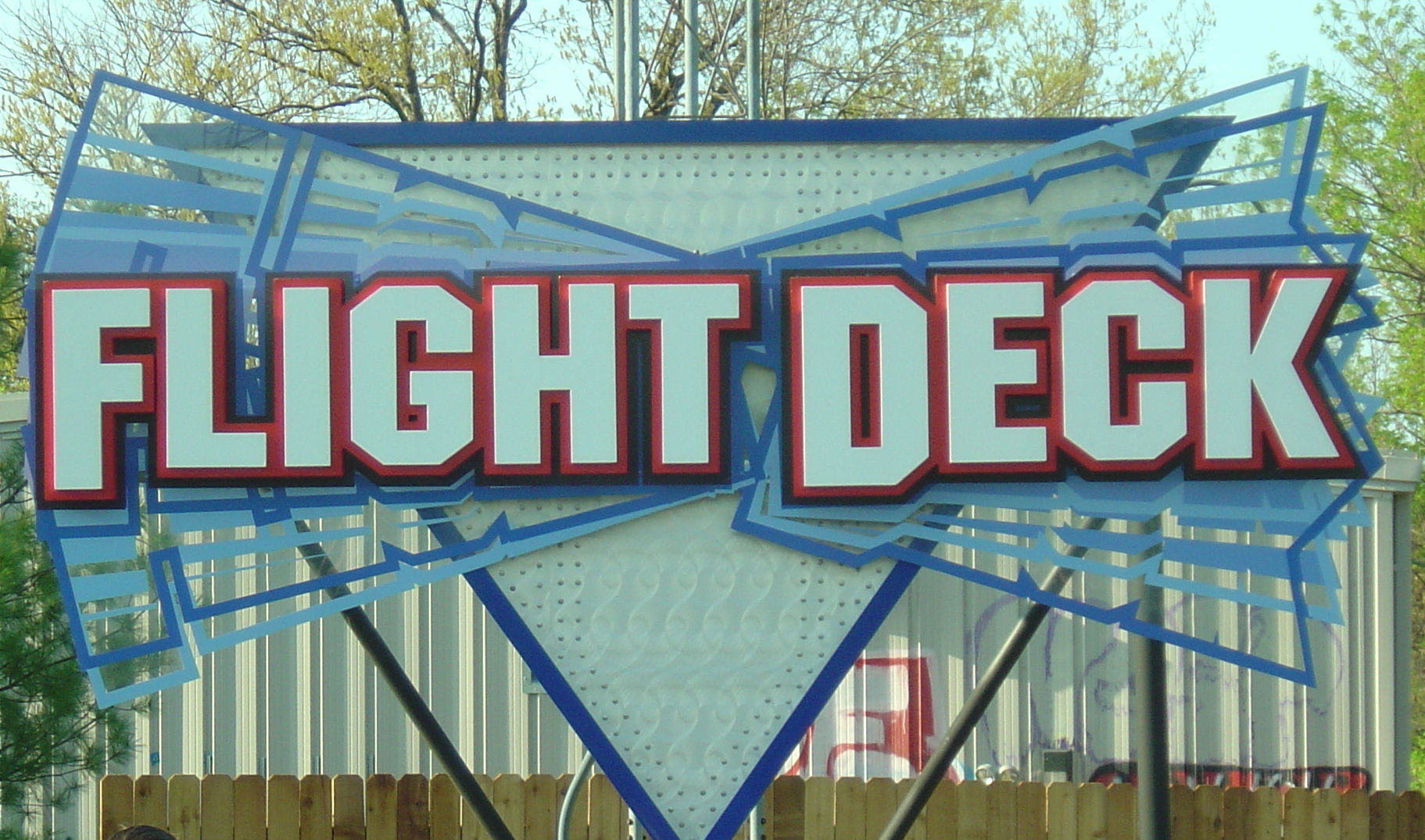
Entrance sign in 2009 following the name change to Flight Deck

== Ride experience ==
=== Queue ===
The Bat's official logo is displayed at the entrance to the ride queue, and the queue of the defunct Son of Beast can be seen to the left. The pathway has many turns and curves, and guests will eventually reach an underpass. A staircase at the end leads into the station.

When the ride opened as Top Gun, guests walked through an exhibit depicting an aircraft carrier control room prior to reaching the staircase. Access to the control room exhibit was blocked off from the queue several years later, some time before Cedar Fair (now Six Flags) purchased the park in 2006. Music from the motion picture, which originally played throughout the queue, was also removed during the theme transition to Flight Deck.

=== Layout ===
The ride begins with an ascent up a 90-foot (27 m) chain lift. At the top, the train dips slightly and turns roughly 225 degrees to the right. The train then drops 70 feet (21 m) into a valley banking right at the bottom as it begins to climb into the horseshoe element. The cars swing up and around to the left exiting the horseshoe parallel to same position during entry. Dropping back into the same valley, the train makes another banked turn to the right followed by a slight turn to the left as it passes by the observation area located near the exit.

The last part of the ride takes riders through a final series of sharp turns, each sending the train swinging quickly from one side to the other. At the ride's farthest point from the initial drop, the track makes its sharpest turn sending the train back toward the loading station. Afterward, the train navigates two more inclining turns before stopping abruptly at the brake run. The sudden brake right out of the last turn causes the cars to swing briefly even after the train has stopped moving forward.

The Bat has a similar layout to the Vortex at Canada's Wonderland, which was built two years earlier. The Vortex, however, has one less car on each train and excels in height, speed, and track length.

== Incident ==
On June 22, 2022, one of the wheels on a moving train carrying passengers came loose. No passengers were injured, and they were able to safely exit the ride. The Bat was closed for repairs following the incident, and it reopened several weeks later.
