= Vortex (Kings Island) =

Defunct steel roller coaster

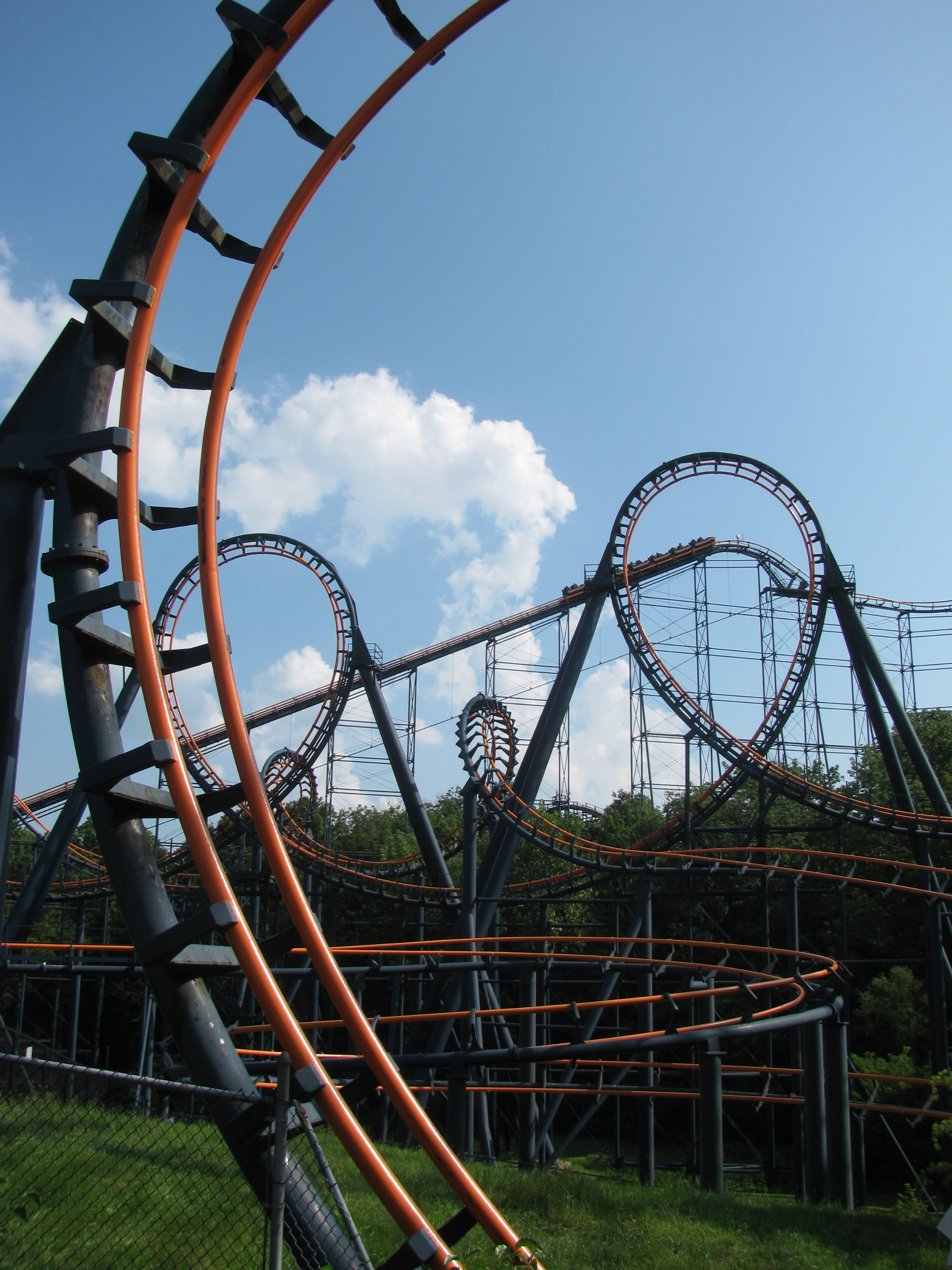

Kings Island
- Location: Kings Island
- Park section: Coney Mall
- Coordinates: 39.34072°N 84.2642°W
- Status: Removed
- Opening date: April 11, 1987
- Closing date: October 27, 2019
- Cost: $4 million
- Replaced: The Bat

General statistics
- Type: Steel
- Manufacturer: Arrow Dynamics
- Model: Custom Looping Coaster
- Lift/launch system: Chain lift hill
- Height: 148 ft (45 m)
- Drop: 138 ft (42 m)
- Length: 3,800 ft (1,200 m)
- Speed: 55 mph (89 km/h)
- Inversions: 6
- Duration: 2:30
- Max vertical angle: 55°
- Capacity: 1600 riders per hour
- Height restriction: 48 in (122 cm)
- Trains: 3 trains with 7 cars. Riders are arranged 2 across in 2 rows for a total of 28 riders per train.
- Vortex at RCDB

Vortex was a steel roller coaster located at Kings Island amusement park in Mason, Ohio, United States. Designed and manufactured by Arrow Dynamics at a cost of $4 million, the ride officially opened to the public on April 11, 1987. Vortex debuted as the tallest full-circuit roller coaster in the world with a height of 148 feet (45 m). It was also the first coaster to feature six inversions.

Vortex occupied the same location in the park once held by The Bat, the world's first suspended roller coaster. Tied to the coaster's debut, attendance at Kings Island exceeded 3 million in 1987 for the first time. It accommodated more than 46 million guests throughout its lifespan, making Vortex one of the most frequently-ridden attractions in park history. The ride permanently closed on October 27, 2019.

== History ==
On May 30, 1986, Kings Island announced that they would be adding a new roller coaster for the 1987 season. For the design and construction of the attraction, Kings Island turned to Arrow Dynamics, an industry-leading manufacturer at the time. It would sit in the former location of The Bat, the world's first suspended roller coaster, which was removed after the 1984 season. The defunct coaster's line queue and train station were retained and reused for the new ride.

Construction began in early June 1986 when The Bat's area was cleared. The following month, Kings Island announced that they would be naming the new coaster Vortex. The park invested over $4 million in the ride, which required 750 tons of steel to construct. It opened to the public on April 11, 1987, and helped the park exceed 3 million visitors for the first time in its history. At its inauguration, Vortex briefly set two world records among full-circuit roller coasters. It was the tallest at 148 feet (45 m) and featured the most inversions with six. Both were surpassed the following year with the debut of Shockwave at Six Flags Great America.

On September 27, 2019, the park announced plans to close Vortex permanently on October 27, 2019. Area Manager Don Helbig stated that the coaster had reached the end of its service life. Following its demolition, the trains were sent to sister park Carowinds for use on Carolina Cyclone. The bodies of the trains were sanded, repainted, and then combined with the chassis of Carolina Cyclone's old trains.

Kings Island later sold remnant souvenirs of Vortex that were sold in 1.5-inch slices, capped with metal plates and mounted in a display stand. During its lifespan, Vortex accommodated over 46 million riders, ranking it seventh in Kings Island's history as of 2019.

== Ride experience ==
=== Inversions ===
	Inversion
1	Vertical Loop
2	Vertical Loop
3	Corkscrew
4	Corkscrew
5	Part 1 of Batwing element
6	Part 2 of Batwing element

=== Layout ===
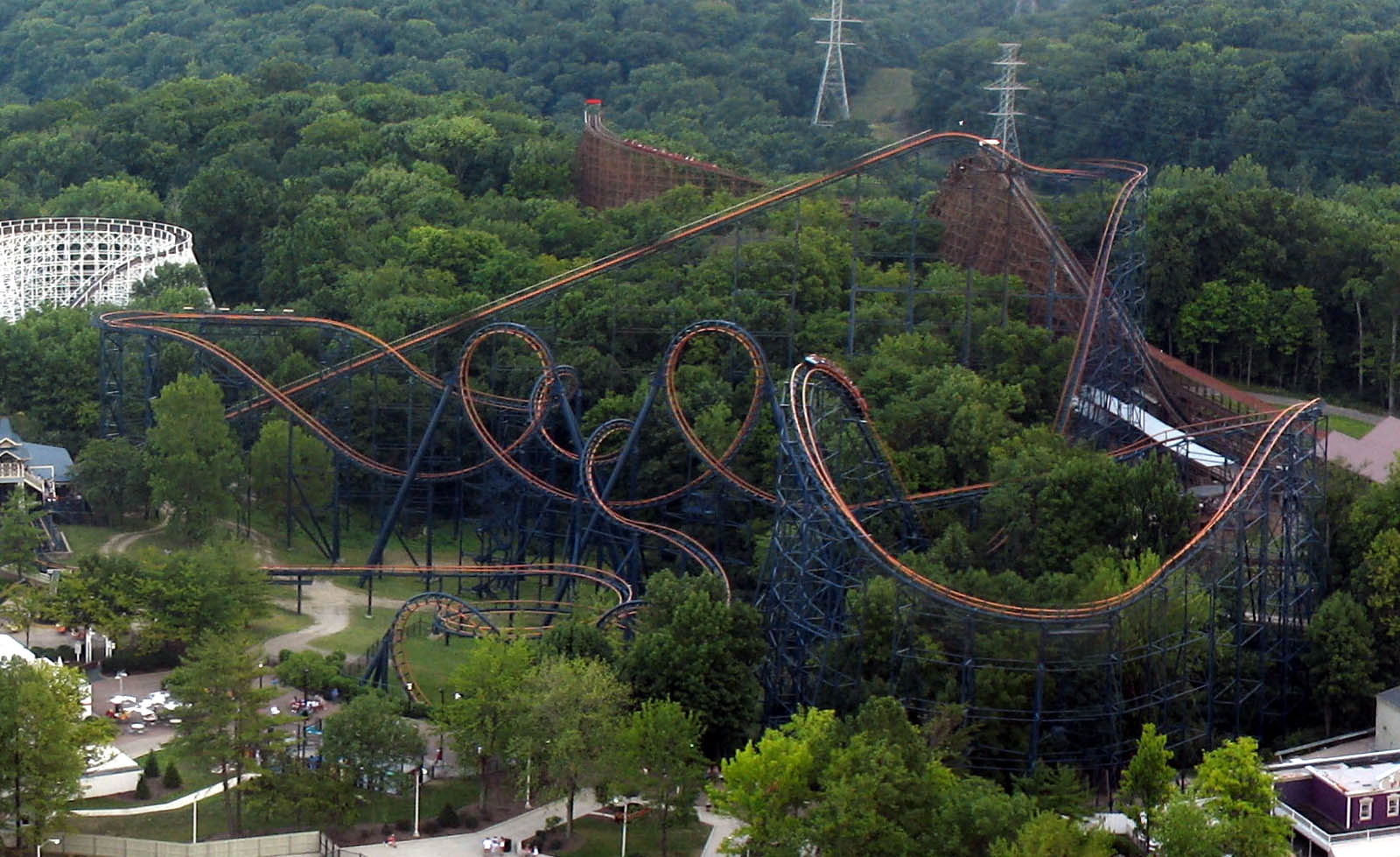
Aerial view of Vortex

After leaving the station, the train dipped slightly and turned right into the lift hill. Following a slow ascension to the top, the train dipped several feet into a tester hill, then immediately made a right-hand turn into the first drop. The 138-foot (42 m) drop was angled at 55 degrees, where the train would reach its maximum velocity of 55 mph (89 km/h). This was followed by an upward, slightly-banked turn to the left. After turning roughly 180 degrees, the track straightened briefly before descending into a sharp left turn that sent riders through two consecutive vertical loops.

Upon exiting the second loop, the train made a 180-degree ascending turn to the right into a mid-course brake run that nearly slowed the train to a complete stop. The train then dropped slightly into a pair of consecutive corkscrews, the second of which threaded through a gap between the previously-encountered vertical loops. This was followed by a downward right-hand turn into a boomerang element, inverting riders two additional times. An on-ride camera was located in the dip of the boomerang. The train then entered its final maneuver – a 450-degree ascending clockwise helix – which generated positive g forces. The final brake run immediately followed, and the train made a final right-hand turn as it returned to the station.

== Incidents ==
On July 2, 2011, a computer detected damage to Vortex's chain lift as a train was pulling out of the station. The ride was stopped and all passengers were able to safely exit. The ride remained closed for several weeks while a replacement part was on order.

Preceded by Viper	Most Inversions on a Roller Coaster; April 1987–June 1988	Succeeded by Shockwave
