= XLR-8 =

Defunct roller coaster

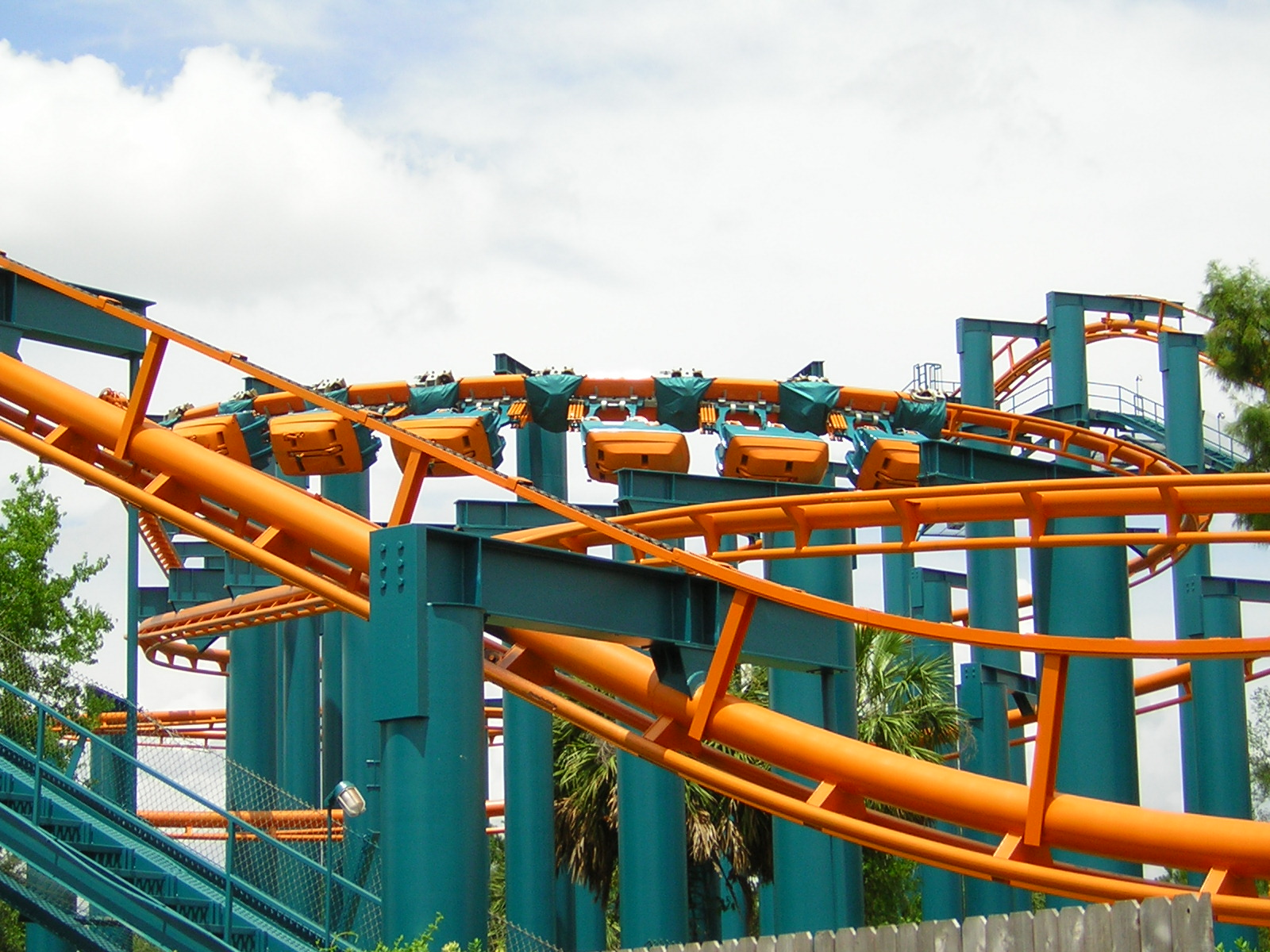
- XLR-8 in 2004 showing the different orientation of cars

Six Flags AstroWorld
- Location: Six Flags AstroWorld
- Coordinates: 29.674818°N 95.405643°W
- Status: Removed
- Opening date: May 12, 1984
- Closing date: October 30, 2005
- Cost: $3.2 million

General statistics
- Type: Steel – Suspended
- Manufacturer: Arrow Dynamics
- Model: Suspended Coaster
- Height: 81 ft (25 m)
- Length: 3,000 ft (910 m)
- Speed: 34.1 mph (54.9 km/h)
- Inversions: 0
- Duration: 3:00
- Height restriction: 42 in (107 cm)
- Trains: 2 trains with 7 cars; riders arranged 2 across in 2 rows for a total of 28 riders per train
- XLR-8 at RCDB

XLR-8 (pronounced "accelerate") was a suspended roller coaster located at the defunct Six Flags AstroWorld. Manufactured by Arrow Huss at a cost of $3.2 million, the ride opened to the public in 1984, where it operated until the park's closure in 2005. It was one of Arrow's first attempts at producing a successful suspended coaster following troubles with The Bat at Kings Island, which operated briefly from 1981 to 1983.

== History ==
=== Car reversal ===
For AstroWorld's Fright Fest 2002 event, the last four cars on XLR-8's trains were reversed, a first for a suspended roller coaster. The change proved popular and successful, and the trains remained reversed until the park's closure in 2005.

=== Closure ===
In September 2005, it was announced that AstroWorld would not reopen for the 2006 season. XLR-8 closed along with the rest of the park on October 30, 2005, and was later demolished. A portion of the trains were sent to Six Flags Magic Mountain for use on Ninja.

== See also ==
- History of the roller coaster
- Former Six Flags properties
