= Terrain roller coaster =

Type of rollercoaster

Terrain roller coasters are roller coasters which take advantage of the usually natural undulations of the land upon which they are built. Such rides may weave through forests, and some may dive down cliffs. Because they tend to stay close to the ground, they require fewer supports and thus can be cheaper to build than coasters on flat ground.

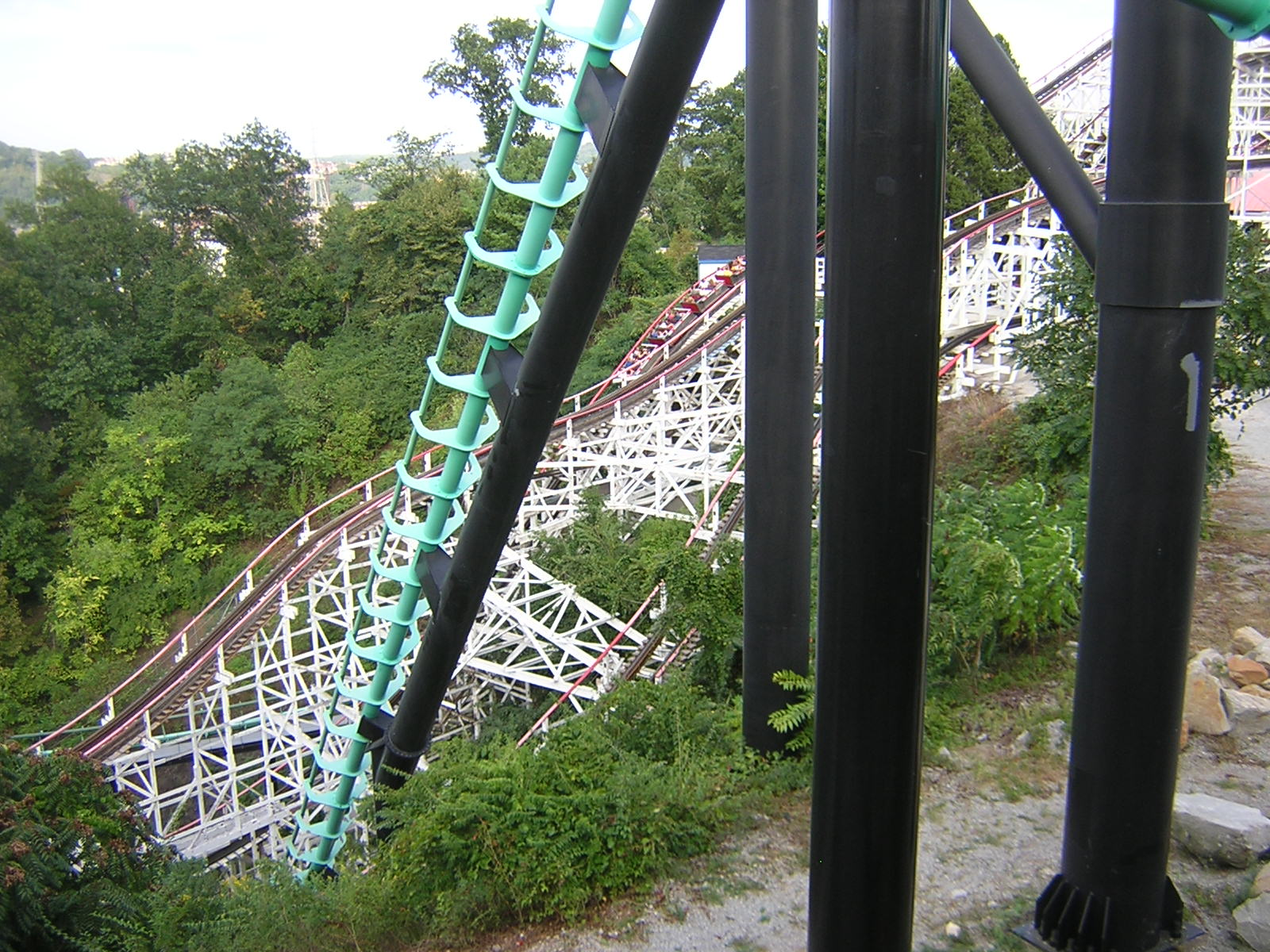
A view of Phantom's Revenge's second drop

== Examples ==
- Apollo's Chariot at Busch Gardens Williamsburg features a height of 170 feet (52 m) and a drop of 210 feet (64 m) into a ravine.
- Boulder Dash at Lake Compounce is an out-and-back coaster that traverses the side of a mountain.
- Kennywood is located within the hills of Pittsburgh. Many of its coasters take significant advantage of the topography, including Thunderbolt, Jack Rabbit, and Phantom's Revenge, all of which use the hills to their advantages to gain larger drop lengths.
- Ravine Flyer II at Waldameer was built in a ravine, and uses a cliffside to add an extra 35 feet (11 m) to its drop length.
- The Beast at Kings Island features over a mile of track almost entirely in a forest.
- The Voyage at Holiday World features a layout that weaves through a forest and into underground tunnels.
- The Ultimate at Lightwater Valley ran through a forest and over several hills.
