= Blue Streak (Cedar Point) =

Wooden roller coaster

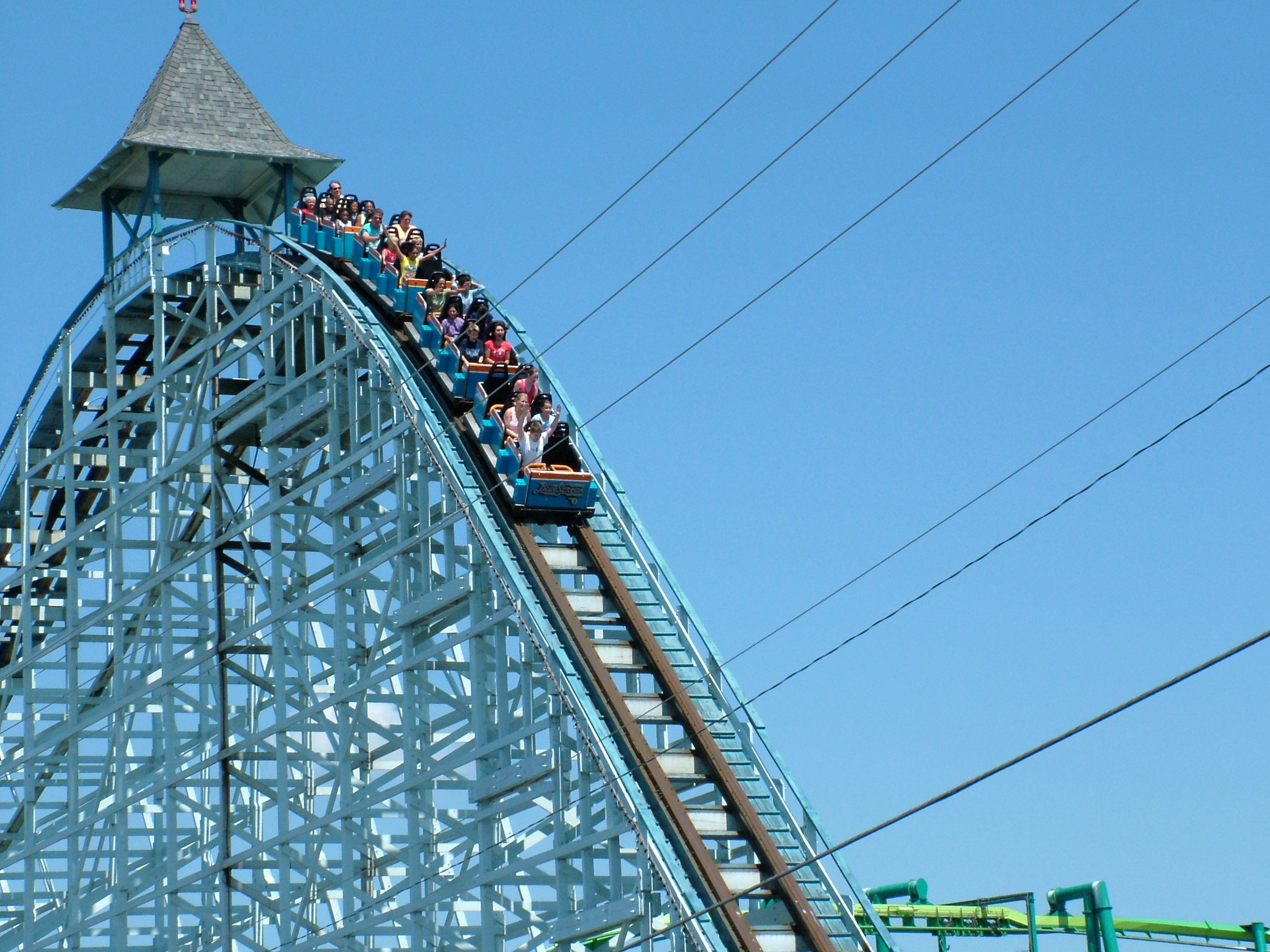
- Initial drop on Blue Streak

Cedar Point
- Location: Cedar Point
- Park section: Main Midway
- Coordinates: 41°28′47.50″N 82°40′57.50″W
- Status: Operating
- Opening date: May 23, 1964
- Cost: $200,000

General statistics
- Type: Wood
- Manufacturer: Philadelphia Toboggan Coasters
- Designer: Frank F. Hoover; John C. Allen
- Track layout: Out and Back
- Lift/launch system: Chain lift hill
- Height: 78 ft (24 m)
- Drop: 72 ft (22 m)
- Length: 2,558 ft (780 m)
- Speed: 40 mph (64 km/h)
- Inversions: 0
- Duration: 1:45
- Max vertical angle: 45°
- Capacity: 1,400 riders per hour
- Height restriction: 48 in (122 cm)
- Trains: 2 trains with 4 cars; riders arranged 2 across in 3 rows for a total of 24 riders per train
- Fast Lane available
- Blue Streak at RCDB

Video

Blue Streak is a wooden roller coaster located at Cedar Point in Sandusky, Ohio, United States. Built by Philadelphia Toboggan Company, Blue Streak opened to the public on May 23, 1964. It is the oldest roller coaster operating at Cedar Point. In 2013, Blue Streak achieved its highest ranking in the annual Golden Ticket Awards publication by Amusement Today, ranking 27th among the world's top wooden roller coasters. In 2022, it was awarded a Coaster Landmark designation by American Coaster Enthusiasts.

== History ==
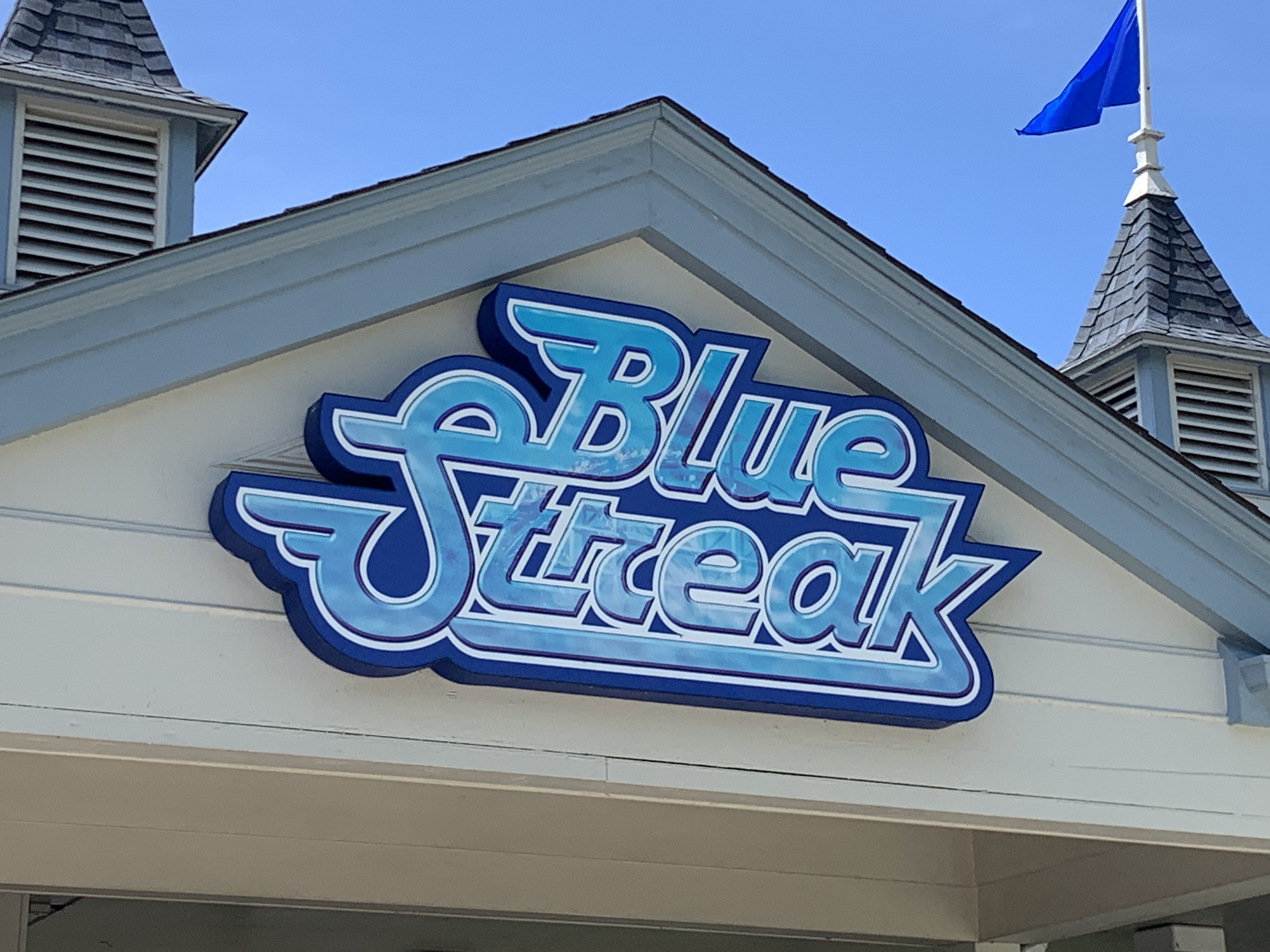
Blue Streak logo on station

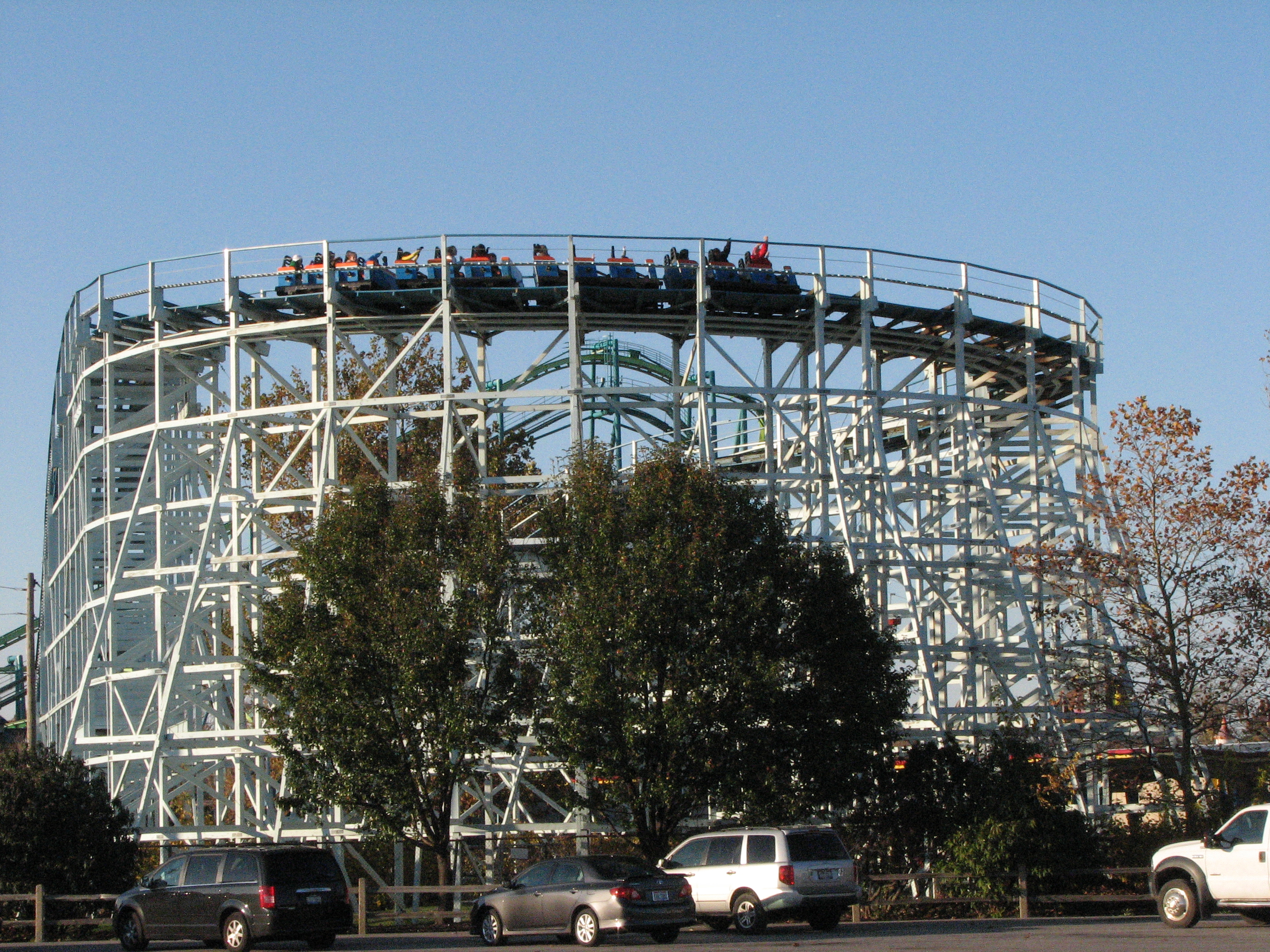
Blue Streak turnaround from the parking lot

Following the removal of Cyclone in 1951, more than a decade passed before Cedar Point decided to add another major roller coaster to its list of attractions. Several smaller coasters were added during this time, but only two remained by 1963. For the 1964 season, Philadelphia Toboggan Company was hired to build a new roller coaster under the direction of Frank F. Hoover and John C. Allen. Blue Streak opened to the public on May 23, 1964. It was one of only three roller coasters operating at the time within the park. The attraction's success led to a rebirth of roller coasters at Cedar Point, including the installation of Cedar Creek Mine Ride (1969), Corkscrew (1976), Gemini (1978) and Jr. Gemini (1979) (now known as Wilderness Run).

Blue Streak features a traditional "out-and-back" layout design. The roller coaster was named after the local Sandusky High School athletic nickname "The Blue Streaks". Cedar Point invested US$200,000 (equivalent to $2,076,180 in 2025) to construct the wooden roller coaster, and it remains a favorite at the park, consistently getting 30 minute to hour waits, and within annual roller coaster polls. In Amusement Today's 2013 Golden Ticket Awards, Blue Streak was ranked 27th among wooden roller coasters worldwide – its highest ranking to date.

On July 20, 2022, during Coaster Con 44, American Coaster Enthusiasts designated Blue Streak a Coaster Landmark.

== Ride experience ==
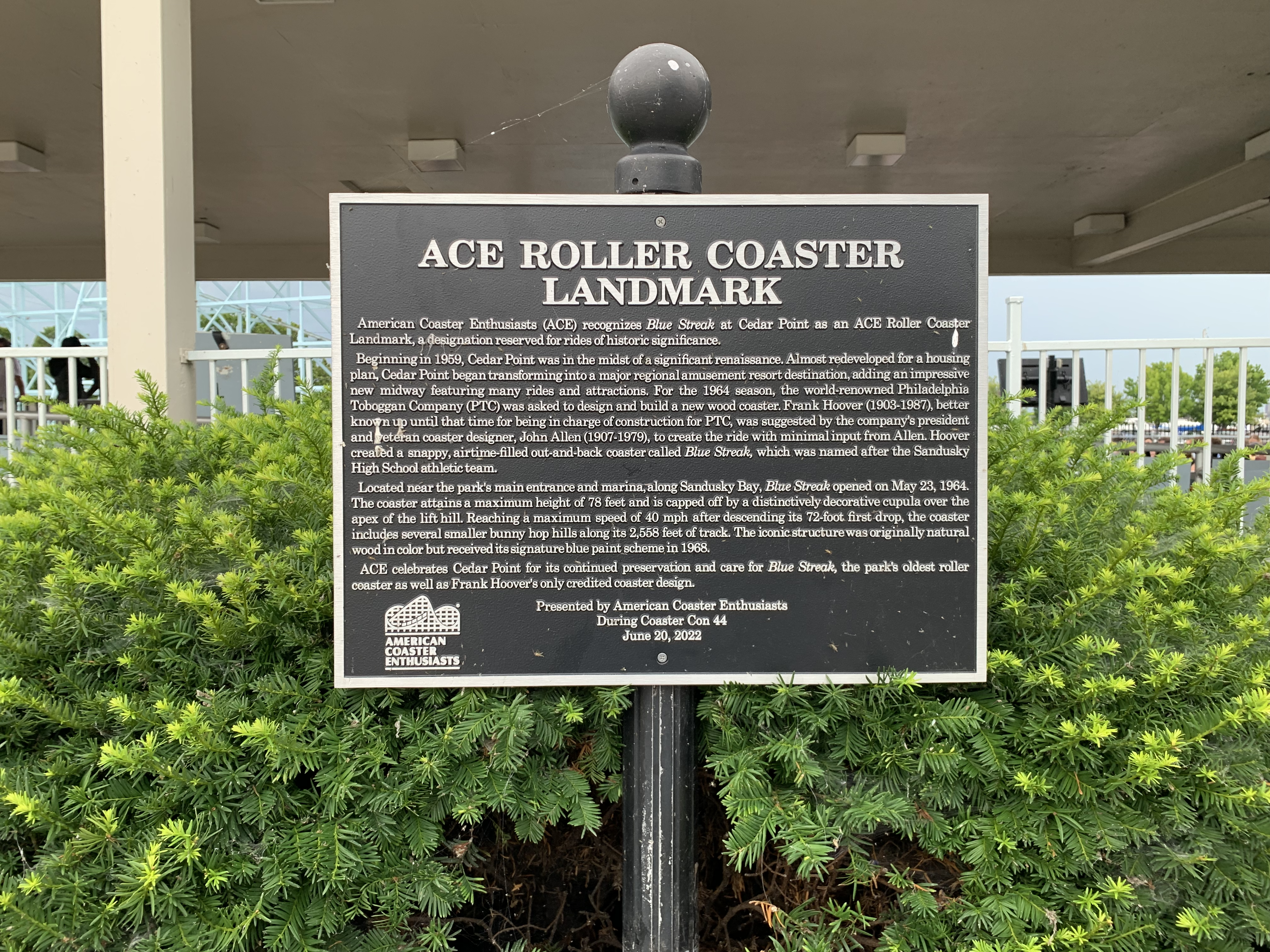
ACE roller coaster landmark sign

After a 78-foot climb (24 m) up its lift hill, the train descends 72 feet (22 m) at a 45-degree angle reaching a top speed of 40 miles per hour (64 km/h). Riders then enter a series of two short hills which provide the ride's maximum airtime followed by a larger, third hill that slows the train slightly. After the next drop, the train climbs into a 180-degree turn that sends riders over a short hill followed by three medium-sized hills on its way back. The ride ends on the track's final brake run before returning to the station.

== Rankings ==
Golden Ticket Awards: Top wood Roller Coasters
Year									1998	1999
Ranking									–	–
Year	2000	2001	2002	2003	2004	2005	2006	2007	2008	2009
Ranking	–	48	34	35	42	38	38	48	41	47
Year	2010	2011	2012	2013	2014	2015	2016	2017	2018	2019
Ranking	47	49	38	27	35	35	42	42	41	38
Year	2020	2021	2022	2023	2024	2025	2026			
Ranking	N/A	–	41 (tie)	–	–	–	–			
