= Orient Express (roller coaster) =

Defunct roller coaster at Worlds of Fun

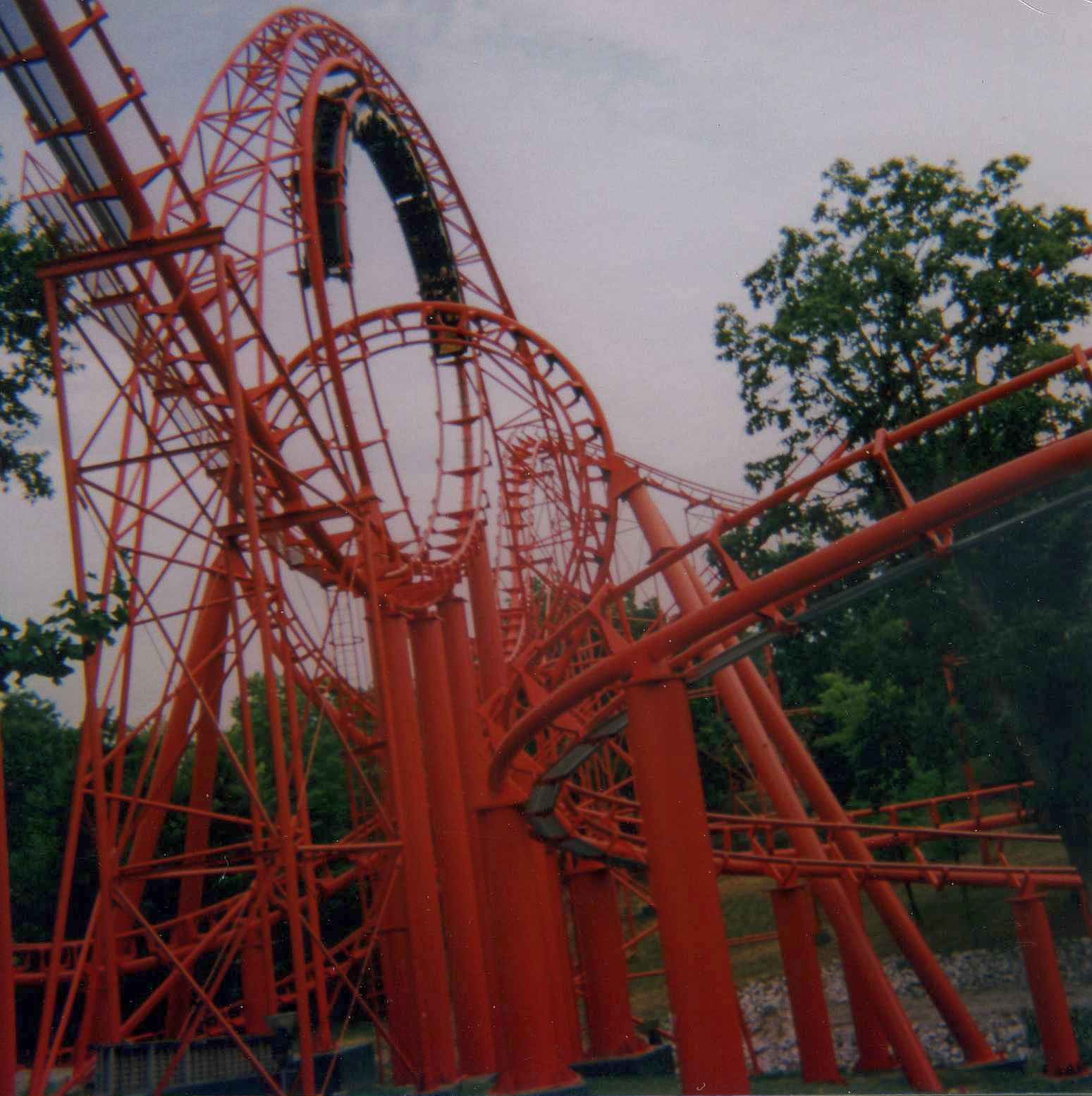
- Orient Express in 2002

Worlds of Fun
- Location: Worlds of Fun
- Park section: Orient
- Coordinates: 39.176133°N 94.488338°W
- Status: Removed
- Opening date: April 4, 1980
- Closing date: October 26, 2003

General statistics
- Type: Steel
- Manufacturer: Arrow Dynamics
- Designer: Ron Toomer
- Model: Custom Looping Coaster
- Track layout: Terrain
- Lift/launch system: Chain lift hill
- Height: 117 ft (36 m)
- Drop: 115 ft (35 m)
- Length: 3,470 ft (1,060 m)
- Speed: 50 mph (80 km/h)
- Inversions: 4
- Duration: 2:00
- Max vertical angle: 55°
- Capacity: 1,550 riders per hour
- G-force: 3.5
- Height restriction: 48 in (122 cm)
- Orient Express at RCDB

Orient Express was a steel roller coaster located at Worlds of Fun in Kansas City, Missouri. Introduced in 1980, the ride was manufactured by Arrow Huss and designed by Ron Toomer. It was removed following the 2003 season. The red-orange track was located between the two entrances of the park. The station house was retained for use with a haunted attraction during the park's annual Halloween event.

== History ==
On November 19, 1979, Worlds of Fun announced that Orient Express would be coming to the park. The ride officially opened on April 4, 1980.

In 1990, Orient Express celebrated its 10th anniversary with a Coaster Mania event. During the celebration, visitors could receive a roller coaster guidebook with entry forms that could win them a variety of prizes including a vacation to Hawaii.

For the 2000 season, the ride was repainted light maroon. It was originally painted dark maroon.

On October 29, 2003, Worlds of Fun announced that Orient Express would be demolished. Demolition began in November and was completed in early 2004. The lead car for the no. 2 train was donated to the National Roller Coaster Museum and Archives in Plainview, Texas.

== Ride experience ==
Orient Express was the first coaster ever to have a "Kamikaze Curve" element, which was later termed a "boomerang" by Arrow Development and a "batwing" by Bolliger & Mabillard. This element consists of a 90-degree rise to the right or left (similar to half a corkscrew), followed by half of a traditional loop element, then a rising half loop, then a final 90-degree dive sending the track in the opposite direction from which it entered the element. This element was common on Arrow's larger multi-element looping coasters and on B&M's inverted roller coasters, as well as on the Vekoma designed Goudurix at Parc Astérix, where it was known as a "Double Sidewinder". Orient Express also featured a tunnel prior to the lift hill that housed the Orient Express Dragon, a wooden sign that had the ride's logo illuminated.

The queue house had a "chicken exit" that guests could take if they became too nervous to ride. The sign for the chicken exit now resides in the station house for Timber Wolf.

Orient Express was also the second full circuit roller coaster to have interlocking loops, the Loch Ness Monster being the first. Lightnin' Loops at Six Flags Great Adventure, which opened less than a month before Loch Ness Monster in 1978, was the first roller coaster to have interlocking loops, but the coaster was made up of two separate shuttle tracks. With the retirement of Orient Express, Loch Ness Monster is the only coaster installation of any kind with this feature.

=== Circuits ===
Number of trains: 3
Number of cars per train: 7
Passengers per car: 4

The ride was broken into 4 blocks. The station block was the loading where one train loads and unloads. Block A was the start of the ride to the top of the lift. Block B was the top of the lift to halfway through the mid-course (C-Brake). Block C was from halfway through the mid-course (C-Brake) to the final brakes at the end of the ride. When running three trains, one would be in the station loading passengers while the second would be climbing the lift and the third was out on the track. As the lift train cleared the lift, the house train was released for the lift. This was a fast-paced operation since the car had to enter the house, unload and load all in the span of time it took a train to climb the lift. Shutdowns would happen when the train in the station was not dispatched causing the second train to stop in the final brakes just outside the station and in chain reaction, causing the third train to stop in the C-Brake. This was mainly caused by riders taking too long to exit or load in the train.

Restart after a shutdown required the assistance of the parks' maintenance staff. One person would go to the manual brake release under the C brake while the other ran the control panel brake in the house. One train would be taken to the top of the lift and stopped. The second train would be stopped at the C brake before the second inverted loop. The third train would be in the house. To start the process, the C brake was pulled to release the train for the second loop. The lift train would be released as soon as the C block train was clear of the brake. Once the lift train cleared the house train was released.

Over time only two would run at a time due to the ride's blocking system. If there was a backup in the station it caused a train to stop just outside the station and another train would stop halfway through the ride on the C-Brake. This caused the ride to shut down and the only way to get the train out of the trim brakes halfway through the ride was to have an employee climb up the C-Brake stairs and manually release the brakes.

=== Layout ===
After departing the station, the train passed through a 100-foot-long (30 m) tunnel and made a right turn into a 117-foot (36 m) lift hill. After cresting the top, the train took a slight dip as it turned right, and then descended 115 feet (35 m) down the first drop, reaching a maximum speed of 50 mph (80 km/h). This was followed by a left-hand turnaround and a small drop into an 80-foot (24 m) vertical loop. The train then turned right into a mid-course brake run, followed by another right into a 60-foot (18 m) vertical loop, which was interlocked with the first. This loop was followed by a double-inverting Kamikaze Curve, the first of its kind that years later became widely known as a batwing element. After exiting both inversions, the train entered the track's finale, a left-turning, ascending helix. This was followed by a right turn into the final brake run, before returning to the station.

== Incidents ==
- On June 14, 1987, a train that was entering the station collided into another that was loading passengers. A total of 56 passengers were involved in the accident, but only 8 were taken to the hospital for injuries.
- On July 17, 1999, the last two cars in the rear of the train derailed, stranding riders 35 feet (11 m) above the ground for several hours. The cause of the accident was determined to be a metal fracture in the support structure.
