= Carolina Cyclone =

Steel roller coaster at Carowinds

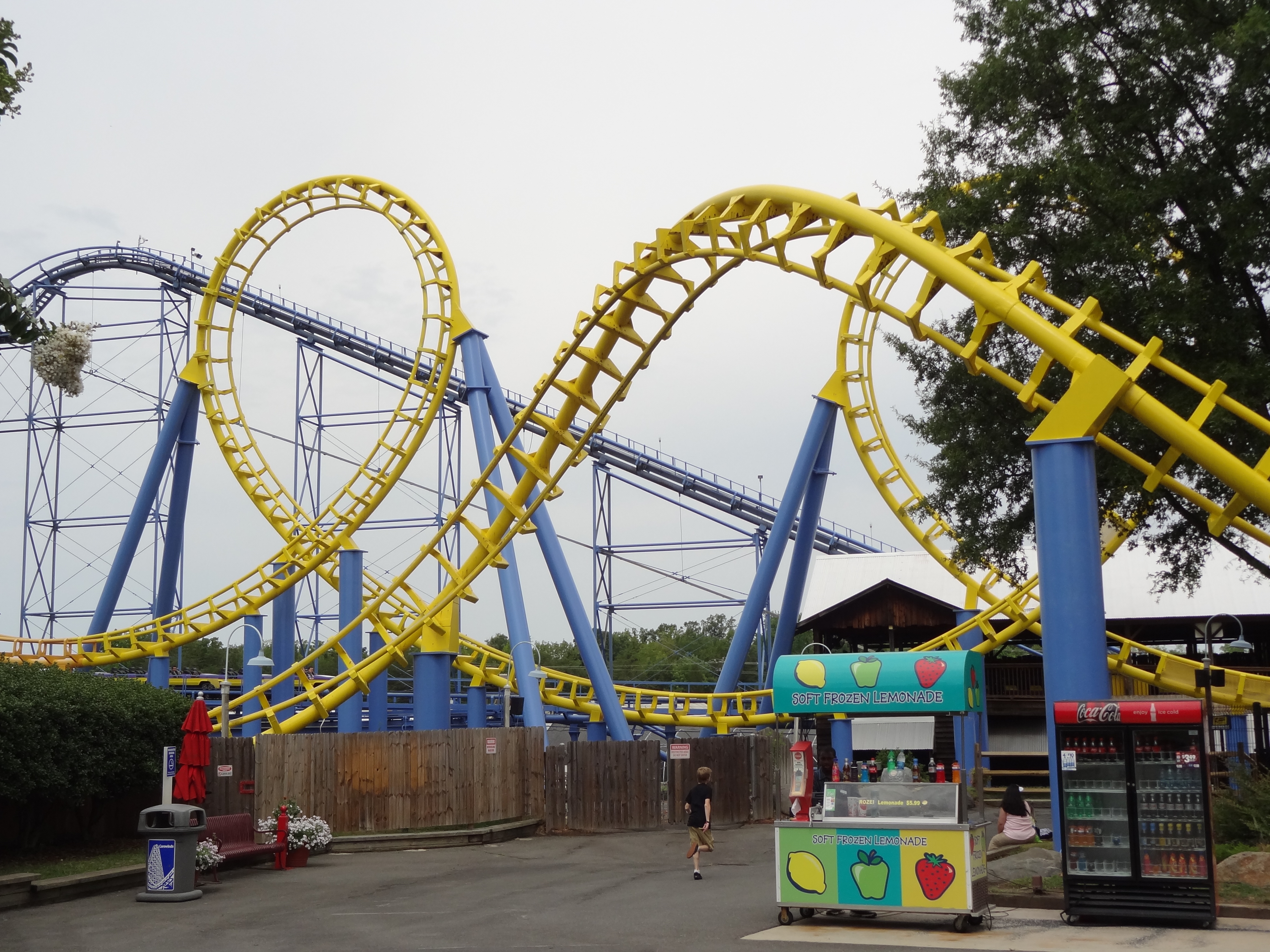
- The ride's consecutive loops and a corkscrew in 2012

Carowinds
- Location: Carowinds
- Park section: Carolina Boardwalk
- Coordinates: 35°06′15″N 80°56′37″W
- Status: Operating
- Opening date: March 22, 1980
- Cost: $2,000,000

General statistics
- Type: Steel
- Manufacturer: Arrow Dynamics
- Designer: Ron Toomer
- Model: Custom Looping Coaster
- Lift/launch system: Chain lift hill
- Height: 95 ft (29 m)
- Drop: 65 ft (20 m)
- Length: 2,100 ft (640 m)
- Speed: 41 mph (66 km/h)
- Inversions: 4
- Duration: 1:30
- Max vertical angle: 53°
- Capacity: 1,600 riders per hour
- G-force: 3.5
- Height restriction: 48 in (122 cm)
- Trains: 2 trains with 7 cars; riders arranged 2 across in 2 rows for a total of 28 riders per train
- Fast Lane available
- Carolina Cyclone at RCDB

Carolina Cyclone is an Arrow Dynamics roller coaster located at Carowinds in Charlotte, North Carolina. The coaster is located in the Carolina Boardwalk area of the park. Built in 1980 by now defunct coaster manufacturer Arrow Dynamics, it was the first roller coaster to have four inversions: two loops and two corkscrews.

== History ==
On June 21, 1979, Carowinds announced that they would be building a new roller coaster for the 1980 season. It would be called Carolina Cyclone and be the first roller coaster to have four inversions. Carolina Cyclone officially opened to the public on March 22, 1980.

The ride was originally painted with red-orange track and black supports, and later bluish-green track with black supports, and later with blue track and dark gray supports. For the 2010 season, a new paint job was applied. The supports are light blue along the entire ride. The track on the brake run, station, and lift hill were also painted light blue, while the inversions were painted yellow, and the rest of the track was painted orange. In late 2021, the ride received yet another repaint. Multiple colors were put on the track to see how they would look. The supports are white and the entire track is turquoise blue.

After the 2019 season, Carolina Cyclone received new trains from another Arrow Dynamics looping coaster, the defunct Vortex at sister park Kings Island.

== Ride experience ==
The train exits the station, makes a sharp left turn and ascends a 95-foot (29 m) lift hill. A small pre-drop and turn follows, which leads into the track's 65-foot (20 m) drop. This is followed by two 85-foot (26 m) vertical loops and a small hill with a banked turn. As the train makes its way over the walkway, it flips riders twice in a double corkscrew. The finale is a helix that winds low to the ground and raises back up into the brake run before returning to the station.

Preceded by Corkscrew	Most Inversions On A Roller Coaster; March 1980–May 1982; With: Demon May 1980–May 1982	Succeeded by Viper
