= Cedar Creek Mine Ride =

Roller coaster at Cedar Point

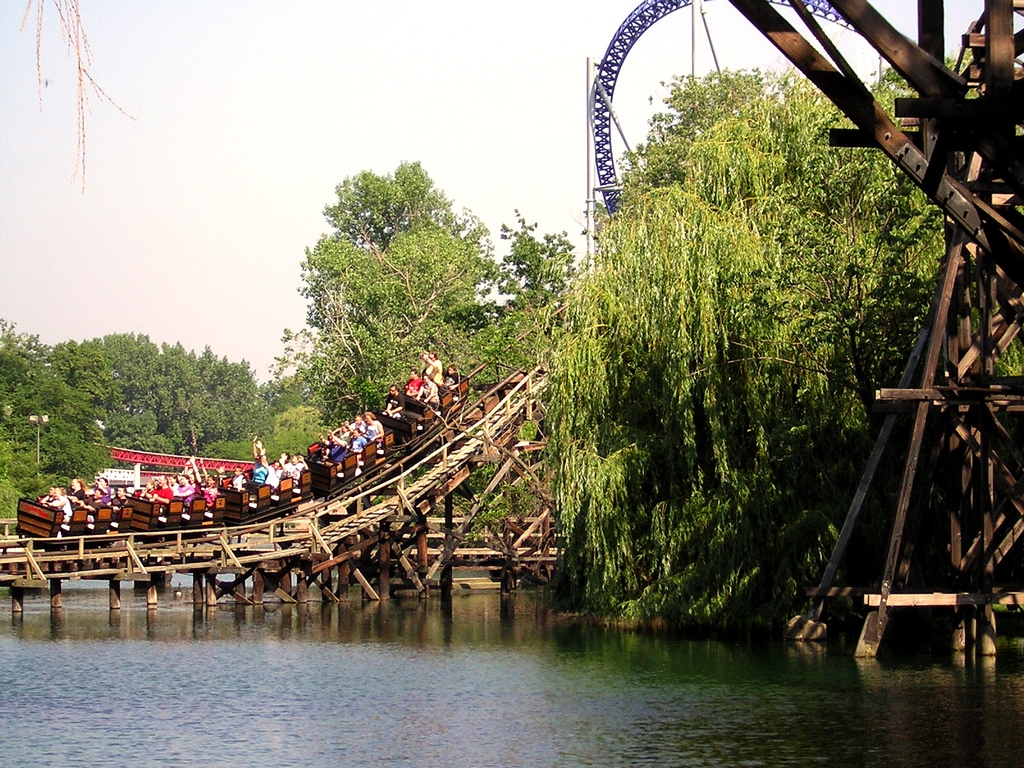

Cedar Point
- Location: Cedar Point
- Park section: Frontier Town
- Coordinates: 41°29′5″N 82°41′25.50″W
- Status: Operating
- Opening date: May 24, 1969

General statistics
- Type: Steel – Mine Train
- Manufacturer: Arrow Development
- Designer: Ron Toomer
- Model: Mine Train
- Lift/launch system: Two chain lift hills
- Height: 48 ft (15 m)
- Drop: 30 ft (9.1 m)
- Length: 2,540 ft (770 m)
- Speed: 42 mph (68 km/h)
- Inversions: 0
- Duration: 2:50
- Capacity: 2400 riders per hour
- Height restriction: 48 in (122 cm)
- Trains: 2 trains with 5 cars; riders arranged 2 across in 3 rows for a total of 30 riders per train
- Cedar Creek Mine Ride at RCDB

Video

Cedar Creek Mine Ride is a mine train roller coaster at Cedar Point amusement park in Sandusky, Ohio, United States. Built by Arrow Development, the roller coaster opened in 1969 in the Frontiertown section of the park. It is the second oldest roller coaster in operation at Cedar Point behind Blue Streak.

== History ==
Following the success of Matterhorn Bobsleds at Disneyland which opened in 1959, the tubular steel track design pioneered by Arrow Development was in high demand at other amusement parks around the world. Arrow developed a runaway mine train concept that would be used in many of its first roller coasters. Among them was the Cedar Creek Mine Ride at Cedar Point, which opened on May 24, 1969, as the centerpiece for the new Frontiertown section of the park. It is the second oldest roller coaster at Cedar Point and has given over 62 million rides since its debut.

In 2019, Cedar Creek Mine Ride celebrated its 50th anniversary. The attraction received some changes, including a new station soundtrack, special effects in the first tunnel, and mineshaft scenery in the queue.

== Ride experience ==
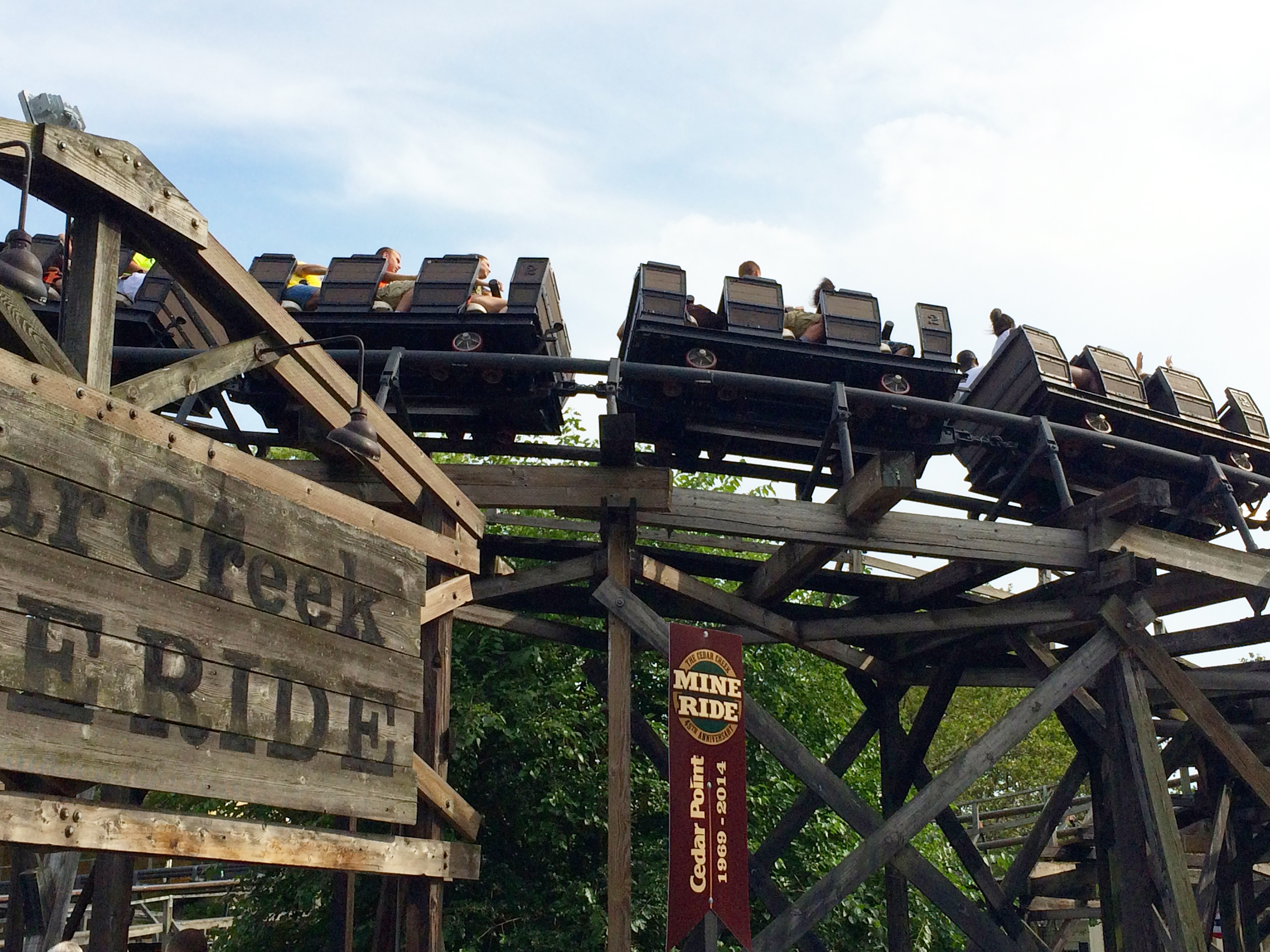
Cedar Creek Mine Ride trains in motion near the ride's entrance sign

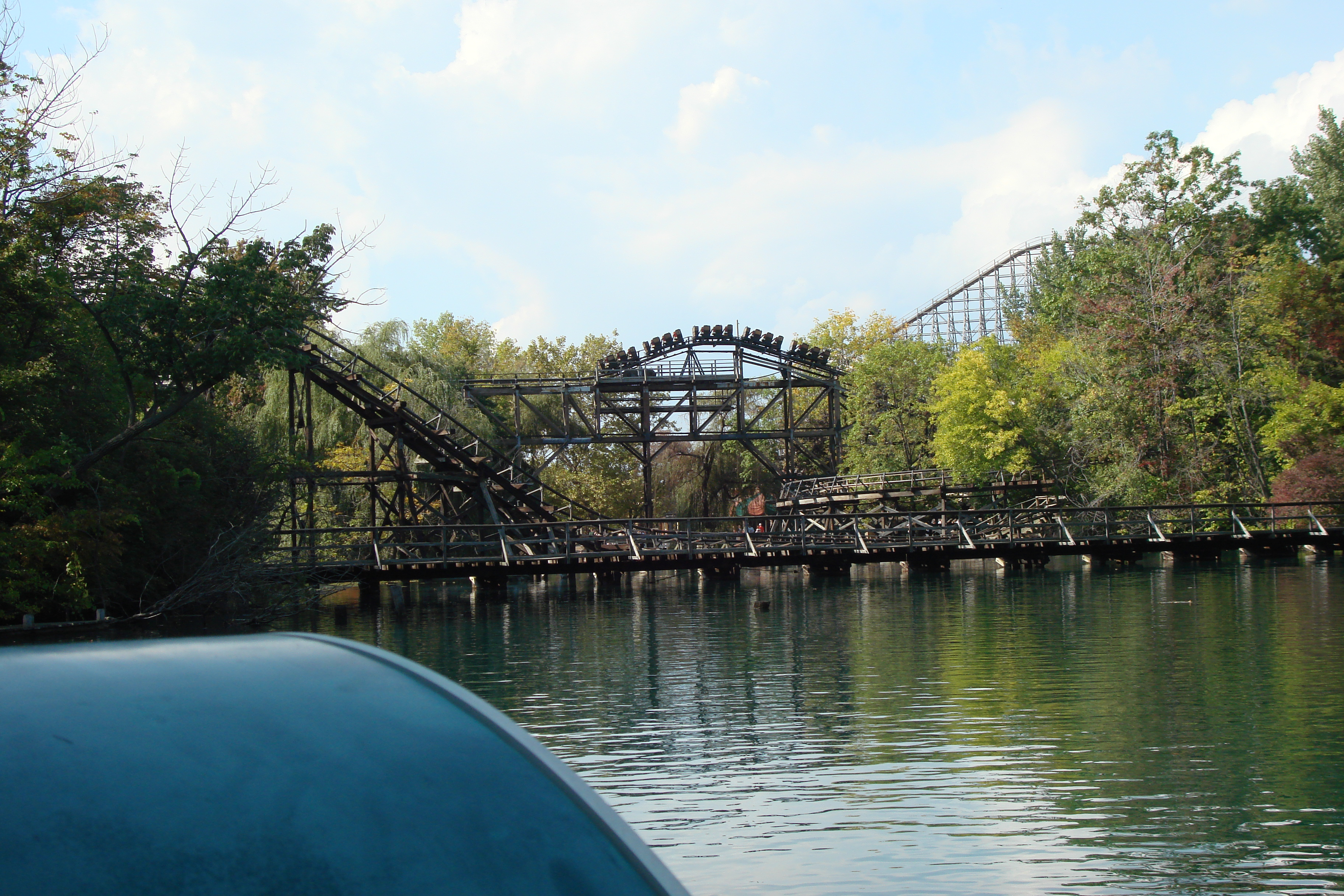
Cedar Creek Mine Ride as seen from Paddlewheel Excursions

Cedar Creek Mine Ride is a multi-lift hill roller coaster that features short dips and turns throughout a lightly wooded area and over a lagoon. The ride begins with the train entering a covered building resembling a mine shaft, where additional unused trains are stored, and then proceeds up the first lift hill. After reaching the top, the train dips slightly onto a straight section of track, followed by a short first drop that winds 270 degrees to the left during its gradual descent. As the train exits the turn, it ascends onto a straight section of track with a set of trim brakes that slow the train. This is followed by the ride's climax, its largest drop that send riders over a lagoon close to water level. The train then enters a series of turns to the left and a second lift hill. After another short dip at the top onto a straight section of track, the track turns left, then right twice, followed by a set of trim brakes that once again slow the train. It enters the finale, a double helix that takes riders low to the ground, ending with a short ascent onto the final brake run before returning to the station.

== Incidents ==
On May 24, 1984, a 5-year-old boy suffered a fractured skull and bruises after falling from the train's front seat during its 30 feet (9 m) drop. The ride had a 48-inch height restriction when it opened in 1969, but this was later relaxed to 48 inches or accompanied by a parent, so the boy may have been too small to ride. The park reinstated the original 48 inch height restriction and added thicker lap bars after the incident.

On July 30, 1988, injuries were reported after an empty train was released from the station and collided with a train full of passengers stuck on the coaster's second lift hill. Twelve people filed lawsuits against the park, eight of them passengers and four of them parents. On February 5, 1991, one of the plaintiffs was awarded $35,000 after the jury deliberated for about four hours. The victim suffered nerve, knee and back injuries.
