= Corkscrew (Silverwood) =

Roller coaster in Athol, Idaho

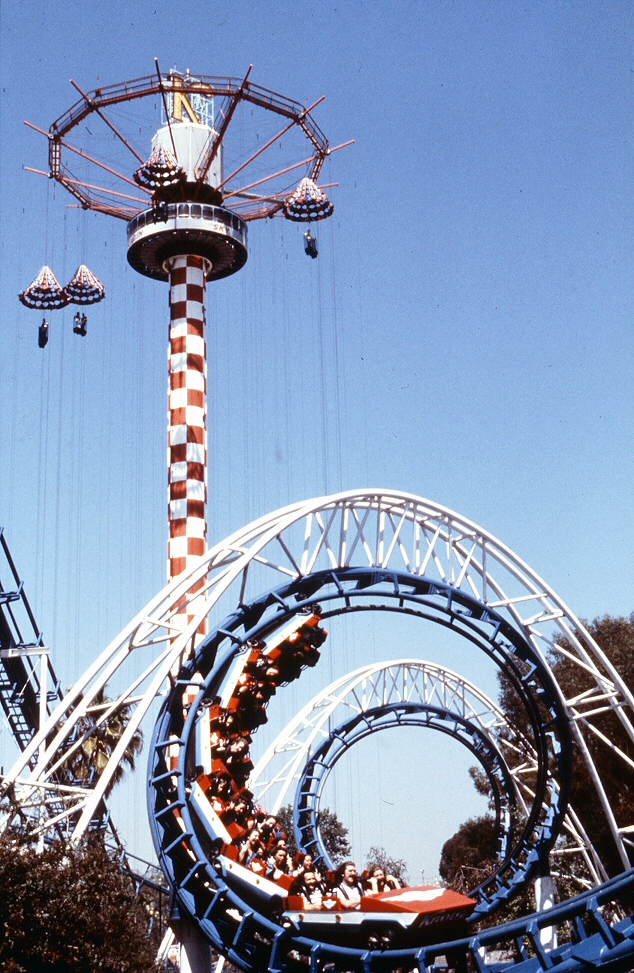
- At Knott's Berry Farm, circa 1980

Silverwood Theme Park
- Coordinates: 47.906974°N 116.708516°W
- Status: Operating
- Opening date: 1990
- Cost: US$1 million
- Corkscrew at Silverwood Theme Park at RCDB

Knott's Berry Farm
- Coordinates: 33.844652°N 118.001456°W
- Status: Removed
- Opening date: 21 May 1975
- Closing date: 1989
- Cost: US$700,000
- Replaced by: Boomerang
- Corkscrew at Knott's Berry Farm at RCDB

General statistics
- Type: Steel
- Manufacturer: Arrow Development
- Designer: Ron Toomer
- Model: Corkscrew
- Lift/launch system: Chain lift hill
- Height: 72 ft (22 m)
- Drop: 62 ft (19 m)
- Length: 1,250 ft (380 m)
- Speed: 46 mph (74 km/h)
- Inversions: 2
- Duration: 1:15
- Capacity: 600 riders per hour
- Height restriction: 48 in (122 cm)

Corkscrew is an Arrow Development prototype Corkscrew roller coaster located at Silverwood Theme Park in Athol, Idaho. Ten exact replicas of this same design were produced 1975–1979 at other scattered parks, followed by numerous other installations around the world featuring updated supports. After being sold as the prototype, this corkscrew originally operated at Knott's Berry Farm from 1975 to 1989. Developed by Ron Toomer of Arrow Dynamics, Corkscrew was the first modern steel inverting roller coaster open to the public, with identical models opening at three other parks days later.

== Ride experience ==
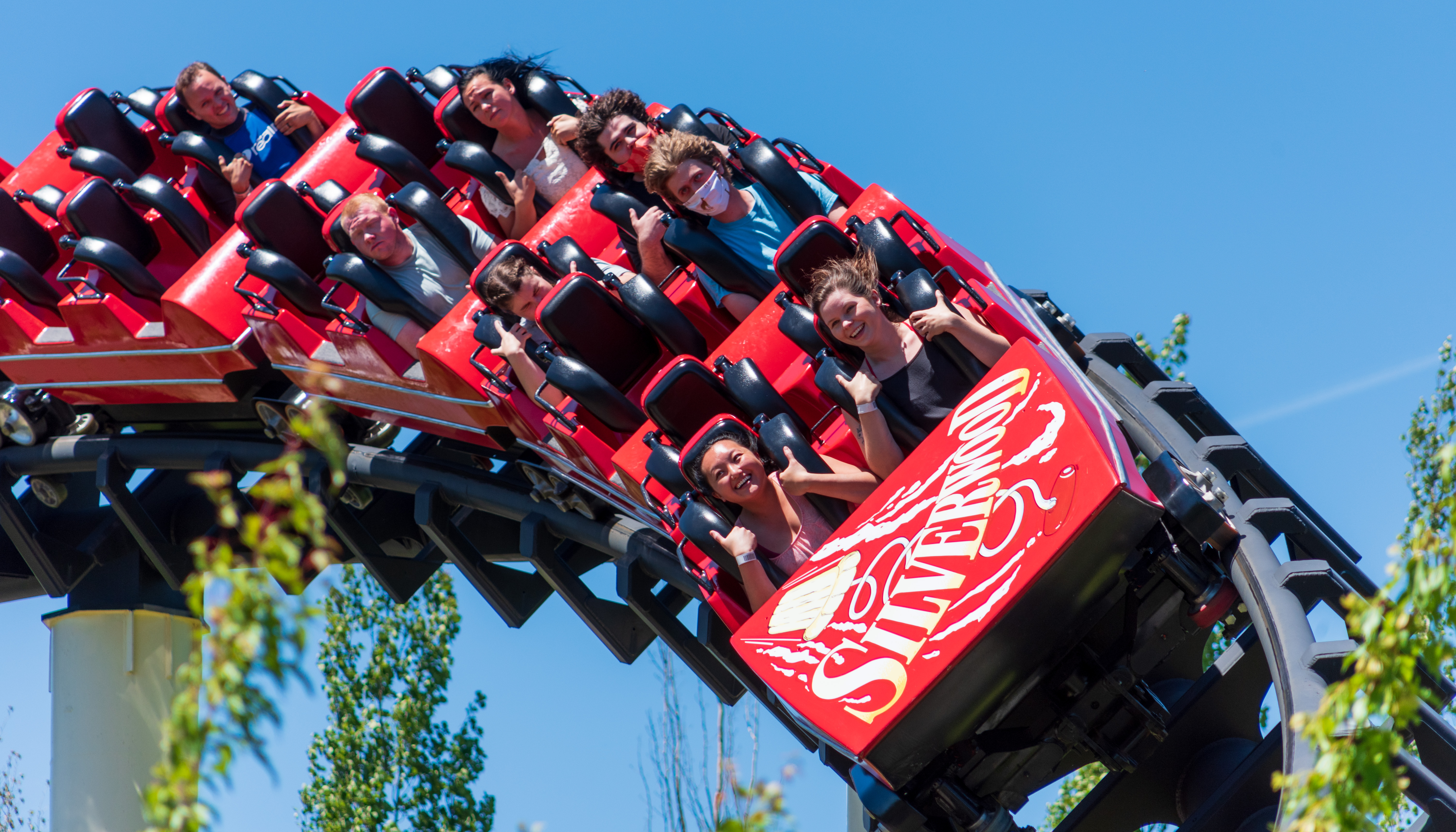
Corkscrew in 2020

After the train is dispatched from the station, it enters a small dip and into a short U-turn followed by a 70-foot-tall (21 m) chain lift hill. When the train reaches the top of the hill, the train slopes down and into a 90-degree banked turn. The train then enters the first drop and goes into a small camelback where riders experience a sensation of airtime. The train makes a sloped banked right turn and into a set of two consecutive corkscrews. The train then travels through one final 90-degree banked turn and into the brake run which leads back to the station.

== Historical achievements ==
When Corkscrew first opened at Knott's Berry Farm, it achieved two things of historical significance. Corkscrew was both the first modern inverting coaster in the world as well as the first modern roller coaster to take riders upside down twice. Corkscrew was actually a prototype originally built on site at Arrow Dynamics in Mountain View in Santa Clara County, California (before Arrow Dynamics' relocation to Utah). Once Arrow Dynamics completed reviewing the design, members of the Knott's family personally opted to purchase the prototype. Ten exact replicas were produced 1975–1979. In 1989 Knott's Berry Farm sold the Corkscrew to Silverwood Theme Park in Idaho for $250,000 to make room for Boomerang.
