= Viper (Six Flags Darien Lake) =

Steel roller coaster at Six Flags Darien Lake

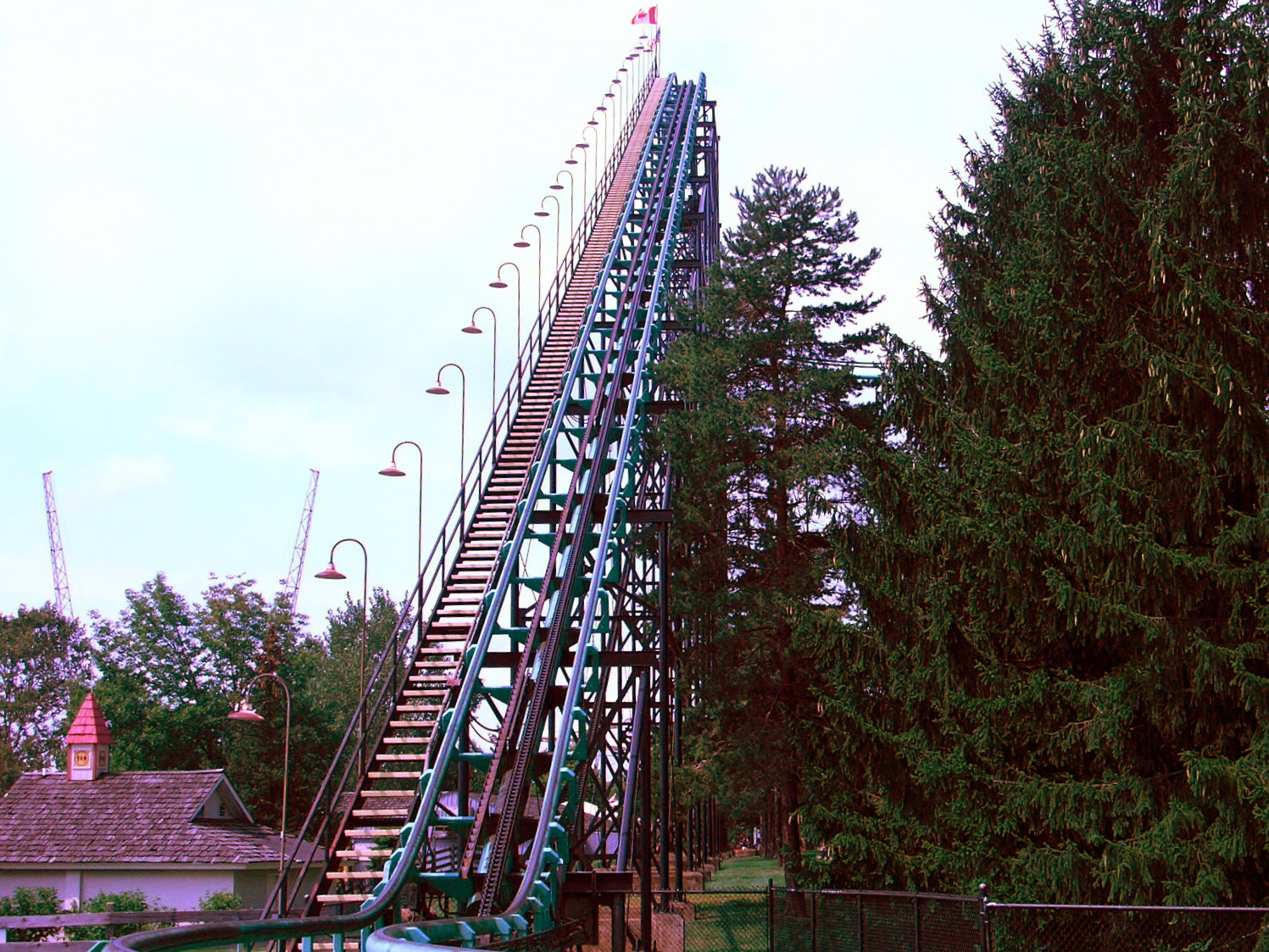
- Viper's 121-foot tall lift hill

Six Flags Darien Lake
- Location: Six Flags Darien Lake
- Coordinates: 42°55′42″N 78°22′54″W
- Status: Operating
- Opening date: May 29, 1982
- Cost: $6.5 million

General statistics
- Type: Steel
- Manufacturer: Arrow Dynamics
- Designer: Ron Toomer
- Model: Custom Looping Coaster
- Lift/launch system: Chain lift hill
- Height: 121 ft (37 m)
- Drop: 75 ft (23 m)
- Length: 3,100 ft (940 m)
- Speed: 50 mph (80 km/h)
- Inversions: 5
- Duration: 2:04
- Capacity: 2100 riders per hour
- Height restriction: 48 in (122 cm)
- Trains: 2 trains with 7 cars; riders arranged 2 across in 2 rows for a total of 28 riders per train
- Fast Lane available
- Viper at RCDB

Viper is a steel roller coaster located at Six Flags Darien Lake in Darien Center, New York. Built by Arrow Huss, the ride opened in 1982 as the first roller coaster in the world to feature five inversions, surpassing Carolina Cyclone at Carowinds and the Demon model at Six Flags Great America and California's Great America, all of which featured four. Viper retained the inversion record until Vortex opened at Kings Island in 1987 with six inversions.

== History ==
On November 17, 1981, Six Flags Darien Lake announced that they would be building a new roller coaster for the 1982 season. It would be built by Arrow Huss, and would be the park's first major roller coaster. It would also be the first roller coaster in the world to take riders upside down five times. The new coaster was set to be named Thunderbolt Express, but this was later changed to Viper.

Viper officially opened to guests on May 29, 1982. The ride's track and supports were originally all black. It was later repainted to feature green track with black supports when Six Flags took over the park in 1999. In 2010, it was repainted entirely black once again.

The ride originally was capable of running three trains, and these trains were color coded blue, red, and yellow. In 2013, two of the trains were given green vinyl wraps to appear more snake-like. The third train was disassembled and used as spare parts for the other two trains. Currently, Viper runs with one train, switching between its two operational trains each year.

== Ride experience ==
After exiting the station, the track makes a wide U-turn to the lift hill, which then pulls the train up 121 feet (37 m) above the ground. Viper features a 10-foot (3 m) pre-drop, which gives the train enough momentum to round a bend to the right, before falling down the first real drop of roughly 75 feet (23 m). At the bottom of the first drop, the train reaches its maximum speed of 50 mph (80 km/h), which is followed by a vertical loop. Next, the train enters a batwing element (also known as a "boomerang" on Arrow Dynamics coasters), which is a heart-shaped series of two inversions, consisting of a reverse sidewinder followed by a sidewinder. After a left turn, the train enters the midcourse brake run. Next, the track makes a 180° turn to the right and enters two consecutive corkscrews. It then traverses a 540° helix, featuring a 110 foot long tunnel, at the entrance of which an on-ride camera is mounted, before finally returning to the station.

The on-ride camera was previously mounted at the end of the second corkscrew. For the 2017 season, the camera was positioned at the top of the entrance to the tunnel.

Preceded by Carolina Cyclone; Demon	Most Inversions On A Roller Coaster; May 29, 1982 – April 11, 1987	Succeeded by Vortex
