= Ron Toomer =

Roller coaster designer

- Born: May 31, 1930; Pasadena, California, U.S.
- Died: September 26, 2011 (aged 81); Bedford, Texas, U.S.
- Occupation: Roller coaster designer
- Known for: Arrow Dynamics

Ronald Valentine Toomer (May 31, 1930 – September 26, 2011) was an American roller coaster designer credited for designing 93 roller coasters around the world. He graduated from the University of Nevada, Reno in 1961 with a degree in mechanical engineering and was a part of the design team responsible for the Apollo spacecraft heat shield.

== Career ==
Toomer was hired by Arrow Development founders Karl Bacon and Ed Morgan in 1965 to help design a mine train ride called Run-A-Way Mine Train at Six Flags Over Texas. It opened in 1966 utilizing the tubular steel rail technology that had been developed by Arrow for Disneyland's Matterhorn Bobsleds. The concept caught on quickly and Toomer designed 15 more mine train coasters for Arrow. All but one are still operating today. Following almost four years of development, Toomer introduced the modern looping roller coaster in 1975 with the opening of Corkscrew, the first in the world with two inversions, at Knott's Berry Farm. Knott's is credited with having the first, but three more identical coasters opened later that same year. The following year he introduced the familiar Arrow teardrop-shaped vertical loop on a custom corkscrew coaster at Cedar Point amusement park in Sandusky, Ohio. At Cedar Point in 1989, Toomer unveiled the first roller coaster to top 200 feet (61 m) known as Magnum XL-200.

In 1981, Arrow Development was purchased by Huss Maschinenfabrik, which merged with Arrow Development to form Arrow-Huss. Toomer was made vice president and manager of engineering. In 1986, 13 of the company's American officers negotiated a buyout, and formed Arrow Dynamics to which Toomer was named president. In 1993 he was promoted to chairman of the board then became a consulting director in 1995. Toomer retired from Arrow Dynamics in 1998.

Although Toomer primarily designed coasters for Arrow, he also assisted with some of the other Arrow products, which included providing structural engineering for the company's Log Flumes.

Rumors circulated that Toomer never rode any of his own rides, though he did suffer from motion sickness. He has said otherwise, however, stating "I've ridden enough to know what they are like."

== Notable designs ==
Ron Toomer's designs were highly innovative with many of his coasters breaking records.

He has designed and made the following:

- Runaway Mine Train (Six Flags Over Texas), first mine train type coaster.
- Roaring 20's Corkscrew, (Knott's Berry Farm), first coaster with two inversions.
- Corkscrew (Cedar Point), first with three inversions.
- Carolina Cyclone (Carowinds), first with four inversions.
- Viper (Darien Lake), first with five inversions.
- Vortex (Kings Island), first with six inversions.
- Shockwave (Six Flags Great America), first with seven inversions.
- Motorcycle Chase (Knott's Berry Farm), first modern-day steeplechase coaster.
- Loch Ness Monster (Busch Gardens Williamsburg), first with interlocking vertical loops.
- Orient Express (Worlds of Fun), introduced the Arrow Boomerang Element, originally called a Kamikaze Curve.
- The Bat (Kings Island), prototype suspended coaster, although not the first suspended, it was the first in an amusement park.
- Gemini (Cedar Point), only Arrow racing coaster, record breaking height when opened.
- Magnum XL-200 (Cedar Point), first to exceed 200 feet.
- The Pepsi Max Big One (Blackpool Pleasure Beach), opened as the world's tallest and steepest coaster.

== Personal life and death ==
Toomer married Betty in 1957. He died in 2011, aged 81, after a short battle with cancer. His widow survived him by five years.

== Awards ==
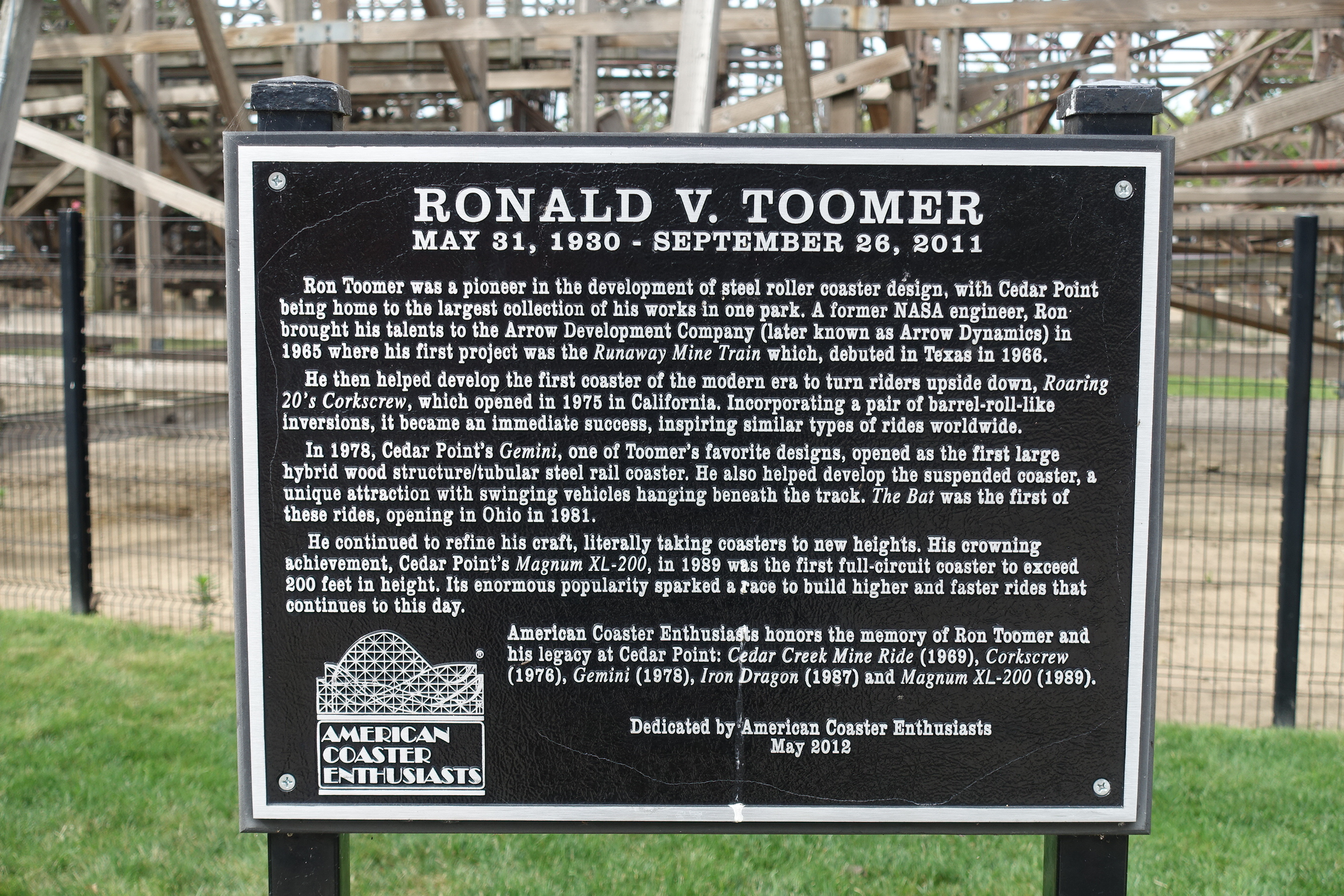
Ron Toomer - Cedar Point plaque

In 2000 Ron Toomer was inducted into the IAAPA Hall of Fame as a Living Legend.

Four of Toomer's coasters have been designated Roller Coaster Landmarks by American Coaster Enthusiasts: Corkscrew, Loch Ness Monster, Magnum XL-200 and Run-A-Way Mine Train.
