= Arrow Dynamics =

Defunct American roller coaster manufacturer

- Industry: Amusement Rides
- Predecessor: Arrow Development Company Inc; Arrow Huss Inc
- Founded: 1986
- Founder: Ronald Toomer; Otis Hughes; Brent Meikle
- Defunct: 2002
- Fate: Bankruptcy And Liquidation, assets bought by S&S Arrow
- Successor: S&S Worldwide
- Headquarters: Clearfield, Utah, United States
- Key people: Ron Toomer; Alan Schilke
- Products: Roller Coasters

Arrow Dynamics logo (1986–2000)

Arrow Dynamics was an American manufacturing and engineering company that specialized in designing and building amusement park rides, especially roller coasters. Based in Clearfield, Utah, the company was the successor to Arrow Development (1946–1981) and Arrow Huss (1981–1986), which were responsible for several influential advancements in the amusement and theme park industries. Among the most significant was tubular steel track, which provided a smoother ride than the railroad style rails commonly used prior to the 1960s on wooden roller coasters. The Matterhorn Bobsleds at Disneyland, built in 1959, was Arrow's first roller coaster project.

In 1975, Arrow Development introduced the first corkscrew style track Corkscrew, at Knott's Berry Farm that sent riders through a series of corkscrews. Arrow created several other "firsts" over the years, introducing the first suspended roller coaster in almost a century, The Bat, in 1981, and the first "hypercoaster", Magnum XL-200, which opened in 1989. They built the first 4th Dimension roller coaster, X2, which was designed by Alan Schilke in 2002.

Arrow Development's ownership changed three times between the 1950s and 1980s. Arrow Dynamics would eventually survive two bankruptcies and spin off a sister company, Fabriweld, primarily to build track, by 1988. Arrow Dynamics eventually closed on December 3, 2001. S&S Worldwide purchased part of Arrow's remaining assets on October 28, 2002, and the remainder of the company was dissolved. In 2012, Sansei Yusoki Co. of Osaka, Japan, acquired a 77.3% interest in S&S - Arrow.

== History ==
=== Beginnings ===
Arrow Dynamics' forerunner, Arrow Development, was founded in 1946 when Ed Morgan, Karl Bacon, Bill Hardiman, and Angus "Andy" Anderson, started a machine shop in Mountain View, California. They started out selling used machine tools, building truck parts, and repairing cars until about 1950 when they built their first merry-go-rounds for San Jose's Alum Rock Park.

In 1953, they contacted Walt Disney, who was just beginning to plan a new type of amusement park in California. Disney hired the company to help design and build the vehicles for Mr. Toad's Wild Ride. They would eventually design and build the ride systems for many of Disneyland's original and early rides, including Mad Tea Party, King Arthur Carrousel, Casey Jr. Circus Train, and Snow White's Scary Adventures. Disney continued to use Arrow as Disneyland expanded. Arrow designed and built Dumbo the Flying Elephant, Autopia, and Alice in Wonderland in coming years as well as upgrading and renovating the King Arthur Carrousel.

=== Roller coaster manufacturing ===
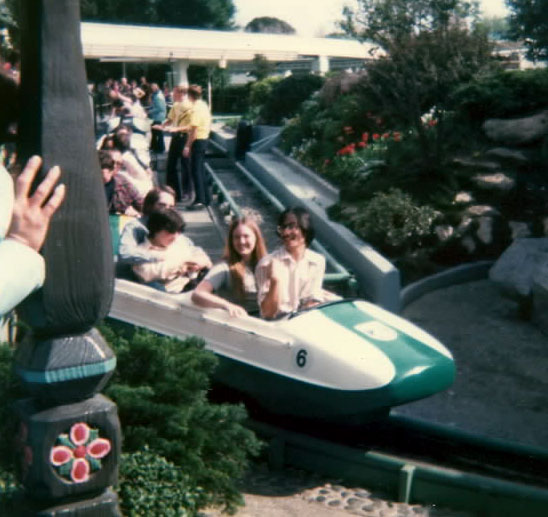
Matterhorn Bobsleds, the first Arrow Development roller coaster.

In 1959, Arrow Development designed what was to be their first of many roller coasters, the Matterhorn Bobsleds at Disneyland in Anaheim, California. Built in conjunction with WED Imagineering, the ride was the first modern tubular steel tracked roller coaster.

After construction of the Matterhorn, Disney bought a third of Arrow Development in an effort to keep them viable and at least partially in-house. Arrow had already developed rides for other customers, and had orders for more, so they moved into a larger plant in Mountain View. At the new location, Arrow developed vehicles, flumes and tracks for It's a Small World, Pirates of the Caribbean, Adventure Thru Inner Space, and the Haunted Mansion.

Arrow developed the modern log flume ride, eventually installing over 50 around the world, beginning with El Aserradero at Six Flags Over Texas in 1963. In the 1970s, the company perfected and brought back the looping roller coaster.

In 1975, Arrow installed one of the most important rides of its time, Corkscrew, which made its debut at Knott's Berry Farm as the first modern inverting coaster. Arrow made hundreds of coasters throughout the decades, including 17 Corkscrew-style coasters, 16 "runaway mine train" coasters like Cedar Creek Mine Ride and Adventure Express, custom-designed coasters like Loch Ness Monster, and Carolina Cyclone.

Some of Arrow Development's later projects included what were at the time the world's tallest roller coasters, such as Magnum XL-200 at Cedar Point in 1989, and The Big One at Blackpool Pleasure Beach in 1994.

=== Reorganizations and bankruptcy ===
Arrow Huss logo (1981–1985)

In 1971, Karl Bacon, Ed Morgan and Walter Schulze sold Arrow Development to Rio Grande Industries. At the time, Penn Central owned Six Flags and Rio Grande had plans to build theme parks of their own, purchasing Frontier Village in 1973. In the late 1970s, Arrow began teaching Vekoma how to build tubular track in their native Holland, and in return Vekoma became Arrow's European distributor. Rio Grande sold Arrow to the German manufacturing firm Huss Maschinenfabrik in 1981. The merger formed Arrow Huss. Dana Morgan, the son of Ed Morgan, was appointed the company's president, and Ron Toomer was made vice president and manager of engineering. Dana would leave the company and form Morgan Manufacturing in 1983. Although Arrow's coasters continued to sell well, Arrow Huss struggled financially, partially due to heavily investing in the Darien Lake theme park in New York, and the 1984 Louisiana World Exposition in New Orleans. Arrow Huss filed for bankruptcy in 1985, and 13 of the company's American officers negotiated a buyout. In 1986, the takeover was approved by the courts and the company re-emerged as Arrow Dynamics. Toomer served as president until 1993, Chairman of the Board until 1995, and as a consulting director until his retirement in 1998.

In the late 1990s, Arrow Dynamic's bookings steadily decreased, with few installations toward the end of the decade. Despite attempts to keep up by implementing more updated design techniques, Arrow still found itself struggling to compete. Other manufacturers such as Bolliger & Mabillard and Intamin began to dominate the industry.

Design and manufacturing costs for new, larger ride systems were increasing and competition grew. Bankruptcy loomed once again just as Arrow introduced X (subsequently known as X^{2}) at Six Flags Magic Mountain, a 4th dimension roller coaster designed by Alan Schilke. X opened to massive media attention and received an initially positive reception; however, several mechanical problems caused the ride to be closed for repairs during much of its first year of operation.

The company filed for bankruptcy again on December 3, 2001. At the end of October 2002, the remaining assets were sold to S&S Worldwide, a limited liability company related to amusement ride manufacturer, forming S&S Arrow. In November 2012, Sansei Yusoki Co., Ltd., of Osaka, Japan, acquired a 77.3% interest in S&S.

== Milestones ==
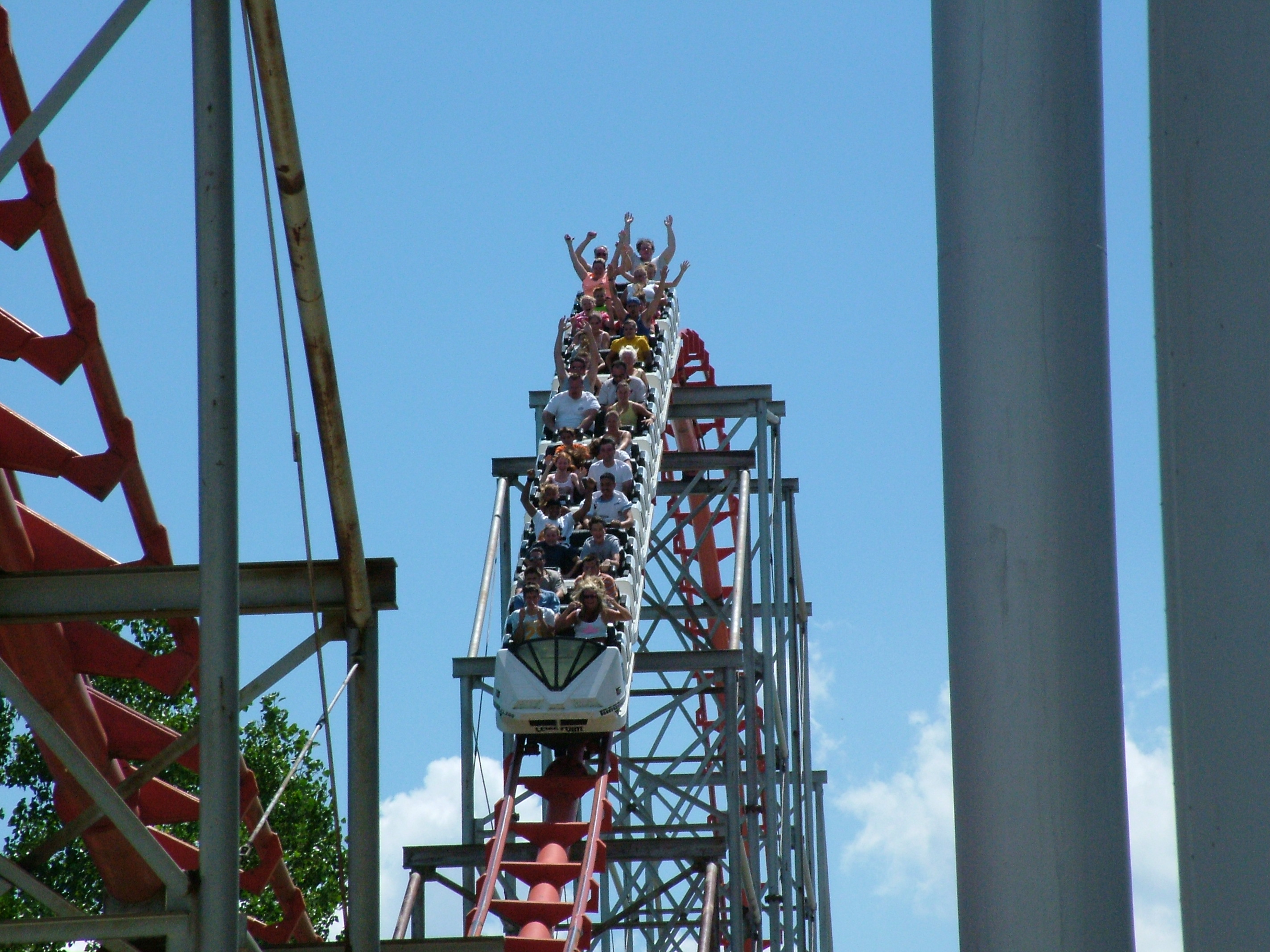
Magnum XL-200, the first roller coaster in the world to pass the 200 ft mark.

- 1959: The first tubular steel track coaster, Matterhorn Bobsleds, at Disneyland
- 1963: The first Log Flume, El Aserradero at Six Flags Over Texas
- 1966: The first mine train roller coaster, featuring the first underwater tunnel, the Runaway Mine Train at Six Flags Over Texas
- 1975: The first modern inverting coaster, Corkscrew, at Knott's Berry Farm
- 1976: The first coaster with three inversions, Corkscrew at Cedar Point
- 1977: The first coaster with consecutive vertical loops, Double Loop, at Geauga Lake
- 1978: The first interlocking loops, Loch Ness Monster at Busch Gardens Williamsburg
- 1980: The first coaster with four inversions, Carolina Cyclone at Carowinds
- 1981: The first modern suspended coaster, The Bat, at Kings Island
- 1982: The first coaster with five inversions, Viper at Six Flags Darien Lake
- 1983: The first and only bowtie element. Record-breaking lift hill requiring two lift chains, Dragon Mountain, at Marineland of Canada
- 1984: The first successful suspended coaster, XLR-8 at Six Flags Astroworld and Big Bad Wolf at Busch Gardens Williamsburg
- 1987: The first coaster with six inversions, Vortex at Kings Island
- 1988: The first coaster with seven inversions, Shockwave at Six Flags Great America
- 1989: The first hypercoaster, Magnum XL-200 at Cedar Point
- 1990: The first suspended coaster to go underground, Vampire at Chessington World of Adventures
- 1991: The first looping coaster to feature an underwater tunnel, Anaconda at Kings Dominion
- 1991: The world's fastest roller coaster, Steel Phantom, opened at Kennywood
- 1993: The first roller coaster to feature three consecutive corkscrews, Fantasia Special at Fantasia
- 1994: World's tallest and steepest coaster, The Big One at Blackpool Pleasure Beach in Great Britain
- 2002: Designed the steel supporting structure for the Olympic Cauldron used at the 2002 Winter Olympic Games in Salt Lake City
- 2002: The first fourth-dimension coaster, X, at Six Flags Magic Mountain

== See also ==
- List of Arrow Dynamics rides
- HUSS Park Attractions
