= Corkscrew (Cedar Point) =

Steel roller coaster at Cedar Point

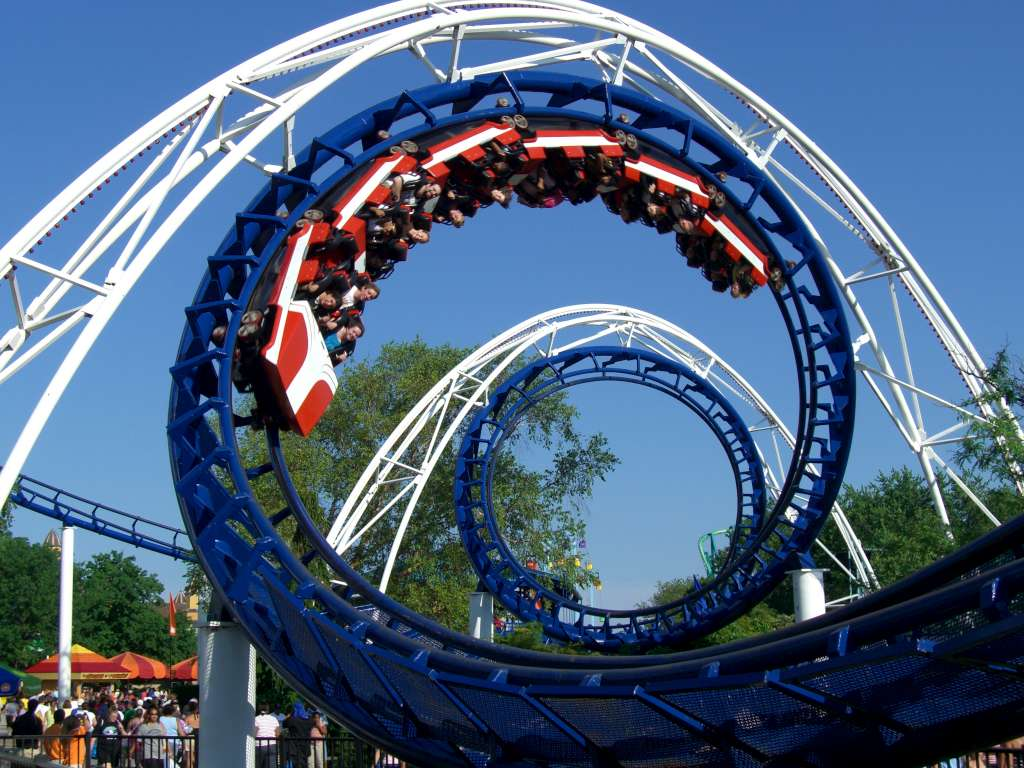
- The final inversion on Corkscrew

Cedar Point
- Location: Cedar Point
- Park section: Gemini Midway
- Coordinates: 41°29′1″N 82°41′7.25″W
- Status: Operating
- Opening date: May 15, 1976
- Cost: $1.75 million

General statistics
- Type: Steel
- Manufacturer: Arrow Development
- Designer: Ron Toomer
- Model: Custom Looping Coaster
- Track layout: Out and back
- Height: 85 ft (26 m)
- Drop: 65 ft (20 m)
- Length: 2,050 ft (620 m)
- Speed: 48 mph (77 km/h)
- Inversions: 3
- Duration: 2:00
- Max vertical angle: 45°
- Capacity: 1,800 riders per hour
- Height restriction: 48 in (122 cm)
- Trains: 2 trains with 6 cars; riders arranged 2 across in 2 rows for a total of 24 riders per train
- Fast Lane available
- Corkscrew at RCDB

Corkscrew is a steel roller coaster located at Cedar Point in Sandusky, Ohio, United States. Built by Arrow Development and designed by Ron Toomer, it opened to the public on May 15, 1976. The coaster was the first roller coaster in the world with three inversions.

== History ==
Corkscrew was originally announced in 1975 as The Great Lake Erie Roller, a name designed to tie in with the nearby Lake Erie, the action of rolling, and "roller coaster". The name was partly based on The Great American Scream Machine at Six Flags Over Georgia. The coaster would be manufactured by Arrow Development at a cost of $1.75 million (equivalent to $10.47 million in 2025) as part of a $4.5 million (equivalent to $26.92 million in 2025) investment into the park for 1976. Included in the cost was the coaster itself, a new 1,000 feet (300 m) midway for the coaster to pass over, and a Troika ride.

Before the ride's opening, The Great Lake Erie Roller was renamed to Corkscrew due to requests from board members. The ride opened as Corkscrew on May 15, 1976. The coaster opened as the first in the world to feature three inversions – a vertical loop and a double corkscrew.

== Characteristics ==
=== Location ===
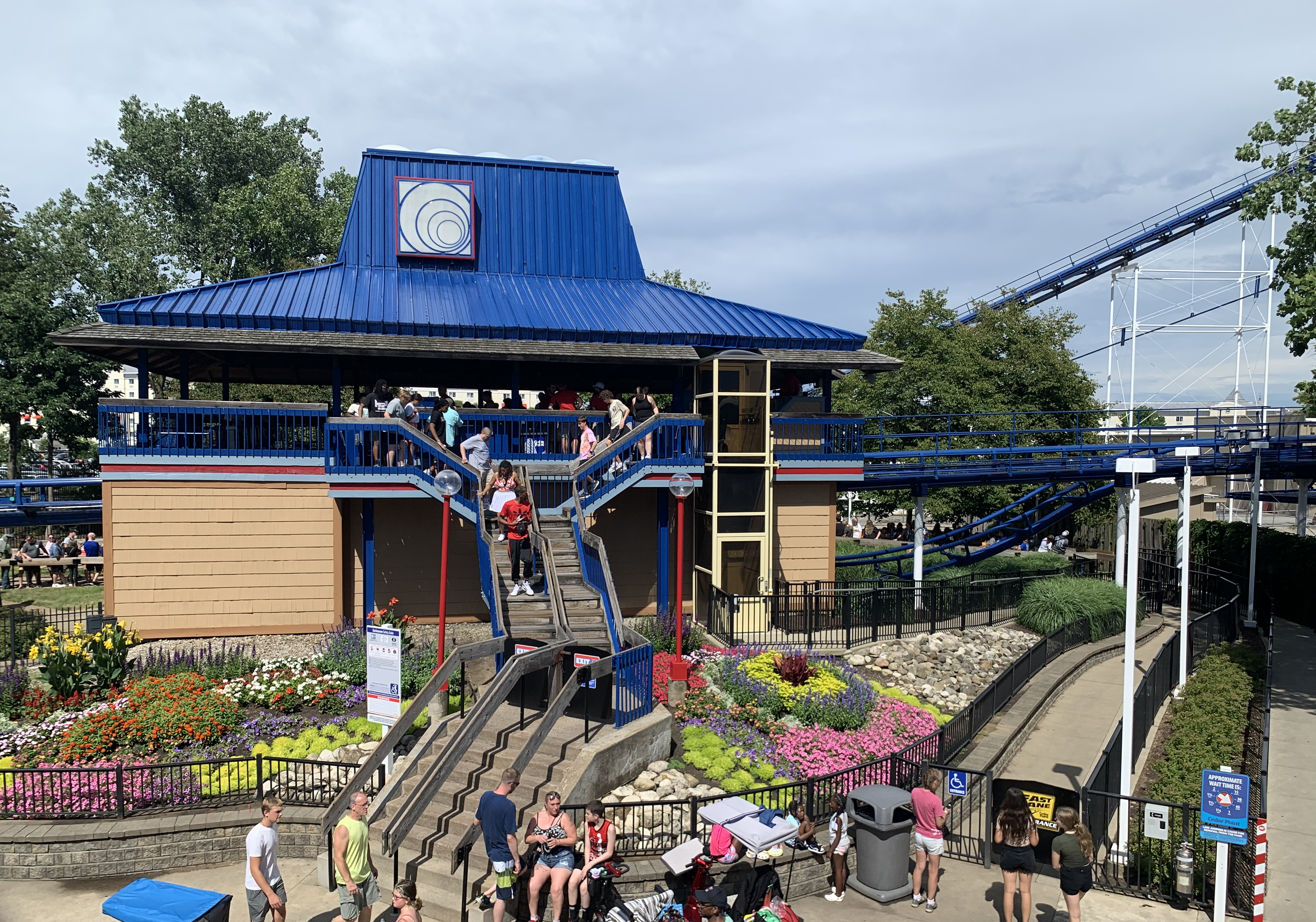
Corkscrew's station building (2022)

The ride's station is located on the Top Thrill 2 midway next to Super Himalaya and near Power Tower. It was the first coaster to have inversions featuring a walkway underneath.

=== Trains ===
Corkscrew originally had three 24-passenger trains painted red, white, and blue, a color scheme inspired by the U.S. Bicentennial in 1976, the year the ride was introduced. Riders are restrained by over-the-shoulder restraints with interlocking seat belts and are required to be 48 inches (120 cm) to ride. Unlike more modern coasters, the restraints in every car cannot be unlocked all at once. Pedals are hinged on the backs of each car, which must be manually released and locked individually by ride operators on the platform.

== Ride experience ==
=== Layout ===
The train exits the station when the ride operator releases the pneumatic station brakes. The train reaches a slight decline that allows the car to roll out and around a 180-degree turnaround and ascends the 30-degree and 85-foot (26 m) chain lift hill, operating at a speed of 4 mph (6.4 km/h). The train then descends 65 feet (20 m) at a 45-degree angle at a top speed of 48 mph (77 km/h). The train enters a bunny hop, drops lower than the main drop, and enters a vertical loop. The train goes up to a short straightaway before descending a banked 180-degree right turn into the two consecutive corkscrews over the midway of the park, traveling at 38 mph (61 km/h). In its final stretch, the train enters a slight ascending right turn followed by a shallow left turn, and then it reaches the brake run before returning to the station.

=== Track ===
The ride is 2,050 feet (620 m) long, consisting of blue tubular steel track with a 48-inch (1,200 mm) separation between tubes, built on 5 acres (20,000 m^{2}). It takes 1 minute and 40 seconds to complete the course, and the coaster operates three 24-passenger trains. One of the trains is transferred off the track once wait times in the line queue is adequately served by two-train operation. The ride was designed by Ron Toomer and built by Arrow Dynamics. The total cost of construction was US$1,750,000 (equivalent to $9,901,316 in 2025), and the ride has accommodated over 30 million riders since its opening in 1976.

== Records ==
Corkscrew in motion

1. First roller coaster to invert 3 times
2. First roller coaster to go over a midway

Preceded by Loopingbahn	Most Inversions on a Roller Coaster; May 1976–March 1980	Succeeded by Carolina Cyclone

== Incidents ==
- On August 25, 1981, two people were injured when one of the cars on a train suddenly disengaged.
- On August 29, 1999, the chain lift used on the ride broke causing riders to be stranded on one of the coaster's cars. Four riders were taken to the park's first aid station as a precaution, but none of the riders were seriously injured.
- In June 2005, the shoulder restraints unlocked on the ride. Nobody was injured, but the ride was closed to allow seatbelts to be installed between the shoulder harness and seat.
