= Loch Ness Monster (roller coaster) =

Steel roller coaster at Busch Gardens Williamsburg

- Loch Ness Monster in July 2001

Busch Gardens Williamsburg
- Location: Busch Gardens Williamsburg
- Park section: Scotland
- Coordinates: 37°14′03″N 76°38′46″W
- Status: Operating
- Opening date: June 2, 1978
- Cost: USD$5 million ($24.7 million in 2025 dollars)

General statistics
- Type: Steel
- Manufacturer: Arrow Development
- Designer: Ron Toomer
- Model: Custom Looping Coaster
- Track layout: Terrain
- Lift/launch system: Two chain lift hills
- Height: 130 ft (40 m)
- Drop: 114.2 ft (34.8 m)
- Length: 3,240 ft (990 m)
- Speed: 60 mph (97 km/h)
- Inversions: 2
- Duration: 2:10
- Max vertical angle: 55°
- G-force: 3.5
- Restraint style: Over-the-shoulder
- Trains: 3 trains with 7 cars; riders arranged 2 across in 2 rows for a total of 28 riders per train
- Theme: Loch Ness Monster
- Loch Ness Monster at RCDB

Video

Loch Ness Monster is a steel roller coaster located at Busch Gardens Williamsburg in Williamsburg, Virginia. Manufactured by Arrow Development and designed by Ron Toomer, it was the first roller coaster in the world to feature interlocking loops. The roller coaster was opened within the park's Scottish hamlet, Heatherdowns, on June 2, 1978, and relates to the legend of the Loch Ness Monster. The roller coaster reaches a maximum height of 130 ft (40 m), with a maximum speed of 60 mph (97 km/h), and a total track length of 3,240 ft (990 m).

The Loch Ness Monster is the only remaining roller coaster in the world with interlocking loops. In addition to the interlocking loops, located over one of the park's water features, the design includes a helix tunnel, two lift hills, and a 114.2 ft (34.8 m) drop. Upon opening, the Loch Ness Monster received generally positive reviews. The park has commemorated numerous anniversaries for the Loch Ness Monster and was designated as a Coaster Landmark by American Coaster Enthusiasts.

== History ==
Busch Gardens: The Old Country theme park in Williamsburg, Virginia, opened in 1975 with one roller coaster, Glissade. With the opening of the park's Oktoberfest section the next year, two roller coasters were added: Das Kätzchen, a children's coaster, and its adult counterpart, Die Wildkatze. As part of its strategy to add an attraction every other year, Anheuser-Busch announced the Loch Ness Monster on July 27, 1977. The thrill ride would be added at Williamsburg Busch Gardens in 1978 and would be the largest ride at the park upon its opening. The ride would be located in the center of the park in the Scotland-themed area and cost around $5 million. The announcement followed expansion plans for the Anheuser-Busch brewery in Williamsburg, as well as similar thrill additions being announced at other theme parks, including its sister park in Tampa, Florida.

Permits for the roller coaster's foundations and several Anheuser-Busch projects were approved in August by the James City County. In anticipation for the new additions, Busch Gardens Williamsburg would increase ticket prices in November. A groundbreaking ceremony was held and construction started in December. Supplemental construction permits were approved by the county in January 1978 for the roller coaster. Construction of the roller coaster was conducted during the winter months, which slowed progress, and was kept relatively hidden to build public anticipation. The Loch Ness Monster was physically revealed to the press on March 2. With the roller coaster nearing completion, the opening date was announced for June. The park's general manager, John Roberts, touted the roller coaster as being the fastest and tallest, and having the steepest drop in the world. The roller coaster would also debut with interlocking loops and a tunnel.

The roller coaster was topped off on April 13, 1978, with final welding, construction of the tunnel, and landscaping to be completed. As part of a marketing ploy, the park searched for eight people to be the first riders to take on the Loch Ness Monster. The eight people represented to take on the roller coaster were athletes in American football, NASCAR racing, ice hockey, and stunt personnel. The Loch Ness Monster opened to the public on June 2. A week later on June 9, the park hosted the inaugural American Coaster Enthusiasts (ACE) convention, partially surrounding the roller coaster's opening. The roller coaster was christened on June 19, by Alex Campbell, an individual claimed to have seen the Loch Ness Monster.

Following a month of rumors in September 2023, Busch Gardens Williamsburg announced the Loch Ness Monster would undertake a renovation for the 2024 season. Throughout the remainder of the 2023 season, sections of the track were replaced while a shade covering was added over the final brake run and various sections of track were repainted. The ride reopened on May 10, 2024 with new audio tracks added to the lift hills and lighting effects in the tunnel, while an all-new sighting center opened April 4-21 as a walkthrough attraction highlighting milestones and archived photographs of the attraction.

== Ride experience ==
The train departs the station and makes a slight left turn. It then makes a sharp right turnaround, passing a boat shack with an old ride vehicle, and starts its climb up the 130 ft (40 m) first lift hill. Cresting the lift hill, the train makes a right turn, and descends 114.2 ft (34.8 m) toward the park's Rhine River at its maximum angle of 55 degrees and reaches its maximum speed of 60 mph (97 km/h). The train climbs a large upward hill and turns left before it briefly ascends, then drops into the first of the two interlocking vertical loops. This loop is followed by a right turn and uphill ascent into the mid-course brake run, followed by a descending, spiraling tunnel. Within the tunnel, the train traverses a helix, making 2.75 rotations. When the train exits the tunnel, it climbs a bunny hill, hits a short brake run, and then climbs a second lift hill. Cresting the hill, the train turns right before descending into the second loop. After completing the loop, the train passes by a statue of the Loch Ness Monster appearing to lunge at riders as it rises up into the final brake run, before returning to the station. One cycle of the ride takes about two minutes and ten seconds to complete.

== Characteristics ==
The roller coaster's namesake comes from the fabled creature of the Loch Ness Monster, appropriately situated in the Scotland area of the park. The queue area of the roller coaster features items of an expedition in search of the Loch Ness Monster. The tunnel portion is labeled the "Monster's Lair", where the Loch Ness Monster lives in a hollowed-out mountain. Special effects were added for the roller coaster's tunnel in 1979, incorporating a mural of the creature with mist and lights. The lighting effect was reintegrated with sound effects in the tunnel section during the 40th anniversary.

=== Track ===
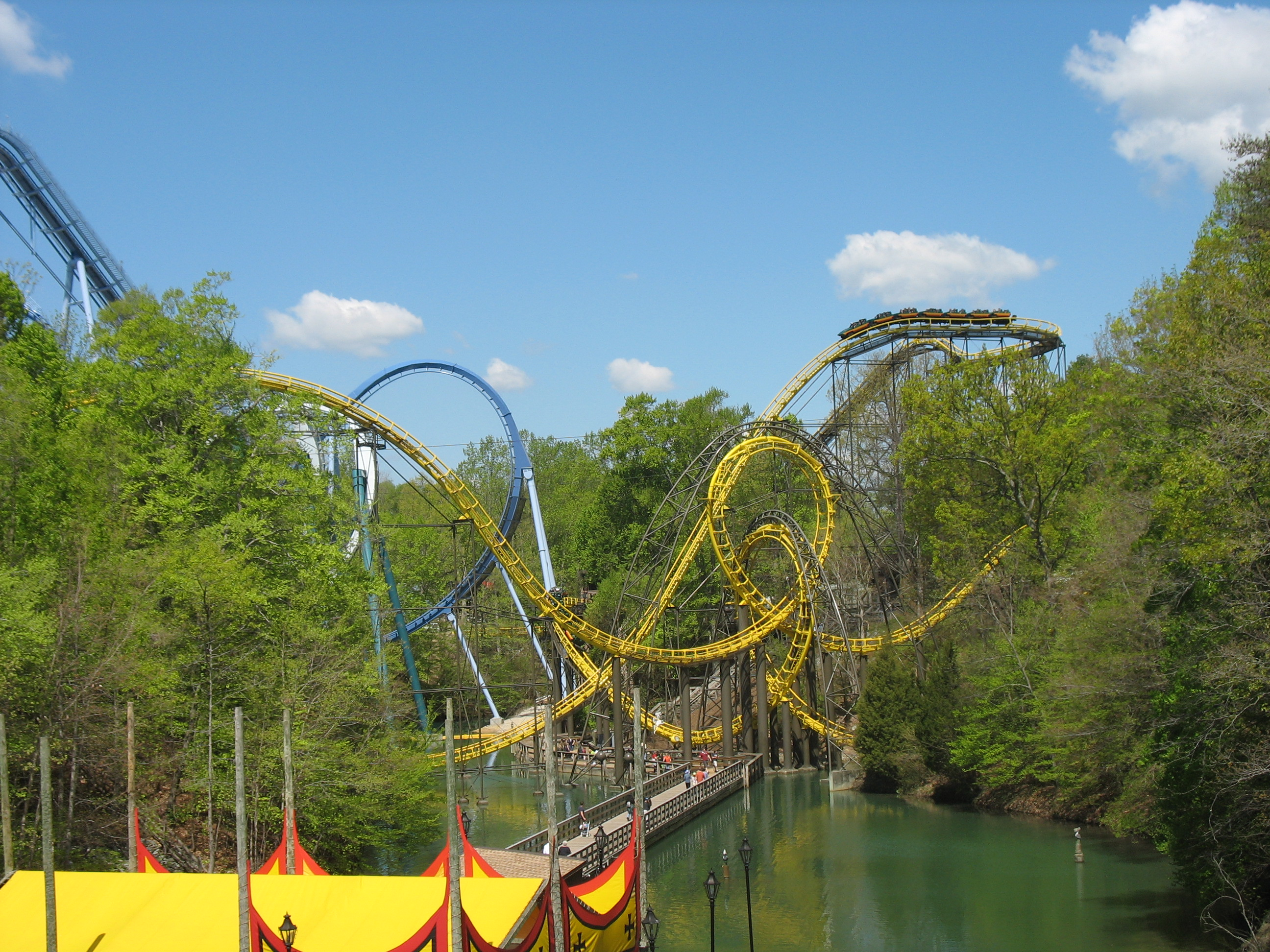
Interlocking loops of the Loch Ness Monster with Griffon and Alpengeist on the left

The Loch Ness Monster is a Custom Looping Coaster model made by Arrow Development and designed by Ron Toomer. The roller coaster is considered a terrain roller coaster as it utilizes the surrounding landscape in its elements. The steel track is 3,240 ft (990 m) long and is colored bright yellow. The track's highest point is approximately 130 feet (40 m) above the lake, while the lowest point is around 5 ft (1.5 m) above the lake. The maintenance workshop is beneath the ride's station.

The roller coaster used 300 tons of steel in its construction. The Loch Ness Monster, compared to contemporary roller coasters, had its steel framework welded together instead of bolted. During construction, a section of track leading from the bottom of the second loop to the brake run before the station was incorrectly formed, bending left, instead of right. Workers heated the track to physically bend it to the correct position, resulting in a sharp bump.

The loops have a diameter of 30 feet (9.1 m). When the ride first opened, trains entered each loop at 43 miles per hour (69 km/h), slowing to 23 miles per hour (37 km/h) at the top of each loop. The top of the first loop is 82 ft (25 m) high, while the top of the second loop is 57 ft (17 m) high. The Loch Ness Monster was the first to feature interlocking loops on a full circuit roller coaster and the only one still in operation. Two other roller coasters formerly featured interlocking loops: Lightnin' Loops at Six Flags Great Adventure and the Orient Express at Worlds of Fun.

=== Trains ===
The ride can operate with 3 trains, though the park only owns 2, with 7 cars per train. Each car is arranged in 2 seats across 2 rows, allowing a maximum capacity of 28 riders per train. The trains are colored green and situated inside the track using flat-surfaced wheels. The trains originally entered the interlocking loops simultaneously but were discontinued when safety mechanisms were updated. The roller coaster exerts a maximum of 3.5 g-forces to its riders and uses over-the-shoulder restraints.

The Loch Ness Monster was initially designed with 4 trains with 6 cars per train. The manufacturer realized that 4-train operations would result in backups throughout the ride and revised the layout to 3 trains with 7 cars per train. The trains were initially manually braked in the station. Parts of Arrow Development roller coaster Python, located at Busch Gardens Tampa and sister roller coaster to the Loch Ness Monster, were donated to the park after the former's closure. The original train set was replaced with S&S Worldwide rolling stock. The Loch Ness Monster could carry 2,000 passengers per hour when it opened.

== Incidents and accidents ==
An 11-year-old girl fell into a coma soon after riding the Loch Ness Monster on August 3, 1981, due to a pre-existing medical condition. The girl recovered that September.

A train carrying 25 passengers hit a downed tree on the roller coaster's track, sending 5 people to the hospital on June 13, 1989. The train carrying passengers was stranded on a section of track suspended 30 ft (9.1 m) above the ground; the ride's safety systems intervened to prevent a collision when an unoccupied second train stopped on the second lift hill. Rescue personnel evacuated all passengers over two hours. Four individuals injured were released a day later, with a 16-year-old retained at the hospital having suffered a leg injury. A subsequent $2 million lawsuit claimed a rider suffered internal injuries; the rider ultimately received $250,000.

In June 1992, 2 riders claimed the special misting water effect at the ride's tunnel entrance was caustic and temporarily blinding, causing emotional distress. A park public relations manager testified the mist sprayed only water and had been subsequently removed, independent of the suit, for unknown reasons. The lawsuit was subsequently dismissed. (Note: Carol Sumner vs. Busch Entertainment Corp, Dismissed (Williamsburg/James City County Circuit Court 1992).)

== Reception and legacy ==
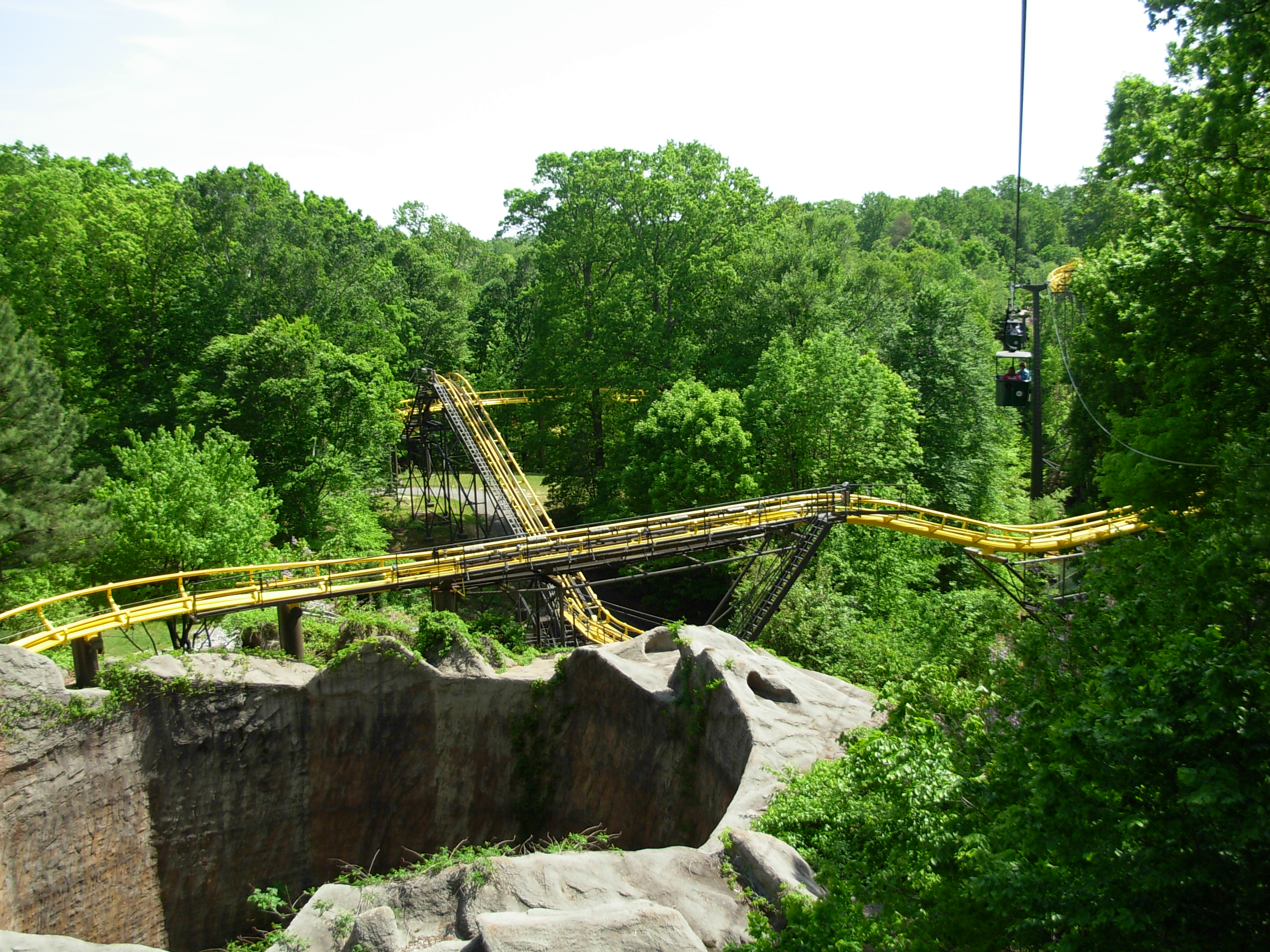
The midcourse brake run and second lift hill

Upon opening at the park, the Loch Ness Monster received generally positive reviews from critics and guests. A reporter for the Daily Press, Cindy Skove, covered guests' reaction to the roller coaster, with one group stating it was "one of the best", another stating they "only liked it 'generally'", while others excitedly cheered. Skove later remarked in another article the Loch Ness Monster was simply "fun", even though she disliked roller coasters. Reporter Susan Bruno of the Daily Press noted the reactions of the park's celebrity guests who were chosen to take on the roller coaster, with then-governor John N. Dalton stating he "enjoyed" the ride while George Willig thought it was "excellent" and wanted to ride it more.

During the first American Coaster Enthusiasts convention, members commented favorably on the overall experience of the ride. A writer for The State, Dan Perry, juxtaposed the first drop to the feeling of a "free fall off a 13-story building" and the sudden acceleration with fear. Perry concluded his ride experience wanting to ride again after "raising [his] hands high", facing his fears. Hank Burchard of The Washington Post wrote: "No coaster connoisseur will be able to hold up his head until he has ridden it. Then the problem becomes how to hold down lunch." In his review, Burchard said the Loch Ness Monster was in a different league of thrill rides.

After the opening of the Loch Ness Monster, Busch Gardens Williamsburg marked its earliest millionth visitor on July 22, 1978, since the park's opening in 1975. The park also reported a record 30,000 visitors on July 29, prompting the park to close early. By the season closure in October, the park saw a record 2.1 million visitors which was attributed to the opening of the roller coaster. The Loch Ness Monster helped the Williamsburg park to reach national recognition through the 1978 season, as well as compete against another Virginia amusement park, Kings Dominion. The initial Golden Ticket Awards in 1998 placed the Loch Ness Monster as the 15th best steel roller coaster, tied with Taz's Texas Tornado at Six Flags AstroWorld.

The park has commemorated several anniversaries for the Loch Ness Monster. The tenth anniversary saw 400 American Coaster Enthusiasts members celebrate the founding of ACE and the roller coaster. The park celebrated the 15th anniversary of the roller coaster with Elvis impersonators that parachuted into the park and rode the Loch Ness Monster. The roller coaster's 20th and 30th anniversaries' saw respective fundraising events for the Kiwanis Club and the Autism Society of America. The 40th anniversary was marked by upgrades to the roller coaster and a five day commemoration. Its popularity and historical significance as the world's first roller coaster with interlocking loops, as well as being the tallest and fastest coaster when it was built, was recognized by the American Coaster Enthusiasts organization, which designated Loch Ness Monster a Coaster Landmark on June 17, 2003. The National Roller Coaster Museum and Archives hosted an original Arrow Development train to its collection in 2021.

== See also ==
- Corkscrew (Valleyfair), another Custom Looping Coaster built by Arrow Development
- Double Loop (Geauga Lake), another Custom Looping Coaster built by Arrow Development
