= Roller coaster inversion =

Roller coaster element

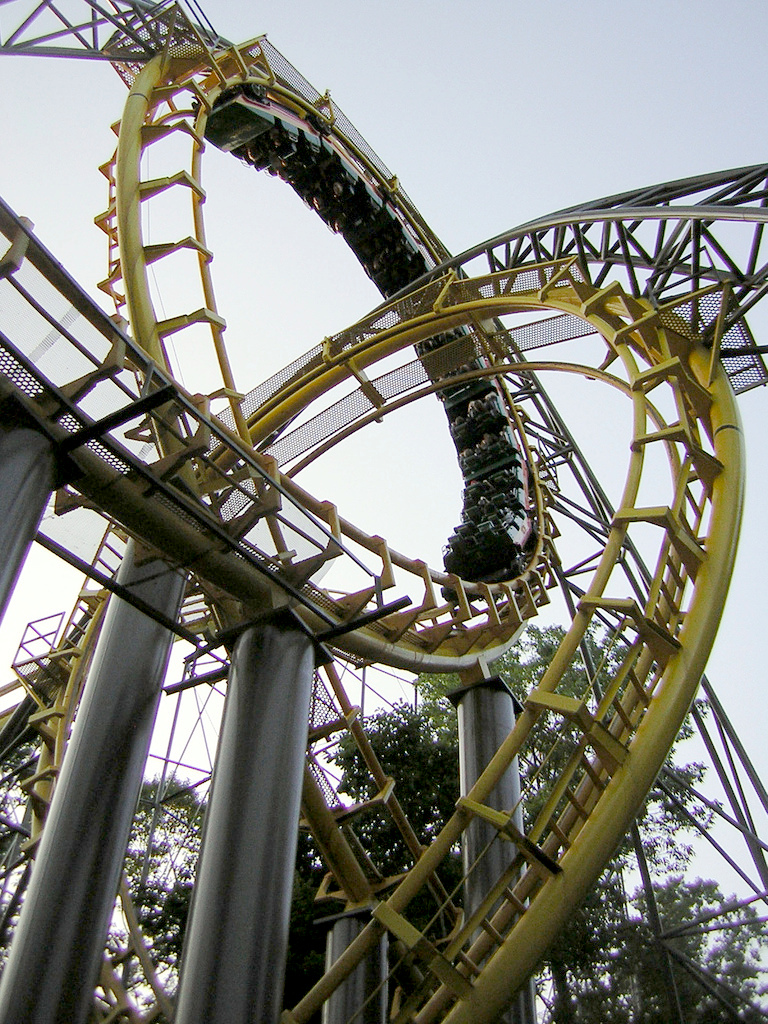
The famous interlocking loops on the Loch Ness Monster coaster at Busch Gardens Williamsburg

A roller coaster inversion is a roller coaster element in which the track turns riders upside-down and then returns them to an upright position. Early forms of inversions were circular in nature and date back to 1848 on the Centrifugal railway in Paris. These vertical loops produced massive g-force that was often dangerous to riders. As a result, the element eventually became non-existent with the last rides to feature the looping inversions being dismantled during the Great Depression. In 1975, designers from Arrow Development created the corkscrew, reviving interest in the inversion during the modern age of steel roller coasters. Elements have since evolved from simple corkscrews and vertical loops to more complex inversions such as Immelmann loops and cobra rolls. The Smiler at Alton Towers holds the world record for the number of inversions on a roller coaster with 14.

== History ==
=== Prototypes (1848–1903) ===
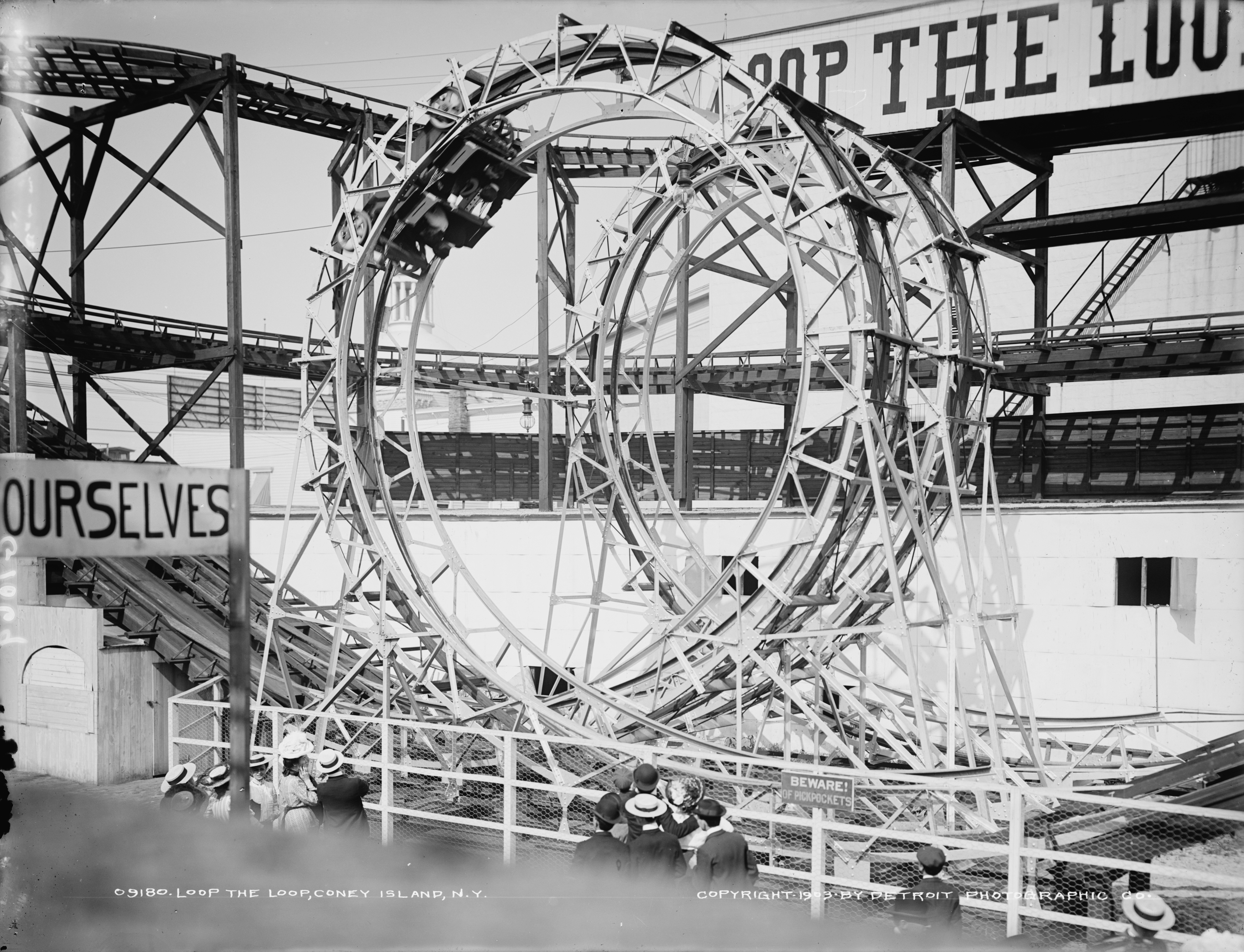
Loop the Loop (1903), at Coney Island, one of the first oval-looping coasters

The first inversion in roller coaster history was part of the Centrifugal Railway of Paris, France, built in 1848. It consisted of a 13-meter (43-foot) sloping track leading into a nearly circular vertical loop 4 metres (13 ft) in diameter. During the early 1900s, many rides including vertical loops appeared around the world. These early loops had a major design flaw: the circular structure produced intense g-forces. The Flip Flap Railway, designed by Lina Beecher and built in 1895 on Coney Island of Brooklyn, United States, had a 7.6-meter (25-foot) circular loop at the end which though initially popular caused some discomfort in passenger's necks, and the ride soon closed. Loop the Loop, another looping coaster, was built later in Coney Island as well. This time the loops were slightly oval-shaped rather than circular, though not clothoid in shape like modern loops. Although the ride was safe, it had a low capacity, loading four people every five minutes (48 people per hour, compared to 1800 riders per hour on Corkscrew, an early modern coaster that opened in 1976), and was poorly received after the discomfort of the Flip Flap Railway. As their novelty wore off and their dangerous reputation spread, compounded with the developing Great Depression, the early looping coasters disappeared.

=== Corkscrew (1968–1976) ===
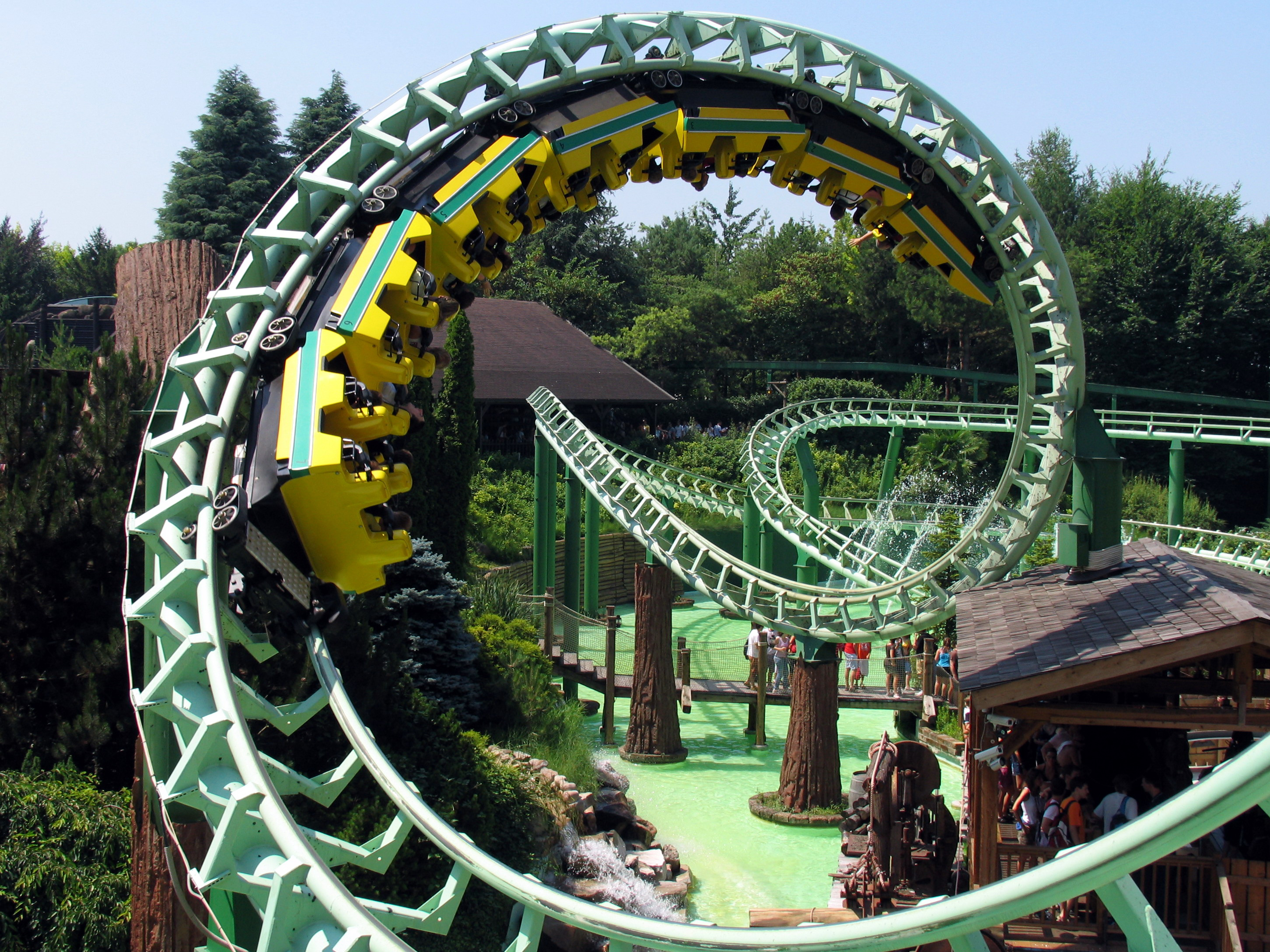
Corkscrews on the Magic Mountain roller coaster (1985) at Gardaland in Italy

The concept of inverting riders was not revisited until the 1970s. In 1968, Karl Bacon of Arrow Dynamics created a prototype steel roller coaster with a corkscrew, the first of its kind. The prototype proved that a tubular steel track, first pioneered by Arrow to create Disneyland's Matterhorn Bobsleds in 1959, could execute inversions both safely and reliably. The full model of the prototype, aptly named Corkscrew, was then installed in Knott's Berry Farm in Buena Park, United States, making history as the world's first modern inverting roller coaster (it was relocated to Silverwood Park of Idaho in 1990). In 1976, the previously disastrous vertical loop was successfully revived when Anton Schwarzkopf constructed the Great American Revolution at Six Flags Magic Mountain of Valencia, United States, which became the world's first complete circuit looping roller coaster. Another roller coaster named Corkscrew, built in Cedar Point of Ohio in the same year, became the first with three inversions.

=== Inversions (1977–present) ===
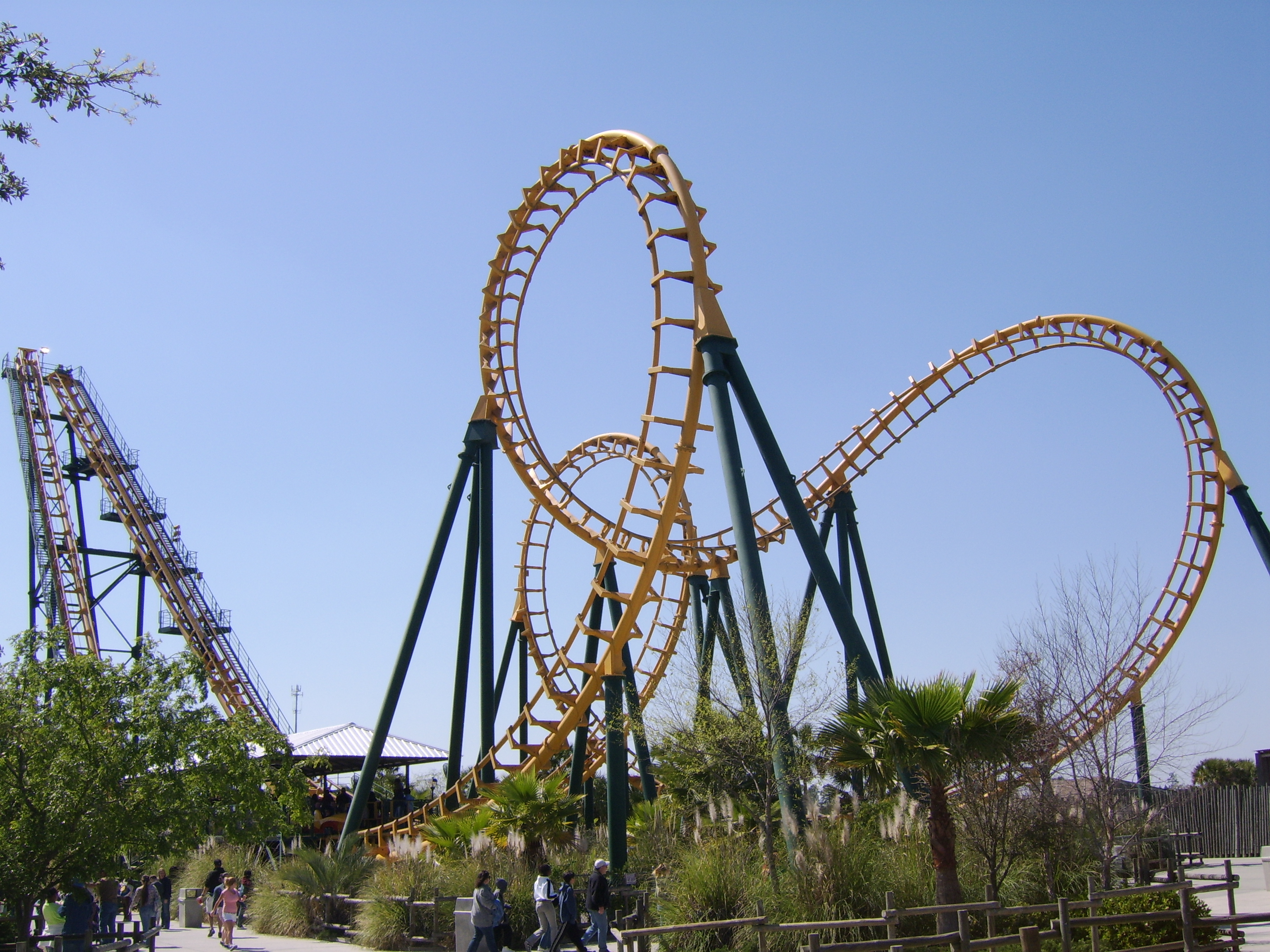
Boomerang has been cloned over 50 times and is the most duplicated roller coaster ever.

The next few years brought innovations that are still popular in modern coasters. The shuttle roller coaster (non-complete circuit) was invented by Schwarzkopf in 1977 and realized at Kings Island with the Screamin' Demon coaster. These early incarnations used the weight-drop mechanism (as opposed to the later flywheel methods) to launch the trains. Built in 1978, the Loch Ness Monster in Busch Gardens Williamsburg became the first coaster with interlocking loops. It is still the only coaster with this feature, as the only other coasters containing interlocking loops are now defunct: Lightnin' Loops, built by Arrow in Six Flags Great Adventure, was sold in 1992, and Orient Express of Worlds of Fun was demolished in 2003. The first Schwarzkopf shuttle loops with a flywheel launch also first appeared in 1978. Arrow's Revolution, Europe's first looping coaster, was built in 1979 at Blackpool Pleasure Beach of England. In 1980, Carolina Cyclone opened at Carowinds as the first roller coaster with four inversions. The Orient Express opened at Worlds of Fun of Kansas City, United States, in 1980, with the newly invented batwing (not to be confused with a boomerang), a single track element with two inversions.

In 1981, Vekoma invented the Boomerang coaster model, which became the most duplicated roller coaster ever. The first Boomerang was built at Reino Aventura (now Six Flags México) of Mexico City, Mexico in 1982. The Boomerang has had over 50 clones built worldwide from Doha, Qatar, to Tashkent, Uzbekistan. 1982 also brought the first five-inversion coaster, Arrow's Viper at Darien Lake in Darien, New York.

The record for number of inversions was broken quickly in the following years. Arrow's Vortex at Kings Island, built in 1987, was the first to have six. The next year, Shockwave at Six Flags Great America broke that record with seven inversions. In 1995, Dragon Khan in Spain's Port Aventura became the first to have eight. In 2002, Colossus at Thorpe Park in Chertsey, Surrey, England was the first with ten. In 2013, The Smiler at Alton Towers in Staffordshire, England, broke the record again with 14 inversions.

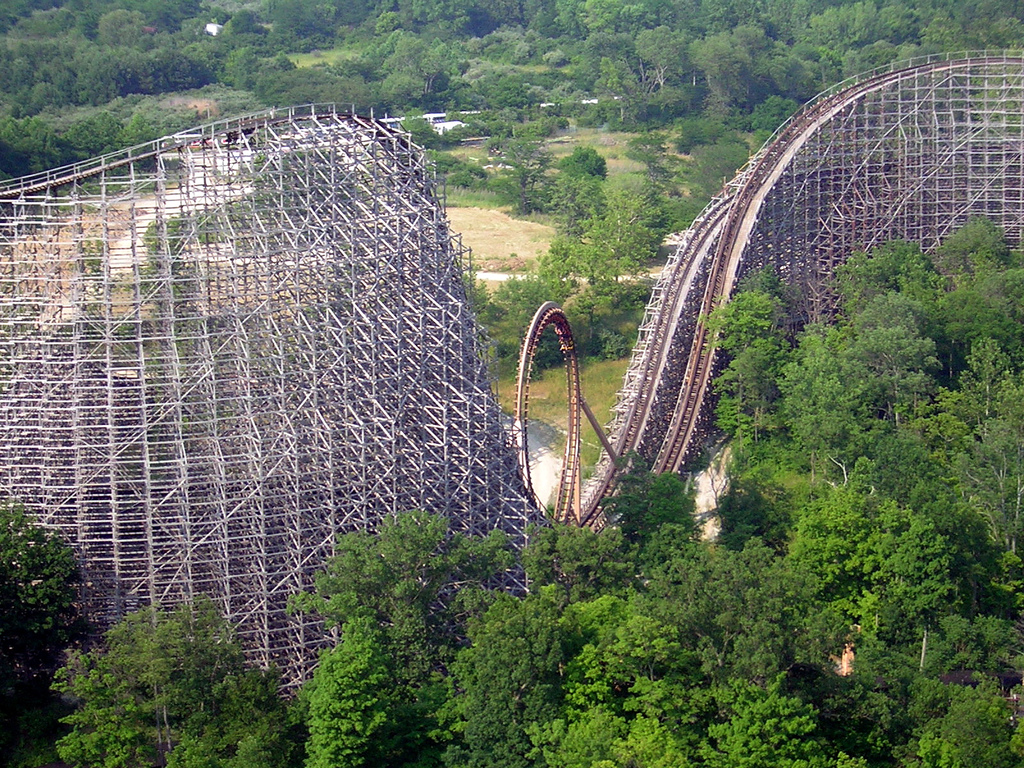
Son of Beast (2000) at Kings Island, the first wooden roller coaster to have an inversion

In 2000, Kings Island built Son of Beast, the world's first wooden roller coaster with a vertical loop. Until then, all roller coasters with any inversions were steel. After structural problems caused an incident in July 2006 that injured several riders, Son of Beast's loop was removed in December 2006 to make it possible to use lighter trains.

In 2002, X, now X2, designed by Arrow, opened in Six Flags Magic Mountain. It is marketed as the world's first fourth-dimension roller coaster, capable of rotating riders upside-down independently of any track elements. This adds difficulty in delineating the number of inversions such rides have. As the riders physically rotate 360 degrees forward and backwards, proponents insist the number of inversions should not include only track elements. According to Guinness World Records, the roller coaster with the most inversions counted this way is Eejanaika (Japanese: ええじゃないか, Ain't it great?), another 4th Dimension roller coaster, in Fuji-Q Highland of Fujiyoshida, Japan, which rotates riders 14 times. Counting only track elements, however, Alton Tower's The Smiler has the world record for number of inversions, also rotating riders 14 times.

Two or more wooden roller coasters with inversions opened in each of 2013, 2014, and 2017. As opposed to the vertical loop that Son of Beast had, Outlaw Run and Hades 360, Mine Blower and Goliath (at Six Flags Great America) have more complex inversions. Outlaw Run at Silver Dollar City has a double barrel roll and a 153° over-banked turn, and Hades 360 has a single corkscrew. Other elements which partially invert riders, such as the overbanked turn which occasionally turn riders beyond 90 degrees, are not typically considered inversions.

== See also ==
- Roller coaster elements – includes a list of inversions
- List of roller coaster inversion records
