= Great American Scream Machine (Six Flags Great Adventure) =

Defunct steel roller coaster

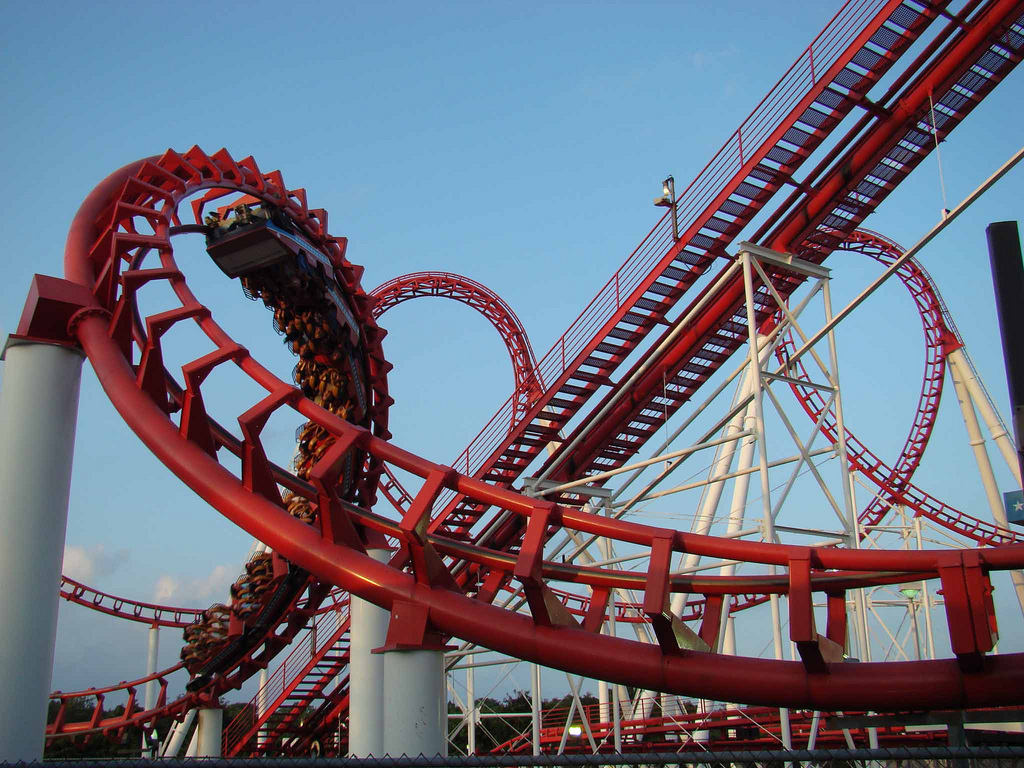
- Great American Scream Machine's train entering the first of two corkscrews.

Six Flags Great Adventure
- Location: Six Flags Great Adventure
- Park section: Boardwalk
- Coordinates: 40°08′20.73″N 74°26′17.07″W
- Status: Removed
- Opening date: April 15, 1989
- Closing date: July 18, 2010
- Cost: $7 million
- Replaced: Sarajevo Bobsled
- Replaced by: Green Lantern

General statistics
- Type: Steel
- Manufacturer: Arrow Dynamics
- Designer: Arrow Dynamics
- Model: Custom Looping Coaster
- Track layout: Twister
- Lift/launch system: Chain lift hill
- Height: 173 ft (53 m)
- Drop: 155 ft (47 m)
- Length: 3,800 ft (1,200 m)
- Speed: 68 mph (109 km/h)
- Inversions: 7
- Duration: 2:20
- Capacity: 1680 riders per hour
- G-force: 3.8
- Height restriction: 54 in (137 cm)
- Great American Scream Machine at RCDB

Great American Scream Machine was a steel roller coaster located at Six Flags Great Adventure in Jackson Township, New Jersey. The 173-foot-tall (53 m) ride opened in 1989 as the tallest and fastest looping roller coaster in the world, reaching a maximum speed of 68 mph (109 km/h). It was designed by Ron Toomer and manufactured by Arrow Dynamics, which built two other coasters with similar layouts – Shockwave at Six Flags Great America and Viper at Six Flags Magic Mountain. Great American Scream Machine featured seven inversions including a batwing and double corkscrew. Records set by the ride were succeeded by Viper the following year in 1990. It operated until July 2010 and was replaced by a stand-up roller coaster, Green Lantern, in 2011. Green Lantern closed on November 10, 2024.

== History ==
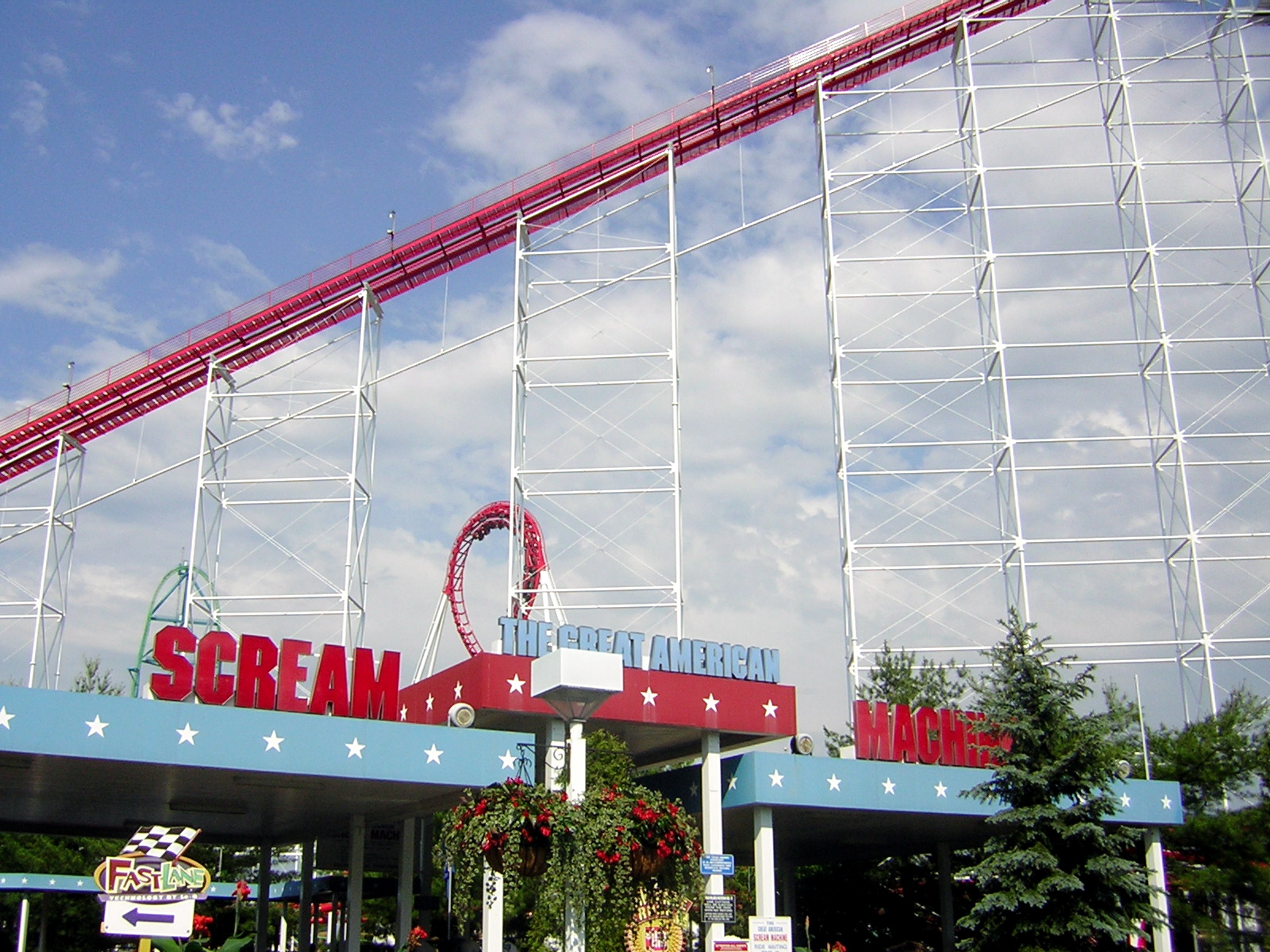
The entrance sign.

The coaster was originally going to be named Ninja, but there were problems with the crowds drawn to the Ninja coasters in other parks. Instead, the name Great American Scream Machine was selected. Great American Scream Machine was announced in September 1988. It opened to the public on April 15, 1989.

The coaster track was painted red and the supports were white. The trains were named Freedom (red), Liberty (white) and Spirit (blue). The ground underneath the ride featured a red and white design resembling the stripes on a waving American flag. The maximum capacity of the ride was 1,680 guests per hour.

The over-the-shoulder restraint handles were made of foam instead of metal. The Scream Machine's on-ride camera was located at the curve before entering the double corkscrew, unlike those of its sister coasters; the cameras on both rides were located at the bottom of the Boomerang.

=== Modifications ===
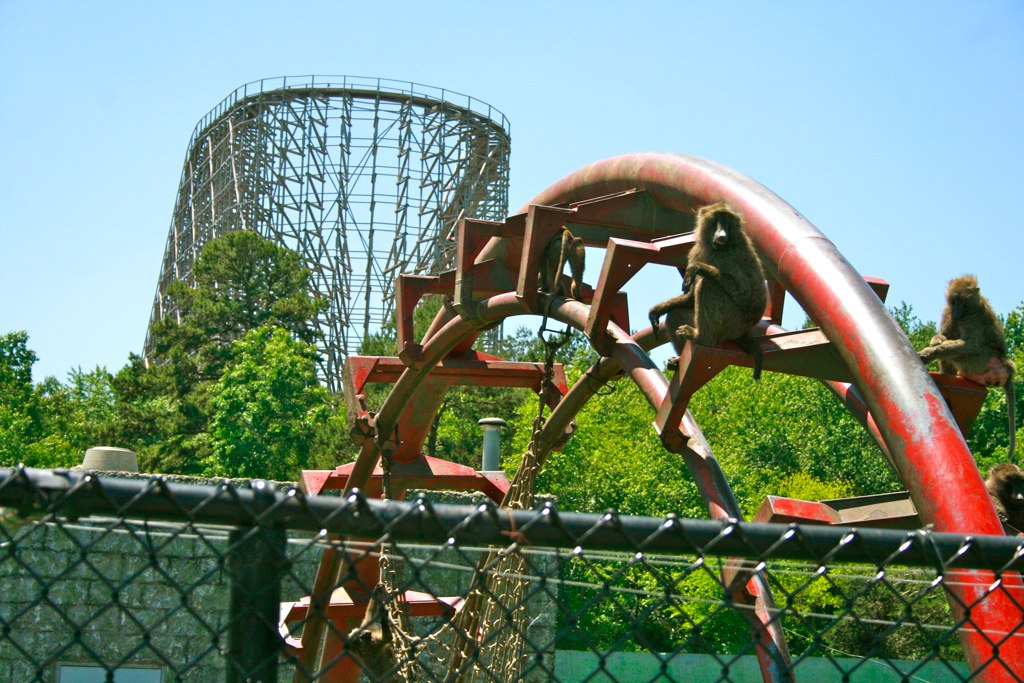
The top of the former loop in the baboon enclosure.

During the 1992–93 off-season, the top of the vertical loops were removed and replaced by track with additional strength bracing. This was due to issues with other Arrow coasters, including Shockwave at Six Flags Great America. The top of the original first loop can be found in the baboons' enclosure in the Wild Safari at Six Flags Great Adventure. Along with the new loop tops, a trim brake was installed after the first loop. The modifications were used to slightly adjust the speed of the train and to alleviate the stress to the ride's structure and trains.

In 2005, The Great American Scream Machine and Batman & Robin: The Chiller were repainted.

In 2009, the Liberty (white) train was ad-wrapped as an advertisement for one of the ride's sponsors, got2b Glued Styling Spiking Glue, a hair gel. Assorted signs were also placed on the station platform advertising. It was the first train in the park to feature advertisements, but as this idea spread throughout the Six Flags chain, it was joined by Kingda Ka and El Toro, whose trains featured The Karate Kid and Stride Gum ads, respectively.

In the 2010 operating season, guests noticed that the Liberty (white) train was adwrapped as an advertisement for another ride sponsor, Axe, a grooming product for young males. Signs for the product could be found around the rides entrance.

=== Removal ===
During the 2010 season, speculation that Great American Scream Machine was being removed at the end of the season began circulating on message boards, pegging June 30, 2010, as a possible last day of operation. None of the rumors initially were confirmed nor denied until July 1, 2010, when a staff member stated that the coaster was not being removed. In a contradicting statement released on July 5, 2010, Six Flags Great Adventure informally announced the coaster's permanent closure would occur on July 18, 2010, in order to clear space for a new attraction in 2011. The announcement was officially confirmed on the park's website a few days later.

As announced, the ride's last operating day was on July 18, 2010. Deconstruction began soon after, and signs teasing the construction of its replacement were posted. A first look at the outline of the new ride replacing the Scream Machine was revealed on August 6, 2010. Six Flags requested permission from Jackson Township to remove parking spaces from the area behind Superman: Ultimate Flight to accommodate the ride's construction. On September 15, 2010, Six Flags unveiled the new ride as Green Lantern, a stand-up roller coaster relocated from then known as Six Flags Kentucky Kingdom, where it originally operated as Chang. It would be re-themed to the DC Comics Green Lantern superhero.

Following the demolition, only Viper at Six Flags Magic Mountain remained from the original three Arrow installations involving their custom, 7-inversion design. The other one, Shockwave at Six Flags Great America, was demolished in 2002.

== Ride experience ==
After departing the station, the train crossed a transfer track and traveled down a small dip, then completed a 180-degree turn to the left onto the lift hill. After a 173-foot (53 m) climb, the train dropped 155 feet (47 m) to the left, reaching a top speed of 68 mph (109 km/h). The train then traveled through its first inversion, a 136 foot tall, single vertical loop. After exiting the loop, the train turned to the left and traveled through a double-loop, the first loop being 107 feet tall and the second loop being 97 feet tall. The train then traveled upward with a left turn onto the mid-course brake run. The train came to a complete stop for 2 seconds. The train then dropped down into a boomerang element. After the boomerang, the train made a right turn, where riders' pictures are taken. The train then proceeded to enter the double corkscrew, then completed a 180-degree turn to the left onto the final brake run back into the station.

== See also ==
- Viper (Six Flags Magic Mountain), Great American Scream Machine's sister coaster
- Shockwave (Six Flags Great America) Great American Scream Machine's defunct sister coaster

Preceded by Shockwave	World's Tallest Complete-Circuit Roller Coaster; April 1989–May 1989	Succeeded by Magnum XL-200
