= RGX =

Body spray

RGX was a body spray owned by Dial Corporation and launched in January 2007. The product was an attempt by Dial to break into the body spray market, currently dominated by AXE and Tag, through a marketing strategy directed at older men. RGX employed the Internet to create buzz via a men's lifestyle website called RGX Life, followed by television, print, and public relations activities. Television and online banners feature actress Rachel Specter. In 2009, the body spray line was discontinued.

== Fragrances ==
RGX had six fragrance variants:

- CHILL
- RUSH
- SURGE
- REFRESH
- ICED
- PURE 50
