= Fragrantica =

Online perfume database and community

- Website type: Perfume database and online community
- Available in: Multilingual
- Founders: Zoran Knezevic; Elena Knezevic
- Editor: Elena Knezevic
- Website: www.fragrantica.com
- Launched: 2007; 19 years ago
- Current status: Active

Fragrantica is an online perfume database and community founded in 2007. The site catalogues the composition and release details of tens of thousands of fragrances and hosts user-written reviews and ratings, and has been described as the de facto internet archive of perfume. By 2024 it listed more than 95,000 perfumes and had over a million registered users.

== History ==
Fragrantica was founded in 2007 by Zoran Knezevic and his wife Elena Knezevic, who serves as the site's editor-in-chief. Zoran Knezevic has said the project grew out of an interest in memetics, the study of how symbols and ideas spread, which he felt was missing from how fragrance was discussed.

== Content and features ==
Each fragrance on the site has an entry giving its house, year of release, perfumer and a note pyramid setting out its top, middle and base notes. Registered users add reviews and ratings, and vote on attributes including longevity, sillage, intended gender, price and the occasions a scent suits.

The site's visual conventions have themselves become familiar to users. Knezevic told NewBeauty that the note icons carry unusual weight with the readership: "When we change the icon for sandalwood, the whole internet revolts because we've disturbed their visual map."

== Review culture ==
Fragrantica's user reviews have attracted attention for their distinctive register. Writing in Dazed, Elena Lazic described the site as "an online perfume encyclopaedia" whose contributors largely abandon technical vocabulary in favour of confessional, poetic and at times absurdist writing, frequently tying a scent to personal memory, and noted that its comment threads can turn combative.

Glossy reported that part of the site's appeal for users lay in a "treasure-hunting element" that felt unlike algorithmically ordered social media platforms.
