= Christina Aguilera (disambiguation) =

Christina Aguilera (born 1980) is an American singer, songwriter, actress, and television personality.

Christina Aguilera may also refer to:

- Christina Aguilera (album), her self-titled 1999 debut studio album
- Simply Christina Aguilera, commonly referred to as Christina Aguilera, the 2007 debut fragrance from her perfume brand Christina Aguilera Fragrances

== See also ==
- Christina Aguilera Fragrances
- Christina Aguilera in Concert
- Christina Aguilera at Voltaire
- Christina Aguilar (born 1966), Thai singer
