= Body spray =

Perfume product

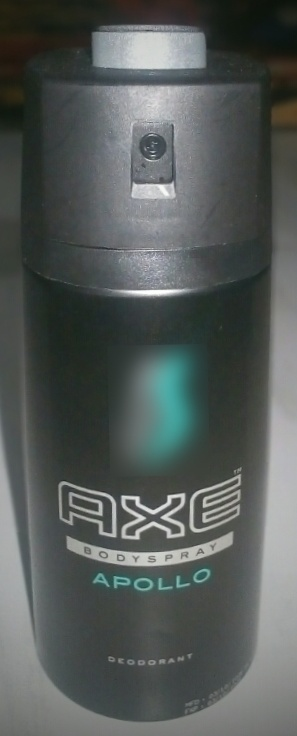
A body spray

Body spray is a perfume product, similar to aerosol deodorant, which is intended to be used elsewhere on the body besides the armpits. Body sprays are lighter in strength than cologne, generally less expensive, and double as deodorant.

== Common ingredients ==
Some common ingredients found in body spray include: butane, isobutane, propane, alcohol, parfum.

== Major brands ==
Some well known body spray brands include Unilever's "Axe" and "Impulse", Gillette's "Tag", Dial's "RGX", Procter & Gamble's "Old Spice".

== Smellmaxxing ==
Smellmaxxing is a term that uses the incelosphere-related suffix "-maxx" to describe a 2020s social-media-driven phenomenon which originated with pre-adolescent and adolescent males using fragrances to optimize their scent in a personalized manner.

=== History and background ===
The term and concept of smellmaxxing originated in online communities associated with looksmaxxing, where users discussed ways to improve physical attractiveness. The practice later expanded to focus specifically on fragrances, deodorants, body washes, and other scent-related grooming products, particularly among adolescent males on TikTok. It has since expanded as part of a broader shift in male grooming culture among younger generations.

The trend originated mainly in association with adolescent males. A stereotype that has persisted in the United States is teenage boys using Axe body spray as their primary fragrance. However, with the ubiquity of social media, the trend of smellmaxxing became prominent. As lower-end brands like Old Spice lost favor amongst Gen Z, more premium brands enjoyed a higher degree of popularity. Due to peer pressure in social arenas such as school, teenage boys conform to the trend.

=== Description and aspects ===
Smellmaxxing often includes three aspects: projection, sillage, and longevity. Projection refers to how far a scent radiates from the wearer, sillage describes the scented trail left behind as a person moves, and longevity refers to how long the fragrance remains detectable.

Another component of smellmaxxing is fragrance layering, the practice of combining multiple perfumes, body products, oils, or hair mists to create a personalized scent profile. In part this is associated with maintaining a fragrance wardrobe or olfactory wardrobe, a curated collection of perfumes and scented products intended for different moods, seasons, or social settings.

The ritual of applying fragrances is also another aspect of smellmaxxing. This ritual of having a scent routine can be tied to identity (e.g. lighting a scented candle, applying lotion after a shower). A growing trend is having a bedtime ritual of wearing perfume to sleep.

TikTok influencers often recommend using different scents for different occasions. For example, one can use a lighter fragrance for daytime or work settings and stronger or more complex scents for evenings. Other aspects include where on the body to apply the fragrances, where to store the fragrances, and how to make the smell last longer, for instance by first applying a moisturizer. The language used to describe the smells is not unlike that of sommeliers.

Motivations for smellmaxxing may include seduction, self-expression, achieving popularity, appearing more mature, or as a way to relate to older role models. This trend has framed fragrances as tools for emotional expression and identity formation. Some fragrance brands increasingly marketed products using wellness-oriented claims, with 42% of Gen Z consumers reportedly prioritizing mental-health benefits in beauty purchases.

=== Impact ===
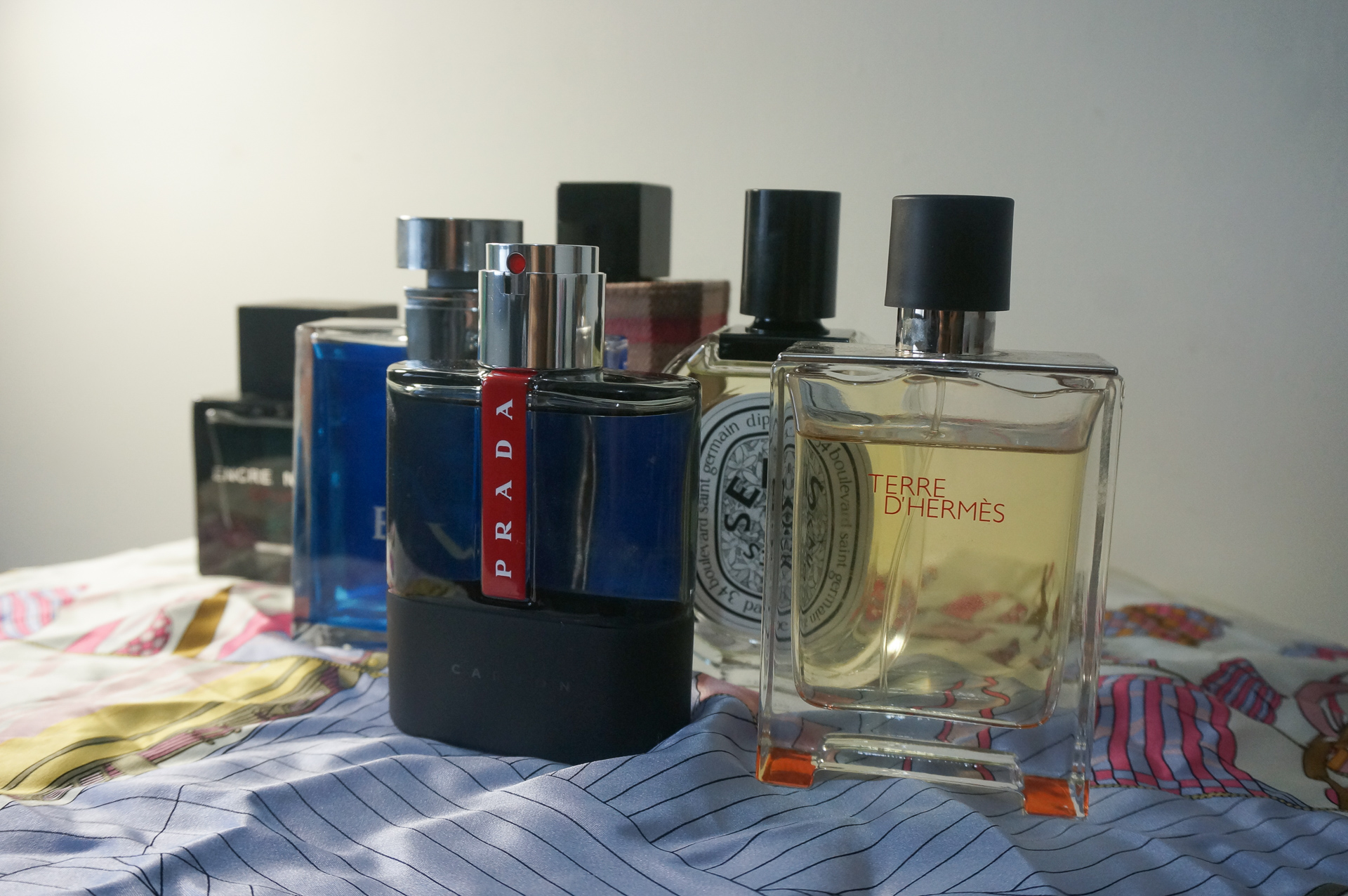
Bottles of eau de toilette. Smellmaxxing involves using different fragrances to achieve a desired odor.

A survey by Piper Sandler Companies, an investment bank, demonstrated that since the spring of 2023, the annual spending on fragrance amongst teenage males rose by 26%. In 2024, boys spent an average of $110 per year on fragrance, rising from $75 in 2023, while girls spent an average of $93 annually. Industry analyses reported that 73% of Gen Z consumers wear fragrance at least three times weekly, while fragrance spending among teenage boys increased by 44% in 2024. Social media played a major role in fragrance purchasing behavior among younger consumers: TikTok influenced fragrance purchases for 66% of Gen Z consumers, while Instagram influenced 64%. Market research by Circana showed that in the 26 weeks ending in July 2025, 38% of spending on fragrances came from households with a Gen Z member.

According to a Pinterest report predicting 2026 trends, data suggests smellmaxxing continues to be a rising fragrance trend, with searches up for "niche perfume collection" +500%, "perfume layering combinations" +125%, "scent layering" +75%, and "signature scent" +45%.

Some classrooms have banned applying fragrances, and broken glass bottles of fragrance in backpacks became a regular occurrence. The trend has also led to an increase of "dupes" (or imitations) of luxury fragrance brands.

The trend has been pervasive in Western markets, but it also has gained traction in China. However, cultural factors such as price sensitivity, fragrance preferences, and consumption patterns affect the Chinese market differently. Nevertheless, the personal fragrance market demonstrated marked growth in China and is projected to grow.

Due to the boom in the fragrance industry, patchouli oil (an aromatic oil used for perfumes) demand has increased, leading to increasing incomes for farmers but also worsening deforestation in Indonesia and increasing risk of landslides.
