= Viper (Six Flags Magic Mountain) =

Roller coaster in California

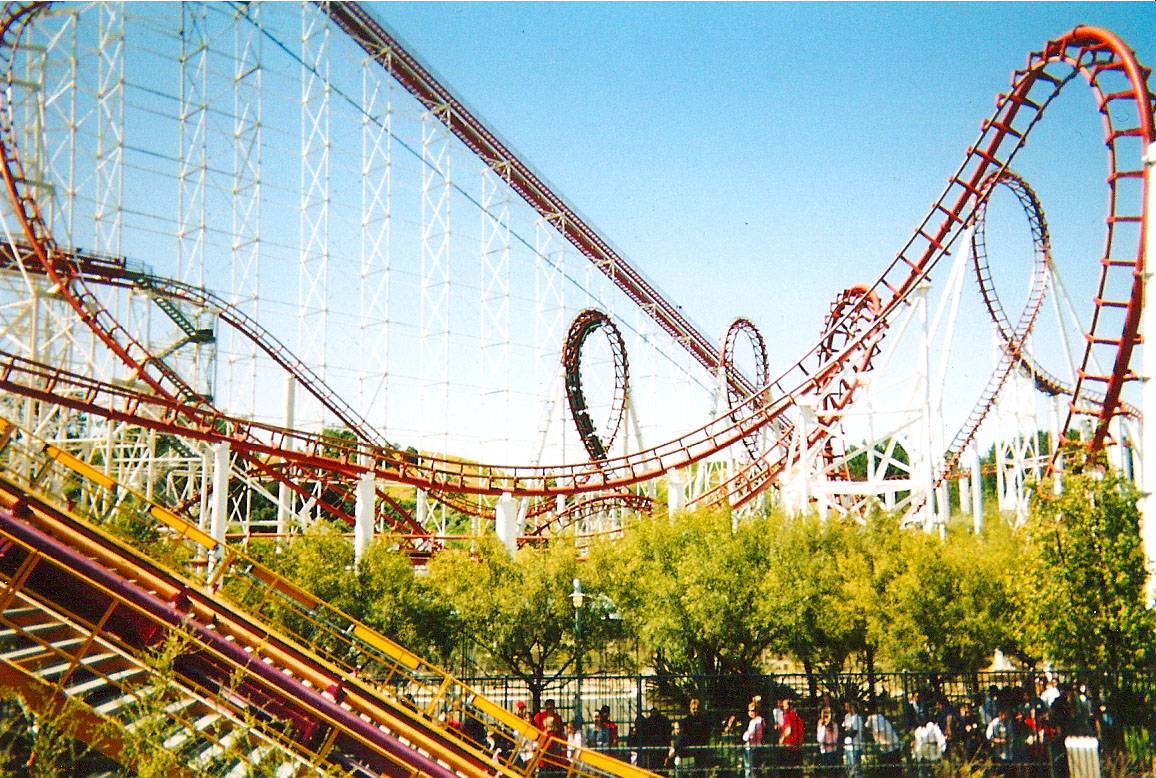

Six Flags Magic Mountain
- Location: Six Flags Magic Mountain
- Park section: Baja Ridge
- Coordinates: 34°25′15″N 118°35′43″W
- Status: Operating
- Opening date: April 7, 1990
- Cost: $8 million
- Replaced: Condor

General statistics
- Type: Steel
- Manufacturer: Arrow Dynamics
- Designer: Ron Toomer
- Model: Custom Looping Coaster
- Lift/launch system: Chain lift hill
- Height: 188 ft (57 m)
- Drop: 171 ft (52 m)
- Length: 3,830 ft (1,170 m)
- Speed: 70 mph (110 km/h)
- Inversions: 7
- Duration: 2:30
- Capacity: 1700 riders per hour
- G-force: 3.75
- Height restriction: 54 in (137 cm)
- Trains: 3 trains with 7 cars; riders arranged 2 across in 2 rows for a total of 28 riders per train
- Fast Lane available
- Must transfer from wheelchair
- Viper at RCDB

Viper is a steel roller coaster located in the Baja Ridge area of Six Flags Magic Mountain in Valencia, California, United States. Manufactured by Arrow Dynamics, it opened in 1990 and is the last remaining Arrow coaster to feature seven inversions following the removal of Shockwave at Six Flags Great America and the Great American Scream Machine at Six Flags Great Adventure. Viper was built on the former site of a HUSS tower ride type named Condor.

== History ==
In November 1989, Six Flags Magic Mountain announced that Viper would be added to the park. The ride opened on April 7, 1990.

A week after opening, Viper was shut down. Inspectors found weak links in the 800-foot (240 m) long chain. Instead of replacing the links, a new chain had to be ordered. A trim brake was also installed after the first loop. The ride would reopen a few days later.

In August 2018, Viper closed for an extended refurbishment. On December 22, 2018, Viper reopened to the public with new modifications.

== Ride experience ==
After exiting the station, the train begins climbing the 188-foot (57 m) chain lift hill. At the top, the train curves into the 171-foot (52 m) drop and enters a 144-foot (44 m) vertical loop. The train then makes a sharp left, entering two additional vertical loops and climbing into the mid-course brake run. This is followed by a zig-zag into a Batwing element, where the riders experience a half-corkscrew followed by a half loop. The train then proceeds into another half loop and half corkscrew, sending it in the opposite direction. An on-ride camera photographs riders in the middle of this element. This is followed by a right turn and two corkscrews which invert the riders twice. The track leads into a flat section followed by an s-curve drop and rise into the final brake run, before turning right and returning to the station.

== Records ==
When Viper opened in 1990, it was the tallest and fastest looping coaster in the world. Its speed record was eclipsed the following year by Steel Phantom at Kennywood, which opened in 1991 with a top speed of 80 mph (130 km/h), but it regained the speed record in 2000 when Steel Phantom closed. The height record for the tallest vertical loop lasted until 2000, with the opening of Superman: Krypton Coaster at Six Flags Fiesta Texas.

== In media ==
Viper was featured in the 1992 film Encino Man, in which it was referred to as "Vaper". Viper also made appearances in the 1993 film True Romance and the 2000 film Space Cowboys, as well as in commercials for Toyota and Cheetos.

Viper was featured in the 1993 episode of Beverly Hills, 90210, "She Came in Through the Bathroom Window", in which the cast goes to Magic Mountain on Senior Skip Day and Andrea conquers her fear of roller coasters. In 2012, it appeared in the Glee episode "Big Brother", when the cast rides it during their visit to the park on senior ditch day. The song "Up, Up, Up" is sung over the experience.

The coaster appears in the video game RollerCoaster Tycoon 2 as part of a recreation of the Six Flags Magic Mountain park.

Viper was also featured in Lucifer season 3, episode 25, when the character Dan rides it after being trapped by one of the suspects in that episode.

Viper was featured in the 2021 Netflix Original Yes Day.

Viper is depicted being ridden by the American rapper Ice Spice in the music video for her song "Big Guy".
