= Christina Aguilera Fragrances =

Perfume brand by Christina Aguilera

- Product type: Perfumes; Cosmetics (body lotion, body spray, bath gels and deodorants)
- Produced by: Procter & Gamble (2007–2016); Elizabeth Arden, Inc. (2016); Revlon (2016-present)
- Country: United States
- Introduced: 2007; 19 years ago
- Markets: North America; Latin America; Asia; Europe
- Ambassador: Christina Aguilera
- Website: parfum.christinaaguilera.com

Christina Aguilera Fragrances is a perfume brand by American singer Christina Aguilera. It was founded in 2007 in a deal with Procter & Gamble, who manufactured the products until 2016, after its production and distribution rights were bought out by Elizabeth Arden, Inc., until Revlon acquired the global license a month later. In addition to fragrances, the brand has also worked with the production and sale of other cosmetics, including body lotions, body sprays, bath gels, and deodorants.

The line was influenced by a wide variety of flowers, exotic fruits and Aguilera's childhood in Japan. In addition to being met with positive reviews by perfume critics, the scents received numerous awards and accolades, including at the Duftstars Awards and FiFi Awards. The brand's products became successful after its launch, especially in Europe, where it is referred to as the "number-one celebrity perfume line". In January 2016, its monthly gross income was $80 million, according Stifel analysts. The fragrances also achieved popularity among celebrities and was worn by stars such as Perrie Edwards, Steve Antin and Aguilera herself.

== Background and creation ==
In 2000 Aguilera signed a deal with New Dana Perfumes Corporation (NDPC) to promote, choose colors, products and packaging for Fetish cosmetics line. The brand consisted of a wide variety of makeup, nail arts, shower gels, bath oils, body lotions, as well three fragrances—manufactured in partnership with International Flavors & Fragrances (IFF). Commercialized at Sears and Walgreens stores, the brand's slogan referenced the title of her Billboard Hot 100 number-one single "What a Girl Wants". NDPC's executives expected to increase the company's wholesales in $50 million with the release of Fetish line in 2001, and it was promoted with a strong advertising in the leading teen magazines, including Seventeen, Allure and YM. Aguilera discussed about endorsing the products, stating "I am a lover of fashion and playing with makeup, and I want to have a big say in this [...] I am always checking out products. I can bring these amazing trends around the world to teens. I get to give back in my own way". However, in 2002, she did not renewed her contract with the corporation, aiming "new directions" in beauty business, and the brand was discontinued.

Aguilera returned to the fragrance industry in 2004; she signed a contract with the Greek manufacturer Sarantis, releasing three distinctive scents as part of the Xpose line. The brand was sold in selected European countries only and was promoted with television advertisements. Irish Examiner reported that the perfumes line "garnered international success" in terms of sales. In 2007, Women's Wear Daily announced a long-term licensing deal from Procter & Gamble (P&G) to create the Christina Aguilera Fragrances. Heike Hindenlang, company's global marketing director, commented about the partnership with Aguilera, adding "She sends out a clear message and clear connection with fans. She tries to empower her fans, particularly women, to get out of difficult situations. Christina is also omnipresent in the media". Aguilera revealed that her debut scent under the line would be released in the same year, and explained her team up with the corporation: "I love trying new things in my music and in fashion. To have a perfume of my own is the beginning of an exciting adventure. P&G is the ideal partner for this new experience".

== Products ==
=== Conception ===
In addition to fragrances, the line manufactures body lotions, body sprays, bath gels, and deodorants, and the smell of the products has been influenced by Aguilera's mother and son, her childhood in Japan and a wide variety of flowers and exotic fruits. During an interview with Marie Claire, she recalled that her mother used to wear the Poison perfume by Christian Dior, which she credits to be where got her "taste for musky [and] sensual scents", adding: "One of the strongest memories I have as a child is my mom doing her makeup at her vanity. I would always want to spray her fragrance on me — I can still remember the smell. I love the idea of sharing something so personal with my fans". While developing the brands's debut fragrance, Aguilera declared that it embodied "everything that makes [her] smile and relax, like tuberose candles", mixing it with "musky tones" as additional inspiration from male colognes. Her son, Max, also served as a "big inspiration", as she describes his energy as "contagious and positive", which inspired a "more colourful direction" at her work both in music and in the cosmetic industry.

Aguilera also worked with a range of flowers to produce the smell of her perfume line. Due to its "eternal and unmistakable symbol of womanhood", she choose magnolia to develop her fragrances, stating: "[It] is one of the oldest flowers in existence. The fresh, lush scent empowers inner femininity while soft, velvety petals feel like a caressing touch on the skin". Jasmine was also chosen for the creation process, which she described as "synonymous [with] Old Hollywood glamour". Other of her favorite petals to create new scents includes tuberose, gardenia, freesia, rose and Valencia orange flower. Royal Desire was primarily inspired by Aguilera's childhood in Japan and contains traditional ingredients, as well as the country's exotic fruits such as yuzu, mandarin and honeysuckle. Other of her portfolio's fragrances, Red Sin, references her signature color and to its composition was included some of her favorite scents like red apple and cinnamon.

=== Packing and scents ===
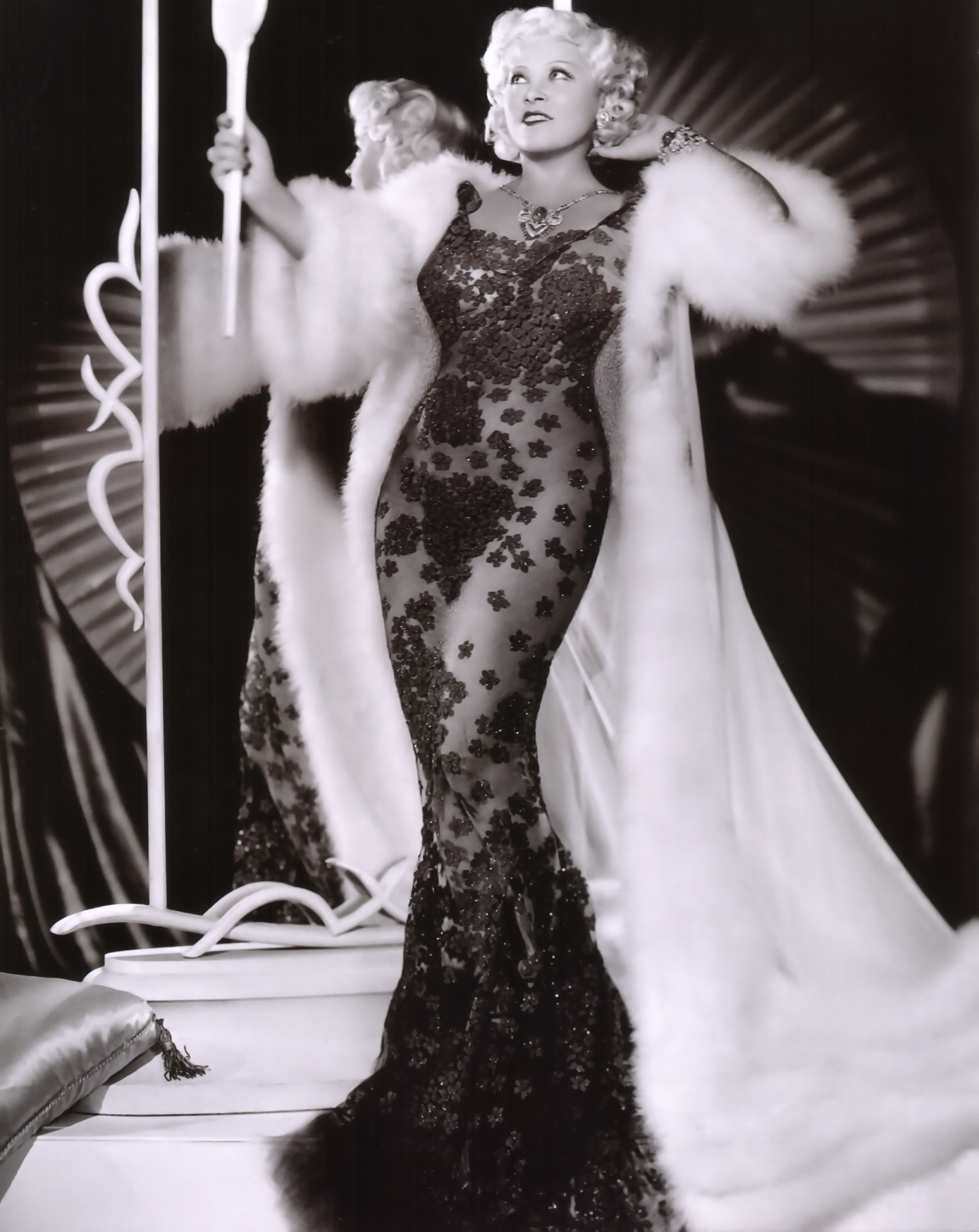
Mae West wearing the black lace dress in Go West, Young Man (1936). The design inspired the bottle of the line's debut fragrance.

The scents have been known for their curvy bottle design, which emphasize Aguilera's hourglass figure, as well the covered lace on top inspired by her "love of vintage glamour". For the bottle of the line's debut fragrance, a black lace was designed to provide a "distinctly feminine feel", developed as a reference to the "legendary dress" created to Mae West by French designer Marcel Rochas. In other one-off releases, the covered lace has been replaced by a coat of arms featuring a small mirror filled with flowers. However, the Inspire perfume was projected in a different aesthetic from other products; created on a "classic teardrop shape", it features a "silver disk-like top detailed with red crystals". Hilary Howard, columnist for The New York Times, analyzed the brand's bottles and called it "charmed", in addition to noting that each flask of the Royal Desire scent "comes with a silver charm that can be worn on as necklace or bracelet".

Aguilera's fragrances generally contain base notes of sandalwood, musk and vanilla in their composition, in addition to being combined with a wide range of flowers and exotic fruits. Inspire was developed as a "mix of fruity mango and citrus top notes with a hint of freesia", while By Night combines tangerine, red apple, peach and May blossom. Royal Desire, called an "oriental scent with notes like yuzu and lily", also mixes marshmallow, mandarin and blackberry. Embodying "sensuality and true confidence", Secret Potion has top notes of passion fruit, lemon and mandarin, merged with lotus, jasmine and tonka bean. Billboard magazine described Red Sin as a "glorification of womanhood with the provocative symbolism of red", and emphasized the use of red ginger, cinnamon and cyclamen flowers in its creation process. Called "irresistible [and] glamorous", the Unforgettable fragrance "starts with smells of cashmere, vanilla and tonka at its base, adds night-blooming jasmine and Turkish rose", and is "finished with the scents of plum and pomegranate".

Touch of Seduction combines lychee, raspberry, orris honeysuckle and sugared rose, while Glam X was created as "one exotic blend of delicate florals, spicy star anise and warm musks", including caramelized peach, jasmine and lily of the valley. The smell of the Definition fragrance features bergamot orange, mandarin diamond orchid and has as base notes heliotrope and amber. The Moonlight Bloom scent is the result of a mix of blackcurrant, dahlia, narcissus and dark ambrette seed. Discussing about her perfume brand, Aguilera described each of her scents, the message, and purpose of its products to femininity and self-confidence:

Each fragrance evokes a different emotion and mindset, and they reflect scents I personally love. I hope the scents inspires women to become the best versions of themselves [...] My fragrances always have the message of taking pride in who you are as a woman, which to me represents inner femininity. A woman embodies pride and empowerment. The bright, fruity scent provides a powerful start to instill self-confidence. This is a unique attribute women have [and] fragrance is a one-size-fits-all type of product, and I love that it smells a little different on each person. It's also a fast and easy way to feel sexy.

=== Line ===
Name	Year	Ref.
Christina Aguilera	2007	
Inspire	2008	
By Night	2009	
Royal Desire	2010	
Secret Potion	2011	
Red Sin	2012	
Unforgettable	2013	
Woman	2014	
Touch of Seduction	2015	
Glam X	2017	
Definition	2017	
Violet Noir	2018	
Xperience	2019	
Eau So Beautiful	2020	
Moonlight Bloom	2021	
Cherry Noir	2022	
Xtina	2023	

== Promotion ==
Aguilera has worked with many promotional strategies linked to her scent's line, in addition to wear the perfumes herself, especially when making public appearances. In 2007, Aguilera starred in a television advertising for the brand's debut fragrance in which she strips down while choose a new outfit in the closet; posteriorly, a black lace covers her skin as she apply the scent. Launched in 2009, By Night product's exclusive commercial shows "Christina working it for the cameras in a seriously sexy lace dress and vampish make-up, as she gets ready for a night out in her boudoir". Both fragrances were also featured in a scene from "Not Myself Tonight" music video, directed by Hype Williams, released as lead single for Aguilera's sixth studio album, Bionic (2010).

In 2008, Aguilera chose David LaChapelle as director for the Inspire scent's advertising campaign, due to its photography "full of life, colour, provocative imagery, and excitement". During an interview with Flare magazine, she revealed the idea behind the shoot which concept was "inspired by a lot of 1960s pop art", and artists such as Andy Warhol and Roy Lichtenstein. To promote Royal Desire fragrance, its television commercial features Aguilera "standing in a royal chamber, when she notices a gift sitting on her throne [and] bends down to pick the perfume's package". However, the advertising was criticized in the media and dubbed as a "low-budget soft porn", as she "[displayed] her cleavage to the camera" to sprays the perfume on her decolletage.

Directed by Matthew Rolston in 2011, Secret Potion scent's television advertising shows Aguilera riding an "elevator to a penthouse party", while her "stunning grey frock is just too drab for such a well-attended bash", she decides to spray the perfume to create a "form-fitting dress covered in sparkles". In the following year, Red Sin fragrance's advertising campaign was launched and features "Aguilera rolling around in her bedsheets [and] then naked in a bath tub". Billboard columnist Gregory DelliCarpini Jr. compared her image in the television commercial with that of Marilyn Monroe. Definition perfume's promotional video follows a "Trump-esque gilded hall, as Aguilera struts into the lavishly decorated room in a pastel pink silky hip-length coat [while] the wind blowing her platinum locks". During Moonlight Bloom scent's exclusive commercial, she was presented on a "lace-up dark blue vest with a par of figure-hugging leather pants" while "pulled of a variety of poses under some sheer fabric". In 2022, the promotional video received a nomination in the "Public's Choice: Commercial Advertisement" category at the Duftstars Awards.

Aguilera's fragrances were also supported by presential events. In addition to promoted autograph sessions during its scents launch ceremonies in Germany and in the United States, thousands of hangers featuring the brand's logo was scattered across Israel's main streets as part of a guerrilla marketing. Throughout the years, the perfumes portfolio have appeared as indications in Allure, Cosmopolitan, Elle, Glamour, and Seventeen beauty magazine issues. The line also received media attention after its products were revealed as the favorite fragrances of celebrities such as Perrie Edwards and Steve Antin.

== Reception ==
=== Critical response ===
Aguilera's perfume brand was received with generally positive reviews by critics. In a review of its debut self-titled scent, Grazia magazine editors opined that "while it's everything you'd expect from a typical celebrity fragrance [...], it's not overpowering or cloying and is, dare we say it, pretty damn sensual". Writing for Yahoo! Beauty, Lauren Carbran shared the same point of view, describing it as "sweet and a little saucy, [puts] you centre-stage wherever you are", in addition to recommending it to "lavish affairs to experience its magic in full force". In a review for Elle magazine, Emily Hebert named By Night among the best new scents of 2010 fall, highlighting its "heady vanilla, amber, peach, and May blossom". In the same year, Cosmopolitan reviewers named Royal Desire as one of the best perfumes for winter due to its "oriental notes [...] making it warm and heady – perfect for winter nights". Melissa Magsaysay, author from Los Angeles Times, also praised Royal Desire fragrance, calling it an "oriental scent with notes like yuzu and lily". Magsaysay opined that the "standout element [of the perfume] is a top note of sugary sweet marshmallow that's very much heightened by honeysuckle and black currant".

In December 2011, editors from Glamour Russia ranked Secret Potin among the best perfumes of the month, writing that "Aguilera reveals old secrets with pleasure [...] the aroma of self-confidence, the smell of a woman who is aware of her strength". At Basenotes, which assigns a standard score rating out of five stars to reviews from users critics, Unforgettable fragrance received four stars, whose written avaliation called it "a luscious mix of woods, vanilla, light florals and fruity notes", in addition to recognize it as "sweet, but not sugary sweet [...] it's [not] cloying either". Irina Kuzmicheva, writer of Elle Russia, described Touch of Seduction as a scent "designed for seduction", highlighting in its composition three aphrodisiacs such as rose, vanilla and musk. Kuzmicheva also noted that it follows the same base from other Aguilera's fragrances, with notes of "sandalwood [...] that leaves a gentle velvety sensation". In a less optimistic review, Philadelphia magazine columnist Liz Spikol commented about Woman scent, opining that it "radiates Central Pennsylvania holiday shopping excursions", although she recognized it was not "overwhelming".

=== Accolades ===
In addition to being met with positive reviews by perfume critics, the brand has received numerous awards and nominations. Presented by The Fragrance Foundation, it was honoured throughout the years at the Duftstars Awards and FiFi Awards—whose ceremony has been dubbed in the media as "the Oscars of fragrances industry". In 2011, Glamour magazine editors prized one of the brand's perfumes at their annual event gala, the Glammy Beauty Awards. Due to its popularity in Russia, some of portfolio's fragrances was awarded in 'Best of Beauty' ceremonies by Allure and Glamour periodical issues. Furthermore, the line's debut scent was ranked among the best celebrity women's perfumes of all time by Evening Standard and Yahoo!. In 2012, Stylist magazine named Royal Desire as one of the eight credible celebrity fragrances.

Complete list of awards and nominations received by Christina Aguilera Fragrances
Year	Ceremony	Recipient	Category	Result	Ref.
2013	Allure Best of Beauty Awards	Red Sin	Best Celebrity Fragrance	Won	
2014	Allure Best of Beauty Awards	Unforgettable	Best Celebrity Fragrance	Won	
2008	Basenotes Fragrance Awards	Christina Aguilera	Best Celebrity Fragrance for Women	Nominated	
2011	CEW Beauty Awards	Christina Aguilera	Women's Scent Mass	Won	
2012	CEW Beauty Awards	Royal Desire	Women's Scent Mass	Won	
2009	CEW UK Beauty Awards	Inspire	Women's Celebrity Fragrance	Nominated	
2009	Cosmopolitan Beauty Awards (Finland)	Inspire	Best Female Fragrance	Won	
2009	Cosmopolitan Beauty Awards (Sweden)	Inspire	Best Female Fragrance	Won	
2009	Cosmopolitan Fragrance Awards	Inspire	Best Celebrity Fragrance for Women	Won	
2008	Duftstars Awards (Note: Duftstars Awards are a German version of the FiFi Awards, both presented by The Fragrance Foundation.)	Christina Aguilera	Public's Choice: Lifestyle Fragrance – Women	Won	
2008	Duftstars Awards	Christina Aguilera	Lifestyle Fragrance – Women	Won	
2010	Duftstars Awards	By Night	Lifestyle Fragrance – Women	Won	
2011	Duftstars Awards	Royal Desire	Public's Choice: Lifestyle Fragrance – Women	Won	
2013	Duftstars Awards	Red Sin	Lifestyle Fragrance – Women	Won	
2013	Duftstars Awards	Red Sin	Public's Choice: Lifestyle Fragrance – Women	Won	
2014	Duftstars Awards	Unforgettable	Public's Choice: Lifestyle Fragrance – Women	Won	
2014	Duftstars Awards	Unforgettable	Lifestyle Fragrance – Women	Won	
2015	Duftstars Awards	Woman	Lifestyle Fragrance – Women	Nominated	
2016	Duftstars Awards	Touch of Seduction	Lifestyle Fragrance – Women	Nominated	
2017	Duftstars Awards	Glam X	Public's Choice: Lifestyle Fragrance – Women	Nominated	
2018	Duftstars Awards	Definition	Lifestyle Fragrance – Women	Nominated	
2020	Duftstars Awards	Xperience	Lifestyle Fragrance – Women	Nominated	
2021	Duftstars Awards	Eau So Beautiful	Lifestyle Fragrance – Women	Nominated	
2022	Duftstars Awards	Moonlight Bloom	Lifestyle Fragrance – Women	Nominated	
2022	Duftstars Awards	Moonlight Bloom	Public's Choice: Commercial Advertisement	Nominated	
2009	FiFi Awards (Russia)	By Night	Lifestyle Fragrance – Women	Won	
2013	FiFi Awards (Russia)	Unforgettable	Lifestyle Fragrance – Celebrity	Won	
2008	FiFi Awards (United Kingdom)	Christina Aguilera	Public's Choice: Favorite Celebrity Fragrance	Won	
2009	FiFi Awards (United Kingdom)	Inspire	Favorite New Prestige Fragrance for Women	Nominated	
2011	FiFi Awards (United States)	Christina Aguilera	Women's Broad Appeal Fragrance	Nominated	
2011	FiFi Awards (United States)	By Night	Women's Broad Appeal Fragrance	Nominated	
2012	FiFi Awards (United States)	Royal Desire	Women's Broad Appeal Fragrance	Nominated	
2012	FiFi Awards (United States)	Royal Desire	Packaging of the Year – Women's Broad Appeal	Nominated	
2013	FiFi Awards (United States)	Red Sin	Fragrance of the Year – Women's Popular	Nominated	
2011	GLAMMY Beauty Awards	Royal Desire	Basic Perfume	Won	
2013	Glamour Best of Beauty Awards	Red Sin	Celebrity Perfume	Won	
2014	Glamour Best of Beauty Awards	Unforgettable	Celebrity Perfume	Won	
2013	Joy Trend Awards	Red Sin	Best Lifestyle Perfume	Won	
2014	Joy Trend Awards	Unforgettable	Best Lifestyle Perfume	Won	
2012	PopCrush Awards	Red Sin	Best Perfume	Nominated	

== Commercial performance ==
The brand is sold in North America, Latin America, Asia and Europe—market of which it is commonly referred to as the "number-one celebrity fragrance brand". From the start of scent's line distribution, its products proved to be a commercial success. In its debut year at stores, Procter & Gamble (P&G) executives estimated that the brand could do $50 million wholesale sales worldwide, with $20 million coming from the United States alone. After its production and distribution rights been bought out by Elizabeth Arden, Inc., was reported that the fragrance line had $80 million in sales in January 2016 according to Stifel analyst Mark Astrachan.

In 2007, according to The Perfume Shop managing director Jeremy Seigal, Aguilera's debut fragrance was among the top five best-selling scents in its stores in the United Kingdom and Ireland. In the same year, according to reports from Superdrug's stores, it was the second and third celebrity fragrance most commercialized in the countries in 2007 and 2008, respectively. In general distributions, its perfumes were ranked among the United Kingdom best-sellers in 2007, 2009, and 2010. In 2008, Aguilera attended a promotional event for its scents line at the Macy's Herald Square, attracting over $50,000 in sales that weekend alone. The brand's parent company, Revlon, filed for Chapter 11 bankruptcy in June 2022, and eventually emerged from it in early 2023.

== See also ==
- List of celebrity-branded perfumes

== Sources ==
- Dominguez, Pier (2003). Christina Aguilera: A Star is Made: The Unauthorized Biography. Amber Communications Group, Inc. ISBN 978-0-970-222-459.
- Worth, Robert (2015). Christina Aguilera: Pop Singer. Enslow Publishing. ISBN 978-0-76-607198-8.
- Commane, Gemma (2020). Bad Girls, Dirty Bodies: Sex, Performance and Safe Femininity. Bloomsbury Publishing. ISBN 978-1-35-011735-8.
- Saucet, Marcel (2015). Street Marketing: The Future of Guerrilla Marketing and Buzz. ABC-Clio. ISBN 978-1-44-083839-2.
