= Shockwave (Six Flags Great America) =

Defunct looping roller coaster

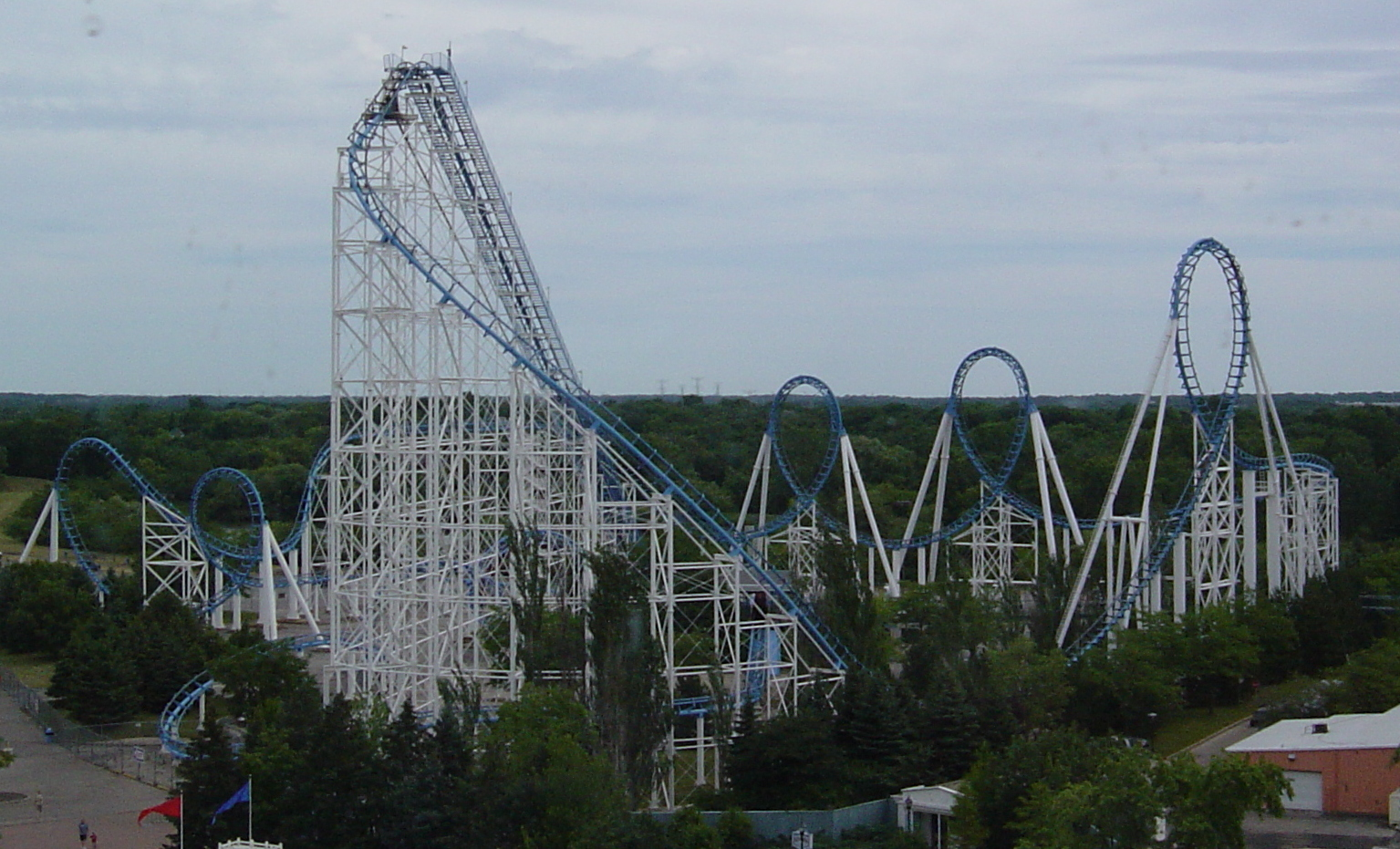

Six Flags Great America
- Location: Six Flags Great America
- Park section: Orleans Place
- Coordinates: 42.3712°N 87.9343°W
- Status: Removed
- Opening date: June 3, 1988
- Closing date: 2002
- Cost: $6,000,000
- Replaced by: Superman: Ultimate Flight

General statistics
- Type: Steel
- Manufacturer: Arrow Dynamics
- Model: Custom Looping Coaster
- Lift/launch system: Chain lift hill
- Height: 170 ft (52 m)
- Drop: 155 ft (47 m)
- Length: 3,900 ft (1,200 m)
- Speed: 65 mph (105 km/h)
- Inversions: 7
- Duration: 2:20
- Capacity: 2000 riders per hour
- Height restriction: 54 in (137 cm)
- Shockwave at RCDB

Shockwave was a steel roller coaster at Six Flags Great America in Gurnee, Illinois, United States, located in the Orleans Place section of the park. Manufactured by Arrow Dynamics, the coaster opened in 1988 as the world's tallest roller coaster and the fastest steel coaster, standing 170 feet (52 m) tall and reaching speeds of 65 miles per hour (105 km/h). It featured seven inversions, a record at the time, including three vertical loops, a batwing, and a double corkscrew. Shockwave was the first of three coasters with similar layouts built at Six Flags parks, preceding Great American Scream Machine at Six Flags Great Adventure and Viper at Six Flags Magic Mountain.

Multiple guests later regarded Shockwave's ride experience as rough, and several reported sustaining minor injuries while riding. In 2002, the coaster was dismantled to make way for Superman: Ultimate Flight, which opened the following year. The park originally planned to remove Whizzer to make space for the new coaster, but in response to public feedback, Shockwave was selected for removal instead. Shockwave's pieces sat in storage just outside of the park until being scrapped in 2004, and the ride's trains were sent to Six Flags Great Adventure and Six Flags Magic Mountain to help maintain their similar coasters.

== History ==
In late 1987, Six Flags Great America announced the construction of Shockwave for the 1988 season. Upon opening, Shockwave would be the tallest roller coaster in the world, as well as the fastest steel coaster. Shockwave would reach a height of 170 feet (52 m) and a maximum speed of 65 miles per hour (105 km/h) using a 155-foot-tall (47 m) drop, the tallest drop on a roller coaster at the time. Additionally, Shockwave would debut with the most inversions on a roller coaster at seven, surpassing Vortex at Kings Island, the previous record holder, which opened the year prior with six.

Shockwave was built for a price of $6 million ($16.3 million in 2025). The ride was designed by Ron Toomer and was manufactured by Arrow Dynamics; Camosy Inc. built the ride's foundations, Southern Ohio Fabricators manufactured the ride's supports, and McHenry Construction erected the coaster's steel. The ride was constructed on land that had previously been part of the park's parking lot. Shockwave opened to the public on June 3, 1988.

On May 5, 1989, Six Flags Great Adventure opened Great American Scream Machine, which featured a layout nearly identical to Shockwave's, but with a slightly taller height of 173 feet (53 m) and a slightly faster top speed of 68 miles per hour (109 km/h), surpassing Shockwave to become the world's tallest and fastest roller coaster, holding the title for less than a month until the debut of Cedar Point's Magnum XL-200 on May 6 of the same year. In 1990, Six Flags Magic Mountain opened Viper, which stood 188 feet (57 m) tall and reached a maximum speed of 70 miles per hour (110 km/h). Shockwave, Great American Scream Machine, and Viper were all created by Arrow Dynamics and featured the same elements in the same order.

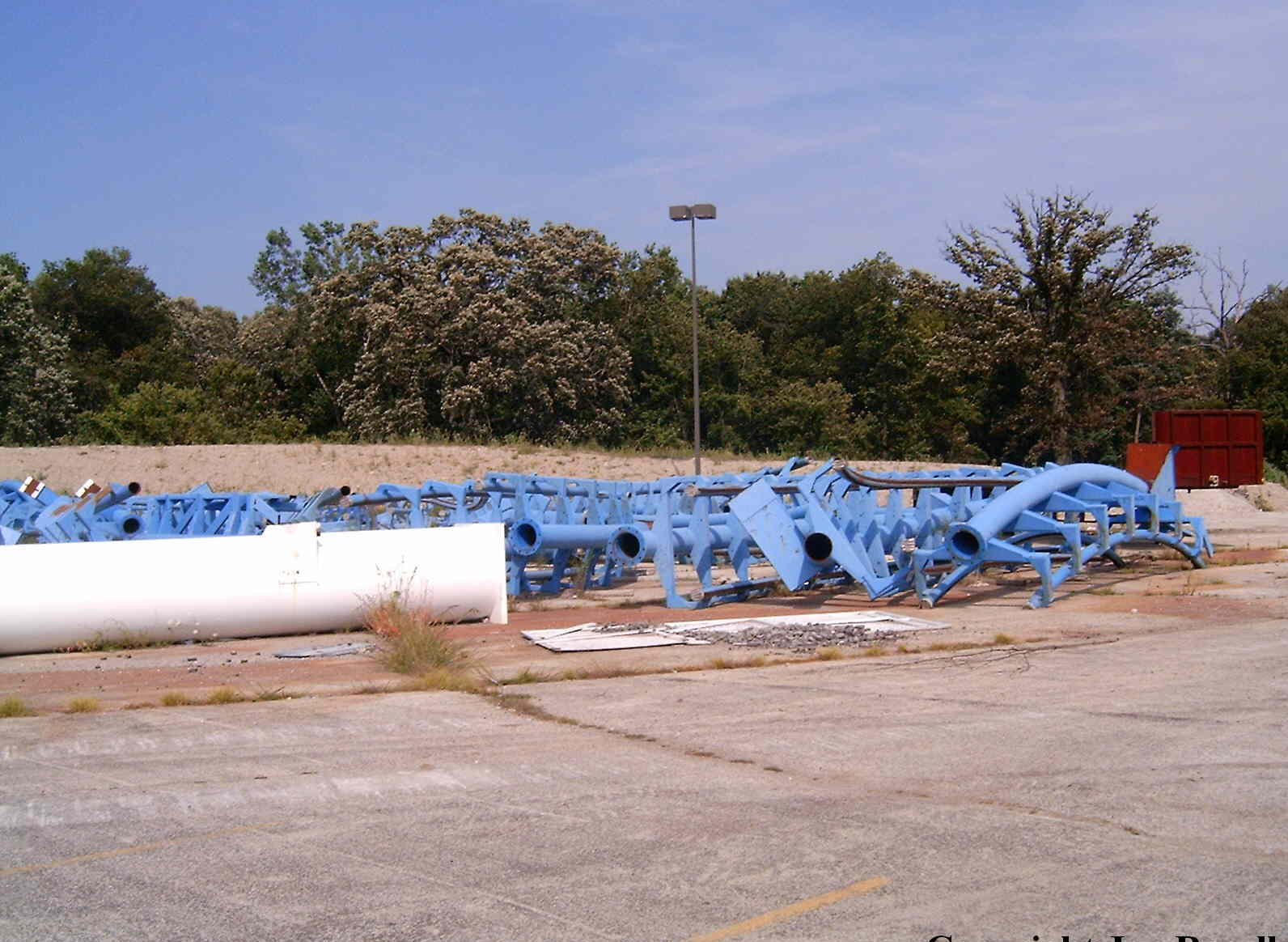
Pieces of Shockwave in storage in 2004

In 2002, Six Flags Great America announced that the Whizzer family coaster would be removed to make way for the park's 2003 addition, with its final day of operation set for August 11. The Chicago Sun-Times reported that following the announcement, the park received hundreds of calls and letters asking that the ride not be removed. These requests came from families from across the Midwest and members of the American Coaster Enthusiasts, according to the Daily Herald. As a result of this feedback, the park decided to keep Whizzer, instead opting to remove Shockwave. Prior to its closure, Shockwave reportedly faced low ridership and rising maintenance costs, riders repeatedly described the ride experience as uncomfortable, and the coaster was associated with multiple reports of minor injuries. On September 24, 2002, it was confirmed that Shockwave would not reopen for the 2003 season. The ride had begun to be dismantled by the following day.

After Shockwave closed, Six Flags Great America spokesperson Susan Storey initially stated that the coaster would be relocated, mentioning that it would likely be moved to another Six Flags park, though this never occurred. The coaster's pieces sat in storage just outside of the park until 2004, when they were scrapped. Following this, Shockwave's red train was sent to Six Flags Great Adventure to provide spare parts for Great American Scream Machine, while the blue and yellow trains were sent to Six Flags Magic Mountain to support Viper. Bolts from the coaster were given away in a raffle to members of American Coaster Enthusiasts. Shockwave's plot of land and gift shop were reused for Superman: Ultimate Flight, which opened a year later on May 3, 2003.

== Characteristics ==
Shockwave was located in the Orleans Place area of Six Flags Great America. Its 3,900 feet (1,200 m) of steel track were painted blue and had white supports. The ride operated with three trains, each painted red, yellow, or blue. The trains featured seven two-row cars, seating two riders per row, for a total of 28 riders per train. This configuration gave Shockwave a maximum theoretical capacity of 2,000 riders per hour. Each seat was equipped with an individual over-the-shoulder restraint. Riders had to be at least 54 inches (137 cm) tall to ride Shockwave.

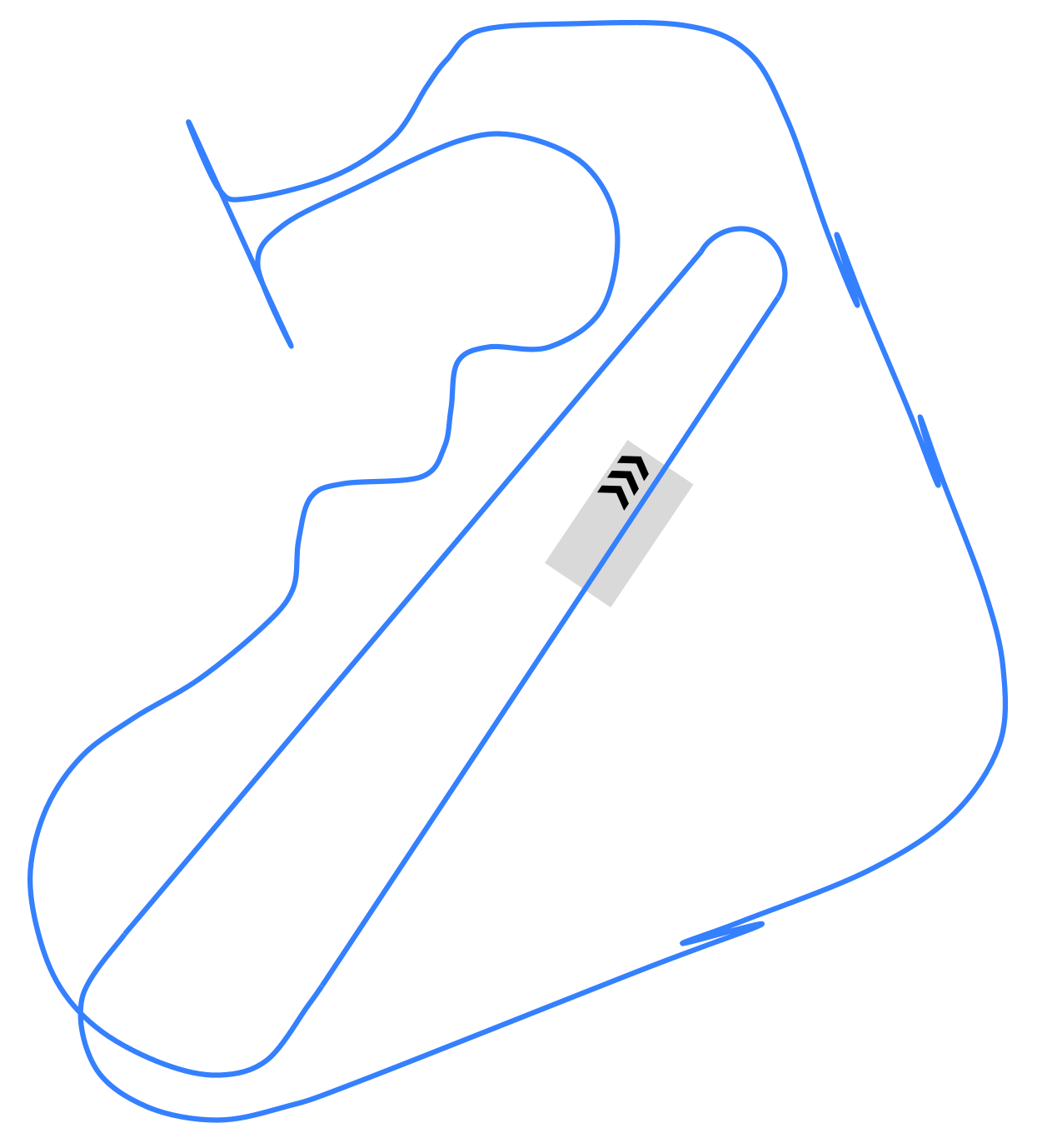
A top-down diagram of Shockwave's layout

After being dispatched from the station, trains made a left-hand U-turn, then climbed the 188-foot-tall (57 m) chain lift hill before dropping 155 feet (47 m) while turning to the left. Following the drop was a 130-foot-tall (40 m) vertical loop, a left turn, and two 116-foot-tall (35 m) loops. Next, trains climbed an upwards left turn into the mid-course brake run before passing the on-ride camera and descending into a batwing. After making a right turn and traversing a double corkscrew, trains navigated a hill and a left turn into the final brake run. One ride lasted approximately two minutes and twenty seconds.

== Reception ==
In 1993, The Post-Crescent reported that Shockwave was the park's most popular attraction by riders; the Milwaukee Journal Sentinel documented that in 1994, Shockwave had dropped to second place at 1.71 million riders behind American Eagle. In Shockwave's final year, Jeffery Westhoff from the Northwest Herald called the loops "a blast", while Joseph Lopez of the same newspaper described the ride as "intense" and "almost guaranteed to cause headaches and nausea". Other news sources deemed the ride "rough" and "bumpy", and after its removal, Jeff Pizek of the Daily Herald called the ride "infamously jarring". Multiple riders reported experiencing their heads repeatedly striking the ride's over-the-shoulder restraints, with some citing the left turn into the mid-course brake run as problematic. Others criticized the coaster for its lack of landscaping, being constructed over a section of land that was formerly part of the park's parking lot. Despite mixed reception, some roller coaster enthusiasts continued to express interest in the ride years after its removal.

== Records ==
Preceded by Bandit	World's Tallest Complete-Circuit Roller Coaster; June 1988–April 1989	Succeeded by Great American Scream Machine
Preceded by Bandit	World's Longest Roller Coaster Drop; June 3, 1988 – May 6, 1989	Succeeded by Magnum XL-200
Preceded by Vortex	Most Inversions on a Roller Coaster; June 1988–May 1995	Succeeded by Dragon Khan
