= Sillage =

Sillage (the French word for "wake", the trail left by a boat in water) may refer to:

- Sillage (perfume), the trail of scent left behind by one who wears perfume
- Wake (comics), a French sci-fi comics series, titled Sillage in the original
