= Sillage (perfume) =

Trail created by perfume when worn on skin

Sillage (UK: /siːˈjɑːʒ/, French: [sijaʒ]) in perfume refers to the trail created by a perfume when it is worn on the skin. It comes from the French for "wake" and can best be described as how a fragrance diffuses "in a person's wake," or behind the wearer as they move. A fragrance need not be a heavy one to have a large sillage.

== Overview ==
Sillage in a perfume is not to be confused with its 'projection' (how a fragrance is perceived by others around the wearer) and is enhanced by motion and ambient temperature as well as the inherent qualities of the skin. Fragrance has been found to be perceived by the diffusion of individual fragrance molecules. The rate of diffusion of these molecules in a fragrance, however, appears to be independent of their molecular weights, boiling points, odour thresholds and odour values.

Once a fragrance is applied to the skin, the skin itself becomes a substrate to the scent. The inherent scent of the individual skin, moisturisation of the skin, the behaviour of the microbiome of the skin, and the temperature of the surface of the skin that the fragrance is applied to will affect the sillage or diffusion of a perfume applied to it.

Compounds such as hedione (methyl dihydrojasmonate), damascones, Iso-E super (Tetramethyl acetyloctahydronaphthalenes), linalool, and synthetic musks such as cashmeran may also be added to fragrances to enhance their diffusion and sillage.

== See also ==
- Flanker (perfume)
