= Axe (brand) =

French brand of male grooming products owned by the British company Unilever

Axe / Lynx
- Product type: Men's grooming products
- Current owner: Unilever
- Country: France
- Introduced: 6 June 1983; 43 years ago
- Markets: Worldwide
- Website: www.axe.com www.lynxexpression.com

Axe or Lynx is a French brand of male grooming products owned by the London based company Unilever and marketed toward the younger male demographic. It is marketed as Lynx in the United Kingdom, Ireland, Malta, Australia, New Zealand and China.

== Products ==
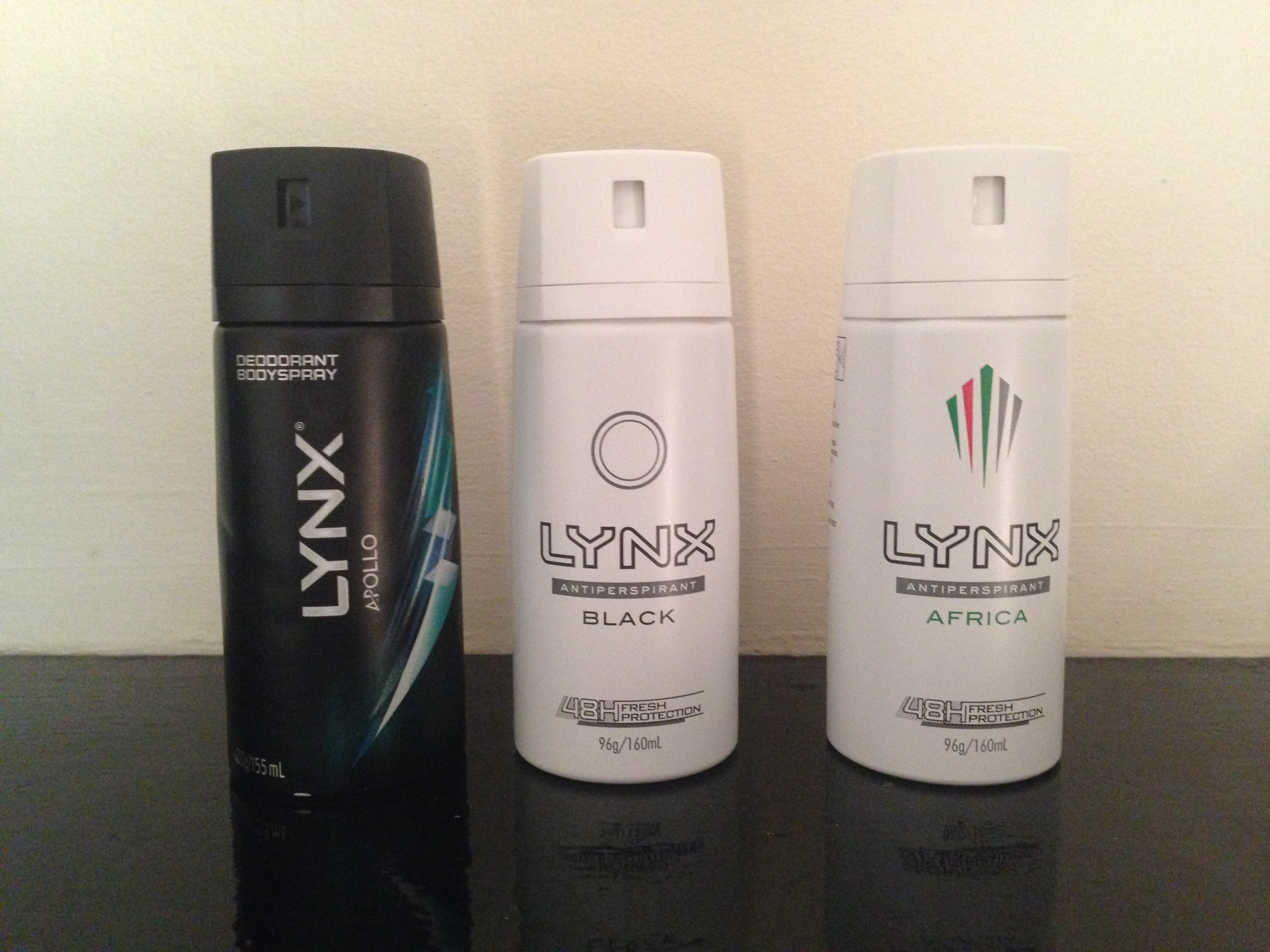
Lynx Deodorants; Apollo, Black and Africa

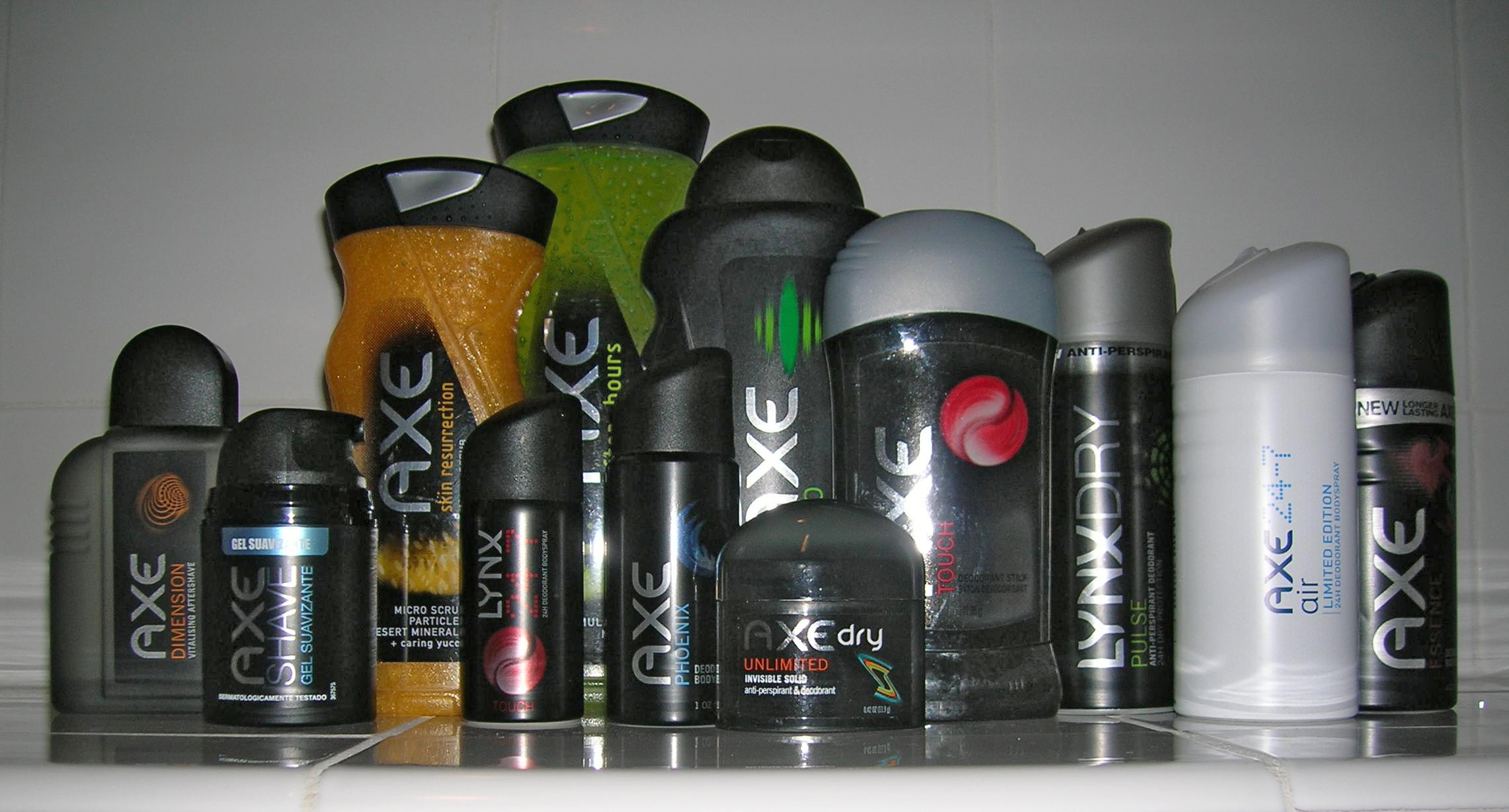
Collection of many Axe products

Axe aka Lynx was launched in France in 1983 by Unilever. It was inspired by another of Unilever's brands, Impulse. Unilever introduced many products in the range, but was forced to use the name Lynx in the United Kingdom, Ireland, Australia and New Zealand due to trademark issues with the Axe name. In addition, some countries (such as South Africa) introduced the brand as EGO until 2002.

Scents have evolved over time. From 1983 until about 1989, the variant names were descriptions of the fragrances and included Musk, Spice, Amber, Oriental, and Marine. From 1990 until 1996, geographic names for fragrances were used. In 2009, the brand launched an eight-centimetre container called the Axe Bullet. The brand has also extended into other areas.

Most scent names usually have a shower gel to accompany them and sometimes an antiperspirant/deodorant stick and an aftershave lotion. The Axe Shampoos come in three different sizes: regular size, travel or sample size, and XL bottles. Axe also ships a shower scrub tool called the Axe Detailer.

Axe also launches limited edition variants from time to time that may be on sale for a few months or over a year.

In 2024/2025, the brand was renamed to "AKC" in Russia.

== Marketing ==
From the 1990s, Axe advertisements portrayed various ways the products supposedly helped men attract women. In 2003, the advertising in the UK for the Pulse fragrance showed how it supposedly gave "geeky" men the confidence to woo women with dance. This was followed by Touch, Unlimited, Clix, and in 2007, Vice, which was marketed on a theme of making "nice" women become "naughty". Due to trademark issues, Axe products are sold under the Lynx brand name in the UK, Ireland, Australia, and New Zealand.

However, a trend called smellmaxxing contributed to a decline in the popularity of Axe, whereby high-end fragrances became more popular.

=== PR controversies ===
Adverse publicity has been generated by the product's advertisements for encouraging sexual promiscuity and sexism. The Campaign for a Commercial-Free Childhood claimed that Bartle Bogle Hegarty's work on Axe "epitomizes the sexist and degrading marketing that can undermine girls' healthy development."

On 12 January 2008 12-year-old Daniel Hurley from Derbyshire, England, died in a hospital five days after collapsing at his home. The medical coroner ruled that he had suffered from cardiac arrhythmia and died from heart failure as a result of spraying large amounts of Lynx in a confined space. Videos on social networking sites depicted teens setting themselves on fire after spraying themselves with Axe. The trend resulted in multiple injuries. After these incidents occurred, Unilever was forced to create ad campaigns reminding consumers not to overuse their product (or abuse it as an inhalant), and that it is a flammable aerosol.
