= TAG Body Spray =

Defunct Deodorant Brand

TAG Body Spray was manufactured by TAG Fragrance Company, a subsidiary of Procter & Gamble. It was first released in 2005. From 2005 to 2007, TAG Fragrance Company was part of Global Gillette, until Gillette was bought out by Procter & Gamble and dissolved. In 2016, My Imports USA acquired the TAG brand from Procter & Gamble. My Imports USA planned to launch new TAG items in early 2017. In 2024, TAG returned to shelves at Dollar Tree stores in North America.

== History ==
TAG is a re-incarnation of Right Guard Body Spray, released in 2002. Right Guard Body Spray was discontinued after several months due to very low sales. Gillette then spent the next few years trying to find how to successfully market a body spray for teenage boys. As a result of their research, TAG was released in the beginning of 2005. Gillette decided not to include any sign that Gillette manufactured the product on the product itself or in the advertising. It was decided that Gillette's reputation from its other products would detract from the sale of TAG.

== Marketing ==
The marketing campaign focuses on what the company describes as the "old man fantasies" of being approached by attractive women. The product's packaging, which is charcoal-grey and depicts silhouettes of women, uses fragrance names evoking success in dating. The product launched a line called the TAG Signature Series in July 2009, which reintroduced three scents with new packaging which featuring basketball star Carmelo Anthony, skateboarder Rob Dyrdek, and rapper Ludacris.

== Fragrances ==
Tag debuted with 3 scents in 2005. However, during the "TAG Signature Series Launch Party" on July 28, 2009, the company renamed its products and gained celebrity endorsements. Four fragrances are currently offered under the TAG label, three featuring a different celebrity endorsing the product on its packaging.

- Make Moves, endorsed by Rob Dyrdek. (formerly All Nighter)
- Stay Up, endorsed by Carmelo Anthony. (formerly Midnight, returned as Midnight during 2024 relaunch)
- Get Yours, endorsed by Ludacris. (formerly After Hours)
- Step Out, (formerly Wild Card)
