= Superman: Ultimate Flight =

Roller coasters at three Six Flags parks

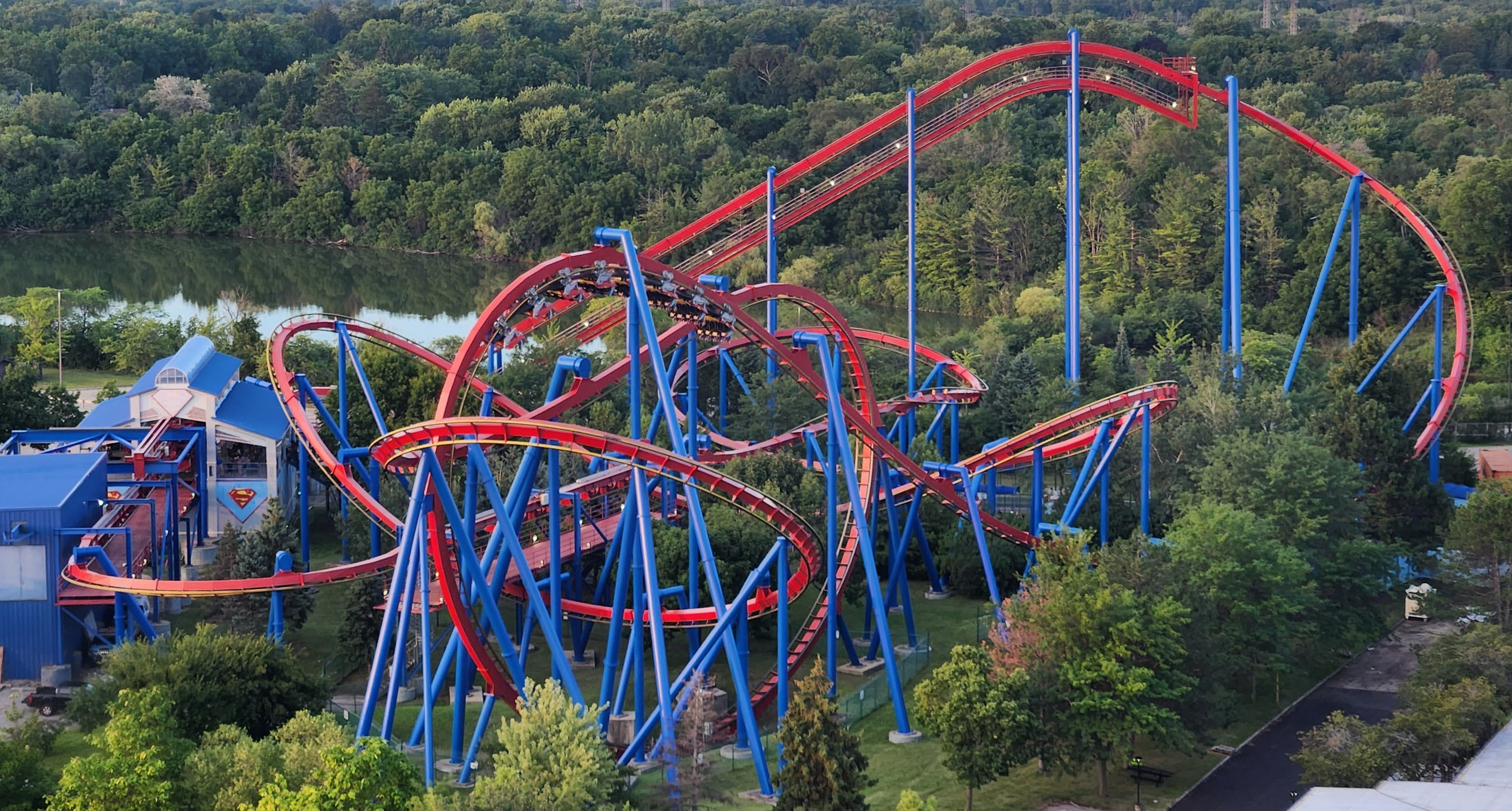
- Superman: Ultimate Flight at Six Flags Great America

Six Flags Over Georgia
- Park section: Metropolis Park
- Coordinates: 33.765745°N 84.553045°W
- Status: Operating
- Opening date: April 6, 2002
- Replaced: Viper
- Superman: Ultimate Flight at Six Flags Over Georgia at RCDB

Six Flags Great Adventure
- Park section: Shoreline Pier at the Boardwalk
- Coordinates: 40°8′20.27″N 74°26′21.94″W
- Status: Operating
- Opening date: April 17, 2003
- Superman: Ultimate Flight at Six Flags Great Adventure at RCDB

Six Flags Great America
- Park section: Orleans Place
- Coordinates: 42.371051°N 87.934265°W
- Status: Operating
- Opening date: May 3, 2003
- Replaced: Shockwave
- Superman: Ultimate Flight at Six Flags Great America at RCDB

General statistics
- Type: Steel – Flying
- Manufacturer: Bolliger & Mabillard
- Model: Flying Coaster - Superman
- Lift/launch system: Chain lift hill
- Height: 106 ft (32 m)
- Drop: 100 ft (30 m)
- Length: 2,759–2,798 ft (841–853 m)
- Speed: 51 mph (82 km/h)
- Inversions: 2 (1 non-vertical)
- Capacity: 1100-1500 riders per hour
- G-force: 3
- Height restriction: 54 in (137 cm)
- Trains: Two (Great America) or three (Over Georgia and Great Adventure) trains, with seven (Over Georgia) or eight (Great America or Great Adventure) cars. Riders are arranged four across in one row for a total of 28 (Over Georgia) or 32 (Great America or Great Adventure) riders per train.
- Fast Lane available

Superman: Ultimate Flight is the name of three flying roller coasters currently operating at three Six Flags amusement parks in the United States, those being Six Flags Over Georgia, Six Flags Great Adventure and Six Flags Great America. Each of these steel coasters were designed and built by Swiss manufacturer Bolliger & Mabillard and opened in 2002 and 2003. Themed to the popular comic book character, Superman: Ultimate Flight simulates flying by positioning its passengers parallel to the track, supported by harnesses and facing the ground through most of the ride. In the station, riders board the train sitting down. After the train is locked and checked, the trains are raised into the flying position. After the ride, the seats are lowered back into the sitting position.

== History ==
The first flying roller coaster, in which passengers ride parallel with the track, was launched in 1997 at Granada Studios Tour as Skytrak Total. Shortly after, Bolliger & Mabillard began designing their own flying roller coaster. In January 2002, both Alton Towers in the United Kingdom and Six Flags Over Georgia in the United States announced their intentions to build Bolliger & Mabillard "Flying Coasters". On March 16, 2002, Alton Towers opened the first installation, Air. Less than a month later, Superman: Ultimate Flight opened at Six Flags Over Georgia in Austell, Georgia.

Six Flags ordered two more versions of the attraction for the 2003 season for Six Flags Great Adventure in Jackson Township, New Jersey and Six Flags Great America in Gurnee, Illinois. Six Flags Great Adventure's version of the ride officially opened to the public on April 17, 2003. In preparation for the ride's installation at Six Flags Great America, the park removed Shockwave, an Arrow Dynamics roller coaster that was located on part of the park's parking lot. Grading works also had to take place to convert the parking lot into something more suitable for Superman: Ultimate Flight. The ride at Six Flags Great America opened on May 3, 2003.

In 2006, a clone of the Superman: Ultimate Flight installations opened as Crystal Wing at the Happy Valley amusement park in Beijing, China.

In 2019, the Great Adventure installation's rails were repainted red.

== Characteristics ==
While all three Superman: Ultimate Flight roller coasters are the same model, there are some differences between them. All three feature a top height of 106 feet (32 m) and a 100-foot (30 m) first drop. They all reach a top speed of 51 miles per hour (82 km/h) and feature two inversions. Superman: Ultimate Flight's signature element is its 78-foot-tall (24 m) pretzel loop; it was the first roller coaster in the world to feature one. A single cycle of the ride takes nearly 3 minutes to complete.

The original version at Six Flags Over Georgia features a dual-platform loading station, permitting three trains to operate simultaneously. Each train has seven cars, with each car carrying four riders side-by-side in a single row. The other two versions use a more standard single-platform loading station. While this allows a maximum of only two trains to operate at a time, each train compensates by having one additional row for a total of eight rows per train.

The length of the ride also varies between the locations. Both the Georgia and New Jersey installations feature a track length of 2,759 feet (841 m), while the Illinois version features a track length of 2,798 feet (853 m). The ride reaches its maximum speed of 51 miles per hour (82 km/h) at the bottom of the 78 foot tall (24m) pretzel loop, not on the first drop because the ride dives slightly below ground level.

The New Jersey and Illinois versions were also built on what used to be sections of parking lot. Georgia's version was built on hilly terrain, and hence there is a short tunnel when the track enters the 270 degree helix leading into the heartline roll. All three roller coasters were manufactured by Clermont Steel Fabricators located in Batavia, Ohio.

As its name suggests, Superman: Ultimate Flight is themed after DC Comics' Superman character. The track of all three rides is red, with yellow rails and blue supports. The rides' queues are contained within each ride's footprint and contain various elements of Superman theming. The installations at Six Flags Great America and Six Flag Great Adventure have dedicated gift shops near the ride's exit that sell a variety of DC Comics merchandise.

== Experience ==
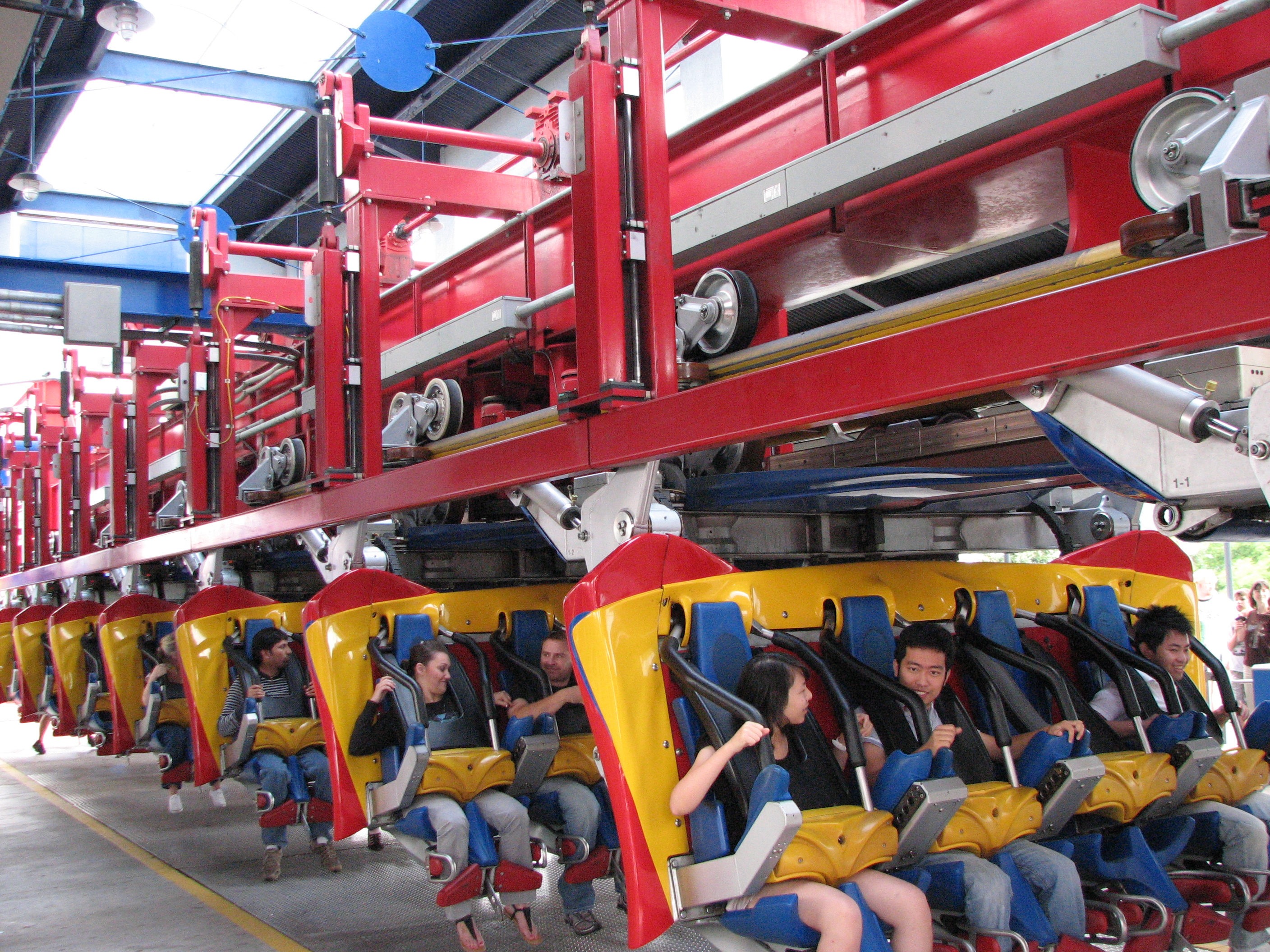
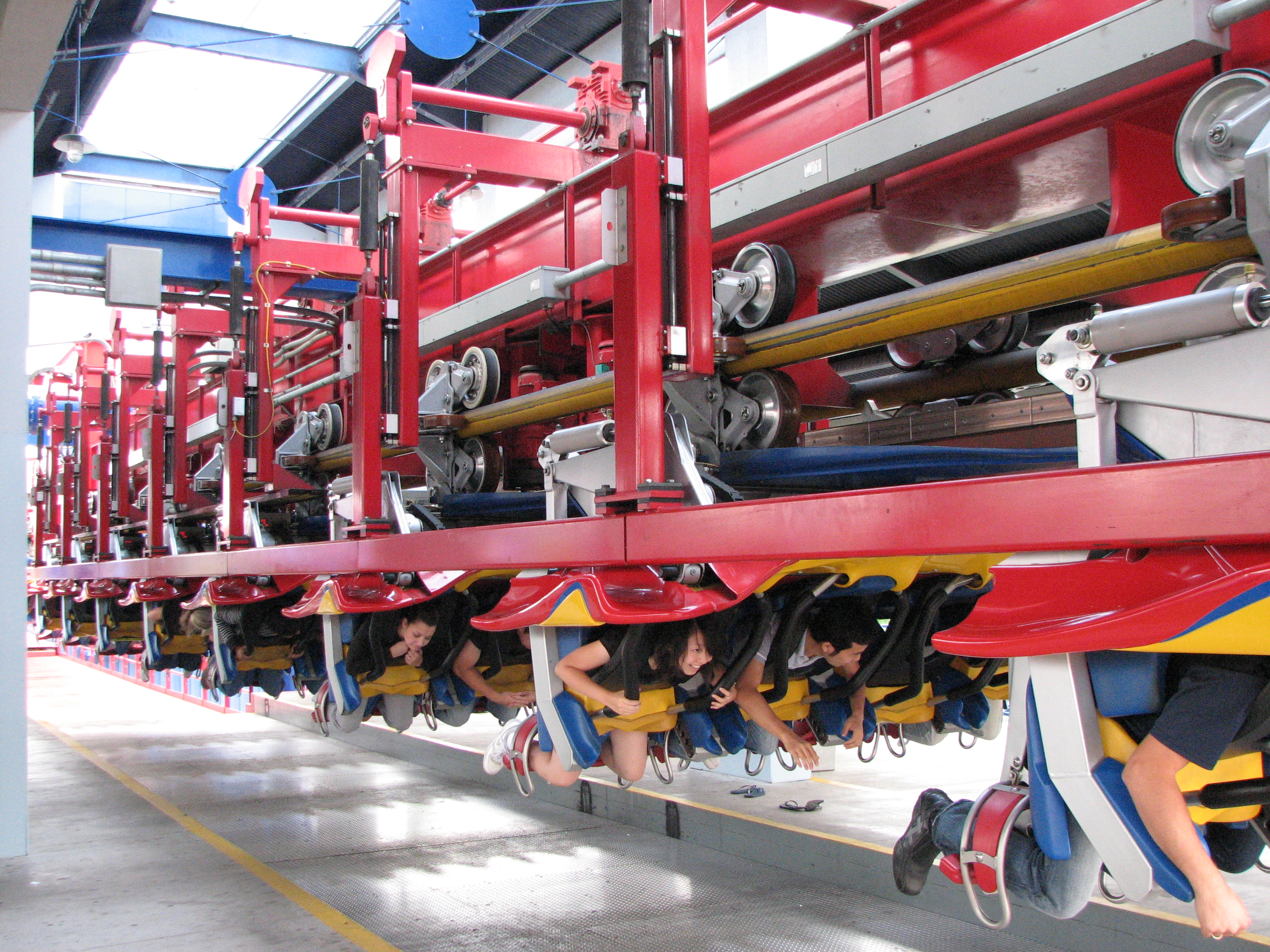
A train at Six Flags Great America in the loading position (left) and flying position (right)

=== Station and loading ===
Once in the station, riders of Superman: Ultimate Flight board a train sitting down, in a similar style to inverted roller coasters. Riders are restrained through a padded over-the-shoulder harness and a lap bar. At the ankles, two flaps hold the legs in position and close as the harness is locked in place. After the train is fully locked and checked, the trains are raised into the flying position and depart the station.

=== Layout ===
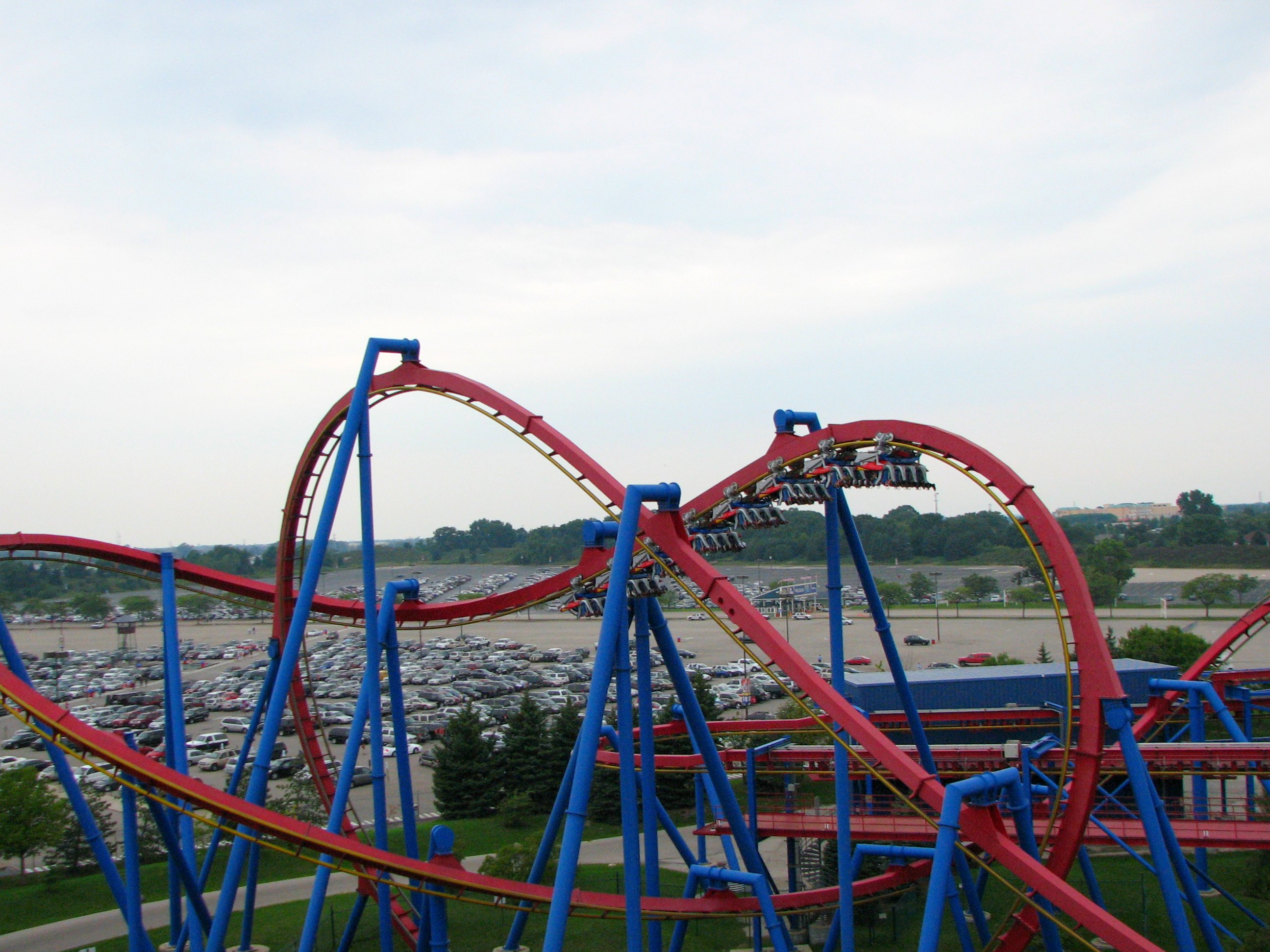
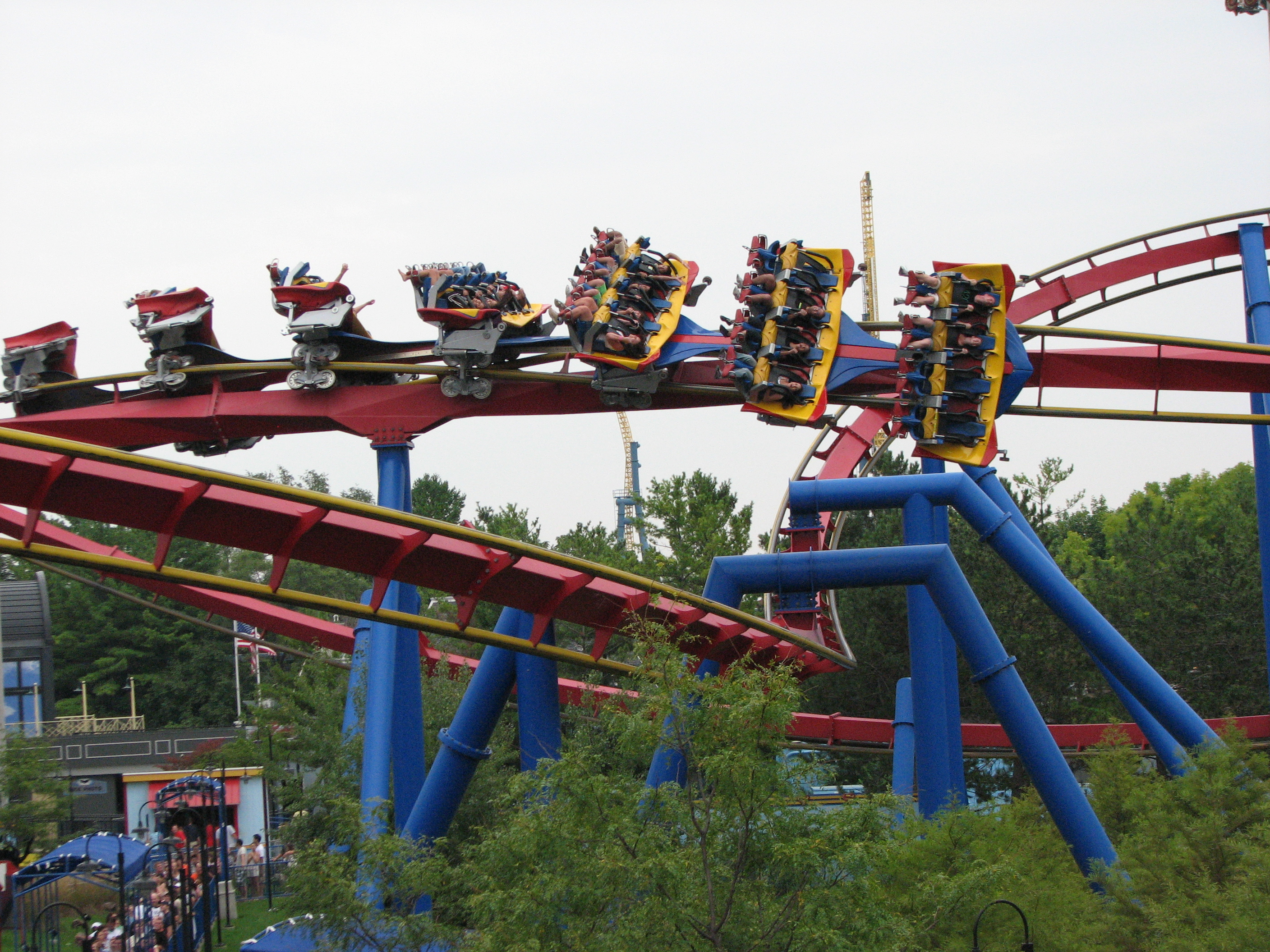
Trains at Six Flags Great America exiting the pretzel loop (left) and navigating the inline twist (right)

Superman: Ultimate Flight begins as the train turns to the right and begins to climb the 106-foot-tall (32 m) chain lift hill. After cresting the top of the lift hill, the train drops 100 feet (30 m) to the right at a 50-degree-angle, reaching a top speed of 51 miles per hour (82 km/h) and preparing to enter the pretzel loop. In a pretzel loop, a train swoops up to a height of 78 feet (24 m) before diving toward the ground, looping back under the starting point. At the bottom of the loop, riders face upward and experience strong, positive g forces. To complete the pretzel loop, the train climbs back to the top of the element, parallel to where it started. After exiting the element, the train then enters a 270-degree turn to the left, dropping back through the middle of the pretzel loop.

Next, the train passes through two consecutive horseshoe turns, first to the right and then to the left. As the name suggests, Horseshoe turns are highly banked horseshoe-shaped turns which feature track entering from roughly the same direction as where it exits. As the train exits the second horseshoe, it swoops down and begins a 270-degree helix to the right, which leads into the ride's second inversion, an inline twist. The inline twist sees riders perform a full rotation around the track, starting from a position where they are facing downward. After completing the twist, the train reaches the brake run and a final right-hand turn that leads back into the station.

== Reception ==
Superman: Ultimate Flight was generally well received. Arthur Levine from About.com rated the ride four out of five stars, describing the flying sensation as wonderful. He also praised Six Flags for the choice of theme, saying, "the Superman theme is ideally suited for the flying concept and adds a nice touch". Alex Bove of Ultimate Rollercoaster also reviewed the ride favorably: "From its comfortable restraints, silky ride and delightful pacing to its avian aesthetics, Superman: Ultimate Flight demonstrates B&M's unmatched attention to detail and their genuine desire to create enjoyable rides that surprise us over and over again". Jeremy Thompson of Roller Coaster Philosophy compared the ride unfavorably to Batman: The Ride, which also appears at all three parks: "Batman is gritty and intense and based on quick variations in the layout, while Superman is graceful and slower paced, based on creating a singular flight sensation, and quite honestly it's all a tad boring". However, he added that the "flying position does transform the ride experience into something relatively different from the rest".

In Amusement Today's annual Golden Ticket Awards, Superman: Ultimate Flight was ranked in the top-50 steel roller coasters numerous times since its opening. It peaked at position 35 in 2004, before dropping off the poll in 2007.

Golden Ticket Awards: Top Steel Roller Coasters
Year	2002	2003	2004	2005	2006	2007
Ranking	33	38	35	45	49	N/A
