= History of the roller coaster =

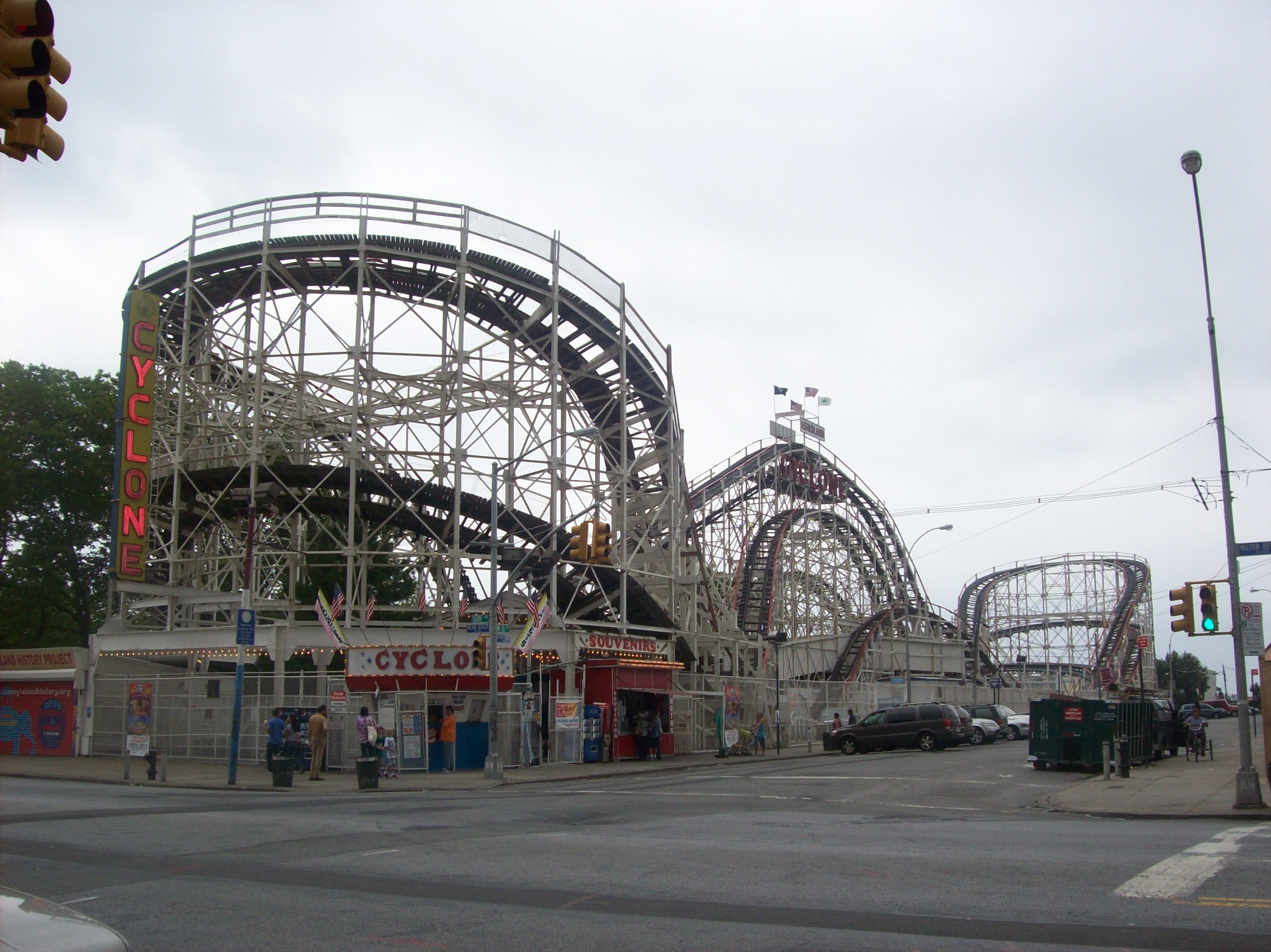
Coney Island Cyclone in Brooklyn was built in 1927 and refurbished in 1975

Roller coaster amusement rides have origins which date back to ice slides constructed in 18th-century Russia. Early technology featured sleds or wheeled carts that were sent down hills of ice reinforced by wooden supports. The technology evolved in the 19th century to feature railroad track using wheeled cars that were securely locked to the track. Newer innovations emerged in the early 20th century with side friction and underfriction wheel technologies to allow for greater speeds and sharper turns. By the mid-to-late 20th century, these elements intensified with the introduction of steel roller coaster designs and the ability to invert riders.

== History ==
=== Beginnings ===
The world's oldest roller coasters descended from the "Russian mountains", which were hills of ice built in the 17th century for the purpose of sliding, located in the gardens of palaces around the Russian capital, Saint Petersburg. Other languages also reference Russian mountains when referring to roller coasters, such as the Spanish montaña rusa, the Italian montagne russe, and the French montagnes russes. The Russian term for roller coaster, американские горки (amerikanskie gorki), translates literally as "American mountains".

The recreational attractions were called katalnaya gorka (Катальная Горка) or "sliding mountain" in Russian. Most were built with a height of 70 to 80 feet (21 to 24 m), a 50-degree drop, and were reinforced by wooden supports on either side. The slides became popular with the Russian upper class. Catherine the Great of Russia constructed a summer version of the ride at her estate in the 18th century, which relied on wheeled carts that rode along grooved tracks instead of sleds.

The Riding Mountain (aka La Grande Glisade) entertainment pavilion designed by Bartolomeo Francesco Rastrelli for Tsarskoye Selo royal residence was built in 1754–1757. It was a huge building in the shape of rotunda. It had a trail with five hills which were covered with ice during the winter. In the summer, the trails featured wheeled trolleys secured in steel grooves mounted on the wooden trails. Due to a pendulum-like motion drawn from inertia, all five hills could be traversed in one ride. The ride was engineered by Russian scientist Andrey Nartov. The Anglican clergyman John Glen King mentioned that some Englishmen visiting Russia called them "Flying Mountains" and described them as follows:

You will observe that there are five mounts of unequal height: the first and the highest is full thirty feet (9 m) perpendicular altitude; the momentum with which they descend this carries them over the second, which is about five or six feet (1.5 or 1.8 m) lower, just sufficient to allow for the friction and resistance; and so on to the last, from which they are conveyed by a gentle descent, with nearly same velocity, over a piece of water into a little island. These slides, which are about a furlong and a half (300 m) in length, are made of wood, that may be used in summer as well as in winter. The process is, two of four persons fit in a little carriage and one stands behind, for more there are in it the greater the swiftness with which it goes; it runs on castors and in grooves to keep it on its right direction, and it descends with a wonderful rapidity. Under the hill, is a machine worked by horses for drawing the carriages back again, with the company in them. Such a work as this would have been enormous in most countries for the labour and expense in cost, as well as the vast quantity of wood used in it. At the same place, there is another artificial mount which goes in a spiral line, and in my opinion, for I have tried it also, is very disagreable; as it seems always leaning on one side, and the person feels in danger of falling out of seat.

Katalnaya gorka was dismantled in 1792–1795. Currently in its place is the Granite Terrace in the Catherine Park.

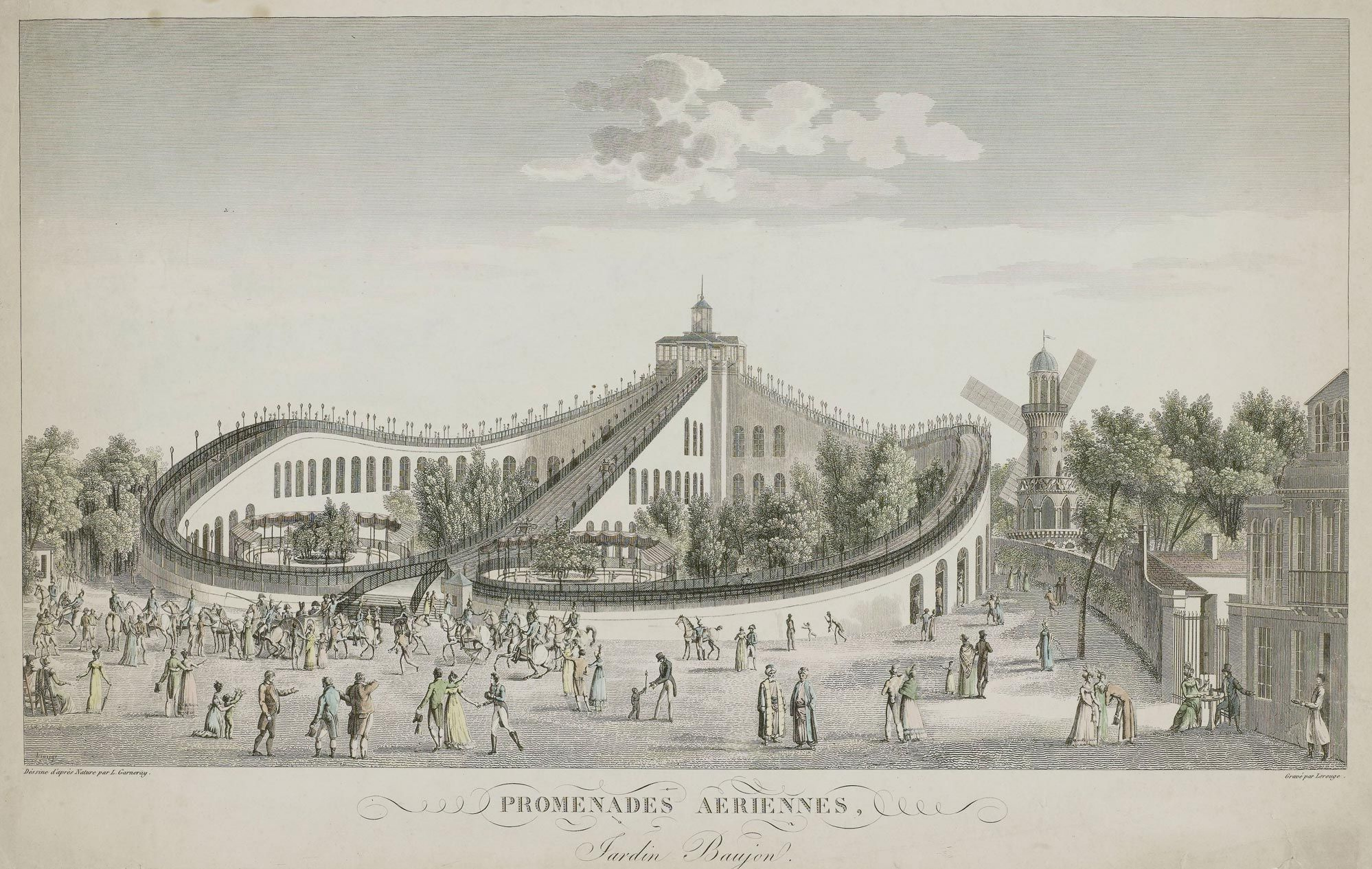
Promenades Aériennes in Paris, 1817

Russian soldiers occupying Paris from 1815 to 1816, after the defeat of Napoleon at Waterloo, may have introduced the Russian amusement of sledding down steep hills to the French. In July 1817, a French banker named Nicolas Beaujon opened Parc Beaujon, an amusement park on the Champs-Élysées. Its most famous attraction was the Promenades Aériennes or "Aerial Strolls". It featured wheeled cars securely locked to the track, guide rails to keep them on course, and higher speeds. The three-wheel carts were towed to the top of a tower, and released to descend two curving tracks on either side. King Louis XVIII came to see the park, but it is not recorded if he tried the ride. Before long, there were seven similar rides in Paris: Les Montagnes Françaises (The French Mountains), Le Delta, Les Montagnes de Belleville (The Mountains of Belleville), Les Montagnes Américaines (The American Mountains), Les Montages Lilliputiennes, (The Miniature Mountains), Les Montagnes Suisses (The Swiss Mountains), and Les Montagnes Égyptiennes (The Egyptian Mountains).

In the beginning, these attractions were primarily for the upper classes. In 1845, an amusement park called Tivoli Gardens opened in Copenhagen, which was meant for the middle class. These new parks featured roller coasters as permanent attractions. The first permanent coaster with a looping track was most likely also built in Paris from an English design in 1846, with a single-person wheeled sled running through a 13-foot (4 m) diameter vertical loop. These early single loop designs were called centrifugal railways. In 1887, a French entrepreneur, Joseph Oller, the owner of the Moulin Rouge music hall, built Les Montagnes Russes à Belleville (The Russian Mountains of Belleville) a permanent roller coaster with a length of 200 meters in the form of a double-eight, later enlarged to four figure-eight-shaped loops.

=== Scenic railways ===
In the 1850s, a mining company in Summit Hill, Pennsylvania, constructed the Mauch Chunk gravity railroad, a brakeman-controlled, 8.7-mile (14 km) downhill track used to deliver coal to Mauch Chunk (now known as Jim Thorpe), Pennsylvania. By 1872, the "Gravity Road", as it became known, was selling rides to thrill seekers. Railway companies used similar tracks to provide amusement on days when ridership was low.

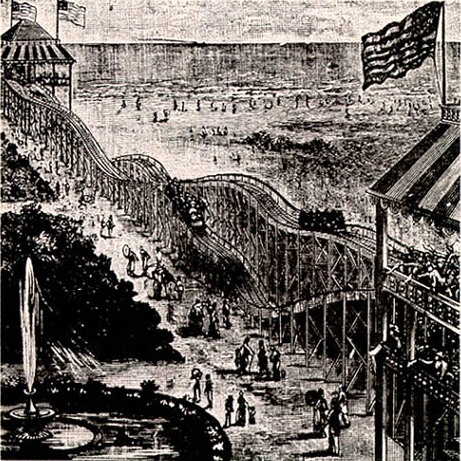
Thompson's Switchback Railway, 1884

Using this idea as a basis, LaMarcus Adna Thompson began work on a gravity Switchback Railway that opened at Coney Island in Brooklyn, New York in 1884. Passengers climbed to the top of a platform and rode a bench-like car down the 600 ft (180 m) track up to the top of another tower where the vehicle was switched to a return track and the passengers took the return trip. This track design was soon replaced with an oval complete circuit. In 1885, Phillip Hinkle introduced the first complete-circuit coaster with a lift hill, Gravity Pleasure Road, which became the most popular attraction at Coney Island. Not to be outdone, Thompson patented his design for a roller coaster that included dark tunnels with painted scenery in 1886. "Scenic Railways" were soon found in amusement parks across the county, with Frederick Ingersoll's construction company building many of them in the first two decades of the 20th century.

=== Growing popularity and innovations ===
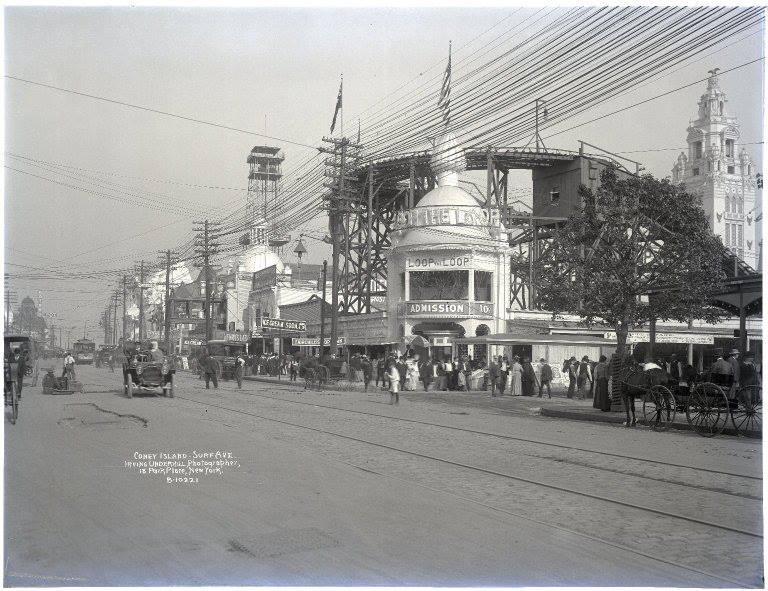
Loop the Loop, an early looping roller coaster at Coney Island, 1906

As roller coasters grew in popularity, experimentation in coaster dynamics took off. In the 1880s, the concept of a vertical loop was again explored by Lina Beecher, and in 1895 the concept came into fruition with Flip Flap Railway, located at Sea Lion Park in Brooklyn, and shortly afterward with Loop the Loop at Olentangy Park near Columbus, Ohio, as well as similar coasters in Atlantic City and Coney Island. The rides exerted dangerously high G-forces, and many passengers suffered whiplash. Both were soon dismantled, and looping coasters would disappear for half a century.

The oldest operating roller coaster, which originated during this time period, is Leap-The-Dips at Lakemont Park in Pennsylvania, a side friction roller coaster built in 1902. Blackpool Pleasure Beach's Big Dipper, built in 1923, is the oldest operating coaster in the United Kingdom following the closure of Dreamland Margate's Scenic Railway in 2026. Scenic Railway at Melbourne's Luna Park built in 1912, is the world's second-oldest roller coaster, and it also features a system where the brakeman rides the car with wheels.

By 1919, the first underfriction roller coaster had been developed by John A. Miller. Soon, roller coasters spread to amusement parks all around the world. One of the most well-known historical roller coasters, the Coney Island Cyclone, opened at Coney Island in 1927. Like Cyclone, most early roller coasters were made of wood. Many old wooden roller coasters are still operational, at parks such as Kennywood and Blackpool Pleasure Beach. One of only 13 remaining examples of John Miller's work worldwide is Roller Coaster at Lagoon in Utah. The coaster opened in 1921 and is the 6th oldest coaster in the world.

The Great Depression marked the end of the golden age of roller coasters, as amusement parks across the United States went into a decline that resulted in less demand for new coasters, as well as the closure of many parks and rides. This general slump lasted until 1972, when The Racer opened at Kings Island. Designed by John C. Allen, the instant success of The Racer helped to ignite a renaissance for roller coasters, reviving worldwide interest throughout the industry.

=== The rise of steel coasters ===
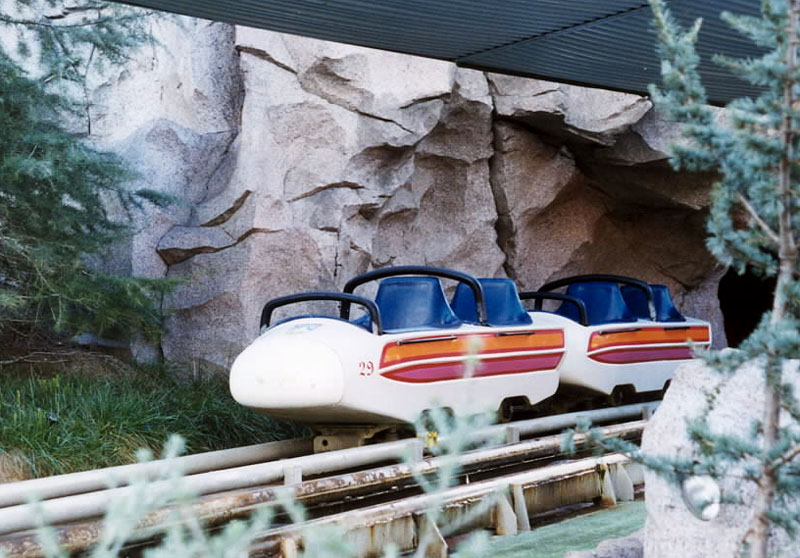
Matterhorn Bobsleds was the world's first tubular steel roller coaster

In 1959, the Disneyland theme park introduced a new design breakthrough in roller coasters with Matterhorn Bobsleds. This was the first roller coaster to use a tubular steel track. Unlike conventional wooden rails, which are generally formed using steel strips mounted on laminated wood, tubular steel can be bent in any direction, which allows designers to incorporate loops, corkscrews, and many other maneuvers into their designs. Most modern roller coasters are made of steel, although wooden roller coasters are still being built, along with hybrids of steel and wood.

In 1975, the first modern-day roller coaster with an inverting element opened: Corkscrew, located at Knott's Berry Farm in Buena Park, California. In 1976, the vertical loop made a comeback with Great American Revolution at Six Flags Magic Mountain in Valencia, California.

== Timeline of notable roller coasters ==
The roller coasters mentioned here are significant for their role in the amusement industry. They were notable for specific reasons, including:

- First roller coaster of a specific kind, style, manufacturing material or unique technology; ground-breaking
- First time a particular record-breaking threshold was crossed
- Historical significance

=== 1700 to 1799 ===
==== 1750s ====
- Francesco Bartolomeo Rastrelli builds a sophisticated summer and winter slide, Riding Mountain, for Russian empress Catherine the Great in Tsarskoye Selo, Russia. It featured two slides: a straight line with five "hills", and one was with a spiral trail. In the winter, the slides were covered in ice and were descended using sleds. In the summer, they used cars on wheels locked in tracks. The ride was engineered by Andrey Nartov.

==== 1784 ====
- Catherine the Great has a summer version of the "Russian mountain" slides, featuring sleds with wheels, built at her estate in Oranienbaum near St. Petersburg.

=== 1800 to 1899 ===
==== 1817 ====
- First roller coaster featuring cars that locked onto the track, first roller coaster to feature two cars racing or dueling with each other: Les Montagnes Russes à Belleville (Russian Mountains of Belleville) in Paris.
- First complete-circuit roller coaster: Promenades Aériennes (Aerial Walk) in Paris.

==== 1827 ====
- First scenic gravity railroad: Mauch Chunk Switchback Railway in Jim Thorpe, Pennsylvania.
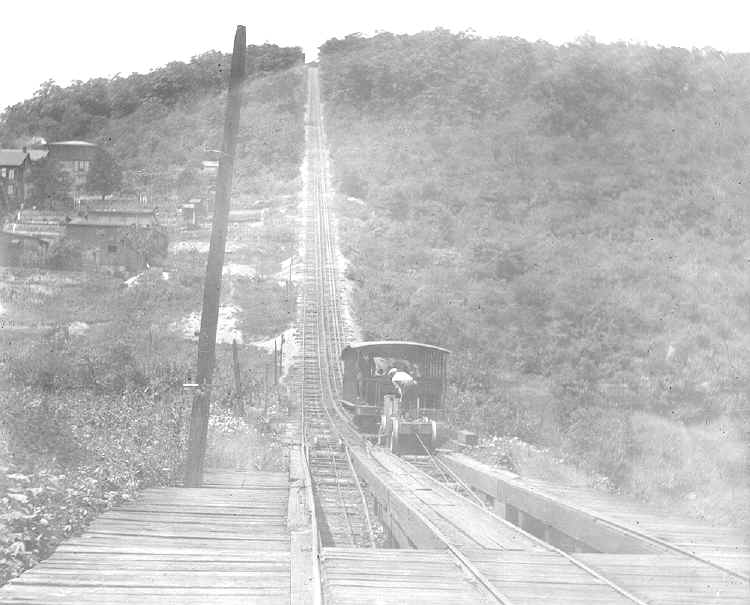
  Mount Pisgah and the Mauch Chunk Switchback Railway

==== 1846 ====
- First inversion on a roller coaster: Centrifugal Railway at Frascati Garden, Paris.

==== 1885 ====
- First use of powered chain lift: Gravity Pleasure Road at Coney Island, Brooklyn, New York.

==== 1896 ====
- First known inversion on a wooden roller coaster: Flip Flap Railway at Coney Island.

=== 1900 to 1970 ===
==== 1902 ====
- Leap-The-Dips opens at Lakemont Park, Altoona, Pennsylvania. It is currently the world's oldest standing wooden roller coaster, though it has not operated since 2023.
- First suspended roller coaster: Bisby's Spiral Airship at Queens Park, Long Beach, California.

==== 1904 ====
- Philadelphia Toboggan Coasters opens their first six roller coasters.

==== 1907 ====
- First use of a lap bar: Drop the Dip at Coney Island.

==== 1908 ====
- First spinning roller coaster: Virginia Reel at Luna Park, Coney Island.

==== 1913 ====
- First roller coaster with a Möbius-style track: Derby Racer at Euclid Beach Park, Cleveland, Ohio.

==== 1920 ====
- First roller coaster to utilize upstop wheels: Jack Rabbit at Seabreeze Amusement Park, Rochester, New York.

==== 1921 ====
- First roller coaster designed by Mack Rides: Szenerie-Bergbahn, a traveling roller coaster.

==== 1925 ====
- First roller coaster to reach 100 feet in height: Cyclone at Revere Beach, Revere, Massachusetts.

==== 1926 ====
- First indoor roller coaster: Twister, Coney Island, Cincinnati, Ohio.

==== 1928 ====
- Montaña Suiza opens at Parque de Atracciones Monte Igueldo in San Sebastián, Guipúzcoa, Basque Country. It is currently the world's oldest operating steel roller coaster.

==== 1929 ====
- First bobsled coaster: Flying Turns at Lakeside Park, Dayton, Ohio.

==== 1930s ====
- The first wild mouse coasters begin to appear across the United States.

==== 1935 ====
- First wooden roller coaster relocation: Greyhound at Canobie Lake Park, Salem, New Hampshire.

==== 1946 ====
- First coaster designed by Allan Herschell Company with a known opening year: Little Dipper at Enchanted Island Amusement Park, Phoenix, Arizona.

==== 1952 ====
- First junior roller coaster: Little Dipper at Memphis Kiddie Park, Brooklyn, Ohio. It is currently the world's oldest operating junior roller coaster.

==== 1959 ====
- Matterhorn Bobsleds opens at Disneyland, Anaheim, California. It was the first tubular steel roller coaster, and is thus also the world's oldest operating tubular steel coaster. It was also the first coaster designed by Arrow Dynamics.

==== 1966 ====
- First mine train roller coaster: Runaway Mine Train at Six Flags Over Texas, Arlington, Texas.

=== 1970s ===
==== 1975 ====
- First modern roller coaster with inversions: Corkscrew at Knott's Berry Farm, Buena Park, California.
- First modern suspended roller coaster: Alpen-Flug at Oktoberfest, Munich, Bavaria.

==== 1976 ====
- First modern roller coaster with a vertical loop: Revolution at Six Flags Magic Mountain, Valencia, California.
- First roller coaster with three inversions: Corkscrew at Cedar Point, Sandusky, Ohio, United States.

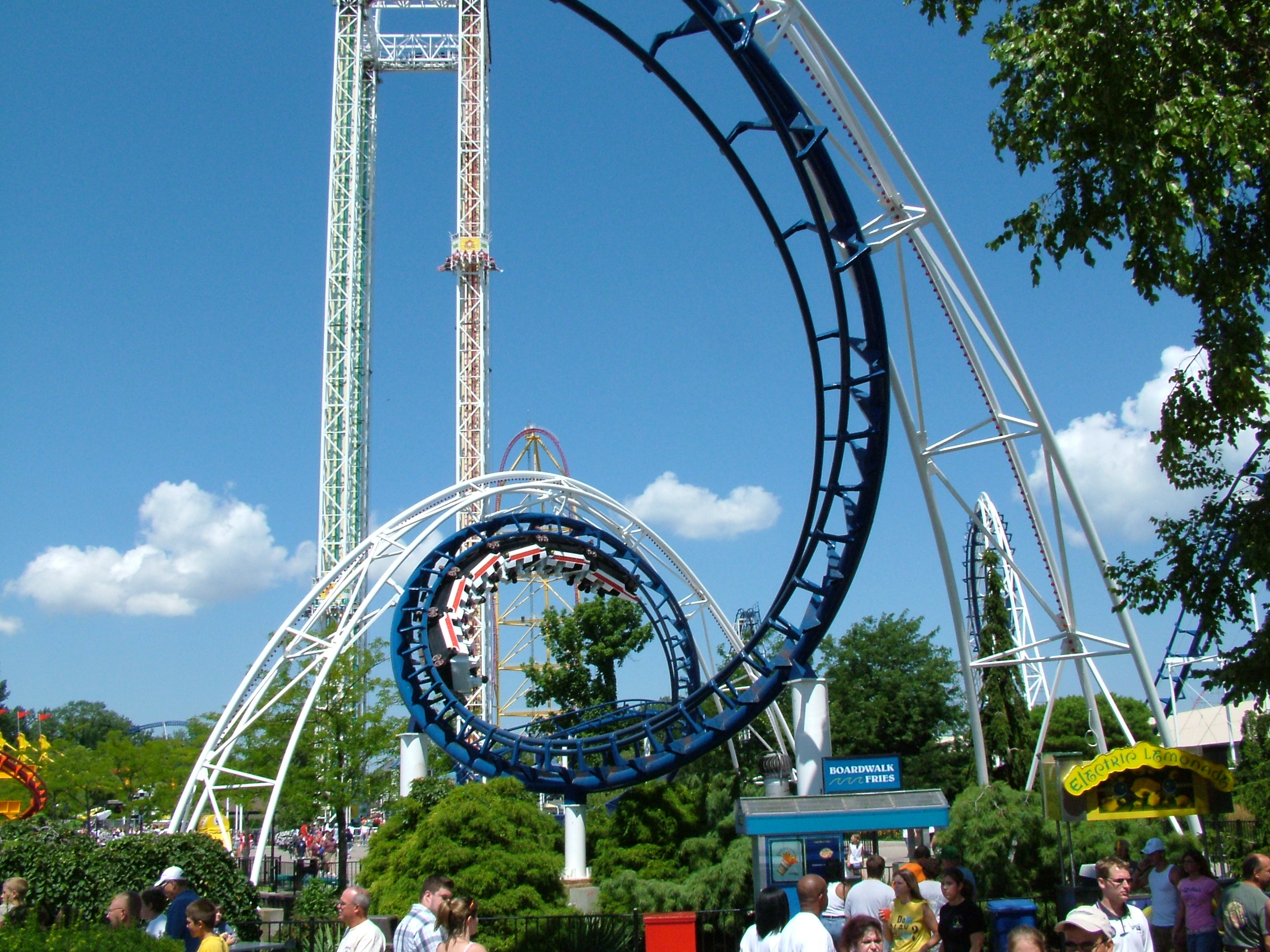
Corkscrew at Cedar Point was the first roller coaster with three inversions

==== 1977 ====
- First shuttle roller coaster: Although six shuttle coasters opened in 1977, White Lightnin' at Carowinds, Charlotte, North Carolina, is likely to have opened first, given the park's southern location and longer operating season.
- First roller coaster with two consecutive vertical loops: Double Loop at Geauga Lake, Aurora, Ohio.

==== 1978 ====
- First roller coaster with interlocking loops: Loch Ness Monster at Busch Gardens Williamsburg, Williamsburg, Virginia.
- First roller coaster to feature a flywheel launch system: Montezooma's Revenge at Knott's Berry Farm.

==== 1979 ====
- The Beast opens at Kings Island, Mason, Ohio as the tallest, fastest and longest wooden roller coaster. Currently, it is still the longest wooden roller coaster in the world.
- First roller coaster designed by Intamin: Jr. Gemini at Cedar Point, Sandusky, Ohio.
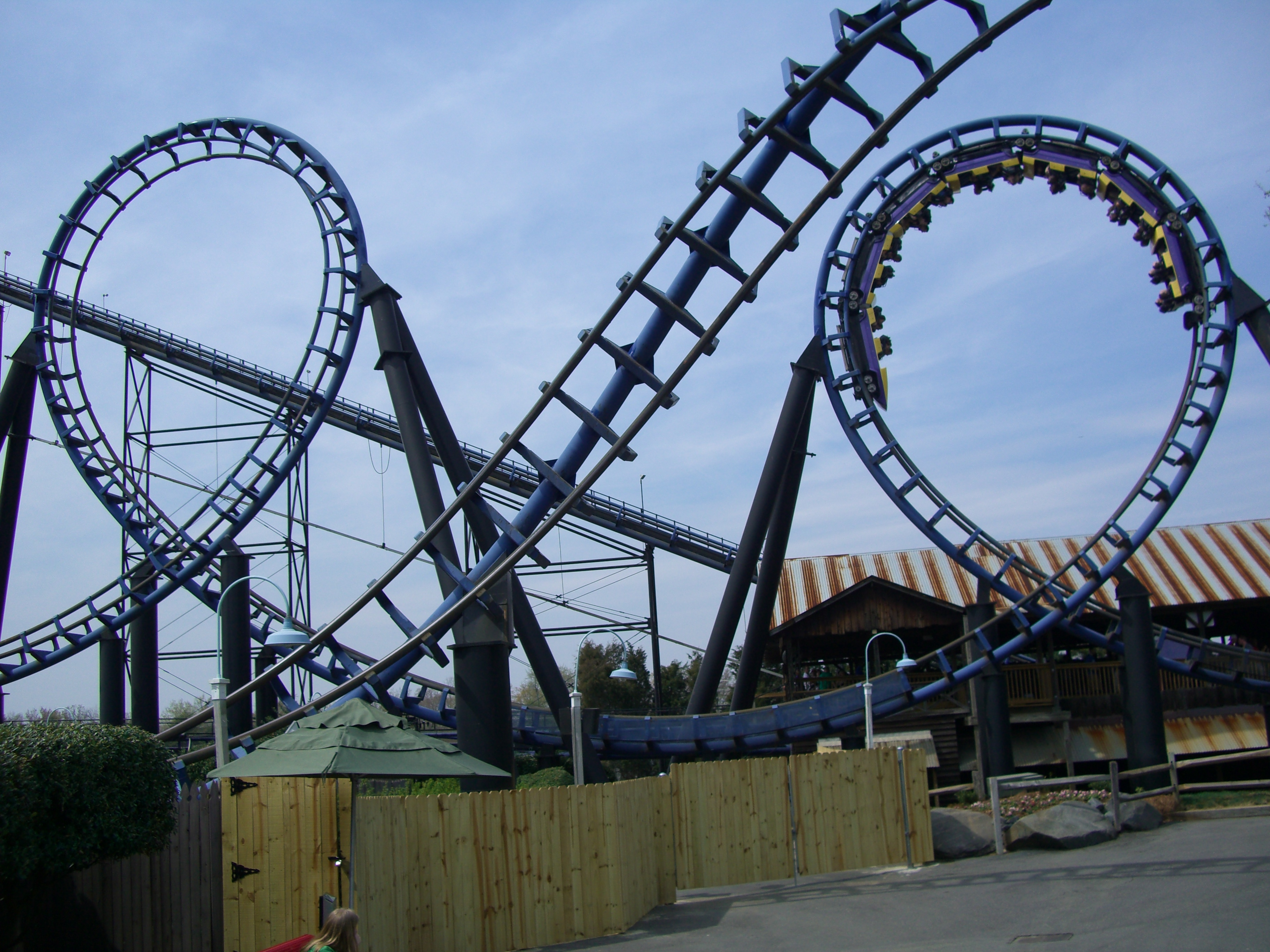
  Carolina Cyclone at Carowinds was the first roller coaster to feature four inversions

=== 1980s ===
==== 1980 ====
- First roller coaster with four inversions: Carolina Cyclone at Carowinds.

==== 1981 ====
- First roller coaster designed by Vekoma: Python at Efteling, Kaatsheuvel.
- First permanent suspended roller coaster: The Bat at Kings Island.

==== 1982 ====
- First roller coaster with five inversions: Viper at Six Flags Darien Lake, Darien, New York.
- First roller coaster to operate vehicles in reverse: The Racer at Kings Island.
- First stand-up roller coaster: Dangai at Thrill Valley, Gotemba, Shizuoka.

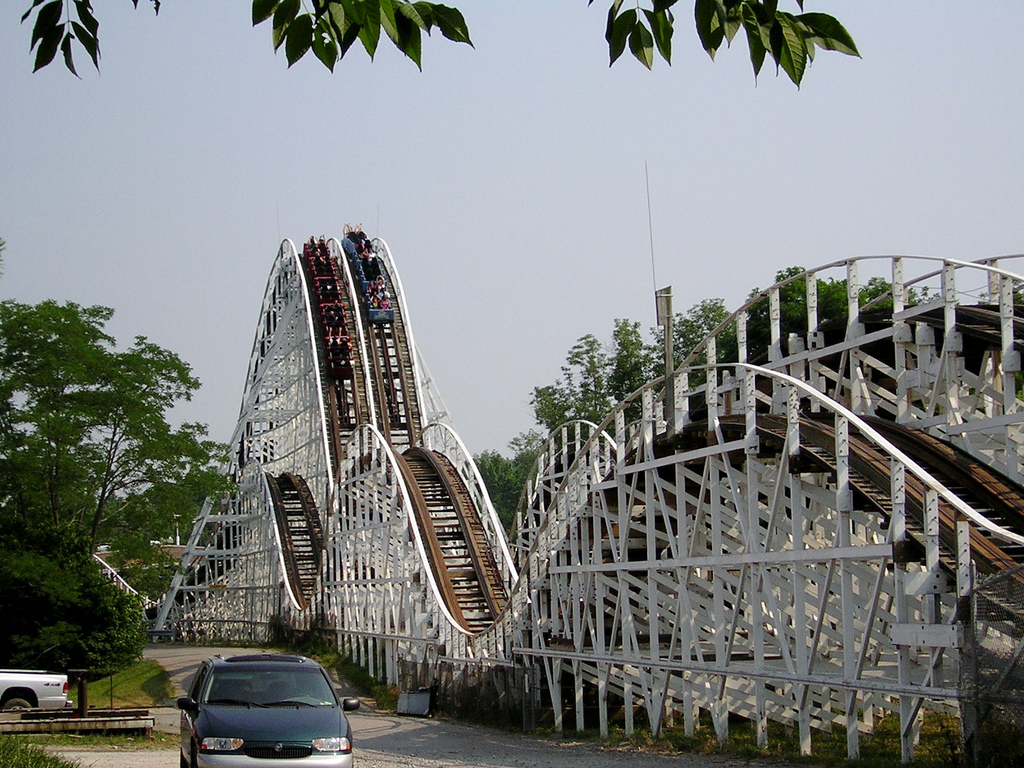
The Racer at Kings Island was the first roller coaster to operate vehicles in reverse

==== 1983 ====
- First alpine roller coaster: Ice Mountain Bobsleds at Enchanted Forest, Turner, Oregon.
- First shuttle roller coaster to exceed 200 feet (61 m) in height, most G-force ever exerted on a roller coaster (6.5 Gs): Moonsault Scramble at Fuji-Q Highland, Fujiyoshida, Yamanashi.

==== 1984 ====
- First Boomerang roller coaster: Boomerang at Bellewaerde, Zonnebeke (it was the second to be built, but the first to open to the public.)
- First steel bobsled coaster: Sarajevo Bobsleds at Six Flags Magic Mountain.
- First roller coaster designed by Zamperla with a known opening year: Dragon at Midway State Park in Maple Springs, New York.

==== 1985 ====
- First pipeline roller coaster, first roller coaster with a heartline roll: Ultra Twister at Nagashima Spa Land, Mie Prefecture.

==== 1987 ====
- First roller coaster with six inversions: Vortex at Kings Island.

==== 1988 ====
- First roller coaster with seven inversions: Shockwave at Six Flags Great America, Gurnee, Illinois.

==== 1989 ====
- First complete-circuit roller coaster to exceed 200 feet (61 m) in height: Magnum XL-200 at Cedar Point.

=== 1990s ===
==== 1990 ====
- First roller coaster designed by Bolliger & Mabillard: Iron Wolf at Six Flags Great America.

==== 1992 ====
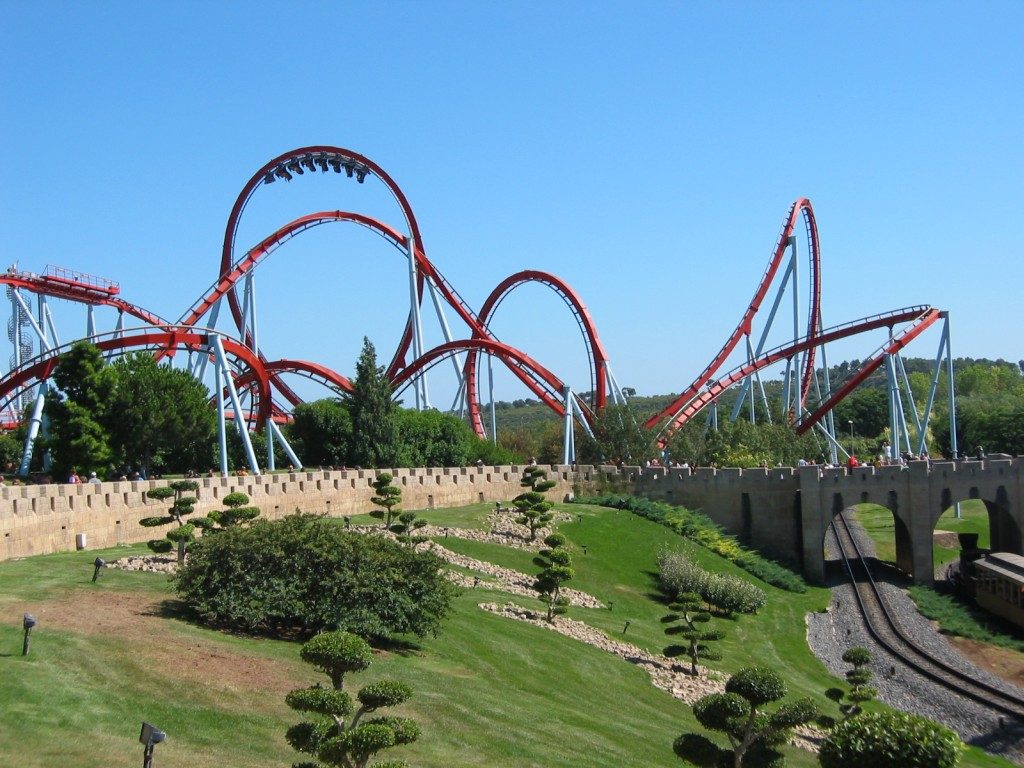
Dragon Khan at PortAventura Park, the first roller coaster to feature eight inversions

- First inverted roller coaster: Batman: The Ride at Six Flags Great America.
- First roller coaster with a cutback inversion: Drachen Fire at Busch Gardens Williamsburg.
- First roller coaster designed by Custom Coasters International: Sky Princess at Dutch Wonderland, Lancaster, Pennsylvania.

==== 1995 ====
- First roller coaster with eight inversions: Dragon Khan at PortAventura Park, Tarragona.
- First use of synchronized on-board audio: Casey Jr. – Le Petit Train du Cirque at Disneyland Park, Paris.

==== 1996 ====
- First roller coasters to use a linear motor electromagnetic propulsion system, first roller coasters designed by Premier Rides: Flight of Fear, at both Kings Island and Kings Dominion, Doswell, Virginia.
- First roller coaster designed by Great Coasters International: Wildcat at Hersheypark, Hershey, Pennsylvania.
- First roller coaster to use an elevator lift: Rail Chase: The Ride at Tokyo Joyopolis in Minato, Tokyo, and Batflyer at Lightwater Valley, Ripon, North Yorkshire.

==== 1997 ====
- First shuttle roller coaster to reach speeds of 100 miles per hour (160 km/h): Tower of Terror at Dreamworld, Gold Coast, Queensland.
- First shuttle roller coaster to exceed 400 feet (120 m) in height: Superman: Escape from Krypton at Six Flags Magic Mountain.
- First flying roller coaster: Skytrak at Granada Studios, Manchester.

==== 1998 ====
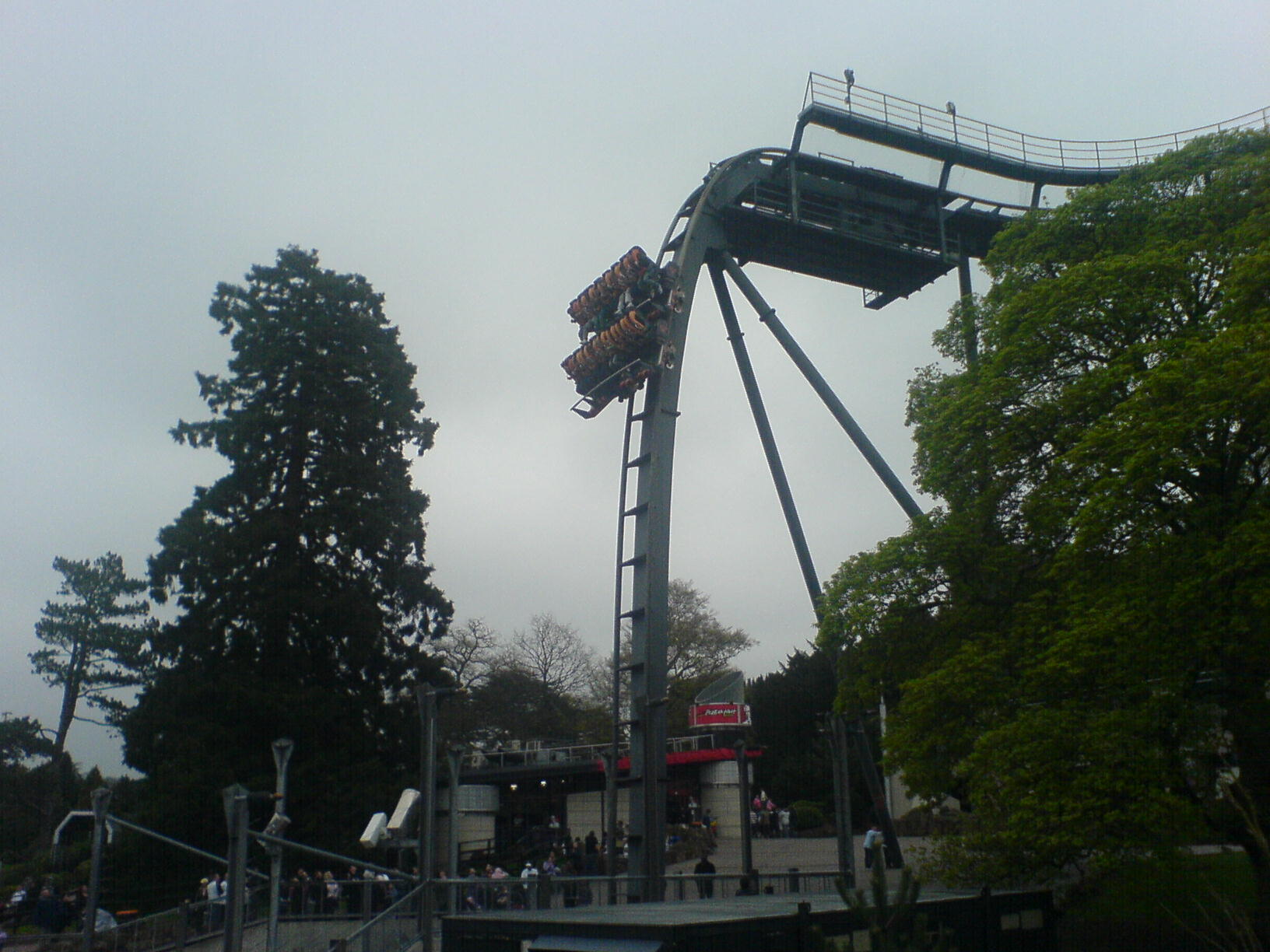
Oblivion at Alton Towers was the first Dive Coaster

- First dive coaster: Oblivion at Alton Towers, Alton, Staffordshire.
- First roller coaster designed by Gerstlauer: G'sengte Sau at Erlebnispark Tripsdrill, Cleebron, Baden-Württemberg.

==== 1999 ====
- First floorless roller coaster: Medusa at Six Flags Great Adventure, Jackson, New Jersey.
- Montezum opens at Hopi Hari, Vinhedo, São Paulo as the tallest and fastest roller coaster in South America.

=== 2000s ===
==== 2000 ====
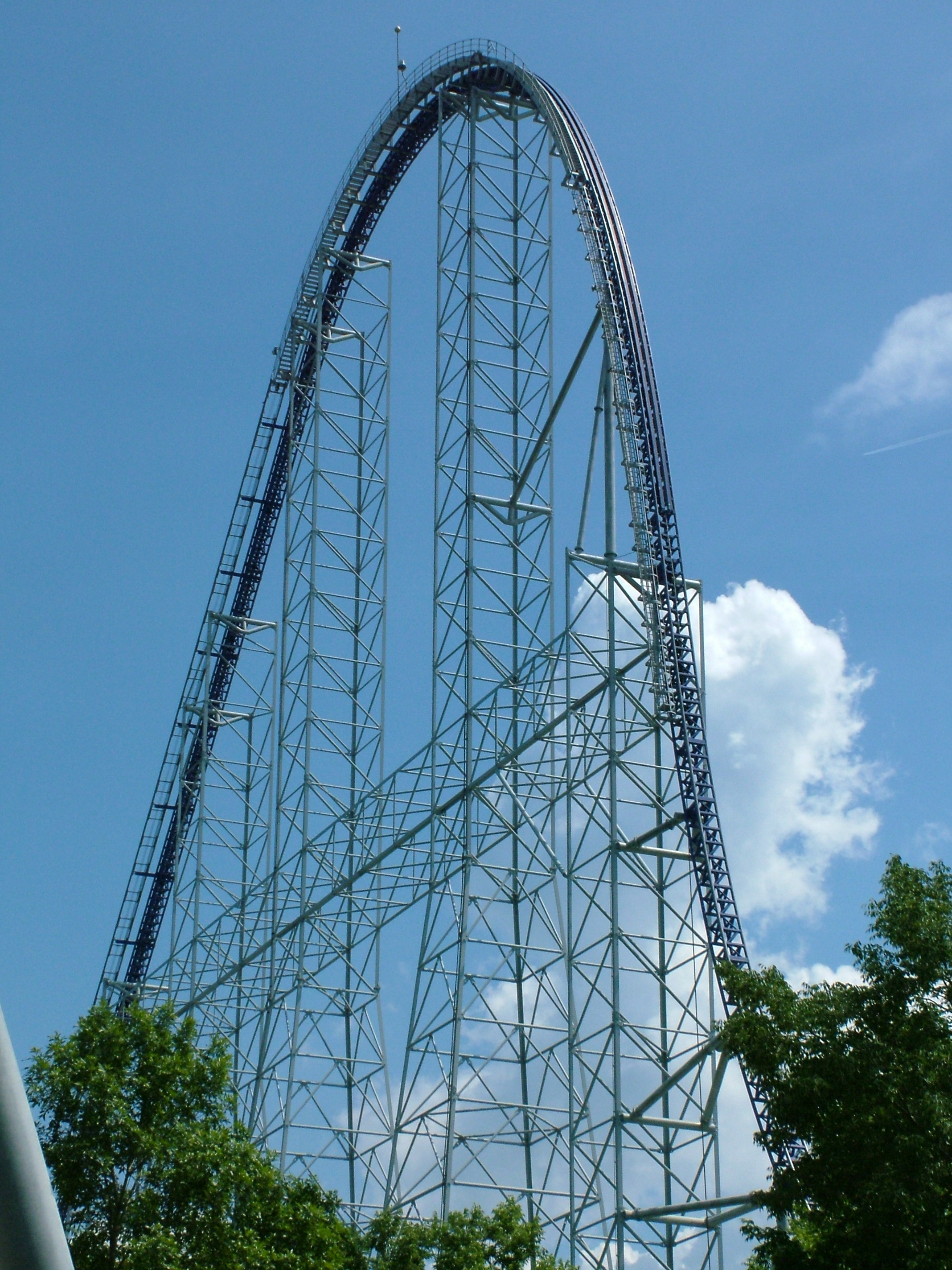
Millennium Force at Cedar Point was the first complete-circuit roller coaster to exceed 300 feet (91 m) in height, and the first to use an elevator cable lift

- First complete-circuit roller coaster to exceed 300 feet (91 m) in height (also known as a giga coaster), first roller coaster to use an elevator cable lift system: Millennium Force at Cedar Point.
- First modern wooden roller coaster with an inversion, first wooden roller coaster to exceed 200 feet (61 m) in height: Son of Beast at Kings Island (after an accident on July 9, 2006, the loop was removed.)
- First large-scale flying roller coaster: Stealth at California's Great America, Santa Clara, California.
- First interactive water coaster: Flying Super Saturator at Carowinds.
- Steel Dragon 2000 opens at Nagashima Spa Land as the tallest roller coaster in Asia, as well as the longest roller coaster in the world.

==== 2001 ====
- First roller coaster with a 90° vertical drop, first complete-circuit roller coaster to exceed speeds of 100 miles per hour (160 km/h), fastest roller coaster acceleration: Dodonpa at Fuji-Q Highland (the vertical drop was removed in favor of a vertical loop in 2017.)
- First roller coaster to use a pneumatic propulsion system, first roller coaster designed by S&S – Sansei Technologies: Hypersonic XLC at Kings Dominion.
- First roller coaster to feature both a lift hill and propulsion system: California Screamin' (now Incredicoaster) at Disney California Adventure, Anaheim, California.
- Tower of Terror opens at Gold Reef City in Johannesburg as the tallest roller coaster in Africa, as well as having the highest G-force of any roller coaster currently operating (6.3 Gs).

==== 2002 ====
- First roller coaster to use a hydraulic propulsion system: Xcelerator at Knott's Berry Farm.
- First roller coaster with ten inversions: Colossus at Thorpe Park, Chertsey, Surrey.
- First 4th dimension roller coaster: X (now X2) at Six Flags Magic Mountain.
- First tilt section on a roller coaster: Winja's Fear & Force at Phantasialand, Brühl, Rhineland.
- First tilt roller coaster: Gravity Max at Lihpao Land, Houli, Taichung.

==== 2003 ====
- First complete-circuit roller coaster to exceed 400 feet (120 m) in height (also known as a strata coaster): Top Thrill Dragster (now Top Thrill 2) at Cedar Point.
- First roller coaster with a beyond vertical drop, first roller coaster to utilize a vertical lift: Vild-Svinet at BonBon-Land, Zealand.

==== 2004 ====
- First coaster with a "fly-through" element in its station: Thunderhead at Dollywood, Pigeon Forge, Tennessee.

==== 2005 ====
- Kingda Ka opens as the tallest and fastest roller coaster in the world, and the second strata coaster, at Six Flags Great Adventure. It would retain its height record for its entire lifespan.
- First roller coaster designed by The Gravity Group: Hades at Mt. Olympus Water & Theme Park Resort, Wisconsin Dells, Wisconsin.
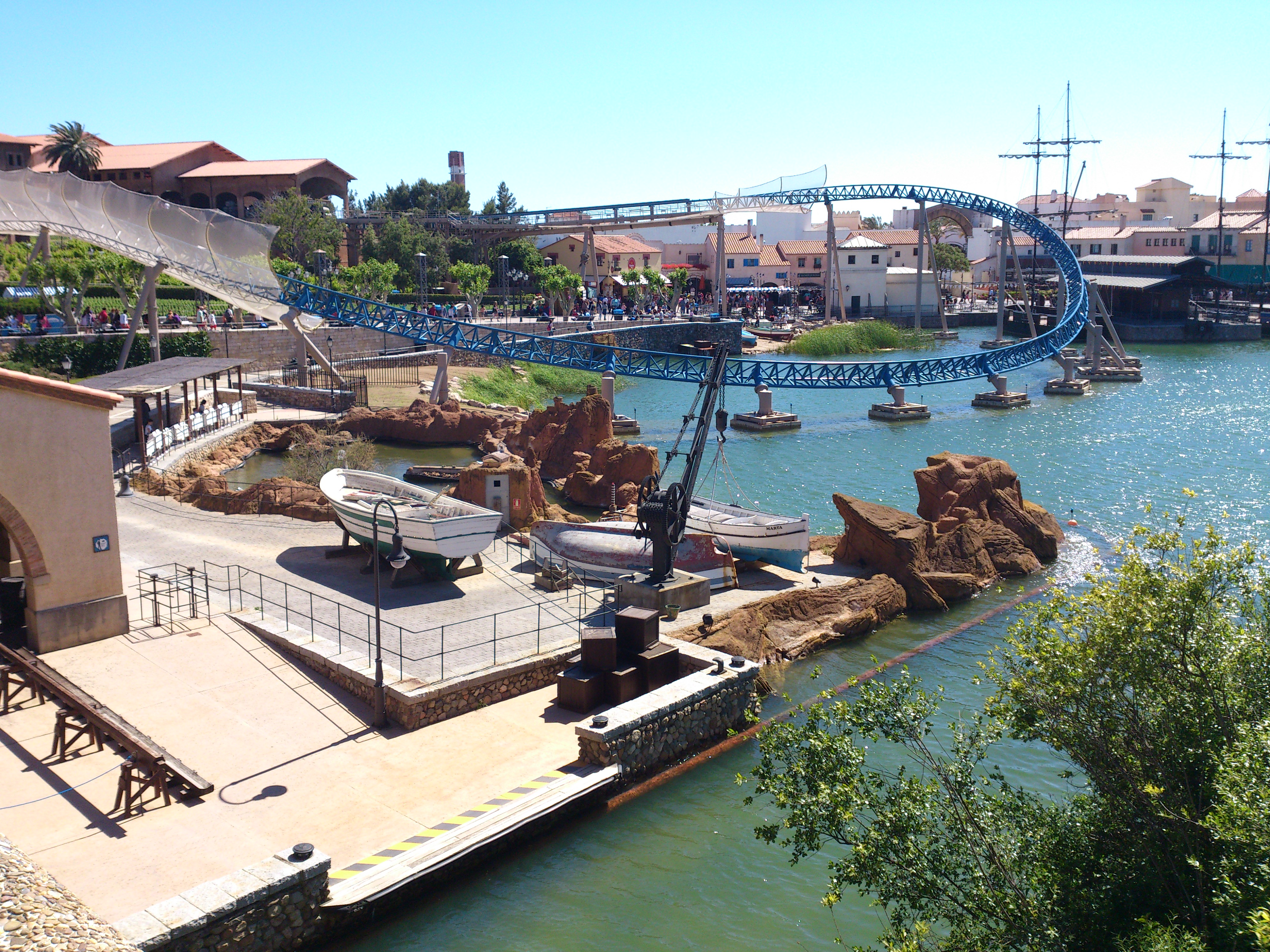
  Furius Baco at PortAventura Park was the first Wing Coaster

==== 2007 ====
- First wing roller coaster: Furius Baco at PortAventura Park.

==== 2008 ====
- First roller coaster with a ferris wheel-style lift hill: Maximum RPM! (later Roundabout) at Freestyle Music Park, Myrtle Beach, South Carolina.
- First roller coaster to traverse overtop a four-lane highway: Ravine Flyer II at Waldameer & Water World, Erie, Pennsylvania.

==== 2009 ====
- First roller coaster with a 100° drop: Saw – The Ride at Thorpe Park.

=== 2010s ===
==== 2010 ====
- First roller coaster with a vertical freefall drop: Th13teen at Alton Towers.
- Formula Rossa opens at Ferrari World on Yas Island, Abu Dhabi as the fastest roller coaster in the world.
- Intimidator 305 opens at Kings Dominion as the third giga coaster.
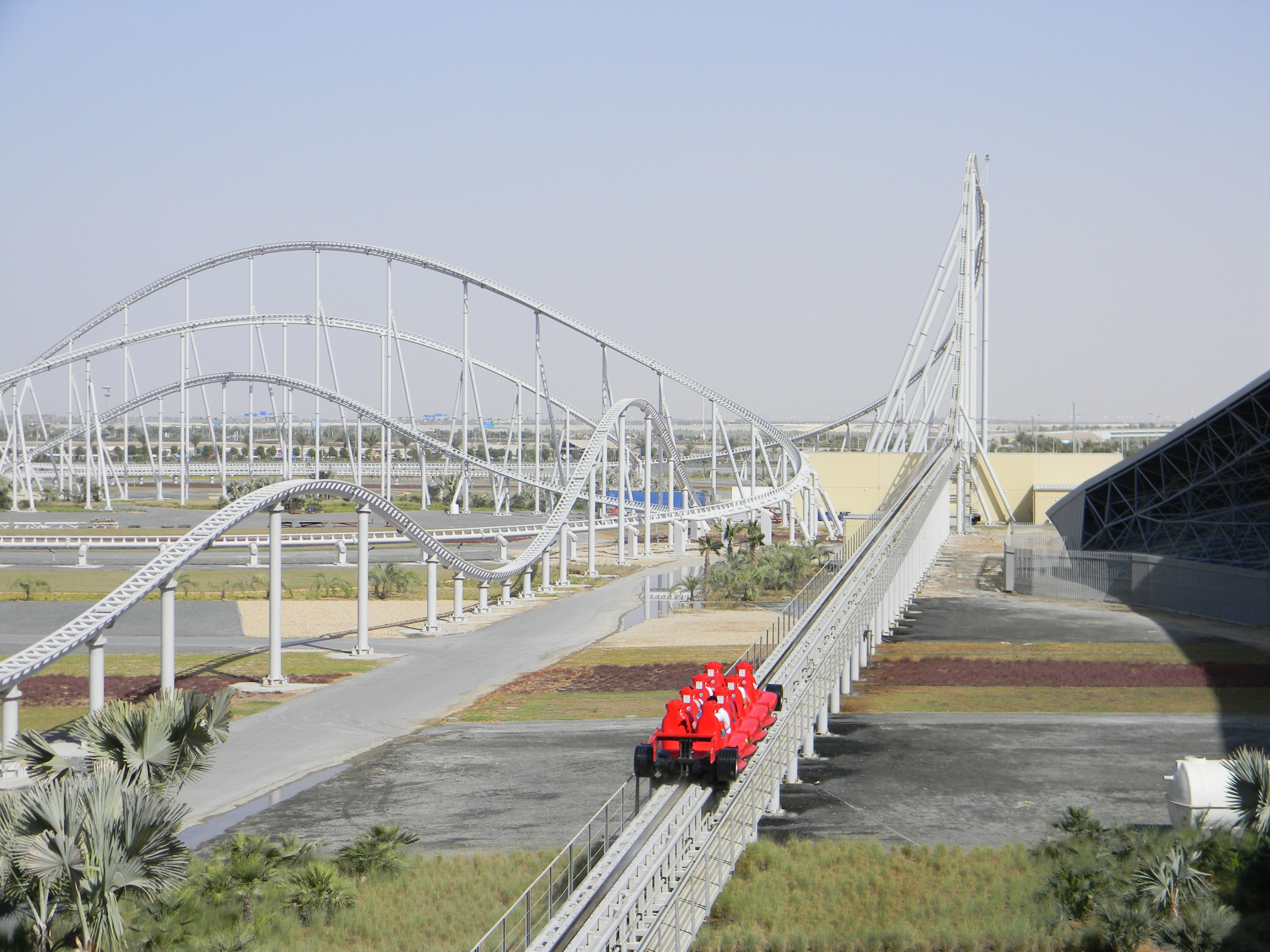
  Formula Rossa at Ferrari World is the fastest roller coaster in the world

==== 2011 ====
- First wooden coaster to steel hybrid conversion, first coaster designed by Rocky Mountain Construction: New Texas Giant at Six Flags Over Texas.

==== 2012 ====
- Leviathan opens at Canada's Wonderland, Vaughan, Ontario, as the fourth giga coaster.

==== 2013 ====
- First wooden roller coaster with three inversions: Outlaw Run at Silver Dollar City, Branson, Missouri.
- First roller coaster with 14 inversions, most inversions in the world: The Smiler at Alton Towers.
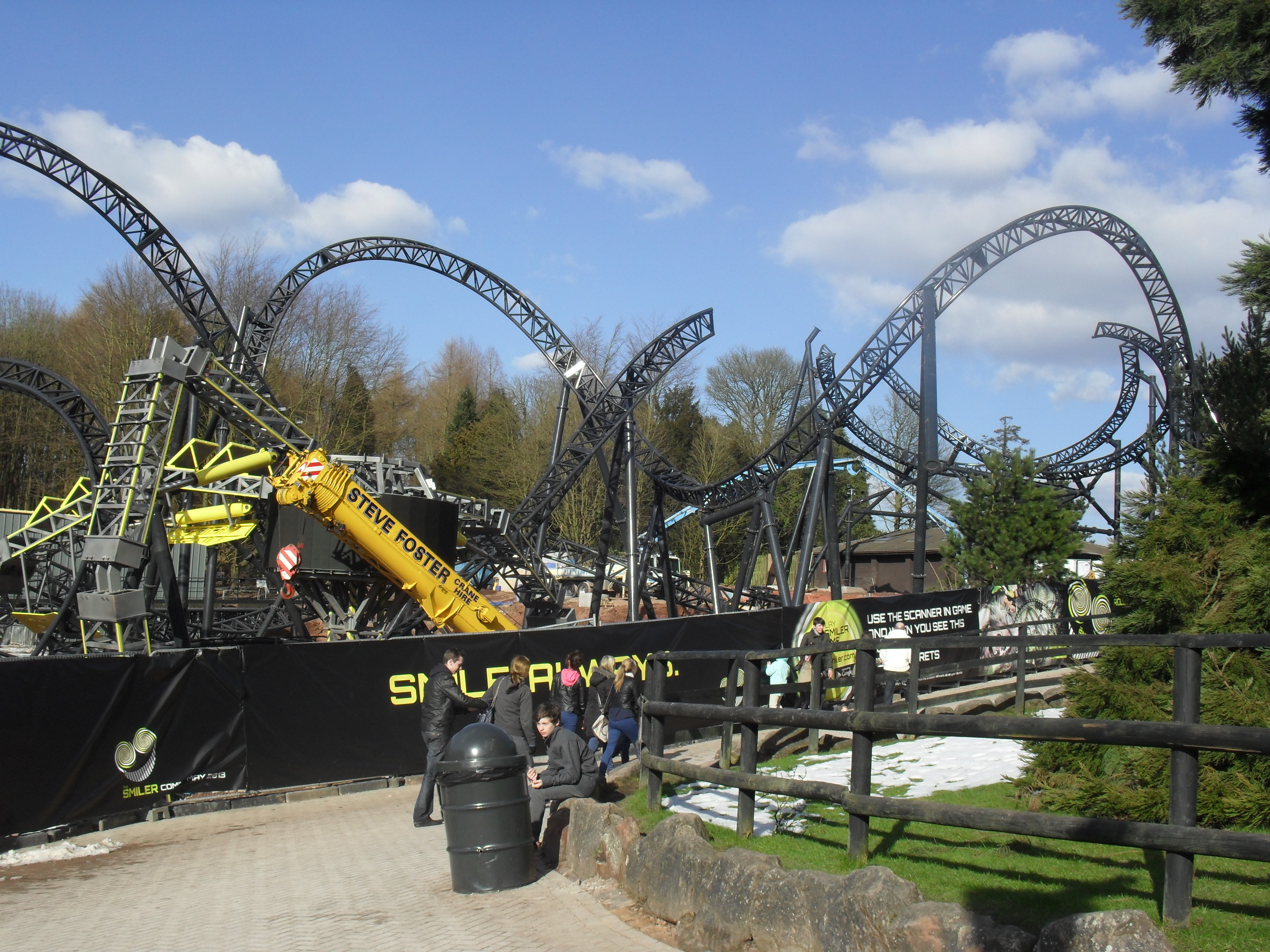
  The Smiler under construction in 2013 at Alton Towers

==== 2014 ====
- Goliath opens at Six Flags Great America as the fastest wooden roller coaster with the longest drop in the world, and the first wooden coaster with two inversions.

==== 2015 ====
- Fury 325 opens at Carowinds as the fifth giga coaster.
- First wooden shuttle coaster, steepest wooden roller coaster in the world: Switchback at ZDT's Amusement Park, Seguin, Texas.

==== 2016 ====
- First launched wooden coaster: Lightning Rod at Dollywood (the launch was removed in favor of a chain lift in 2024).

==== 2017 ====
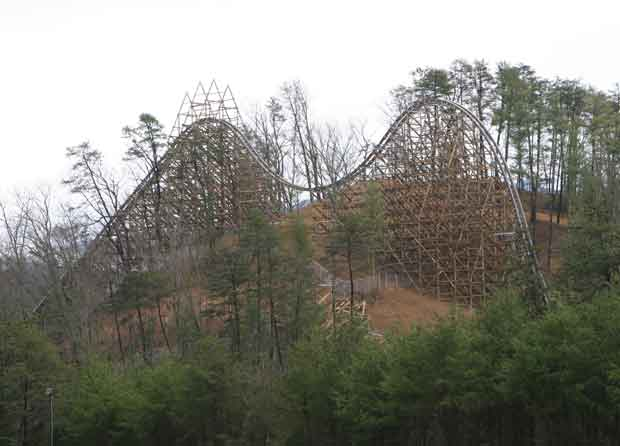
Lightning Rod at Dollywood, the first launched wooden roller coaster

- DC Rivals HyperCoaster opens at Warner Bros. Movie World in Gold Coast, Queensland as the tallest, fastest, and longest roller coaster in Australia.
- Red Force opens at PortAventura World, Tarragona, Catalonia, as the sixth giga coaster.

==== 2018 ====
- First single rail coaster: Wonder Woman Golden Lasso Coaster at Six Flags Fiesta Texas, San Antonio, Texas.
- First hybrid roller coaster to exceed 200 feet (61 m) in height: Steel Vengeance (formerly Mean Streak) at Cedar Point.
- First extreme spinning coaster: Time Traveler at Silver Dollar City.

==== 2019 ====
- TMNT Shellraiser opens at Nickelodeon Universe Theme Park, East Rutherford, New Jersey with the steepest drop on any roller coaster at 121.5°.

=== 2020s ===
==== 2020 ====
- Orion opens at Kings Island as the seventh giga coaster.
- First launched flying coaster: F.L.Y. at Phantasialand.

==== 2022 ====
- Guardians of the Galaxy: Cosmic Rewind opens at Epcot, Walt Disney World, Orlando, Florida as the most expensive coaster in history at $500 million.

==== 2025 ====
- First Ultra Surf roller coaster: Georgia Gold Rusher at Six Flags Over Georgia, Austell, Georgia.
- Falcons Flight opened at Six Flags Qiddiya City, Riyadh as the first roller coaster to exceed 600 feet (180 m) (also known as an exa coaster) and the tallest, fastest, and longest coaster in the world.

==== 2026 ====
- Tormenta Rampaging Run opens at Six Flags Over Texas with the tallest inversion on any roller coaster at 218 feet (66 m).

==== 2027 ====
- Bakunawa is set to open at Six Flags Great Adventure as the eighth giga coaster and the tallest and fastest spinning coaster, with the first upside down launch in the world.

== See also ==
- Roller coaster elements
- List of roller coaster rankings
- Physics of roller coasters
