= Loop the Loop (Olentangy Park) =

Early steel roller coaster in Columbus, Ohio

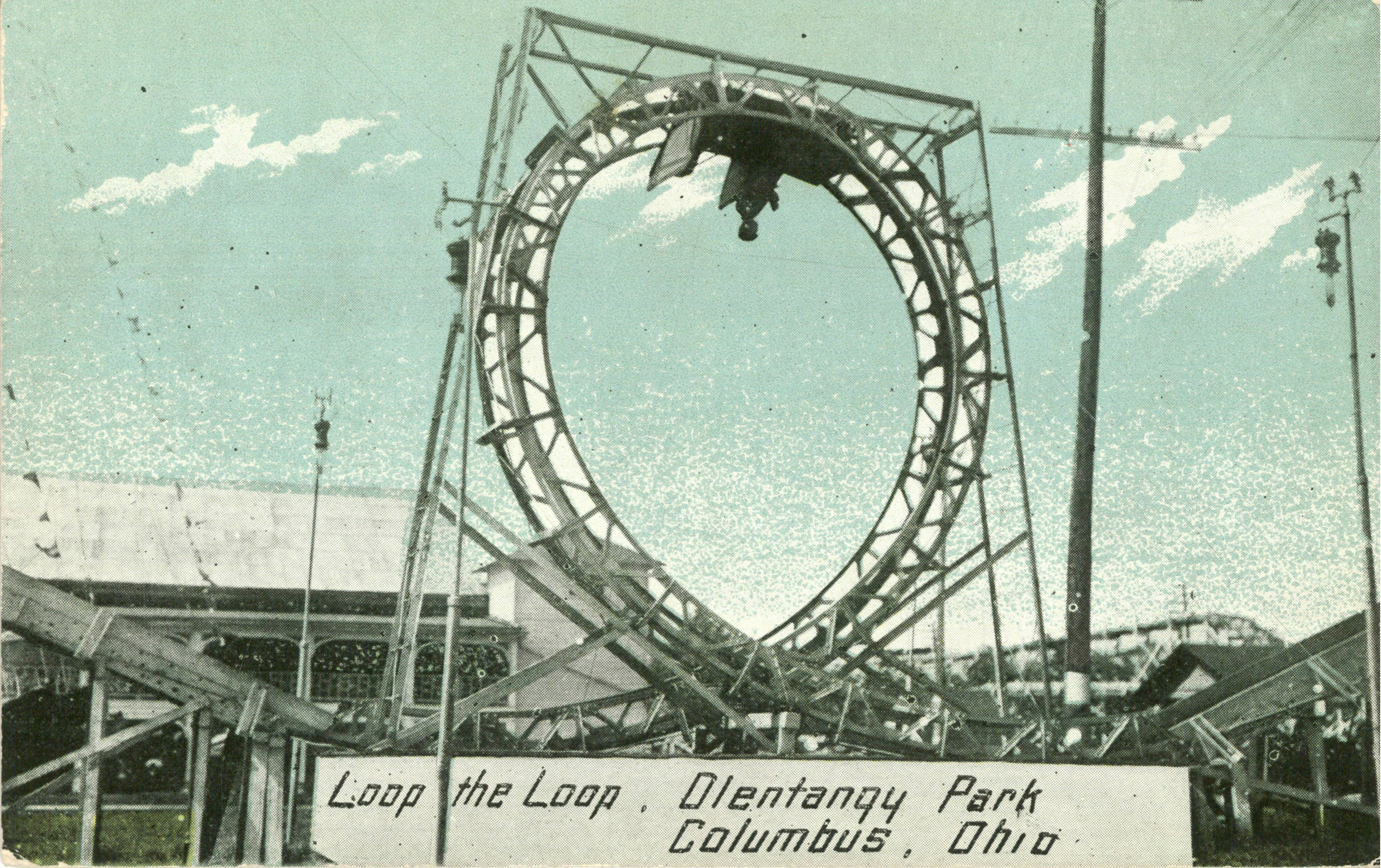

Olentangy Park
- Location: Olentangy Park
- Coordinates: 40°01′13.33″N 83°00′51.44″W
- Status: Removed
- Opening date: 1908

General statistics
- Type: Steel
- Manufacturer: Lina Beecher
- Designer: Lina Beecher
- Inversions: 1
- Loop the Loop at RCDB

Loop the Loop was an early looping steel roller coaster which operated at Olentangy Park in Columbus, Ohio during the first decade of the 1900s. It was one of the first looping roller coasters to operate in North America, and it was designed and built by noted inventor Lina Beecher.

== History ==
Loop the Loop was designed in 1904 by engineer and inventor Lina Beecher who was a supervisor at the American Railway Company. Beecher had previously designed the wooden Flip Flap Railway at Paul Boyton's Sea Lion Park on Coney Island, New York, but that coaster's circular loop produced excessive g-forces on its riders. Adapting the steel construction and teardrop-shaped loop pioneered by Edwin Prescott (builder of Loop the Loop roller coasters on Coney Island and Atlantic City), Beecher constructed the Loop the Loop at Olentangy Park. The coaster sat near the park's dancing pavilion. The ride was a failure, however, and it was removed by the end of 1914.

== Ride experience ==
Loop the Loop was Beecher's attempt to modify his earlier ride and apply the teardrop-shaped loop element of Prescott's looping coasters. While the ride had a considerably more mild experience than Beecher's original Flip Flap Railway, it was not popular and it attracted few repeat riders. This unpopularity was attributed to a ride that was improved (over the Flip Flap Railway), but still very uncomfortable for the ride occupants. One rider wrote of the experience: "Myself and two others went around the loop the loop. Once was enough." The primary difference between Prescott's coasters and the Olentangy Park Loop the Loop was that the Olentangy Park Loop the Loop was a single track coaster, while Prescott's Loop the Loops were both dual-tracked roller coasters which had parallel tracks, each with one vertical loop. Only four riders could ride the Olentangy Loop the Loop at once.

== See also ==
- Flip Flap Railway, the first looping roller coaster built on Coney Island and the first in North America. It was also built by Lina Beecher.
- Loop the Loop (Young's Pier), a looping coaster built in Atlantic City, New Jersey which was sometimes called Flip Flap Railway as well.
- Loop the Loop (Coney Island), The second looping coaster built at Coney Island.
