= Loop the Loop (Young's Pier) =

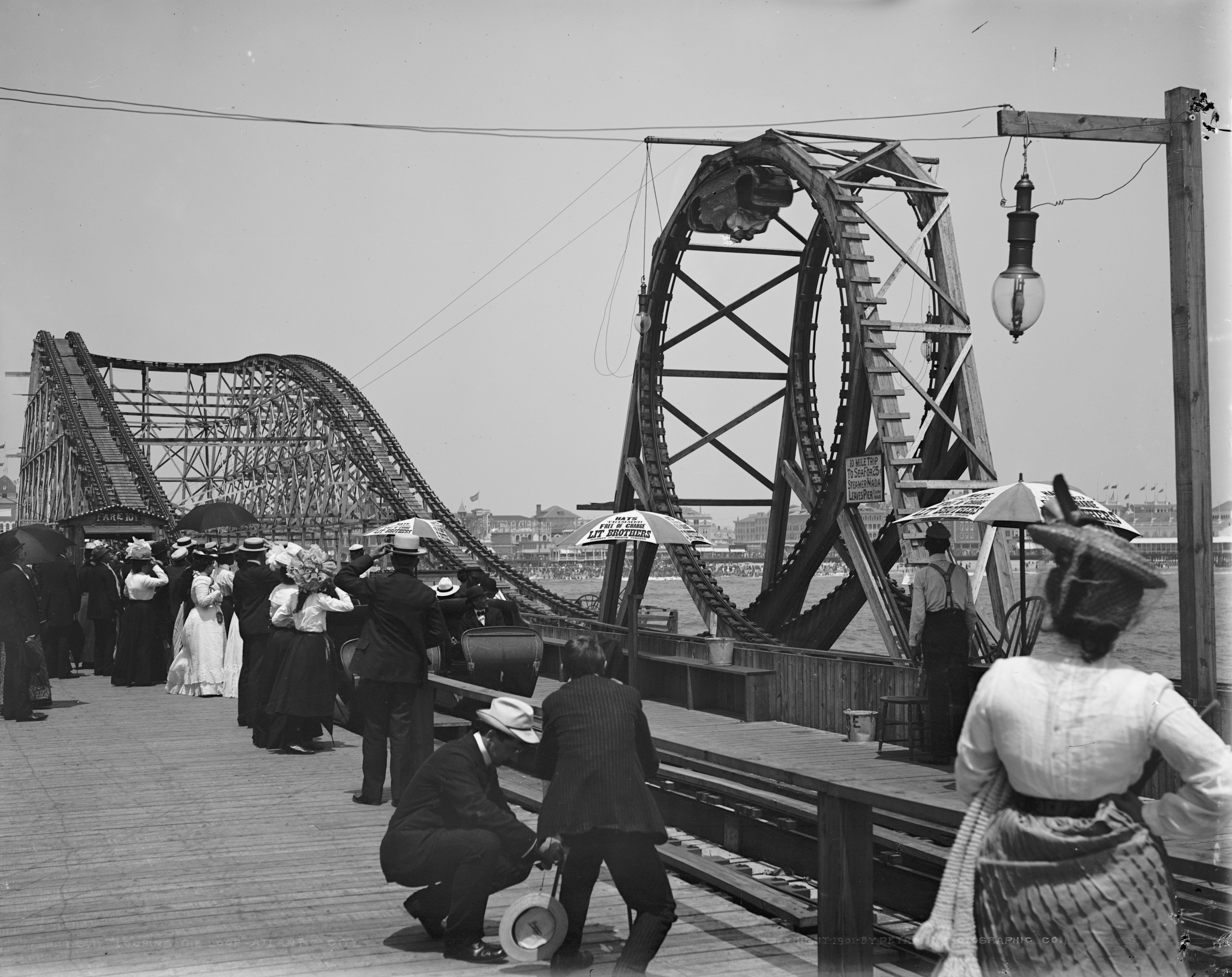

Atlantic City
- Coordinates: 39.3538°N 74.4342°W
- Status: Removed
- Opening date: 1901
- Closing date: 1912

General statistics
- Type: Steel
- Manufacturer: Edwin Prescott
- Designer: Edward A. Green
Inversions	1	1
- Loop the Loop at RCDB; Pictures of Loop the Loop at RCDB

Loop the Loop (occasionally referred to as the Flip Flap Railway) was a steel, dual-tracked roller coaster located in Atlantic City, New Jersey. The roller coaster opened in 1901 and operated until 1912. It was one of the earliest looping roller coasters in the United States.

== History ==
Loop the Loop was designed and built in 1901 by Edward A. Green and Edwin Prescott on one of Captain John L. Young's piers in Atlantic City, New Jersey. It was the goal of Green and Prescott to create a looping coaster which would not be subject to the same extreme g-forces which plagued Lina Beecher's earlier Flip Flap Railway on Coney Island in New York.

The Loop the Loop attracted considerable attention, and was promoted in a number of ways by John L. Young, the owner of the pier. For example, Young commissioned a photograph contest which offered a $40 prize for the best photograph of the new coaster (as well as numerous lesser prizes). Toy replicas were also made of the coaster.

== Ride experience ==
Like its sister coaster in Coney Island, Loop the Loop was a racing coaster with parallel tracks which each progressed through a single vertical loop. Another common factor was that both coasters incorporated an oval loop to reduce the g-forces produced by the earlier Coney Island Flip Flap Railway which utilized a circular loop. Despite the design improvements and substantial improvement in g-forces, however, the ride was reported to be unpleasant. This, paired with the ride's low capacity (only four individuals could ride the coaster every five minutes), meant that the Loop the Loop at Atlantic City was ultimately a failure.

== See also ==
- Flip Flap Railway, the first looping roller coaster built on Coney Island and the first in North America.
- Loop the Loop (Coney Island), the second looping coaster built on Coney Island which was also constructed by Edwin Prescott.
- Loop the Loop (Olentangy Park), A looping steel coaster built at Olentangy Park near Columbus, Ohio.
