= Loop the Loop (Coney Island) =

Steel roller coaster in Coney Island, Brooklyn, New York

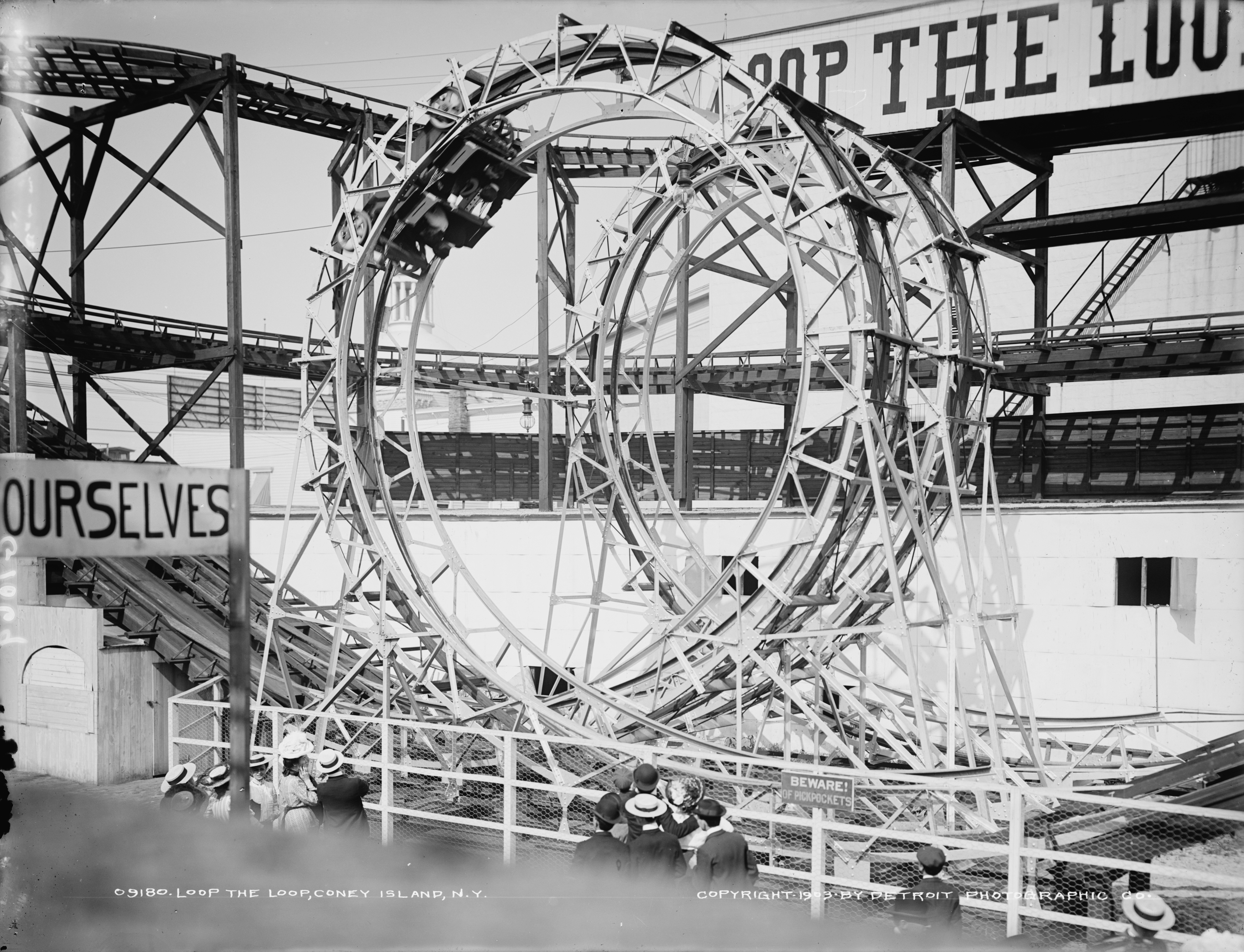

Coney Island
- Coordinates: 40.5745°N 73.978°W
- Status: Removed
- Opening date: 1901
- Closing date: 1910
- Replaced: Switchback Railway
- Replaced by: Giant Racer

General statistics
- Type: Steel
- Manufacturer: Edwin Prescott
- Designer: Edward A. Green
	Track 1	Track 2
Inversions	1	1
- Trains: a single car. Riders are arranged 2 across in 2 rows for a total of 4 riders per train.
- Loop the Loop at RCDB; Pictures of Loop the Loop at RCDB

Loop the Loop was a dual-tracked steel roller coaster that operated on Coney Island in Brooklyn, New York City, from 1901 to 1910. The coaster was one of the first looping roller coasters in North America.

== History ==
Loop the Loop was the second looping roller coaster ever to be built on Coney Island and was one of a handful of early looping roller coasters built in the United States in the late 19th and early 20th centuries. It was designed by Edward Green and manufactured by Edwin Prescott. The coaster was operated independently and was not part of one of the cohesive amusement parks which existed on Coney Island.

The coaster was built at the corner of West 10th and Surf Avenue on Coney Island, near the current location of the famous Coney Island Cyclone and at the location of the former Switchback Railway. The Loop the Loop lasted from 1901 to 1910 but was a relative commercial failure because of the low rider volume. This low rider volume was partly a function of the small cars on the coaster and partly because safety inspectors would not allow more than one car on the course at any given time, nor would they allow the cars to be joined into trains. The operators attempted to supplement the coaster's revenue by having an observation gallery where patrons could pay to watch others ride the roller coaster. Rides on the coaster itself cost 10 cents.

== Track layout ==
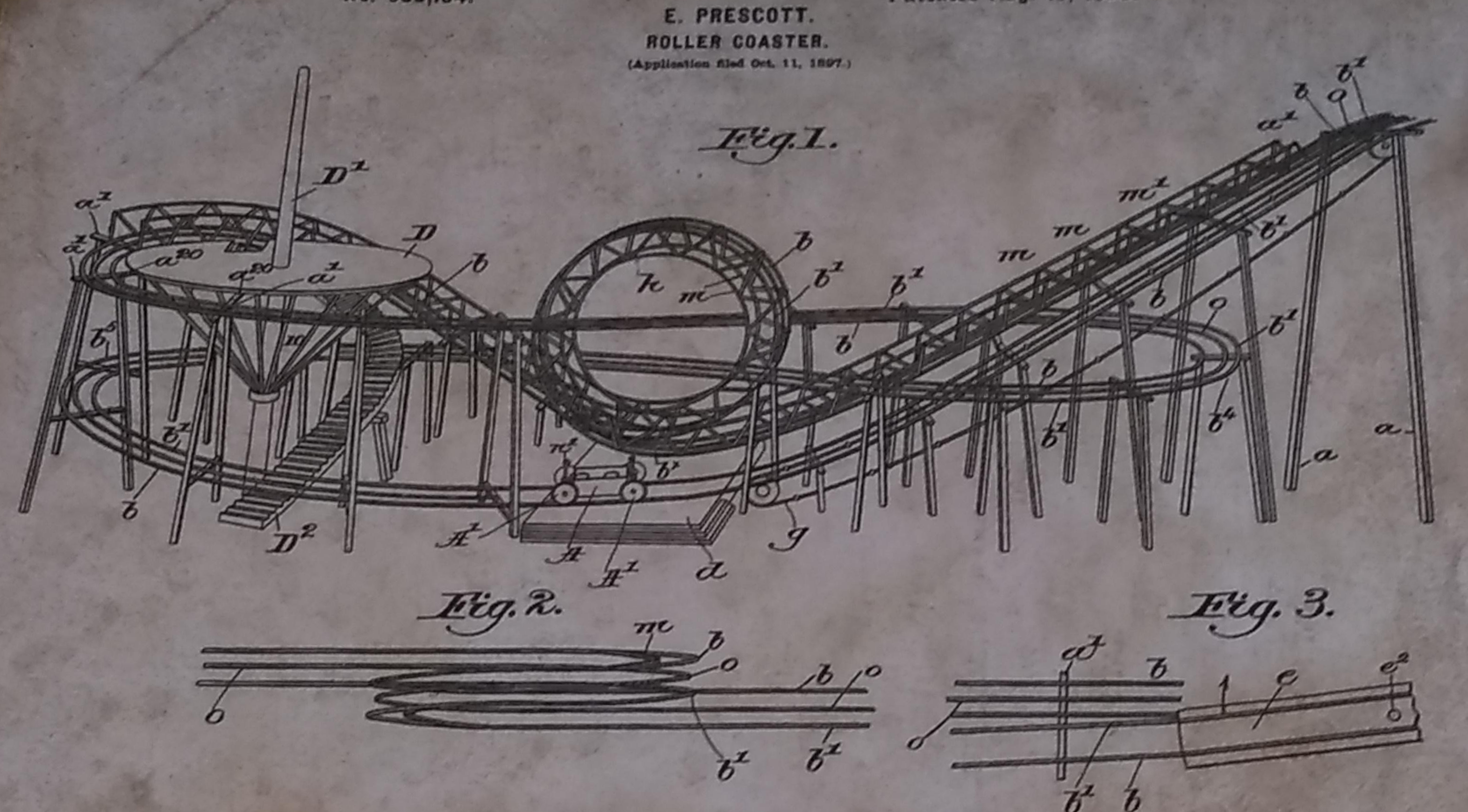
Prescott's patent drawings for Loop the Loop

Loop the Loop was an improvement in terms of ride comfort over previous looping coasters such as Lina Beecher's Flip Flap Railway and earlier centrifugal railways. This was primarily because Loop the Loop incorporated a more elliptical design, thereby reducing the g-forces which riders experienced on more circular roller coaster loops (which could be up to 12 g on the Flip Flap Railway). Loop the Loop also had rubber wheels to improve the ride comfort along with safety rails. Nevertheless, many riders still experienced discomfort.

Loop the Loop was laid out as a dual-track roller coaster. The two tracks ran parallel with one loop on each track. Despite the two tracks doubling possible rider volume, the small cars on the coaster restricted per-hour ridership numbers.

== See also ==
- Flip Flap Railway, the first looping roller coaster built on Coney Island and the first in North America.
- Loop the Loop (Young's Pier), a looping coaster built in Atlantic City, New Jersey which was sometimes called Flip Flap Railway as well.
- Loop the Loop (Olentangy Park), A looping steel coaster built at Olentangy Park near Columbus, Ohio.
