= Physics of roller coasters =

Explanation of forces acting on roller coasters

The physics of roller coasters comprises the mechanics that affect the design and operation of roller coasters, a machine that uses gravity and inertia to send a train of cars along a winding track. Gravity, inertia, g-forces, and centripetal acceleration give riders constantly changing forces which create certain sensations as the coaster travels around the track.

== Introduction ==
A roller coaster is a machine that uses gravity and inertia to send a train of cars along a winding track. The combination of gravity and inertia, along with g-forces and centripetal acceleration give the body certain sensations as the coaster moves up, down, and around the track. The forces experienced by the rider are constantly changing, leading to feelings of joy and exhilaration in some riders and nausea in others.

== Energy ==
Initially, the car is pulled to the top of the first hill and released, at which point it rolls freely along the track without any external mechanical assistance for the remainder of the ride. The purpose of the ascent of the first hill is to build up potential energy that will then be converted to kinetic energy as the ride progresses. The initial hill, or the lift hill, is the highest in the entire ride. When the train is pulled to the top, it gains potential energy, as explained by the equation for potential energy below:

$U_g = mgh$

where U_{g} is potential energy, m is mass, g is acceleration due to gravity and h is height above the ground. Two trains of identical mass at different heights will therefore have different potential energies: the train at a greater height will have more potential energy than a train at a lower height. This means that the potential energy for the roller coaster system is greatest at the highest point on the track, or the top of the lift hill. As the roller coaster train begins its descent from the lift hill, the stored potential energy converts to kinetic energy, or energy of motion. The faster the train moves, the more kinetic energy the train gains, as shown by the equation for kinetic energy:

$K = \frac{1}{2}mv^2$

where K is kinetic energy, m is mass, and v is velocity. Because the mass of a roller coaster car remains constant, if the speed is increased, the kinetic energy must also increase. This means that the kinetic energy for the roller coaster system is greatest at the bottom of the largest downhill slope on the track, typically at the bottom of the lift hill. When the train begins to climb the next hill on the track, the train's kinetic energy is converted back into potential energy, decreasing the train's velocity. This process of converting kinetic energy to potential energy and back to kinetic energy continues with each hill. The energy is never destroyed but is lost to friction between the car and track, bringing the ride to a complete stop.

== Inertia and gravity ==
When going around a roller coaster's vertical loop, inertia—‌which here produces an exhilarating acceleration force—‌also keeps passengers in their seats. As the car approaches a loop, the direction of a passenger's inertial velocity points straight ahead at the same angle as the track leading up to the loop. As the car enters the loop, the track guides the car up, moving the passenger up as well. This change in direction creates a feeling of extra gravity as the passenger is pushed down into the seat.

At the top of the loop, the force of the car's acceleration pushes the passenger off the seat toward the center of the loop, while inertia pushes the passenger back into the seat. Gravity and acceleration forces push the passenger in opposite directions with nearly equal force, creating a sensation of weightlessness.

At the bottom of the loop, gravity and the change in direction of the passenger's inertia from a downward vertical direction to one that is horizontal push the passenger into the seat, causing the passenger to once again feel very heavy. Most roller coasters utilize restraint systems, but the forces exerted by most inverting coasters would keep passengers from falling out.

== G-forces ==
Gravity force and g-forces at play during one complete looping motion of a roller coaster car

G-forces (gravitational forces) create the so-called "butterfly" sensation felt as a car goes down a gradient. An acceleration of 1 standard gravity (9.8 m/s^{2}) is the usual force of Earth's gravitational pull exerted on a person while standing still. The measurement of a person's normal weight incorporates this gravitational acceleration. When a person feels weightless at the top of a loop or while going down a hill, they are in free fall. However, if the top of a hill is curved more narrowly than a parabola, riders will experience negative Gs and be lifted out of their seats, experiencing the so-called "butterfly" or "air-time" sensation.

== Difference between wood and steel coasters ==
A wooden coaster has a track consisting of thin laminates of wood stacked together, with a flat steel rail fixed to the top laminate. Steel coasters use tubular steel, I beam, or box section running rails. The supporting structure of both types may be steel or wood. Traditionally, steel coasters employed inversions to thrill riders, whereas wooden coasters relied on steep drops and sharp changes in direction to deliver their thrills. However, recent advances in coaster technology have seen the rise of hybrid steel coasters with wooden structures, an example being New Texas Giants at Six Flags Over Texas, and wooden coasters that feature inversions, such as Outlaw Run at Silver Dollar City.

== History ==
The basic principles of roller coaster mechanics have been known since 1865, since then roller coasters have become a popular diversion.

As better technology became available, engineers began to use computerized design tools to calculate the forces and stresses that the ride would subject passengers to. Computers are now used to design safe coasters with specially designed restraints and lightweight and durable materials. Today, tubular steel tracks and polyurethane wheels allow coasters to travel over 100 miles per hour (160 km/h), while even taller, faster, and more complex roller coasters continue to be built.

== See also ==
- Euthanasia Coaster
- Jerk and Snap, crackle and Pop
