= Flip Flap Railway =

Looping roller coaster in New York, 1888–1902

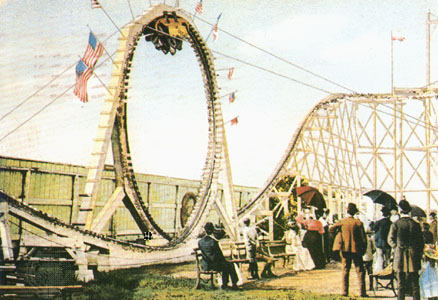

Sea Lion Park
- Location: Sea Lion Park
- Coordinates: 40.578°N 73.979°W
- Status: Removed
- Opening date: 1895
- Closing date: 1902

General statistics
- Type: Wood
- Manufacturer: Lina Beecher
- Designer: Lina Beecher
- Inversions: 1
- G-force: 6–8
- Trains: Unknown number of trains with a single car; riders arranged 1 across in 2 rows for a total of 2 riders per train
- Flip Flap Railway at RCDB

Flip Flap Railway was the name of a looping wooden roller coaster which operated for a number of years at Paul Boyton's Sea Lion Park on Coney Island in Brooklyn, New York. The coaster, which opened in 1895, was one of the first looping roller coasters to operate in North America. It was also notable for its engineering as well as the extreme G-forces which this engineering inflicted on riders. It closed in 1902 after low rider interest and frequent injuries.

== History and design ==
The first looping roller coasters were built in Europe in the mid-1800s. These rides, known as "centrifugal railways", were initially designed to be temporary installations and they achieved little success.

Early film clip of Flip Flap Railway's operation

The Flip Flap Railway was tested in Toledo, Ohio in 1888 by designer Lina Beecher before the coaster was moved to Coney Island. The coaster was tested with sand bags and monkeys before human riders were allowed on the coaster. The coaster had a single rail and riders rode two-to-a-car and sat in tandem. Sea Lion Park developer Boyton liked Beecher's coaster and decided to move it to Sea Lion Park.

Flip Flap Railway was shut down along with Sea Lion Park in 1902. While Sea Lion Park was replaced with Luna Park in 1903, Flip Flap Railway was not retained as it was not as popular. The two-person cars also meant that it was difficult to turn a profit on the coaster.

== Ride experience ==
Like the earlier centrifugal railways in Europe, Flip Flap Railway was notorious for the extreme g-forces that it produced in its riders. The circular nature of the coaster's loop, as well as its relatively small diameter of 7.6 metres (25 ft), meant that it could produce forces of approximately 12 g_{0} (120 m/s^{2}). This caused riders to often experience discomfort and neck injuries from whiplash. Modern looping roller coasters use teardrop-shaped loops to greatly reduce these g-forces.

=== G-Force claims ===
Contemporary reports and later retellings have claimed that the Flip Flap Railway subjected riders to forces as high as 12 G. However, modern analyses of the ride's design, speed, and dimensions suggest that these figures were likely exaggerated. Based on the ride's estimated maximum speed of approximately 35 to 40 miles per hour and the geometry of its 25-foot circular loop, calculations indicate that the actual forces experienced would have been in the range of 6 to 8 G. While still extremely high by modern roller coaster standards, and sufficient to cause injury or discomfort, this is notably lower than the traditionally cited figure of 12 G.

== See also ==
- Loop the Loop (Coney Island), the second looping roller coaster built on Coney Island.
- Loop the Loop (Young's Pier), a looping coaster built in Atlantic City, New Jersey which was sometimes called Flip Flap Railway as well.
- Loop the Loop (Olentangy Park), Lina Beecher's only other roller coaster. A looping steel coaster built at Olentangy Park near Columbus, Ohio.
