= Lina Beecher =

American inventor and roller coaster engineer (1841–1915)

- Born: January 2, 1841; Byron, New York
- Died: October 5, 1915 (aged 74); Lapeer, Michigan

Lina Beecher (January 2, 1841 – October 5, 1915) was an American inventor and roller coaster engineer. Beecher is best known for building the first looping roller coaster in North America, which was known as the Flip Flap Railway, and a later looping roller coaster known as Loop the Loop. He is also known for designing a number of other inventions and patents with a variety of applications.

== Personal life ==
Born in 1841 in Byron, New York, Beecher was the son of Julius Beecher and Orpha Taggart. As a young man, Beecher was an exceptional athlete and won running competitions. Later, he joined the Union Army, serving in the American Civil War as a member of the cavalry where Beecher reached the rank of captain.

In 1864, Beecher married Margaret Jeffers. They had two children, William and Lina Jr., before Margaret died in 1883. One year later, in 1884, Beecher married Harriet Johnson with whom he had one child, a daughter named Jane. After the war, Beecher held a variety of occupations and lived in a variety of places. For example, Beecher worked on the railroad in Tennessee and also worked in the Florida orange industry. In addition, he worked at the American Railway Company where he was the general superintendent and designed roller coasters.

== Inventions ==
Beecher was a prolific inventor. His inventions include a type of monorail, a portable telephone purposed for the army, and a flangeless system for railways. He was, however, best known for his roller coaster design—particularly his innovations in looping roller coasters.

=== Flip Flap Railway ===
The Flip Flap Railway was the first commercial looping roller coaster to be built in North America. Beecher built the coaster out of wood and first tested the design in 1888. The coaster was tested in Toledo, Ohio with sandbags, monkeys, and eventually human riders. Showman Paul Boyton was impressed and decided to purchase the coaster and move it to his Sea Lion Park in Coney Island, New York in 1895. The coaster used a circular loop, in contrast to modern looping coasters which use more elliptical designs. This circular design element produced forces up to 12 Gs in the ride's occupants, leading to rider discomfort and neck injuries.

=== Loop the Loop ===
Following the failure of his Flip Flap Railway, Beecher's next design was changed to follow Ed Prescott's inclusion of a more elliptical loop (used in his coasters at Coney Island and Atlantic City). The coaster also shared Prescott's steel structure design. The main difference between Beecher's design and Prescott's new design was that Beecher stayed with a single track, whereas Prescott incorporated two racing tracks that progressed through the vertical loop at the same time. Beecher's Loop the Loop was built at Olentangy Park near Columbus, Ohio. Despite its smoother ride, however, Beecher's new coaster was a relative failure and was removed from the park soon thereafter.

=== Other coasters ===
In addition to Flip Flap Railway's tests in Toledo, Ohio, Beecher is known to have tried exhibiting a looping coaster in 1901 at the Pan-American Exposition in Buffalo, New York. The coaster was considered so dangerous, however, that it was not allowed on the exposition grounds.
