= Centrifugal railway =

19th century looping roller coasters

Centrifugal Railway
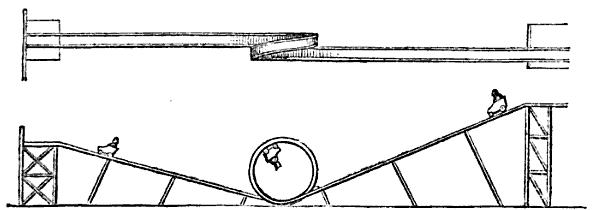
- Original design drawings of the Centrifugal Railway
- Status: Discontinued
- First manufactured: 1848
- Designer: Clavieres; Hutchinson, Higgins et al.
- Locations: Various locations in the United Kingdom and France

Centrifugal Railway was the name of a number of early looping roller coasters that were built in Western Europe in the middle of the 19th century. These rides were very similar in their basic design to many modern-day shuttle roller coasters (i.e., they did not make a complete circuit), but with only one lift hill and no launch. A single roller coaster car would ascend to the peak on the coaster before descending rapidly down the same hill and then passing through the central loop with enough speed to remain on the track at the top of the loop. The size of these centrifugal railways differed; some were purported to have vertical loops of a mere 2 metres (6.6 ft), while others were estimated to be 12 metres (39 ft) (although, as described below, early coaster designers were prone to cases of gross exaggeration).

== History ==
It was not long after the creation of the first wheeled roller coasters in the late 18th century or the early 19th century that the first roller coaster inversion was designed. This first design was created in 1833 by an engineer named Clavieres, but it was not implemented into a functioning ride until more than a decade later. In 1843, designers Hutchinson and Higgins registered a design and exhibited a "Centrifugal Iron Railway" at theaters in various British cities including London, Manchester, and Liverpool.

A more permanent outdoor version called the "Centrifugal Railway", the first permanent looping roller coaster, was installed Paris in 1848. The coaster had a 13-metre (43 ft) drop and a 4-metre (13 ft) loop.

Although installations were later placed in the cities of Bordeaux, Havre, and Lyons, the ride ultimately proved to be unpopular and more looping roller coasters were not built for nearly twenty years.

The centrifugal railways built in the 1840s were extensively tested before allowing human riders. The operators of the Railways tested the rides with a variety of things occupying the cars, including egg crates, glasses of water, flowers, sandbags, and even a monkey. Although the 1840s centrifugal railways had no reported safety issues, a later version built in 1865 at the Cirque Napoléon was quickly closed by police after the first car sent through the loop derailed.

== Ride experience ==
=== Inversions ===
	Inversion
1	Circular loop

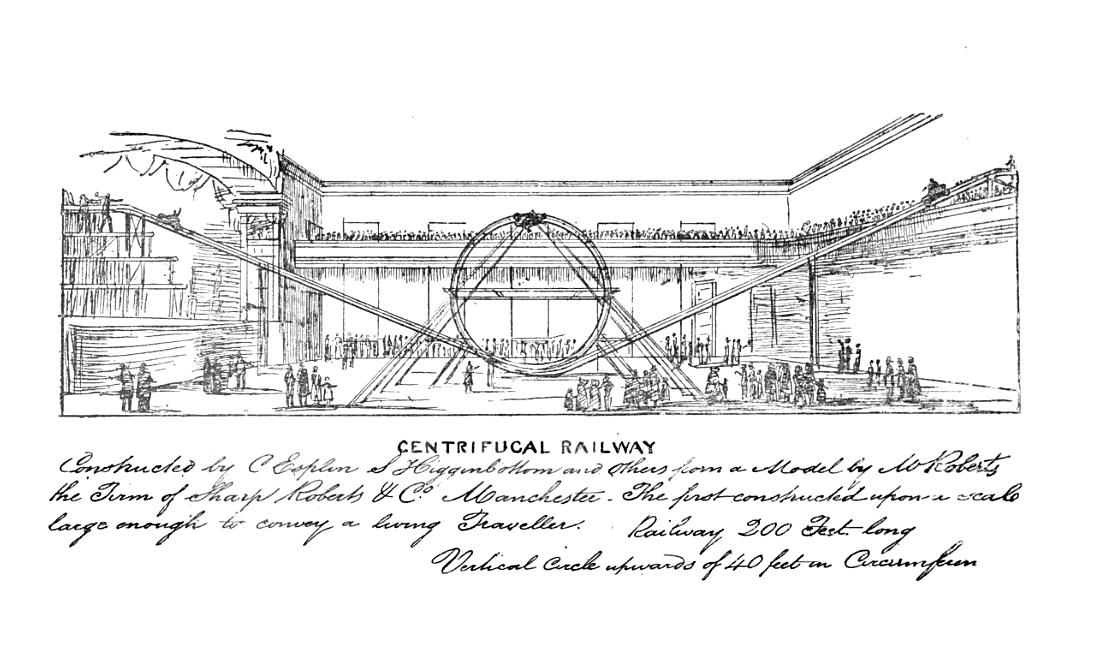
A detailed sketch of a centrifugal railway in Manchester

=== The ride ===
There are few first-hand accounts that remain preserved from riders of the various centrifugal railways. Ride operators and promoters engaged in incredible levels of exaggeration regarding the speed and dimensions of the ride. For example, one individual made the absurd claim that the centrifugal railway reached a "terrific speed...[of] more than one hundred and fifty miles per hour" (by comparison, this is the approximate speed Formula Rossa, the world's fastest roller coaster, currently reaches). Although reports by some were favorable, the ride's overall success was poor, and it became the subject of derision in various editorial cartoons of the day. The centrifugal railways shared a circular loop shape that produced intense g-forces on riders of Lina Beecher's 1895 Flip Flap Railway. This circular shape differed from the teardrop-shaped loops which are used in modern roller coaster inversions—producing lower g-forces and less rider discomfort.

New title	Most Inversions on a Roller Coaster; 1846–1865	Succeeded by Loopingbahn
