= Sea Lion Park =

Former American amusement park

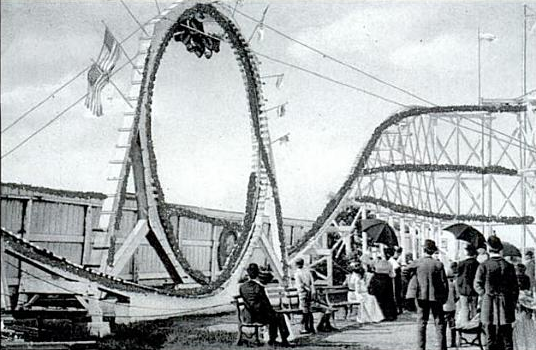
- Flip Flap Railway in Sea Lion Park
- Interactive map of Sea Lion Park
- Location: Coney Island, Brooklyn, United States
- Coordinates: 40.5775°N 73.9790°W
- Status: Defunct
- Opened: 1895
- Closed: 1903
- Owner: Paul Boyton

Sea Lion Park was a 16-acre (65,000 m^{2}) amusement park started in 1895 on Coney Island by Paul Boyton. He fenced the property and charged admission, the park becoming the first enclosed and permanent amusement park in North America. Up until the establishment of this park, amusement areas around the country consisted of pay-as-you-go concessions. In 1903, Sea Lion Park was replaced by Luna Park.

== History ==
Paul Boyton achieved international notice with various demonstrations of a rubber suit, which was a life saving device, similar to a type of kayak, for example, by crossing the English Channel. He travelled around the United States with an aquatic circus and in 1894 established an amusement park in Chicago. He then decided to settle in Coney Island and purchased the land behind the Elephant Hotel as a permanent location for his aquatic show featuring 40 sea lions.

== Rides and attractions ==
The most popular attraction, aside from the aquatic show, was a ride called the Water Chute. The attraction, designed by Boyton and Thomas Polk, consisted of flat bottomed boat that slid down a ramp into a pool of water at the bottom. When the boat hit the pool it would skim across the surface of the pool. Boyton, a consummate showman, also publicized the ride by staging contests in which animals ranging from lions to bears and even baby elephants would ride the chutes.

The park also included the infamous Flip Flap Railway, which was a roller coaster ride, designed by Lina Beecher, that inverted the riders in a loop after fall from a height of 20m. The ride was too dangerous and was closed. Boyton also added an old mill style ride called Cages of Wild Wolves, and a ballroom (1899).

== Demise ==
By 1902, Boyton could not keep up the pace of new attraction introductions that the public craved. Boyton tried to keep the public interested by investing $100,000 in a revamp of Sea Lion Park during the winter of 1901, and he also purchased Topsy, a well-known elephant, early in the spring of 1902 from Forepaugh's Circus. However, the 1902 season was rainy and not profitable. The nearby Steeplechase Park had opened on Coney Island in 1897 and was presenting even newer competition. By the end of 1902, Frederic Thompson and Elmer "Skip" Dundy obtained a long term lease for Sea Lion Park and it was re-opened as Luna Park.

== See also ==
- List of abandoned amusement parks
