= Olentangy Park =

Amusement park in Ohio

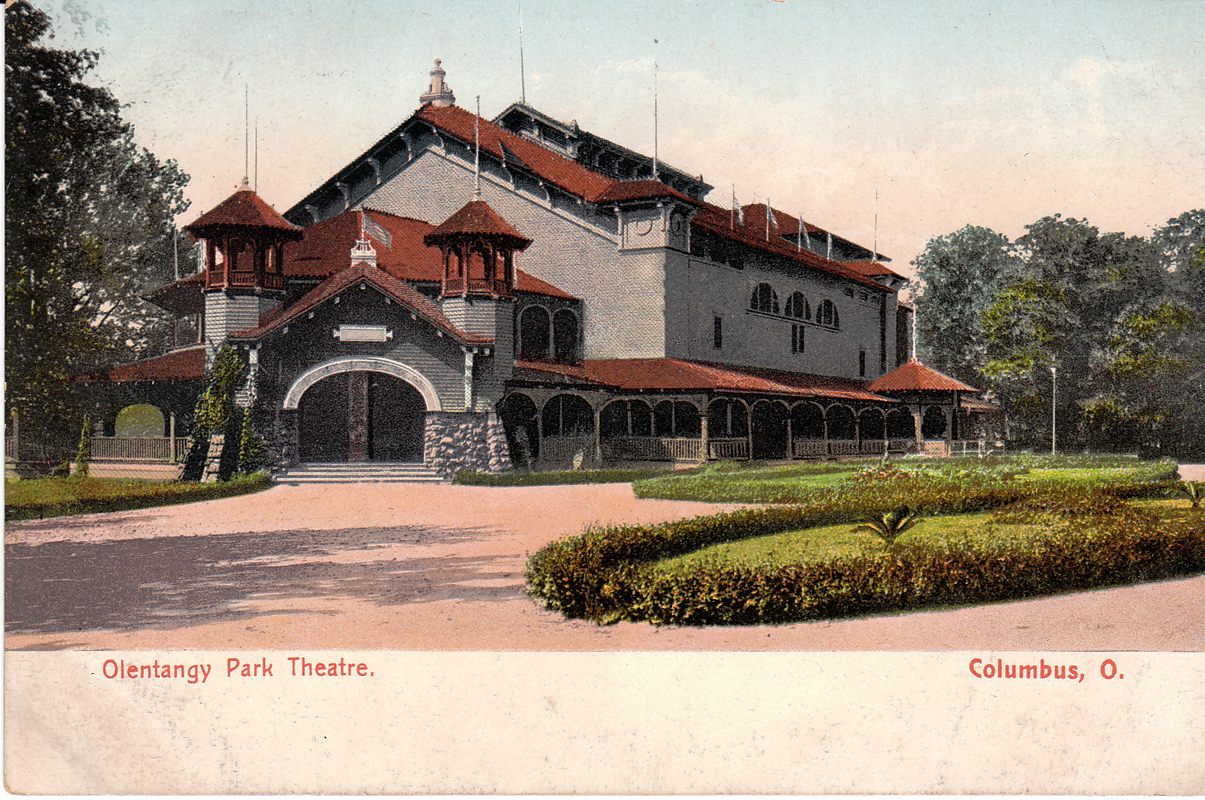
- Olentangy Park Theatre
- Interactive map of Olentangy Park
- Coordinates: 40.020747°N 83.014705°W
- Status: Defunct
- Opened: 1880
- Closed: 1937

Olentangy Park was a trolley park, a type of amusement park, in Clintonville, Columbus, Ohio, operating from 1880 to 1937.

== Location ==
Olentangy Park was located in what is now the southwest corner of Clintonville. The park boundaries on its west and east sides were the Olentangy River and north High Street, North Street on the south, and nearly to West Tulane Road on the north.

== History ==
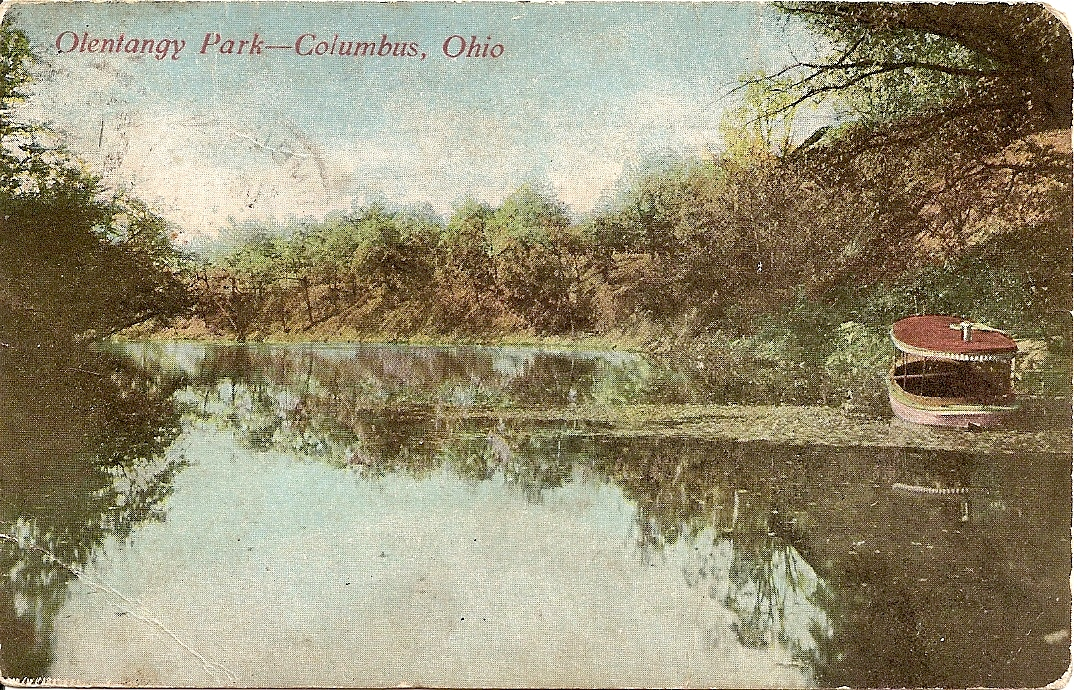
Olentangy Park postcard

=== Robert M. Turner (1880–1895) ===
Prior to 1880, Olentangy Park was a wooded area on the Olentangy River which was popular for picnics and swimming. There was a mill in the area north of Ackerman Road. In 1880, Robert M. Turner purchased the area. The first development of this property was the building of a formal picnic ground and swimming area in 1881. Then a tavern was built on the site and Turner renamed it "The Villa." Between 1881 and 1895, little changed. A few small amusement rides, a carousel, and possibly some pony rides were added.

=== Columbus Railway, Power and Light Company ===
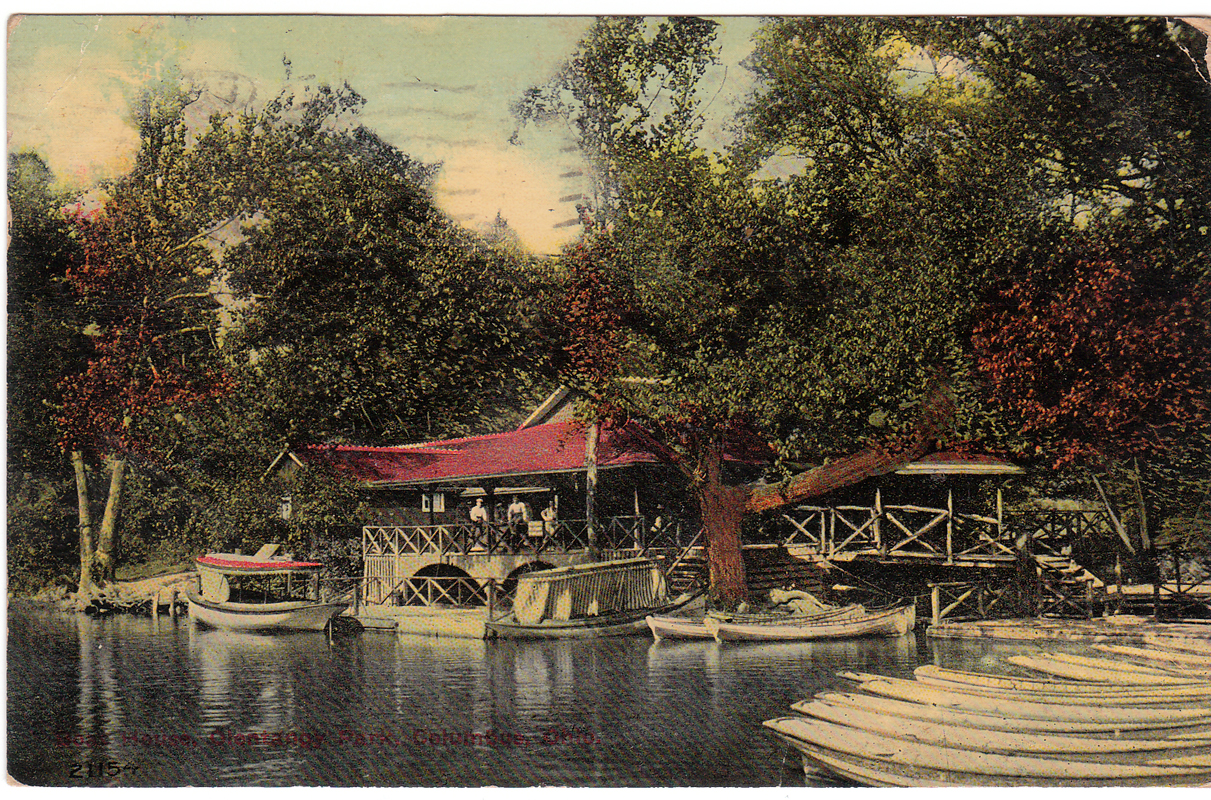
The Boathouse at Olentangy Park, 1903

In 1895, the Columbus Railway, Power and Light Company purchased "The Villa" at the northern end of the company's North High Street trolley line. The company hoped to use the park to increase the ridership on the weekend. Electric lighting was added to the park in 1896. That same year, the company held a naming contest resulting in the park being named "Olentangy Park" by an anonymous "Volunteer."

=== The Dusenbury brothers (1899–1923) ===
In 1899, around 50 acres were purchased by the Dusenbury brothers of New Lexington, Ohio. They immediately added a large casino with a theater just north of the ravine, more bowling alleys, and a fun house attraction called the "Crystal Maze." Later, they built a "Water Toboggan" and a roller coaster called "The Figure Eight." The 1904 World's Fair was held in St. Louis. At its conclusion, the Dusenbury brothers purchased the "Japanese Gardens" exhibit and installed it at Olentangy Park as "Fair Japan." In 1907, they opened the second Dancing Pavilion, expanding it in 1914 and 1920, making it the largest in the state.

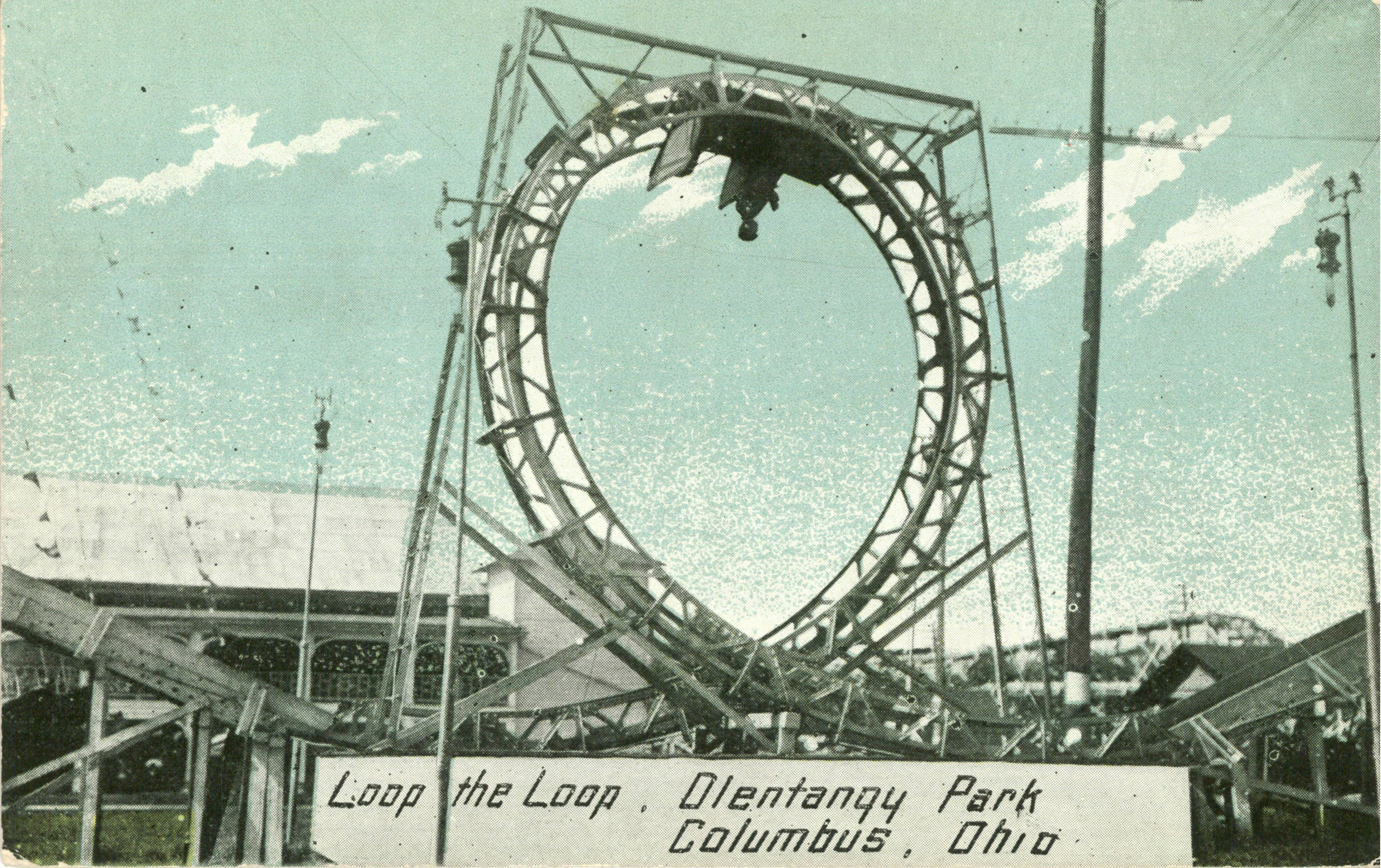
Loop the Loop roller coaster, 1908

=== Leo and Elmer Heanlein (1923–1937) ===
In August 1923, the brothers Leo and Elmer Heanlein purchased the park. They expanded the zoo and added the Mysterious Sensation, a fun house attraction, to the Midway, and experimented with short-term attractions like the "Lindy-Loop" and "Flight Tutors." They ultimately closed the park during the Great Depression.

=== After Closing ===
Olentangy Park closed at the end of its 1937 season. In 1938, the L.L. LeVeque Company purchased the Olentangy Park property to build Olentangy Village. The Haenlein Brothers sold some of the park's rides and equipment while moving the Grand Carousel, the remaining Ferris wheel, the Airplane ride (the Circle Swing), the Dodgem, the Rifle Range, and others to their Zoo Park in Powell, Ohio. The skating rink became the offices of Zoo Park. Zoo Park was sold to the Gooding Amusement Company in 1956 after Leo Haenlein's death. After a few attempts to purchase Zoo Park, the Columbus Zoo and Aquarium abandoned negotiations in 1976. The city purchased Zoo Park in 1981 and turned it over to the Columbus Zoological Association, to be operated along with the zoo. The grounds were turned into Wyandot Lake Amusement Park in 1984 and later Zoombezi Bay.

== Olentangy Park remnants ==
In 1940, a bowling alley, the Olentangy Lanes, was constructed on the site of the Park's parking lot. It was destroyed by fire on Oct. 27, 1980.

=== The 1914 Mangels-Illions carousel ===
Olentangy Park's 1914 Mangels-Illions carousel was moved in the 1930s to Scioto Ranch Park/Zoo Park, the location that later became part of Wyandot Lake Amusement Park near the Columbus Zoo. It continued to operate, though in deteriorating condition. In 1999 it was removed from Wyandot Lake and Carousel Works Inc. was commissioned to undertake a costly restoration. The carousel resumed operation in spring 2000, housed in a climate controlled building at the Columbus Zoo and Aquarium. There, in the first month of operation, 42,000 customers paid $1 each to ride it. On July 28, 2004, the carousel celebrated its one millionth rider since being restored and moved to the zoo.

=== Swimming pool ===
The Olentangy Park swimming pool added in 1917. It was halved in 1996 and completely filled in during 2002, to allow expansion of residential areas.

== See also ==
- Indianola Park
- Minerva Park
