= List of Arrow Dynamics rides =

The following is a list of amusement rides manufactured by the now-defunct Arrow Development and Arrow Dynamics. The company changed names and ownership four times between 1945 and 2002, operating as Arrow Development from 1945 to 1981, Arrow-Huss from 1981 to 1984, and as Arrow Dynamics from 1986 to 2001. The remaining assets were purchased by S&S on October 28, 2002. In November 2012, Sansei Yusoki Co. Ltd, acquired controlling interest in S&S and renamed itself S&S Sansei Technologies.

== List of roller coasters ==
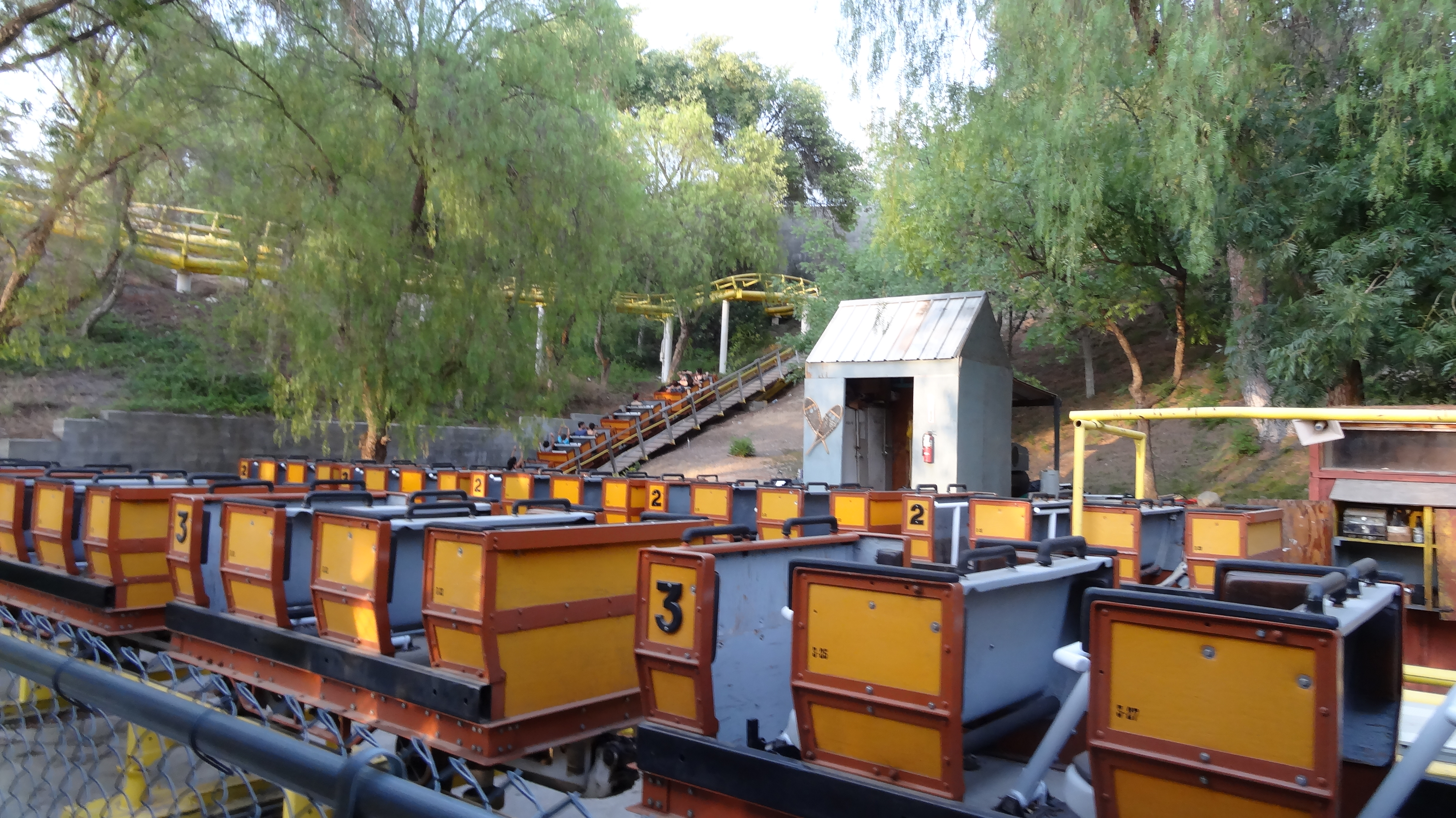
Gold Rusher is Six Flags Magic Mountain's first roller coaster.

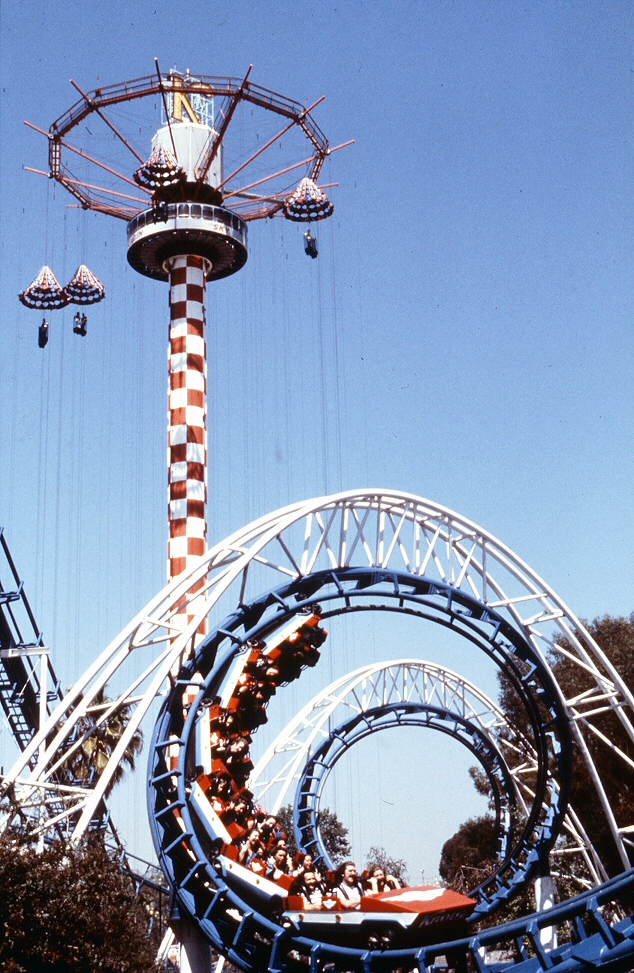
Corkscrew, at Knott's Berry Farm, circa 1980, before being relocated to Silverwood.

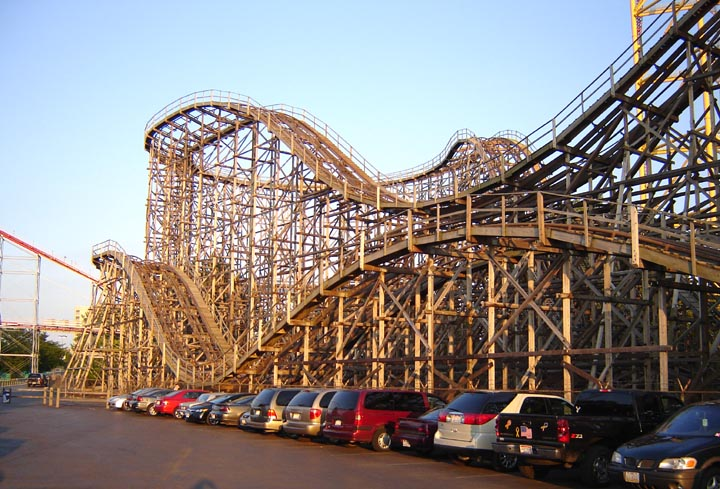
View of Gemini at Cedar Point.

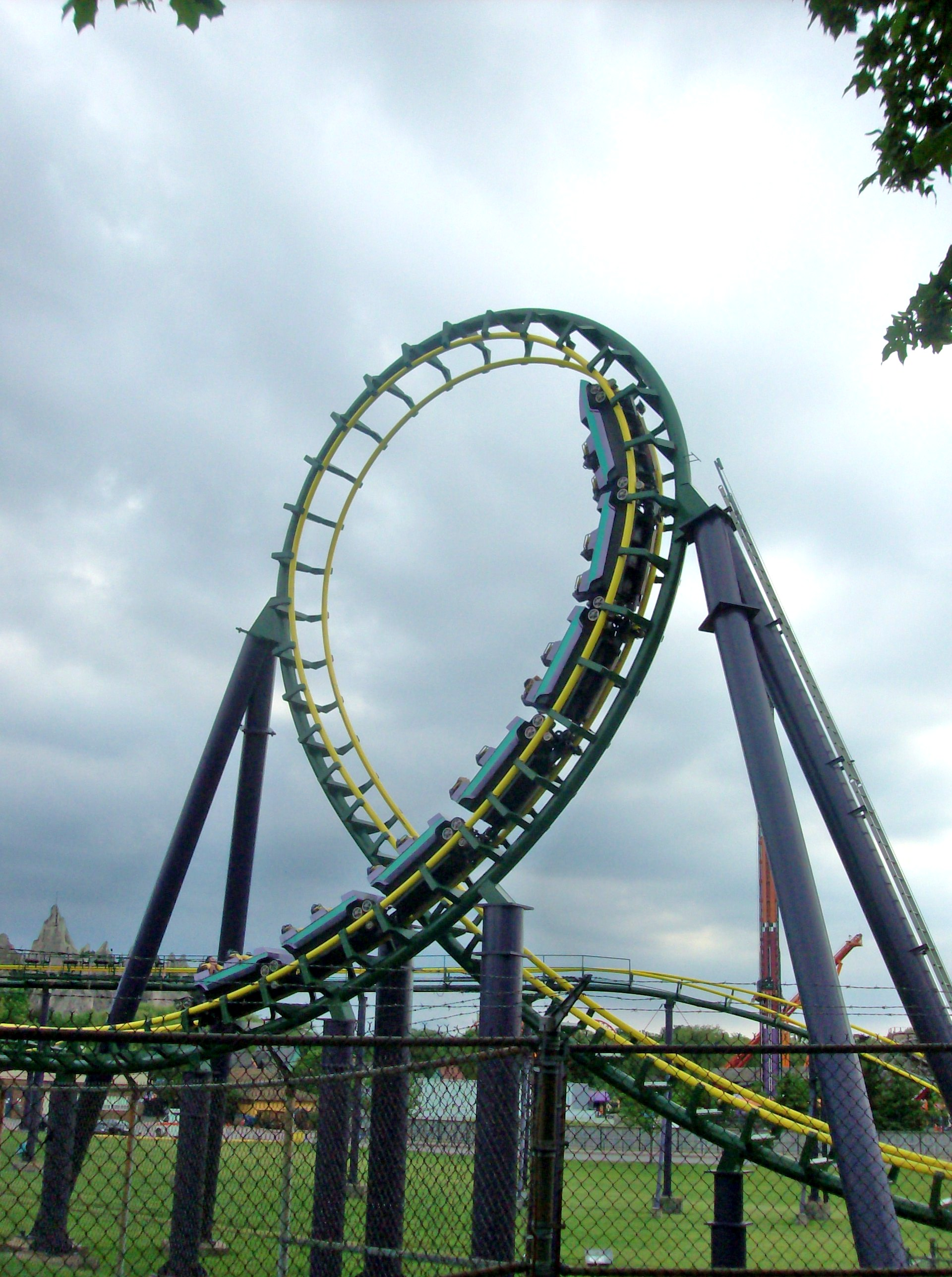
View of Dragon Fyre at Canada's Wonderland.

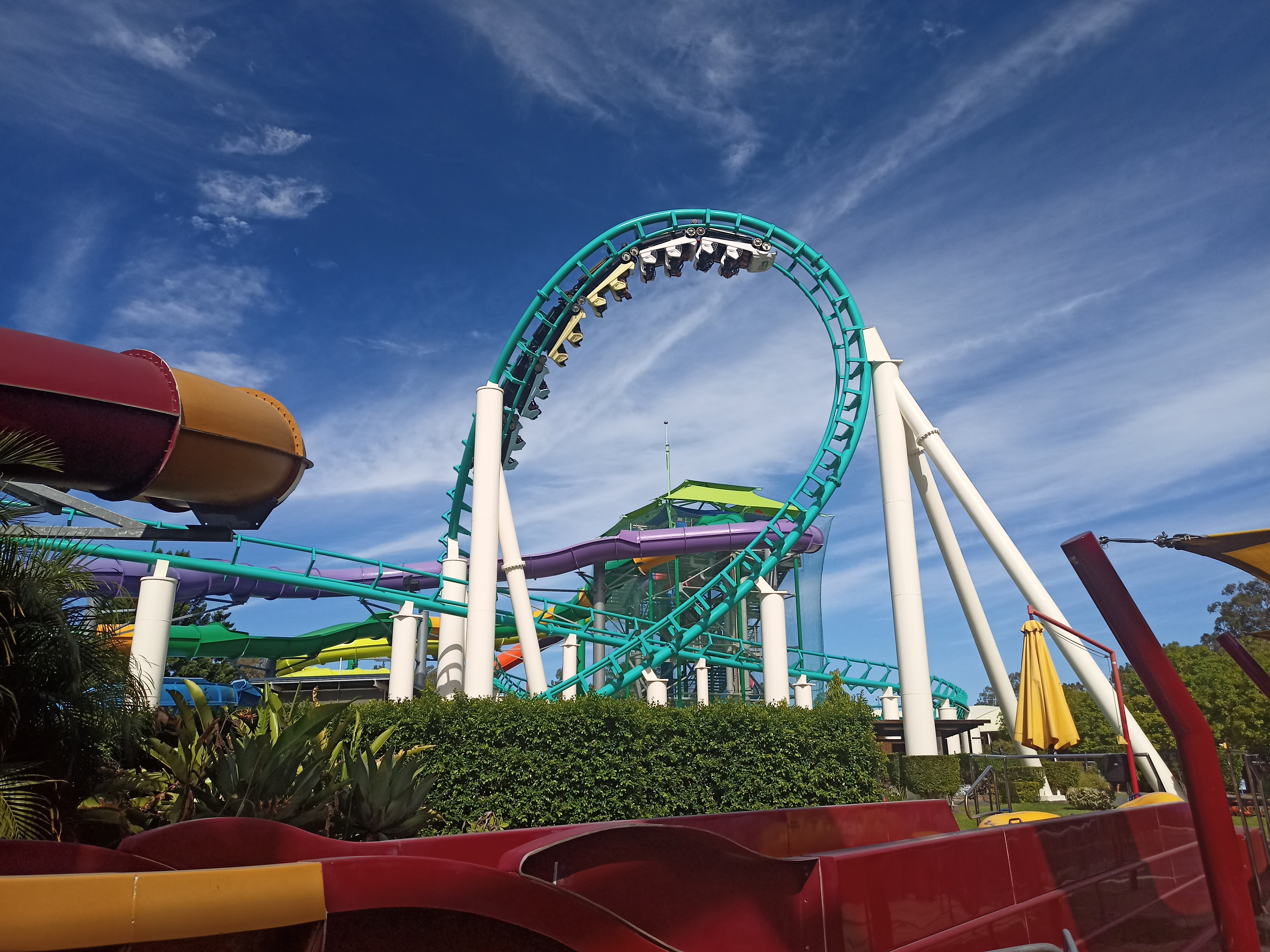
View of The Gold Coaster's reversed sidewinder at Dreamworld.

As of 2019, the company has built 102 roller coasters around the world.

Name	Model	Park	Country	Opened	Status	Ref
Wabash Cannonball	Corkscrew	Old Indiana Fun-n-Water Park; Opryland USA	United States	Unknown; 1975 to 1997	Removed	
Black Widow; Formerly Loop Coaster	Launched Loop	Old Indiana Fun-n-Water Park; Six Flags New England	United States	Unknown; 1977 to 1999	Removed	
Excalibur; Formerly Dexter Frebish's Electric Roller Ride	Mine Train	Frontier City; Six Flags AstroWorld	United States	Unknown; 1972 to 1998	Removed	
Mad Mouse	Mad Mouse	Broadway Grand Prix; Myrtle Beach Pavilion	United States	Unknown; 1998 to 2006	Removed	
Unknown; Formerly Lightning Bolt	Family Coaster	Granite Park; MGM Grand Adventures	United States	Unknown; 1993 to 2000	Removed	
Matterhorn Bobsleds	Bobsled	Disneyland	United States	1959	Operating	
Runaway Mine Train; Formerly Mine Train; Formerly Run-A-Way Mine Train	Mine Train	Six Flags Over Texas	United States	1966	Operating	
Dahlonega Mine Train	Mine Train	Six Flags Over Georgia	United States	1967	Operating	
Marche du Mille-pattes; Formerly Petites Montagnes Russes	Mini Mine Train	La Ronde	Canada	1967	Operating	
Mini Mine Train	Mini Mine Train	Six Flags Over Texas	United States	1969	Operating	
Serpent	Mini Mine Train	Six Flags AstroWorld	United States	1969	Removed	
Mini-Mine Train; Formerly Yahoola Hooler	Mini Mine Train	Six Flags Over Georgia	United States	1969	Removed	
Cedar Creek Mine Ride	Mine Train	Cedar Point	United States	1969	Operating	
Gold Rusher	Mine Train	Six Flags Magic Mountain	United States	1971	Operating	
River King Mine Train; Formerly Rail Blazer; Formerly River King Run-Away Mine Train	Mine Train	Mid America Adventure	United States	1971	Operating	
Carolina Goldrusher	Mine Train	Carowinds	United States	1973	Operating	
Trailblazer	Mine Train	Hersheypark	United States	1974	Operating	
Runaway Mine Train	Mine Train	Six Flags Great Adventure	United States	1974	Operating	
Space Mountain	Bobsled	Magic Kingdom	United States	1975	Operating	
Wacky Soap Box Racers; Formerly Cycle Chase	Steeplechase	Knott's Berry Farm	United States	1976	Removed	
Corkscrew	Looping Coaster	Cedar Point	United States	1976	Operating	
Demon; Formerly Turn Of The Century	Looping Coaster	California's Great America	United States	1976	Operating	
Demon; Formerly Turn Of The Century	Looping Coaster	Six Flags Great America	United States	1976	Operating	
Python	Corkscrew	Busch Gardens Tampa	United States	1976	Removed	
Double Loop	Looping Coaster	Geauga Lake	United States	1977	Removed	
Steeplechase	Steeplechase	Blackpool Pleasure Beach	United Kingdom	1977	Operating	
Loch Ness Monster	Looping Coaster	Busch Gardens Williamsburg	United States	1978	Operating	
Gemini	Racing Coaster	Cedar Point	United States	1978	Operating	
Corkscrew	Corkscrew	Michigan's Adventure	United States	1979	Operating	
Revolution; Formerly Irn-Bru Revolution	Launched Loop	Blackpool Pleasure Beach	United Kingdom	1979	Operating	
Corkscrew	Corkscrew	Nagashima Spa Land	Japan	1979	Operating	
Screw Coaster	Corkscrew	Nara Dreamland	Japan	1979	Removed	
Cork Screw	Corkscrew	Benyland	Japan	1979	Operating	
Corkscrew	Corkscrew	Toshimaen	Japan	1979	Removed	
Corkscrew	Looping Coaster	Valleyfair	United States	1980	Operating	
Space Salamander	Loop & Corkscrew	Expoland	Japan	1980	Removed	
Boomerang	Launched Loop	Tokyo Dome City	Japan	1980	Removed	
Carolina Cyclone	Looping Coaster	Carowinds	United States	1980	Operating	
Orient Express	Looping Coaster	Worlds of Fun	United States	1980	Removed	
Dragon Fyre (roller coaster); Formerly Dragon Fire	Looping Coaster	Canada's Wonderland	Canada	1981	Operating	
Bat	Suspended Coaster	Kings Island	United States	1981	Removed	
Sea Viper; Formerly Corkscrew	Loop & Corkscrew	Sea World	Australia	1981	Removed	
Vortex; Formerly Corkscrew; Formerly Turn Of The Century	Corkscrew	Calaway Park	Canada	1982	Operating	
Viper	Looping Coaster	Six Flags Darien Lake	United States	1982	Operating	
Dragon Mountain	Looping Coaster	Marineland Theme Park	Canada	1983	Closed	
Corkscrew	Corkscrew	Rusutsu Resort; Yatsu Yuenchi	Japan	1983; 1977 to 1982	Operating	
XLR-8	Suspended Coaster	Six Flags AstroWorld	United States	1984	Removed	
Steamin' Demon; Formerly Ragin' Cajun	Loop & Corkscrew	Great Escape; Pontchartrain Beach	United States	1984; 1978 to 1983	Operating	
Dragon	Looping Coaster	Ocean Park Hong Kong	China; Hong Kong	1984	Removed	
Big Bad Wolf	Suspended Coaster	Busch Gardens Williamsburg	United States	1984	Removed	
Corkscrew Coaster; Formerly Coca-Cola Rollercoaster	Loop & Corkscrew	Rainbow's End	New Zealand	1986	Operating	
Crazy Roller Coaster	Looping Coaster	Nanhu Amusement Park	China	1986	Removed	
Canobie Corkscrew; Formerly Corkscrew; Formerly Magic City Express; Formerly Chicago Loop	Corkscrew	Canobie Lake Park; Alabama State Fairgrounds; Old Chicago	United States	1987; 1982 to 1986; 1975 to 1980	Removed	
Halilintar	Loop & Corkscrew	Dunia Fantasi	Indonesia	1987	Operating	
Vortex	Looping Coaster	Kings Island	United States	1987	Removed	
Iron Dragon	Suspended Coaster	Cedar Point	United States	1987	Operating	
Thunderbolt Express; Formerly Demon; Formerly Screamin' Demon	Launched Loop	Camden Park; Kings Island	United States	1988; 1977 to 1987	Removed	
Rolling X-Train; Formerly Double Loop and Cork Screw	Looping Coaster	Everland	South Korea	1988	Operating	
Yagiyama Cyclone	Mine Train	Benyland	Japan	1988	Operating	
Ninja	Suspended Coaster	Six Flags Magic Mountain	United States	1988	Operating	
Shockwave	Looping Coaster	Six Flags Great America	United States	1988	Removed	
Great American Scream Machine	Looping Coaster	Six Flags Great Adventure	United States	1989	Removed	
Excalibur	Wood Coaster	Valleyfair	United States	1989	Operating	
Ninja; Formerly Scream Machine	Looping Coaster	Mid America Adventure; Expo '86	United States	1989; 1986	Operating	
Magnum XL-200	Hyper Coaster	Cedar Point	United States	1989	Operating	
Corkscrew	Corkscrew	Silverwood Theme Park; Knott's Berry Farm	United States	1990; 1975 to 1989	Operating	
Spiral; Formerly Extremeroller; Formerly EXT; Formerly Screamroller	Corkscrew	Formosa Fun Coast; Worlds of Fun	Taiwan	1990; 1976 to 1988	Removed	
Viper	Looping Coaster	Six Flags Magic Mountain	United States	1990	Operating	
Vampire	Suspended Coaster	Chessington World of Adventures	United Kingdom	1990	Operating	
Vortex	Suspended Coaster	Canada's Wonderland	Canada	1991	Closed	
Phantom's Revenge; Formerly Steel Phantom	Hyper Coaster	Kennywood	United States	1991	Operating	
Afterburner; Formerly Zoomerang; Formerly Flying Daredevil; Formerly Double-O	Launched Loop	Fun Spot; Boardwalk and Baseball	United States	1991; 1977 to 1990	Removed	
Anaconda	Looping Coaster	Kings Dominion	United States	1991	Removed	
Adventure Express	Mine Train	Kings Island	United States	1991	Operating	
Drachen Fire	Looping Coaster	Busch Gardens Williamsburg	United States	1992	Removed	
Hayabusa	Suspended Coaster	Tokyo SummerLand	Japan	1992	Removed	
Eagle Fortress	Suspended Coaster	Everland	South Korea	1992	Removed	
Python; Formerly Lightnin' Loops	Launched Loop	Six Flags America; Six Flags Great Adventure	United States	1993; 1978 to 1992	Removed	
Diamond Back; Formerly Lightnin' Loops	Launched Loop	Frontier City; Six Flags Great Adventure	United States	1993; 1978 to 1986	Operating	
Fantasia Special	Looping Coaster	Tongdo Fantasia	South Korea	1993	Operating	
Bat; Formerly Flight Deck; Formerly Top Gun	Suspended Coaster	Kings Island	United States	1993	Operating	
Thunderation	Mine Train	Silver Dollar City	United States	1993	Operating	
Canyon Blaster	Looping Coaster	Adventuredome	United States	1993	Operating	
Desperado	Hyper Coaster	Buffalo Bill's Resort & Casino	United States	1994	Closed	
Titan MAX; Formerly Titan V Formerly Titan	Hyper Coaster	Space World	Japan	1994	Removed	
Big One; Formerly Pepsi Max Big One	Hyper Coaster	Blackpool Pleasure Beach	United Kingdom	1994	Operating	
Diablo	Mine Train	PortAventura Park	Spain	1995	Operating	
Sidewinder; Formerly Roaring Tornado	Launched Loop	Elitch Gardens; Elitch Gardens; Magic Springs & Crystal Falls	United States	1995; 1990 to 1994; 1980 to 1989	Operating	
Roller Coaster; Formerly Corkscrew	Corkscrew	MGM Dizzee World; Geauga Lake	India	1996; 1978 to 1995	Operating	
Roller Coaster	Looping Coaster	Al-Sha'ab Leisure Park	Kuwait	1996	Closed	
Road Runner Express	Mine Train	Six Flags Fiesta Texas	United States	1997	Operating	
Wild Thing; Formerly Loop Corkscrew	Loop & Corkscrew	Wild Waves Theme & Water Park; Rocky Point Park	United States	1997; 1984 to 1995	Operating	
Mad Mouse	Mad Mouse	Michigan's Adventure	United States	1999	Operating	
Tennessee Tornado	Looping Coaster	Dollywood	United States	1999	Operating	
Mad Mouse	Mad Mouse	Valleyfair	United States	1999	Operating	
Montaña Rusa; Formerly Corkscrew	Corkscrew	Salitre Magico; Myrtle Beach Pavilion; Magic Harbor	Colombia	2000; 1978 to 1999; 1975 to 1977	Operating	
Psycho Mouse	Mad Mouse	California's Great America	United States	2001	Operating	
The Gold Coaster; Formerly Hot Wheels Sidewinder; Formerly Cyclone; Formerly Big Dipper	Looping Coaster	Dreamworld; Luna Park	Australia	2001; 1995 to 2001	Operating	
Big Bad John; Formerly Thunder Express; Formerly River King Mine Train; Formerly River King Run-Away Mine Train	Mine Train	Magic Springs & Crystal Falls; Dollywood; Mid America Adventure	United States	2002; 1989 to 1998; 1971 to 1987	Operating	
X2; Formerly X	4th Dimension Coaster	Six Flags Magic Mountain	United States	2002	Closed	
Canyon Blaster; Formerly Rock n' Roller Coaster; Formerly Timber Topper	Mine Train	Great Escape; Old Indiana Fun-n-Water Park; Opryland USA	United States	2003; Unknown; 1972 to 1997	Operating	
Zimerman; Formerly Revolution	Loop & Corkscrew	Gloria's Fantasyland; DelGrosso's Amusement Park; Libertyland	Philippines	2014; Unknown; 1979 to 2005	Operating	

== Thrill rides ==
=== Carousels ===
Name	Model	Location	Opened	Closed	Details
Unknown	20-foot (6.10 m) Carrousel	Alum Rock park San Jose, California	1947	Operating	relocated to Daniels Wood Land Paso Robles California Arrows first ride
Unknown	20-foot (6.10 m) Carrousel	Red Barn in Aromas, California	before 1950	Operating	
Big Top Carousel	45-foot (13.72 m) Carrousel	Playland, Fresno, California	1950's	Operating	
Antique Carousel	36-foot (10.97 m) Carrousel	Pixieland Amusement Park	1955~	Operating	
Charlie's Carousel	36-foot (10.97 m) Carrousel	Bishop's Pumpkin Farm	2014	Operating	Originally opened in about 1958. Relocated from Balboa Fun Zone in Newport Beach, California and Santa's Village in Scotts Valley, California before that.
Unknown	36-foot (10.97 m) Carrousel	Santa's Village	1950s	1979	Ride built in about 1958. Closed with park in 1979 but remained standing but not operating until its removal in 1985. Relocated to Balboa Fun Zone and later to Bishop's Pumpkin Farm.
Unknown	36-foot (10.97 m) Carrousel	Balboa Fun Zone	1986	2011	Relocated from Santa's Village and restored by son of one of Arrow's founders. Relocated to Bishop's Pumpkin Farm.

=== Narrow gauge/miniature trains ===
Name	Park	Model	Opened	Closed	Details
BuJu Line Express	Burke Junction	2 ft 6 in (762 mm) gauge Miniature Train	1981	relocated Patterson California	Relocated from Frontier Village.
San Mateo Central Park Train	Central Park, San Mateo, California	12 in (305 mm) gauge Miniature Train F-9	1950	Operating	
Mountain Train Ride	Confusion Hill	20 in (508 mm) gauge Miniature Train F-9	1955	Operating	#243 Redwood Explorer
Frontier Village Railroad	Frontier Village	2 ft 6 in (762 mm) gauge Miniature Train	1961	Closed	Relocated to Burke Junction. Also referred to as Frontier Village and Southern Pacific Railroad. Ride included performers who portrayed western characters.
Old 99	Six Flags Great Escape	2 ft 6 in (762 mm) gauge Miniature Train	~1955	Relocated	
Magic Forest Railroad	Magic Forest Park	2 ft 6 in (762 mm) gauge Miniature Train	Unknown	Operating	
#9	Timbavati Wildlife Park Safari Train	2 ft 6 in (762 mm) 30" Mine Train	1957	Relocated	
#9	Ghost Town Train	2 ft 6 in (762 mm) 30" Mine Train	~1954	Unknown	
#345	Memphis Fairgrounds	Miniature Train F-9	Unknown	Unknown	
#291 D" D" Special	Peony Park, Omaha Nebraska	Miniature Train F-9	Unknown	Unknown	
Pixieland Express	Pixieland Amusement Park	20 in (508 mm) gauge Miniature Train	~1961	Operating	
#413 Streamliner	Roseburg, Oregon	Miniature Train F-9	Unknown	Unknown	
Cloverline Railroad	Sandland Adventures	2 ft (610 mm) gauge Miniature Train F-9	1961	Operating	
#6 Cave Train	Santa Cruz Beach Boardwalk	3 ft (914 mm) gauge Miniature Train	1961	Operating	
Honest Abe number 9	Santafair Park Federal, Washington	3 ft (914 mm) gauge Miniature Train	~1960	Closed	Relocated to Paso Robles California
#212 Playtown Streamliner	Town & Country Village, Palo Alto, CA	Miniature Train F-9	Unknown	Unknown	
#1993 Arrow Streamliner	Uesugi Farms	Miniature Train F-9	Unknown	Operating	
#216 Rotary Chief	Playtown Roeding park, Fresno, Ca	Miniature train F-9	1955	Closed	Relocated to Rio Linda CA private owner

=== Car rides ===
Name	Model	Location	Opened	Closed	Details
Avis Antique Car Ride	Car Ride	1964 New York World's Fair	1964	1965	Sponsored by Avis. After closure, cars relocated to Adventureland (New York).
Antique Roadsters Formerly Jaunty Jeeps	Antique Cars	Adventureland (Iowa)	1974	1987	Operated with jeep vehicles from 1974 through 1978, and then antique car vehicles from 1979 through closure.
Antique Cars	Antique Touring	Adventureland (New York)	1978	Operating	Originally used vehicles from the 1964 New York World's Fair. Vehicles replaced with electric versions in the 1990s.
Antique Cars	Antique Touring	Centreville Amusement Park	1967	Operating	
Hubcap Alley Antique Cars	Antique Touring	Beech Bend Park	2002	Operating	
Antique Car Ride	Antique Cadillac M-6Z	Boblo Island Amusement Park	1972	1993	
Grand Prix	Sports Cars	Pleasure Beach Resort	1960	2023	Originally powered by petrol engines, but converted to electric in 2002. The ride ceased operations at the end of the 2023 season with final rides given at a private event in June 2024
Le Mans Raceway	Flyer	Busch Gardens Williamsburg	1975	2006	Three intertwined tracks with 49 vehicles. Replaced with Griffon.
Barney Oldfields Redwood Rally	Unknown	California's Great America	1976	Operating	Originally named after race car driver Barney Oldfield. Track reconfigured from original figure-eight layout to an oval at some point.
Antique Cars	1930s Ford Model A	Canobie Lake Park	1968	Operating	
Canobie 500	Sports Cars	Canobie Lake Park	1977	Operating	
Carolina Turnpike Formerly Speedway	Sports Cars	Carowinds	1973	1991	Replaced with Vortex. After park's Exxon Hillbilly Jalopies closed, its vehicles were used on this track alongside the sports cars.
Exxon Hillbilly Jalopies	Jalopy	Carowinds	1973	1987	Replaced with White Water Falls. After closure, cars ran on park's Carolina Turnpike track for several additional seasons.
Antique Cars	1910 Cadillac Touring	Cedar Point	1969	2021	Originally ride crossed over remnants of old lagoon system. Cars previously navigated track in opposite direction. In 2021 ride was removed and replaced with "Farmhouse kitchen", which opened for the 2022 season.
Cadillac Cars	1910 Cadillac Touring	Cedar Point	1958	Operating	Originally used side barriers to keep guests on track. Later changed to single guide rail in the center.
Turnpike Cars	Sports Cars	Cedar Point	1959	2014	Originally consisted of two tracks. Reduced to one track with addition of Raptor in 1994. Remaining track removed for addition of Valravn in 2016.
Turnpike	Unknown	Coney Island (Cincinnati, Ohio)	1958	1971	Opened with cars from Streifthau Manufacturing Company but received Arrow Development cars in 1966. Center guide rail added the same season. Ride was 1,876 feet (572 m) long with light poles installed every 60 feet (18 m) along the track.
Antique Auto Ride	Ford & Maxwell	Dogpatch, USA (Harrison, Arkansas)	1968	1993	Seven vehicles total.
Sunoco Turnpike	Flyer	Dutch Wonderland	1972	Operating	
Antique Cars	Unknown	Fantasy Island	1961	2019	Includes combination of cars from Arrow Development and Gould Manufacturing.
Horseless Carriage	1910 Cadillac Touring	Freedomland U.S.A.	1960	1964	Traveled through New England countryside. Half-mile long. Also referred to as Cadillac Cars.
Antique Autos	Maxwell, Ford Model T	Frontier Village	1962 or earlier	1980	Three-fifths size.
Duster-Turnpike	Flyer	Frontier Village	1962 or later	1980	Second antique car ride added for capacity.
Merry Oldies	Oldsmobile Antique Car	Geauga Lake	1972	2007	
Twin Turnpike – Antique Cars	Antique Touring	Hersheypark	1975	Operating	
Twin Turnpike – Sports Cars	Sports Cars	Hersheypark	1975	Operating	
Blue Ridge Tollway	Ford	Kings Dominion	1975	Operating	
Antique Cars; Formerly Les Taxis	French Taxi, Ford	Kings Island	1972	2004	Featured French Taxis until the Ford vehicles from the Ohio Overland Automobile Livery track were transposed to it in the late 1990s. Original French Taxis then sold to Magic Springs and Crystal Falls. After ride closed in 2004, vehicles later relocated to sister park Worlds of Fun.
Ohio Overland Automobile Livery	Ford	Kings Island	1972	2004	Standing but not operating from late 1990s through demolition in 2004. When ride closed, its Ford vehicles were transposed to the opposite Les Taxis track.
Sunshine Turnpike (East) Formerly Marathon Turnpike	Sports Cars	Kings Island	1972	1994	Shortened and merged with the Sunshine Turnpike (West) track starting with the 1982 season.
Sunshine Turnpike (West) Formerly Marathon Turnpike	Sports Cars	Kings Island	1972	1981	Shortened and merged with the Sunshine Turnpike (East) track starting with 1982 season.
Antique Cars	Antique Touring	Lake Winnepesaukah	Unknown	Operating	
Antique Cars	1911 Maxwell Touring	West View Park	1963	1977	
Traffique Jam	Antique Touring Special	Six Flags Great America	1976	1983	
Tin Lizzies	Antique Touring Gas	West View Park	Unknown	1977	
Le Taxi Tour	French Taxi	Worlds of Fun	1973	Operating	
Tijuana Taxi	Flyer, Ford, Maxwell	Knott's Berry Farm	1969	1976	
Antique Cars	Antique Touring Gas	Legend City, Tempe Arizona	Unknown	1983	
Blakely Speedway	Sports Cars	Legend City, Tempe Arizona	Unknown	1983	
Tin Lizzie	Model T	Opryland	Unknown	1997	
Dino Off Road Adventure	Antique Touring M-60 Gas	Six Flags New England, Agawam, Massachusetts	Unknown	Unknown	
Speedway Sr.	Sports Cars	Lagoon	1969	2000	
Hanson Cars	Hanson Roadster	Six Flags Over Georgia	1967	Operating	1,000 feet (300 m) long.
Chaparral Antique Cars	1913 Cleburne Chaparral	Six Flags Over Texas	1962	Operating	
Le Taxi	French Taxi	Six Flags AstroWorld	1968	2005	
Moon Antique Cars	1920s Moon Continental	Mid America Adventure	1971	2021	
Horseless Carriages	Arrow Flyers	Old Tucson Studios Tucson Az	1960	Closed	Originally had the Ford Touring Cars 4 seater then Went to The Arrow Flyer a 2 seater

=== Flume and other boat rides ===
Name	Model	Location	Opened	Closed	Details
Log Flume Ride (1)	Log Flume	1964 New York World's Fair	1964	1965	One of two log flumes at the fair. Relocated to Dollywood in Pigeon Forge, Tennessee after fair ended.
Log Flume Ride (2)	Log Flume	1964 New York World's Fair	1964	1965	One of two log flumes at the fair. Relocated to Pirates World in Dania, Florida after fair ended.
Rim Runner	Shoot-the-Chute	Adventuredome	1993	2013	Included double drop. Replaced with El Loco. The boat storage area, lift hill, and trough leading to the drop still remain.
Woodchuck Run Formerly Cahaba Falls	Log Flume	Alabama Splash Adventure	1998	2011	Ride in storage during the 2003 and 2004 seasons.
Boji Falls Log Flume	Log Flume	Arnolds Park	2001	Operating	Relocated from and donated by Morey's Piers. Reportedly $2 million ride, which cost $700,000 to relocate. Relocation was done with assistance from International Rides Management (IRM).
Water Flume	Log Flume	Astroland	1964	2008	1,052 feet (320.65 m) long.
Log Ride	Log Flume	Bell's Amusement Park (Tulsa, Oklahoma)	1970s	Closed	1,198 feet (365.15 m) long. Included components from Pirates World flume, which in turn had been relocated from the 1964-65 New York World's Fair. Ride currently in storage.
Adventure Canyon Log Flume Ride	Log Flume	Buffalo Bill's Casino & Hotel	1994	Operating	1,600 feet (487.68 m) long. Traveled inside and outside of casino. Crosses Desperado six times. Includes targets that riders could shoot with laser guns. Operates intermittently.
Ya-Hoo Log Flume	Log Flume	Busch Gardens Los Angeles	1973 or earlier	Closed	Double barrel log flume. Components relocated to Great Escape.
Tanganyika Tidal Wave	Shoot-the-Chute	Busch Gardens Tampa Bay	1989	2016	Replaced African Queen Boat Ride and re-used many of the former attraction's tributaries. Included a 55-foot drop at the end. Ride remained standing but not operating after its closure until 2018, when it was demolished to accommodate Tigris. Some of the ride's rockwork was retained for usage on the new roller coaster's queue.
Le Scoot	Barrel	Busch Gardens Williamsburg	1975	Operating	1,419 feet (432.51 m) long. Underwent large refurbishment starting after the 2012 season. Previously included a spillway drop.
Loggers Run	Log Flume	California's Great America	1976	2017	1,902 feet (579.73 m) long. Included a double downchute. Ride originally intertwined with Yankee Clipper. Layout altered for addition of Stealth roller coaster in 2000.
Yankee Clipper	Hydroflume	California's Great America	1976	1998	1,955 feet (595.88 m) long. Intertwined with Loggers Run. Removed for the addition of Stealth.
Wild Thornberrys River Adventure Formerly Powder Keg	Double Barrel	Carowinds	1973	2009	1,636 feet (498.65 m) long. Included a spillway drop. Had double-barrel boats. Renamed and rethemed off The Wild Thornberrys TV show for the 2003 season. Replaced with Intimidator.
Mill Race Formerly Nestea Plunge	Log Flume	Cedar Point	1963	1993	1,230 feet (374.90 m) long. Only operated for two weeks in 1963, during which time it was considered "testing". Marketed as "new" for 1964.
White Water Landing	Hydroflume	Cedar Point	1982	2005	2,370 feet (722.38 m) long. Replaced with Maverick. Its station remains and is used for Maverick's queue line.
Shoot the Rapids (1)	Log Flume	Cedar Point	1967	1981	Replaced with White Water Landing.
Shoot the Rapids (2)	Log Flume	Cedar Point	1967	1981	Replaced with White Water Landing.
Log Flume Ride	Log Flume	Centreville Amusement Park	1972	Operating	584 feet (178.00 m) long with a 24 foot drop.
Log Flume	Log Flume	Coney Island (Cincinnati, Ohio)	1968	1971	1,497 feet (456.29 m) long. Added at cost of $500,000. Ride relocated to Kings Island after park closure.
Thunder Rapids	Log Flume	Darien Lake	1981	Closed	1,370 feet (417.58 m) long. Included tunneled sections. Replaced with Tantrum.
Country Fair Falls	Log Flume	Dollywood	1966	2004	1,214 feet (370.03 m) long. Relocated from the 1964 New York World's Fair.
El Aserradero (#1)	Log Flume	Six Flags Over Texas	1963	Closed	First Arrow Development log flume. 1,240 feet (380 m) long. Currently standing but not operating.
Drench Falls Log Flume	Log Flume	Blackpool Pleasure Beach	1967	2006	Opened as world's longest log flume at 2,349 feet (715.98 m) long. Station refurbished for 2000 season with conveyor belt loading. Removed to make way for Infusion. During the ride's demolition, an earring thought to have belonged to actress Marlene Dietrich was discovered.
Wild River	Log Flume	Fort Fun (Germany)	1979	Open	Manufactured by Mack Rides; Arrow Development's involvement unknown.
Unknown	Log Flume	Jolly Roger Park	Unknown	Unknown	Relocated from Beech Bend and the '82 Knoxville World's Fair. 591 feet (180.14 m) long.
La Pitoune	Log Flume	La Ronde	1967	2017	1,334 feet (406.60 m) long.
Waterfall Flume	Log Flume	Old Indiana Fun Park	Unknown	Unknown	590 feet (179.83 m) long. Demountable prototype.
Sparklett's Log Flume	Log Flume	State Fair of Texas	1981	Operating	607 feet (185.01 m) long. Relocated from Old Chicago. Only operates during fair (24 days).
Log Jamboree (#1)	Log Flume	Six Flags Over Georgia	1967	1990	1,260 feet (384.05 m) long. Removed 1990 or 1991.
El Aserradero (#2)	Log Flume	Six Flags Over Texas	1968	Operating	1,240 feet (377.95 m) long. Includes a tunneled drop.
Log Jamboree (#2)	Log Flume	Six Flags Over Georgia	1968	Operating	1,252 feet (381.61 m) long.
Bamboo Shoot	Log Flume	Six Flags AstroWorld	1969	2005	1,242 feet (378.56 m) long. Featured custom logs to resemble bamboo boats.
Log Flume	Log Flume	Pixieland	1969	Closed	Relocated to Lagoon in Farmington, Utah, where it opened in 1975.
Log Flume	Log Flume	Lagoon Park (Farmington, Utah)	1975	2022	Relocated from Pixieland in Otis Junction, Oregon. 607 feet (185 m) long with a maximum height of 30 feet (9.1 m).
Buck Sawyer's Mill	Log Flume	Magic Landing (Texas)	1984	Closed	800 feet (243.84 m) long.
Wilderness Adventure Ride	Log Flume	Ontario Place	1985	2011	2,182 feet (665.07 m) long. Heavily themed.
Unknown	Log Flume	Mitsubishi Trading Company	1986	Unknown	908 feet (276.76 m) long.
Roaring Creek Log Flume	Log Flume	Silverwood	1990	Operating	Relocated from Kentucky Kingdom. 1,300 feet (396.24 m) long.
Unknown	Log Flume	Kentucky Kingdom	1987	Closed	Relocated to Silverwood. 1,300 feet (396.24 m) long.
Texas Splash Down	Log Flume	SeaWorld San Antonio	1991	2011	Relocated from Boardwalk and Baseball. 2,180 feet (664.46 m) long.
Grand Rapids Log Flume	Log Flume	Boardwalk and Baseball	1987	1990	2,180 feet (664.46 m) long. Added at a cost of $2 million. Relocated to SeaWorld San Antonio.
Saw Mill Plunge	Log Flume	Lake Compounce	1987	Unknown	1,437 feet (438.00 m) long. 46 foot lift on mountainside.
Unknown	Log Flume	Tusenfryd (Norway)	1988	Unknown	1,100 feet (335.28 m) long. 41 foot lift hill.
Unknown	Log Flume	Formosa Fun Coast	1992	Closed	1,509 feet (459.94 m) long. Removed by summer 2016 based on satellite imagery.
Log Flume	Log Flume	Magic Harbor (Myrtle Beach, South Carolina)	1969	1990s	607 feet (185.01 m) long.
Timber Mountain Log Ride	Log Flume	Knott's Berry Farm	1969	Operating	2,041 feet (622.10 m) long. Partially enclosed.
Logger's Run	Log Flume	Michigan's Adventure	1982	Operating	1,312 feet (399.90 m) long. 40 foot lift.
Flume Ride	Log Flume	Toshimaen	1970	2020	1,083 feet (330.10 m) long.
Log Flume	Log Flume	Hunt's Pier	1970	1998	806 feet (245.67 m) long. Relocated.
Log Flume (#1) Formerly Hoo Hoo Log Flume	Log Flume	Mid America Adventure	1971	Operating	1,245 feet (379.48 m) long. One of two twin log flumes. Named in honor of the Concatenated Order of Hoo-Hoo lumbermen.
Log Flume (#2) Formerly Hoo Hoo Log Flume	Log Flume	Mid America Adventure	1971	Operating	1,248 feet (380.39 m) long. One of two twin log flumes. Named in honor of the Concatenated Order of Hoo-Hoo lumbermen.
Log Jammer	Log Flume	Six Flags Magic Mountain	1971	2011	2,304 feet (702.26 m) long.
Jet Stream	Hydroflume	Six Flags Magic Mountain	1972	Operating	2,051 feet (625.14 m) long. First Arrow hydroflume and first Arrow flume to feature a turntable loading system.
The Log Flume	Log Flume	Miracle Strip Amusement Park	1972	2004	1,233 feet (375.82 m) long.
Unknown	Log Flume	Ocean Park	1982	Unknown	1,729 feet (527.00 m) long. 54 foot lift.
Flume Zoom	Log Flume	Opryland USA	1972	Closed	1,306 feet (398.07 m) long. Located in a heavily wooded setting.
Desperado Plunge	Barrel	Storytown, USA/Six Flags Great Escape	1978	Operating	Relocated from Busch Gardens park in California. 1,535 feet (467.87 m) long.
Stanley Falls	Barrel	Busch Gardens Tampa	1973	2025	1,604 feet (488.90 m) long. Previously included a spillway drop.
Coal Cracker	Hydroflume	Hersheypark	1973	Operating	1,529 feet (466.04 m) long. Includes a hydro-jump at the base of its twin chutes drop. One of the early Arrow hydroflumes to feature a turntable loading system.
FlumeRide	Log Flume	Liseberg, Gothenburg, Sweden	1973	Operating	1,961 feet (597.71 m) long.
Viking Voyager	Viking Flume	Worlds of Fun	1973	Operating	1,309 feet (398.98 m) long. Includes Viking boats.
Log Flume - Gold Rush Saw Mill Formerly The Flume, Log Flume, Nestea Log Flume, 7-Up Log Flume	Log Flume	Six Flags Great Adventure	1974	Operating	Originally included a spillway drop. Reportedly 2,160 feet (660 m) or 2,170 feet (661.42 m) long.
Rocky's Rapids	Log Flume	Indiana Beach	Unknown	Operating	1,045 feet (318.52 m) long. Relocated from Pontchartrain Beach.
Unknown	Log Flume	Pontchartrain Beach	1974	Unknown	1,045 feet (318.52 m) long. Relocated to Indiana Beach.
Riptide	Hydroflume	Six Flags Great Adventure	1975	2006	1,598 feet (487.07 m) long.
Unknown	Log Flume	Old Chicago	1975	Closed	607 feet (185.01 m) long. Relocated to State Fair of Texas.
Log Jammer	Log Flume	Kennywood	1975	2017	1,555 feet (473.96 m) long. Included a spillway drop.
Old Hickory	Log Flume	Libertyland	1976	2006	907 feet (276.45 m) long. All concrete.
Wildwasserfahrt	Log Flume	Hansapark (formerly: Hansaland) (Sierksdorf, Germany)	1977	Operating	1,320 feet (402.34 m) long. Concrete.
Log Flume	Log Flume	Frontierland (England)	1982	1999	740 feet (225.55 m) long. Remained standing but not operating from park closure in 1999 until it was demolished in 2009.
AQUAMAN Splashdown Formerly Yankee Clipper	Hydroflume	Six Flags Great America	1976	Operating	1,955 feet (595.88 m) long. Intertwined with Loggers Run.
Loggers Run	Log Flume	Six Flags Great America	1976	Operating	1,902 feet (579.73 m) long. Includes a double downchute. Intertwined with AQUAMAN Splashdown.
Log Flume	Log Flume	Funtown Pier (Seaside Heights, New Jersey)	1977	1997	2,060 feet (627.89 m) long. Included a rotary station. Reportedly placed in storage after removal from park before being ultimately scrapped.
Double Splash Flume	Log Flume	Dutch Wonderland	1977	Operating	807 feet (245.97 m) long. Concrete.
Logger's Revenge	Log Flume	Santa Cruz Beach Boardwalk	1977	Operating	1,214 feet (370.03 m) long.
Splinter	Log Flume	Elitch Gardens	1978	1994	1,306 feet (398.07 m) long, 45 feet (13.72 m) tall. Built at a cost of $2.5 million. Took riders past six displays that gave a visual history of the lumber industry.
Tiroler Wildwasserbahn	Log Flume	Europa Park	1978	Open	1,467 feet (447.14 m) long. Refurbished in 2005 with new boats from Mack Rides.
Shenandoah Lumber Company	Log Flume	Kings Dominion	1975	Operating	1,501 feet (457.50 m) long.
Haunted River	Log Flume	Kings Dominion	1980	1995	Partially enclosed. 1,432 feet (436.47 m) long.
Kenton's Cove Keelboat Canal	Hydroflume	Kings Island	1973	2000	1,758 feet (535.84 m) long. Originally included small hill at base of drop. One of the early Arrow hydroflumes to feature a turntable loading system. Replaced by Tomb Raider: The Ride.
Charlie Brown’s Rushing River Log Ride Formerly Kings Mill Log Flume, Wild Thornberry's River Adventure, Race For Your Life Charlie Brown	Log Flume	Kings Island	1972	Operating	1,497 feet (456.29 m) long. Ride relocated from Cincinnati's Coney Island. Closed during the 2000 season and heavily overhauled by Hopkins Rides.
Smurf's Enchanted Voyage Formerly Enchanted Voyage	Boat Ride	Kings Island	1972	1991	Included outdoor rotary loading platform. Rethemed for 1984 season.
L’Ile Aux Tresors	Rub-a-Dub	La Ronde	1960s	Unknown	
Rub-a-Dub	Rub-a-Dub	Six Flags AstroWorld	1968~	1976	
Gulliver's Rub-a-Dub	Rub-a-Dub	Kings Island	1972	1981	

=== Other rides ===
Name	Model	Location	Opened	Status	Details
Alice in Wonderland	Dark Ride	Blackpool Pleasure Beach	1961	Operating	Housed in 10,000 square-foot stone castle. First Arrow ride outside of the United States.
Anheuser-Busch Skyrail	Suspended Monorail	Busch Gardens Los Angeles	1966	1979	3,500 feet (1,100 m) long. Attraction ended in a 17 acres (69,000 m^{2}) beer garden with birds, a boat ride, and beer pavilions. Arrow only fabricated the attraction's cars.
Blackbeard's Revenge	Madhouse	Carowinds	1985	1999	Originally made its debut at the 1984 Louisiana World Exposition. Removed for addition of Nickelodeon Flying Super Saturator.
Earthquake	Dark Ride	Cedar Point	1965	1984	Based on the 1906 San Francisco earthquake. Relocated from Freedomland U.S.A. Originally intended to open at Cedar Point in 1964 but delayed due to a transportation worker strike. Replaced with Berenstein Bear Country.
Pirate Ride	Dark Ride	Cedar Point	1966	1996	Relocated from Freedomland U.S.A. Building is still standing and now used for storage. Some figures from the attraction remain at the park and are used as HalloWeekends decorations.
Space Whirl	Tea Cup	Century 21 Exposition	1962	1962	Tea cup style attraction. Relocated to Fantasy Island.
Bat Cave	Dark Ride	Coney Island (Cincinnati, Ohio)	1960	Closed	Originally opened as The Spook before being re-themed in 1966. Dark ride with a series of comical and scary stunts. Four-seat cars resembled old-time automobiles.
Lil Belle	Stern Wheel Paddleboat	Peralta Playland, Oakland, California	1952	Unknown	
Snowball	Tea Cup	Santa's Village	1958~	Closed	
Space Whirl	Tea Cup	Fantasy Island	1963	1976	Purchased from Century 21 Exposition in Seattle.
Danny the Dragon	Tram	Freedomland U.S.A.	1960	Closed	Motorized scenic ride with cars shaped like a dragon. Freedomland received two dragons. The green Danny was relocated to Great Escape. Nothing has been found about the red Danny.
Lost Dutchman	Dark Ride	Frontier Village	1961	Closed	Originally known as The Lost Frontier Mine. Dark ride with blacklight lit interiors.
Danny the Dragon	Tram	Great Escape	1965	1996	Motorized scenic ride with cars shaped like a dragon. Relocated from Freedomland U.S.A.
Spacewhirl	Spacewhirl/Teacup	Seattle World's Fair	1962	Unknown	
Tales of the Okefenokee	Dark Ride	Six Flags Over Georgia	1967	Closed	Replaced in 1980 by Monster Plantation. Monster Plantation continues to run on the original track.
Cup and Saucer	Spacewhirl/Teacup	Astroworld	1968~	Unknown	
Sombrero	Tea Cup	Knott's Berry Farm	1969~	Operating	
Haunted Castle	Dark Ride	Santa Cruz Beach-Boardwalk	Unknown	Operating	Remodeled/rebuilt 2010
Kooky Castle?	Dark Ride	Pontchartrain Beach	Unknown	Unknown	
Hershey's Chocolate Tour	Special Systems	Hershey, Pennsylvania	1973	Operating	
Mine Cave	Dark Ride	Freedomland U.S.A.	1960	Closed	Parts of interior featured in the train tunnel of Storytown USA/The Great Escape. Since removed.
Tornado	Dark Ride	Freedomland U.S.A.	1960	Closed	Moved to Kennywood Amusement Park after 1962 season. Sold to Storytown USA/The Great Escape, where it operated from 1967 until 2002.

=== Disney property rides ===
Name	Model	Location	Opened	Closed	Details
"it's a small world"	Boat Ride	1964 New York World's Fair	1964	1965	Sponsored by Pepsi-Cola/UNICEF and part of the Pepsi Pavilion. Relocated to Disneyland after fair's closure.
"it's a small world"	Boat Ride	Disneyland	1966	Operating	Relocated from 1964 New York World's Fair.
Adventure Thru Inner Space	Omnimover	Disneyland	1967	1985	Replaced with Star Tours.
Alice in Wonderland	Dark Ride	Disneyland	1958	Operating	Enhanced for 1984 Fantasyland re-opening.
Casey Jr. Circus Train	Special System	Disneyland	1955	Operating	
Dumbo the Flying Elephant	Special System	Disneyland	1955	1975	Originally opened with 10 elephant ride vehicles, each with flapping ears. The flapping ears caused problems and were later replaced with stationary ones. The ride was slightly relocated within the park in 1983. The whole unit was replaced with a newer, larger version of the same ride in 1990 after an incident occurred on April 1, 1990.
Flight to the Moon	Special System	Disneyland	1955	1992	Attraction also referred to as Rocket to the Moon and later as Mission to Mars. The original attraction was demolished after the ride's closure in 1966 and a new, larger show building with two theaters was constructed. The Mission to Mars variation of the attraction closed on November 2, 1992.
Haunted Mansion	Omnimover	Disneyland	1969	Operating	Attraction includes a continuously-moving chain of vehicles that are capable of rotating in different directions so that riders may face scenes.
King Arthur Carrousel	72-foot (21.95 m), 4 Course Carrousel	Disneyland	1955	Operating	Carousel originally built by Dentzel Carousel Company in 1922 and operated at Sunnyside Beach Park in Toronto, Ontario, Canada. Arrow Development refurbished the attraction after it was purchased for Disneyland.
Mad Tea Party	Tea Cup	Disneyland	1955	Operating	Spinning tea cups attraction with 18 vehicles divided between three rotating platforms.
Motor Boat Cruise	Boat Ride	Disneyland	1957	1993	Re-themed in 1993 as Motor Boat Cruise to Gummi Glen as part of a Disney Afternoon event. Attraction's loading dock remains in place and is used for waterside dining.
Mr. Toad's Wild Ride	Dark Ride	Disneyland	1955	1982	Ride has since been re-built as part of large Fantasyland overhaul with new track, cars, and interiors.
Pirates of the Caribbean	Special System	Disneyland	1967	Operating	Indoor boat ride with pirate-themed show scenes.
Snow White's Scary Adventures	Dark Ride	Disneyland	1955	1982	Indoor dark ride. Ride has since been re-built as part of large Fantasyland overhaul.
Dumbo the Flying Elephant	Special System	Walt Disney World	1971	Operating	
Haunted Mansion	Omnimover	Walt Disney World	1971	Operating	
Cinderella's Golden Carrousel	65-foot (19.81 m), 5 Course Carrousel	Walt Disney World	1971	Operating	
It's a Small World	Boat Ride	Walt Disney World	1971	Operating	
Mad Tea Party	Tea Cup	Walt Disney World	1971	Operating	
Flight to the Moon	Special System	Walt Disney World	1971	1975	
Mr. Toad's Wild Ride	Dark Ride	Walt Disney World	1971	1998	
Snow White's Scary Adventures	Dark Ride	Walt Disney World	1971	2012	
Peter Pan's Flight	Dark Ride	Walt Disney World	1971	Operating	
