= Santa's Village =

Santa's Village may refer to:

- The mythological Santa's workshop

In the United States:

- Santa's Village AZoosment Park, an amusement park in East Dundee, Illinois
- Santa's Village (Jefferson, New Hampshire), an amusement park
- Santa's Village (Lake Arrowhead), a tourist attraction in Lake Arrowhead, California
- Santa's Village (Scotts Valley), a former tourist attraction in Scotts Valley, California

In Finland:

- Santa Claus Village, located along the Arctic Circle, about 8 km northeast of Rovaniemi

In Canada:

- Santa's Village (Bracebridge, Ontario), a Christmas theme amusement park located on the 45th parallel north, which Bracebridge markets as Santa's "summer cottage."
