= Shoot the Rapids =

Log flume ride at Cedar Point (2010–15)

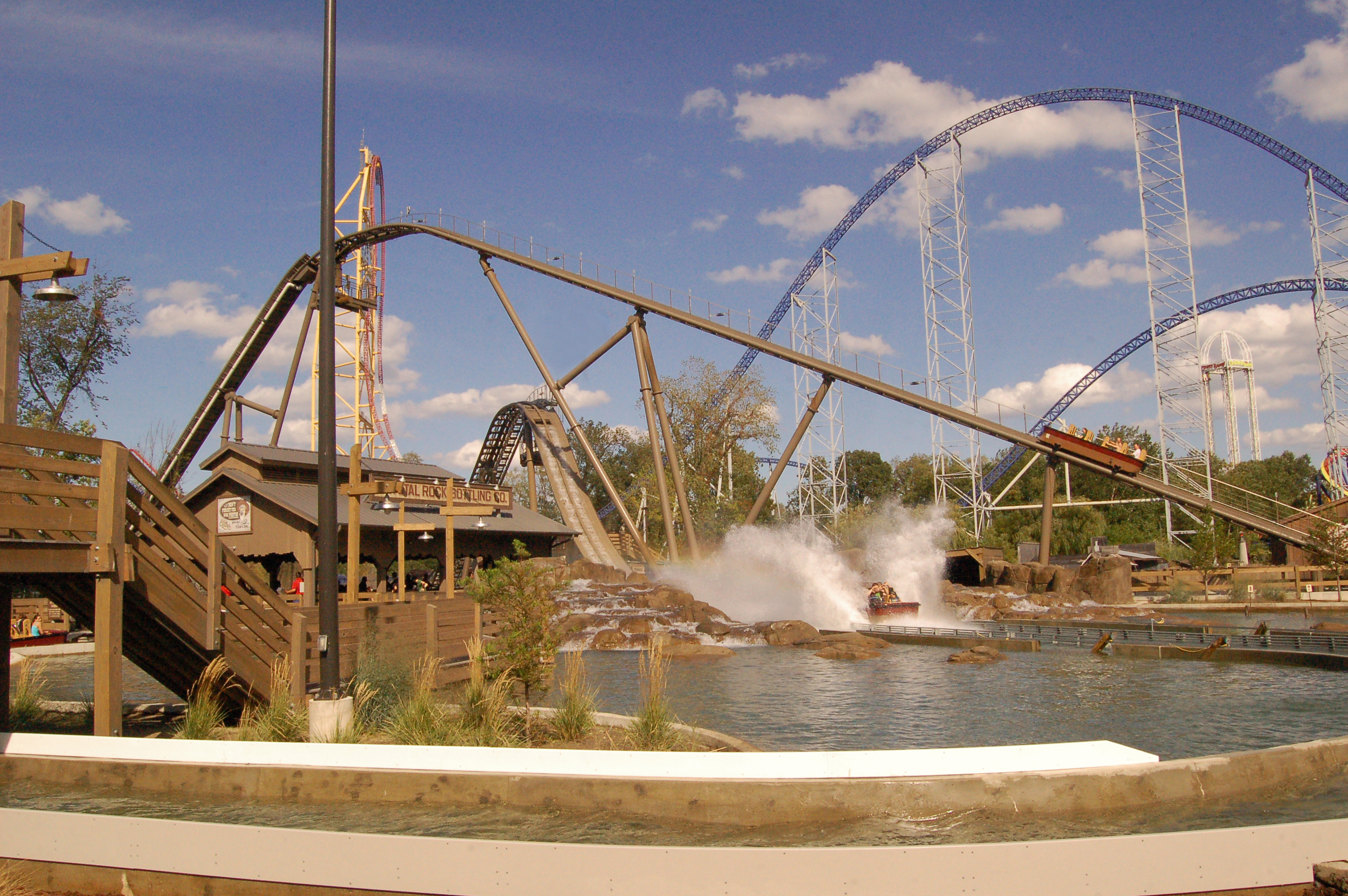
- Shoot the Rapids with Millennium Force to the right.

Cedar Point
- Area: Frontier Trail
- Coordinates: 41°28′59.64″N 82°41′21.47″W
- Status: Removed
- Cost: US$10,500,000
- Opening date: June 26, 2010
- Closing date: September 7, 2015
- Replaced by: Professor Delbert’s Frontier Fling and Forbidden Frontier on Adventure Island

General statistics
- Type: Log flume
- Manufacturer: Intamin
- Model: Shoot the Chutes
- Height: 85 ft (26 m)
- Drop: 85 ft (26 m)
- Length: 2,100 ft (640 m)
- Max vertical angle: 45°
- Capacity: 1,200 riders per hour
- Duration: 3:00
- Height restriction: 46 in (117 cm)

Shoot the Rapids was a log flume water ride located at Cedar Point in Sandusky, Ohio. The ride was built and designed by IntaRide (a subsidiary of Intamin) and opened to the public on June 26, 2010. Based on a Western theme, Shoot the Rapids featured two drops with the second one crossing under the first.

== History ==
A log flume named Shoot-the-Rapids debuted at Cedar Point in 1967. The ride closed in 1981 to make room for White Water Landing. Following weeks of dropping hints on Facebook about an upcoming new thrill ride for 2010, Cedar Point Vice President John Hildebrandt announced on September 3, 2009, that the new ride would be a log flume called Shoot the Rapids, reusing the name of the previously defunct log flume. Details confirmed that the ride would be designed and built by Intaride LLC, the North American subsidiary of Intamin, on the Millennium Island location of the park (now called Adventure Island). Shoot the Rapids opened to the public on June 26, 2010, and was Cedar Point's most expensive water ride ever built.

On February 11, 2016, less than six years later, it was reported in the Sandusky Register that construction crews began removing elements of the ride's structure leading them to believe the ride was being removed from the park. Initially, Cedar Point officials did not publicly comment on the matter. Then on February 20, 2016, during the park's annual "Winter Chill Out" off-season tour, Cedar Point confirmed the reports stating that Shoot the Rapids would not reopen in 2016 and would be removed from the park. In its spot is Professor Delbert's Frontier Fling, formerly RipCord, which had been moved to the former log flume's location due to the expansion of the waterpark area, Cedar Point Shores. Professor Delbert's Frontier Fling is named after Professor Delbert Feinstein, a character appearing on the Paddlewheel Excursions ride, which was removed when the now-defunct Dinosaurs Alive walk-through attraction was added. In 2019, the now-defunct Forbidden Frontier on Adventure Island opened on the former site of the ride, using its station building.

== Ride description ==
Shoot the Rapids was themed to a journey through a rustic western environment that took riders through an illegal moonshine business. Guests boarded flat-bottom, 10-passenger fiberglass boats that advanced through the attraction along a canal of water. The ride featured two lift hills, the first of which was 85 feet (26 m) tall featuring a 45-degree drop. The second climbed 49 feet (15 m) high and crossed under the first. Special effects included rock canyons, geysers, water features, and a dark tunnel.

== Incidents ==
On July 19, 2013, a boat carrying seven passengers rolled backward down the first lift hill and flipped over, injuring all seven riders on board; one was taken to a local hospital and later released. The ride remained closed for the rest of the season.

== See also ==
- White Water Landing, Cedar Point's previous log flume
