= Hiram D. Scott House =

- U.S. National Register of Historic Places
- Location within California
- Location: 4603 Scotts Valley Dr., Scotts Valley, California
- Coordinates: 37°02′57″N 122°01′02″W
- Area: less than one acre
- Built: 1853
- NRHP reference No.: 77000348
- Added to NRHP: April 13, 1977

The Hiram D. Scott House, at 4603 Scotts Valley Dr. in Scotts Valley, California, was built in 1853. It was listed on the National Register of Historic Places in 1977.

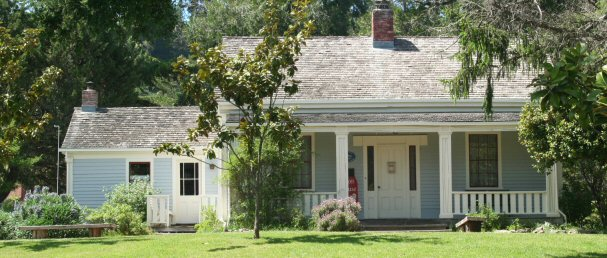
The Scott House in Scotts Valley.

Scotts Valley was named after Hiram Daniel Scott, who purchased Rancho San Agustin, including the valley, in 1850 from Joseph Ladd Majors.

Hiram Scott built the Greek revival style Scott House in 1853. Situated behind City Hall, it is a Santa Cruz County Historical Trust Landmark and is on the National Register of Historic Places. The house originally stood on Scotts Valley Drive, near where a Bank of America branch is now located.
