= Rancho San Agustin =

Mexican land grant in California

Coordinates: 37.050°N 122.030°W

Rancho San Agustin was a 4,437-acre (17.96 km^{2}) Mexican land grant in present-day Santa Cruz County, California given in 1833 by Governor José Figueroa to José Antonio Bolcoff. The grant was bounded by the San Lorenzo River on the west and Rancho Carbonera on the south, and encompassed present-day Scotts Valley.

== History ==
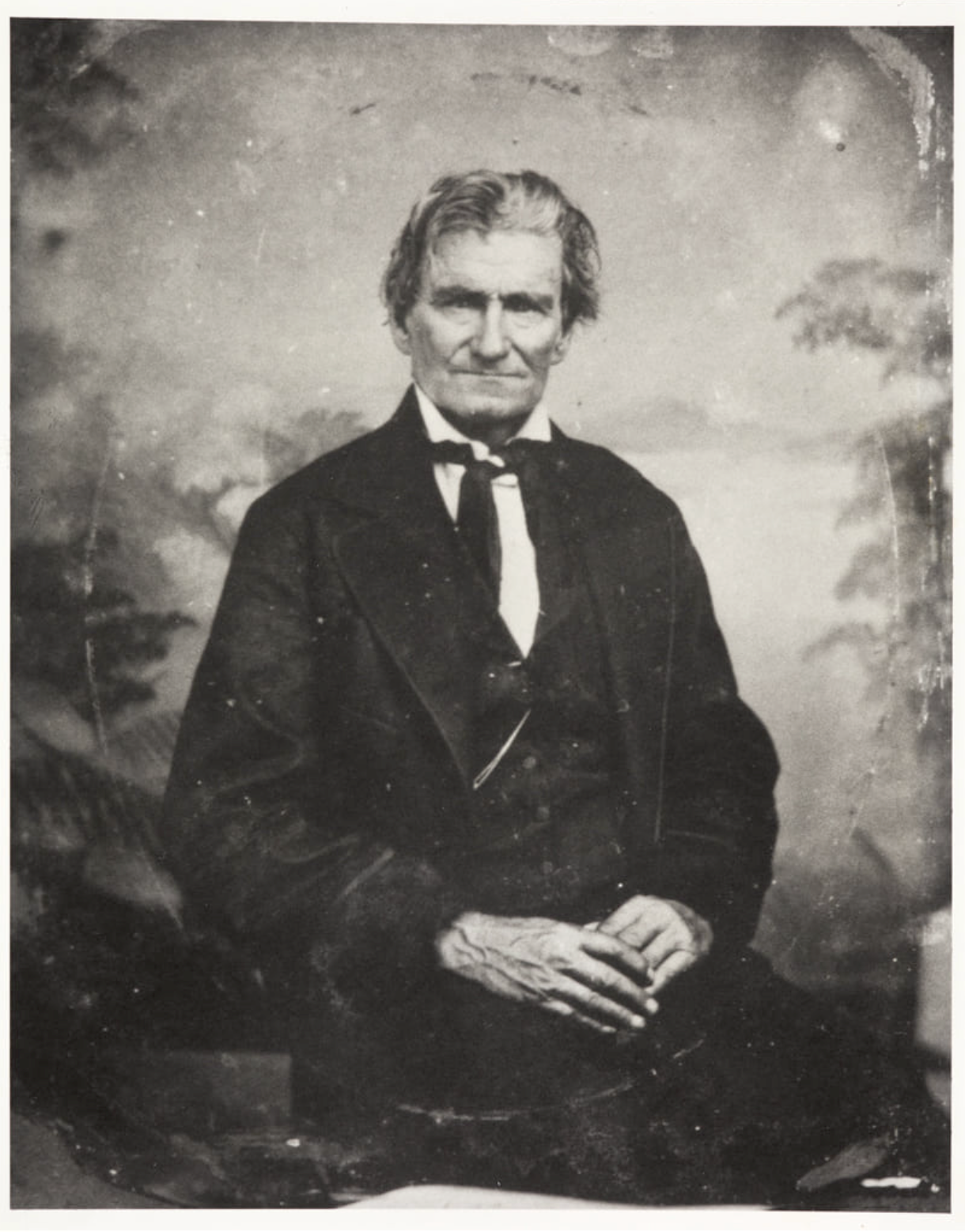
Joseph Ladd Majors (1804–1868)

José Antonio Bolcoff (1794–1866) was born Osip Volkov in Petropavlovsk-Kamchatsky, Siberia. Working for the Russian-American Company, Bolcoff was captured on shore by the Spanish in 1815. He quickly assimilated into the Spanish culture, and was given the name José Antonio Bolcof. Bolcoff traveled with Governor Pablo Vicente de Solá, acting as an interpreter. In 1822, Bolcoff settled in Branciforte and married María Candida Castro, grantee of Rancho Refugio. Bolcoff was alcade of Branciforte in 1833. In 1833, Bolcoff was granted the one square league Rancho San Augustin, and moved his family to the rancho and built an adobe. In 1839, Bolcoff replaced Francisco Soto as administrator of Mission Santa Cruz. In 1839, Bolcoff sold Rancho San Augustin to Joseph Ladd Majors.

Joseph Ladd Majors (1806–1868), a trapper from Tennessee, came to California over the Santa Fe Trail with Isaac Graham in 1834. In 1838, Majors became a naturalized Mexican citizen and was baptized as Juan José Crisostomo Mayor. In 1839, Majors married María de los Angeles Castro (1818–1903), daughter to José Joaquín Castro of Rancho San Andrés and a sister-in-law of Bolcoff. Over the next decade, Majors would use his naturalized status as the middleman for a series of land deals, obtaining land holdings in his name, and then leasing or selling the land back to his American partners. In 1841, Governor Alvarado granted Rancho San Agustin along with the abandoned Rancho Zayante to Mayor / Majors.

With the cession of California to the United States following the Mexican-American War, the 1848 Treaty of Guadalupe Hidalgo provided that the land grants would be honored. As required by the Land Act of 1851, a claim for Rancho San Agustin was filed with the Public Land Commission in 1852, and the grant was patented to Joseph Ladd Majors in 1866.

In 1852, Majors started selling Rancho San Agustin to Hiram Daniel Scott (1823–1886). Scott had come from Maine to California in 1846 as a crewman on a merchant ship, and jumped ship in Monterey. He left to try his luck as a miner during the California Gold Rush, and stayed to open a hotel in Stockton in 1850. Between 1853 and 1856, Scott brought his relatives from Maine to Rancho San Agustin. In 1856, Hiram Scott, went back to the gold mines, and his father, Captain Daniel Scott, took over the rancho. Scott sold 1,115 acres (4.5 km^{2}) to Joseph and Grace Errington in 1865. The Erringtons established the first dairy in Scotts Valley.

== Historic sites of the Rancho ==
- Hiram D. Scott House Built by Hiram Daniel Scott in 1853.
