= Old Chicago =

Shopping mall and indoor amusement park in Illinois

- Logo
- Interactive map of Old Chicago
- Location: 555 S Bolingbrook Dr, Bolingbrook, Illinois, United States
- Coordinates: 41°40′45″N 88°4′16″W
- Status: Defunct
- Opened: June 17, 1975
- Closed: March 17, 1980 (amusement park); August 1981 (shopping mall) (demolished spring 1986)
- Owner: Robert Brindle
- Theme: Turn-of-the-century

Old Chicago was a combination shopping mall and indoor amusement park that existed in the southwest Chicago suburb of Bolingbrook, Illinois, from 1975 until 1980. It was billed as "The world's first indoor amusement park", and it was intended to draw visitors all year round, rain or shine. It opened to great fanfare and over 15,000 visitors on June 17, 1975, with an enormous building that housed major rides, such as three roller coasters and a Ferris wheel, as well as a turn-of-the-century-themed shopping mall with design reminiscent of the architecture of Louis Sullivan, such as his work for the 1893 World's Columbian Exposition in Chicago. However, only six months after opening, the complex ran into financial troubles due to construction cost overruns. The opening of a competing amusement park in Chicago's north suburbs (known today as Six Flags Great America) hurt attendance, and the lack of large anchor stores failed to draw enough local and repeat shoppers. Despite management changes, the center continued to lose money. By 1978, the mall began closing on Mondays and Tuesdays, and in early 1980 the entire amusement park shut down and the rides were sold, only five years after opening. Efforts to find alternative uses for the huge building failed, and the structure was demolished in the spring of 1986.

== History ==
Designer Robert Brindle conceived of the idea behind Old Chicago after a visit to Knott's Berry Farm amusement park in Buena Park, California, and wished to put an entire park - complete with roller coaster, Ferris wheel, and log flumes - indoors so that it could be open year-round. Brindle's concept featured an early 20th-century decor inside, with the mall featuring smaller local shops and boutiques rather than the traditional department stores that anchored most malls.One of the more successful stores was the custom t-shirt shop run by Larry Zabo.

Over two years in the making, Old Chicago was opened to the public on June 17, 1975, in a grand opening party that attracted over 10,000 invited guests, causing massive traffic jams. The Old Chicago TV commercial featured an 18-year-old Michelle Mauthe tap-dancing on top of the dome during high winds, while a cameraman filmed from inside a helicopter.

Construction on the mall was not yet complete and much of the electrical wiring was still exposed. When local officials saw the situation, the mall owners were told that they would not be able to open June 26 as scheduled. Construction crews worked around the clock to complete the project, and after a last-minute inspection, the mall opened on time to another crowd of over 15,000. In the mall's first months of operation, it received over 50,000 visitors each weekend.

Soon, problems began developing with the mall's hurried construction. As early as July 1975, a malfunction in the mall's sprinkler system caused a six-hour shutdown of the mall. Later that year, a small fire in a trash compactor forced an evacuation of the mall. In November, acrobat Jimmy Troy fell to his death from the trapeze during a circus at the mall.

Only six months after opening, the mall was on the verge of bankruptcy due to millions of dollars in overruns in construction. Brindle was removed as general manager, and Illinois Central Railroad (an investor in the project) installed Clyde Farman.

The outdoor Marriott's Great America theme park (today known as Six Flags Great America) opened in 1976, drawing visitors away from Old Chicago. Unusual stores, boutiques, and a lack of recognizable anchor stores proved to be another of Old Chicago's undoings; the mall was not very successful in attracting local residents week after week because of a lack of stores where they wanted to shop. Late in 1976, as attendance declined, stores in the mall began closing down.

== Closing ==
Illinois Central took full control of the mall's logistics in early 1977, rescheduling the hours of operation and spending over $8 million adding new attractions. A series of management changes occurred, but the shops continued closing one by one.

By 1978, Old Chicago began closing on Mondays and Tuesdays. More fires struck during 1979: The Old Chicago Tobacco Company caught fire when a tobacco dryer malfunctioned. There were no sprinklers in the area where the fire started. A Fourth of July fireworks display also ignited prematurely, causing minor injuries to two people. Director Brian De Palma filmed scenes from his 1978 supernatural thriller film The Fury at Old Chicago.

Finally, in March 1980, the entire amusement park shut down and the rides were sold. The last remaining stores left soon afterward, as management pitched the idea of recreating the mall as a discount outlet. The plan didn't attract investors and the mall closed in August 1981. A group of investors purchased the enormous building shortly afterward with plans to convert it into a casino. The village of Bolingbrook nixed the idea and the building was put up for auction in 1982. Illinois Central expressed their desire to demolish the structure, but the village, in the hopes of finding a buyer, changed its zoning laws to prevent the destruction. While Bolingbrook sought a new buyer for the building, structural damage from roof leaks began damaging the vacant building. In addition, vandals repeatedly broke into the building, causing more damage.

In 1985, the building was finally sold to investment banker C.L. Carr, who initially pledged to keep the building open as an entertainment complex, but later attempted to sell parcels of the land beneath it. Last-ditch efforts to salvage the enormous building—as an international trade center for the People's Republic of China, as a venue for the cancelled 1992 World's Fair, even as a Major League Baseball stadium for the Chicago White Sox—all failed, and the building was demolished in the spring of 1986.

On January 21, 2020, Amazon paid $50.5 million for the former Old Chicago mega mall site.

== Legacy ==
The concept of an amusement park inside a mall emerged years later at two famous malls—West Edmonton Mall in Edmonton, Alberta, Canada (Galaxyland), and Mall of America in Bloomington, Minnesota (Nickelodeon Universe).

The now-expanded street where Old Chicago once stood is still named for the mall. Arena Auto Auction's address is 200 Old Chicago Drive.

The Chicago Loop roller coaster that stood inside the mall's amusement park was renamed the Canobie Corkscrew and operated at Canobie Lake Park from 1987 until 2021. It was among the first four in the world to turn riders upside down twice, along with Corkscrew at Knott's Berry Farm, Wabash Cannonball at Opryland USA, and Corkscrew at Magic Harbor, all four opening in 1975.

== See also ==
- List of defunct amusement parks
- Six Flags Autoworld (another indoor park that flopped)
- Knott's Berry Farm (the park that inspired Old Chicago)
