= Santa's Village (Scotts Valley) =

Former American amusement park

- Interactive map of Santa's Village
- Location: Scotts Valley, California; United States
- Coordinates: 37.065433°N 121.997401°W
- Status: Defunct
- Opened: May 30, 1957
- Closed: 1979
- Theme: Christmas

Santa's Village was a Christmas-themed amusement park from 1957 to 1979, located in Scotts Valley, California, United States.

== History and attractions ==
In 1956 the Lawridge dairy farm, alongside Highway 17 in Scotts Valley, was leased to southern California developer Glenn Holland. He had already developed Santa's Village (Lake Arrowhead) in 1955, in San Bernardino County, and would later build a third in East Dundee, Illinois, becoming Santa's Village AZoosment Park.

The grand opening was May 30, 1957, with Danish native Carl Hansen in the role of Santa Claus and Alma Ragon as Mrs. Claus. Carl Hansen went on to star in KNTV television's Hocus Pocus The Clown and Magician. The main rides were a bobsled, a spinning Christmas tree and Santa's Express train. There was also a petting zoo, a huge Jack-in-the-Box and equally large Santa's boot, and an Alice in Wonderland hall of mirrors. There was also a frozen North Pole. All the workers dressed like elves.

In August 1966, Holland sold to developer Noorudin Billawala. In 1977, the Santa's Village Corporation filed for bankruptcy, and in 1979 the park closed for good. In 1990 Borland International purchased the land as their world headquarters. The park had its own freeway exit off Highway 17, and as of 2026, the freeway exit signs still read "Santa's Village Road".
