= Scotts Valley, California =

City in California, United States

City of Scotts Valley
- City
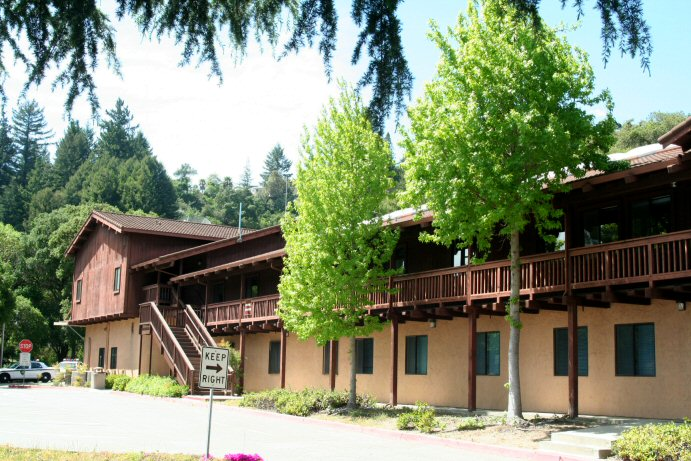
- Back view of the Scotts Valley Civic Center/City Hall and Police Department

- Flag Seal
- Interactive map of City of Scotts Valley
- Location in the United States
- Coordinates: 37°3′5″N 122°0′48″W
- Country: United States
- State: California
- County: Santa Cruz
- Incorporated: August 2, 1966

Area
  - Total: 4.62 sq mi (11.96 km^{2})
  - Land: 4.62 sq mi (11.96 km^{2})
  - Water: 0 sq mi (0.00 km^{2}) 0%
- Elevation: 561 ft (171 m)

Population (2020)
  - Total: 12,224
  - Density: 2,664/sq mi (1,028.7/km^{2})
- Time zone: UTC−8 (PST)
  - Summer (DST): UTC−7 (PDT)
- ZIP codes: 95060, 95066, 95067
- Area code: 831
- FIPS code: 06-70588
- GNIS feature ID: 0277598
- Website: scottsvalley.gov

Scotts Valley is a small city in Santa Cruz County, California, United States, about thirty miles (48 km) south of downtown San Jose and six miles (9.7 km) north of the city of Santa Cruz, in the upland slope of the Santa Cruz Mountains. As of the 2020 census, the city population was 12,224. Principal access to the city is supplied by State Route 17 that connects San Jose and Santa Cruz. The city was incorporated in 1966.

== History ==
Approximately ten thousand years ago there was a lake in the lowest elevation of Scotts Valley. Archeological excavations of site CA-SCR-177 (Scotts Valley Site) in 1983 and 1987 support dates for human settlement of this area as between 9,000 and 12,000 years before present (YBP). The lake drained during the Mid-Holocene warming period (4,000-5,000 YBP) forming what is now known as Carbonera Creek. When the lake drained, the people moved downslope following the lake water's transformation as in became the creek. Around 2000 BC, Ohlone people occupied areas along the remaining creeks, spring and seep areas, along with permanent and seasonal drainages, and on flat ridges and terraces. Permanent villages were usually placed on elevations above seasonal flood levels. Surrounding areas were used for hunting and seed, acorn, and grass gathering. Therefore, areas along watercourses are considered likely locations for prehistoric cultural resources. Several watercourses, including portions of Carbonera Creek, Bean Creek, and MacKenzie Creek, are within the city.

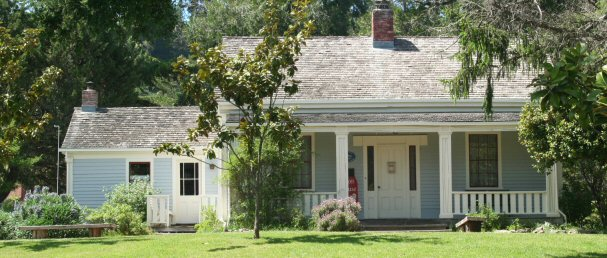
The Scott House in Scotts Valley

Scotts Valley was named after Hiram Daniel Scott, who purchased Rancho San Agustin, including the valley, in 1850 from Joseph Ladd Majors. Before Majors, the property was owned by José Bolcoff. Bolcoff was the original settler and first European to claim title and live in what was to be Scotts Valley. He was born Osip Volkov around 1794 in Petropavlovsk-Kamchatsky, Siberia. Working as a fur trader around 1815, Bolcoff jumped ship on the Monterey Bay shoreline, quickly assimilated into the Spanish culture, and was well received by the Spanish authorities. Volkov had his Russian Orthodox baptism validated in Mission Soledad in 1817, and was given the Spanish name José Antonio Bolcoff. Bolcoff lived with and traveled with Alta California's governor Pablo Vicente de Solá, acting as an interpreter.

Becoming a Mexican citizen in 1833, Bolcoff moved his family to his 4,400-acre (18 km^{2}) land grant building, an adobe casa historians speculate was located near present-day Kings Village Shopping Center. Bolcoff relinquished his interest in the Rancho San Augustin, selling and accepting $400 from Joseph Ladd Majors, also known as Don Juan José Mechacas. July 7, 1846, marked the shift of power in the region from Mexico to the United States.

Hiram Scott built the Greek revival style Scott House in 1853. Situated behind City Hall, it is a Santa Cruz County Historical Trust Landmark and is on the National Register of Historic Places. The house originally stood on Scotts Valley Drive, near where a Bank of America branch is now located.

From the 1840s, money-making activity in Scotts Valley centered on several industries: lumber, grain, the milling of grain, and most importantly the tanning of hides and working of leather. Beginning in the 1930s, peat moss was removed from Scotts Valley and taken to San Francisco to supply soil for difficult indoor plants such as gardenias. When the peat ran out, sand and gravel were quarried and sold.

The area was the site of Santa's Village, a Christmas-themed amusement park which opened on May 30, 1957, on a 25-acre (10 ha) site which was formerly Lawridge Farm, part of the former Rancho San Augustin. "Residents" of the park included Santa, Mrs. Santa, and elves and gnomes who operated the rides and sold tickets. There was a petting zoo, a bobsled ride, a whirling Christmas tree ride, and a train ride, as well as a Fairy Tale Land. The park was sold in 1966 but continued to be operated under lease by the Santa's Village Corporation. When that corporation went bankrupt in 1977. the owner considered launching a Knott's Berry Farm type of complex but was denied a permit by the city of Scotts Valley, and the park closed for good in 1979.

Scotts Valley's most famous resident was film director Alfred Hitchcock, who lived in a mountaintop estate above the Vine Hill area from 1940 to 1972. Florence Owens Thompson, depicted in Dorothea Lange's Migrant Mother photograph, died in Scotts Valley in 1983.

Netflix was founded in Scotts Valley by Reed Hastings and Marc Randolph in 1997.

In December 2024, Scotts Valley was impacted by an EF1 tornado. Five people were injured.

== Economy ==
=== Tourism ===
From its early years as a stop on the stage route across the mountains, the Scotts Valley area has provided services to travelers. With the growing usage of the automobile in the early 20th century, the area became commercialized and tourism developed as a local industry.

In the early 1920s, Edward Evers established Camp Evers at the junction of the State Highway and Mt. Hermon Road. Camp Evers consisted of a small store, gas pumps, dance hall and tents, becoming a resort and rest stop for travelers.

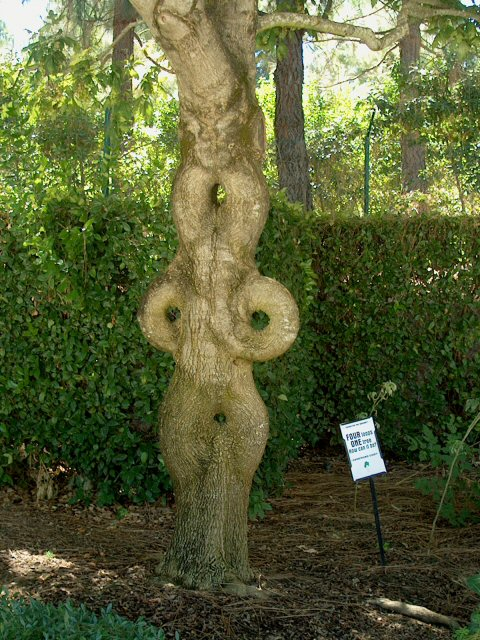
A "Circus Tree" now located at Gilroy Gardens near Gilroy, California

The Beverly Gardens were established in the 1930s and featured a collection of exotic birds and animals, a restaurant, and cabins.

Axel Erlandson opened The Tree Circus in 1947, featuring trees grafted and trained in strange and unusual shapes. Bright "life size" painted dinosaurs overlooking Highway 17 were added to the Tree Circus in 1964 when it changed its name to The Lost World. Surviving trees have since been moved to Gilroy Gardens.

Santa's Village, one of three locations in America's first theme park chain, was established in 1956. It was the most popular of the many attractions, attracting millions of visitors to Scotts Valley for over twenty years, and it was the last of Scotts Valley's theme parks to close its doors, in 1979. H. Glenn Holland, who had already developed a Santa's Village elsewhere the previous year, leased 25 acres (100,000 m^{2}) at the former Lawridge Farm, which was a portion of the former Rancho San Augustin for the Scotts Valley location of Santa's Village. The park maintained a historically correct team of Mexican burros that lived on the back 20-acre (81,000 m^{2}) field. Four reindeer from Unalakleet, Alaska, pulled Santa's sleigh. All the buildings were designed to look like log chalet-type structures, replete with snowy roofs and gingerbread trim. One chalet housed a legendary fresh gingerbread bakery. Theme-appropriate music flowed from speakers hidden in towering redwood trees. In 1977 the Santa's Village Corporation had filed for bankruptcy, and in 1979 the park's gates were finally closed. The site, for years a playing field at the former headquarters of Borland, now contains houses and townhomes.

Scotts Valley is also near Big Basin Redwoods State Park, Henry Cowell Redwoods State Park, and Roaring Camp Railroads. The town is surrounded by coast redwood forests. The city of Santa Cruz lies to the south. A relatively large municipal skateboard park, where pro skateboarder Eric Costello died in October 2005 due to improper helmet use, is near Skypark, the site of a former airport, in central Scotts Valley.

Three hotels operate in Scotts Valley: a Best Western hotel located near the Granite Creek entrance to Highway 17, a Four Points by Sheraton located on Scotts Valley Drive, and a Hilton hotel located near the Mount Hermon junction with Highway 17.

=== Redevelopment and high technology ===
Evidence regarding blighted conditions in the Redevelopment Area of Santa's Village and the Skypark Airport was established in the year 1990.

E-mu Systems, Seagate Technology, Sessions, and Borland Software Corporation were all formerly headquartered in Scotts Valley.

Zero Motorcycles manufactures all-electric motorcycles in Scotts Valley.

Netflix's first headquarters were established in Scotts Valley by Reed Hastings, a Stanford graduate, in 1997. The headquarters were later moved to nearby Los Gatos, California.

In May 2016, the University of California, Santa Cruz signed a 20-year lease to occupy the former Borland headquarters establishing its Scotts Valley Center. The center serves as the professional offices for three of its divisions — Information Technology services, Business and Administrative services, and University Relations.

=== Top employers ===
According to Scotts Valley's 2023 annual comprehensive financial report, the top employers in the city are:

#	Employer	# of Employees
1	Threshold Enterprises	347
2	Central California Alliance for Health	309
3	Bay Photo Lab	279
4	Zero Motorcycles	227
5	Fox Factory	165
6	1440 Multiversity	115
7	Bell Sports, Inc	104
8	Permanente Medical Group	95
9	The Camp	91
10	Digital Dynamics	76

== Demographics ==
Historical population
Census	Pop.	Note	%±
1970	3,621		—
1980	6,891		90.3%
1990	8,615		25.0%
2000	11,385		32.2%
2010	11,580		1.7%
2020	12,224		5.6%
U.S. Decennial Census

=== 2020 census ===
As of the 2020 census, Scotts Valley had a population of 12,224. The population density was 2,647.0 inhabitants per square mile (1,022.0/km^{2}). The median age was 44.5 years. 22.2% of residents were under the age of 18, 7.0% were aged 18 to 24, 21.5% were aged 25 to 44, 30.1% were aged 45 to 64, and 19.2% were 65 years of age or older. For every 100 females, there were 93.3 males, and for every 100 females age 18 and over, there were 90.6 males age 18 and over.

The census reported that 98.6% of the population lived in households, 1.2% lived in non-institutionalized group quarters, and 0.1% were institutionalized.

100.0% of residents lived in urban areas, while 0.0% lived in rural areas.

There were 4,690 households in Scotts Valley, of which 34.6% had children under the age of 18 living in them. Of all households, 55.4% were married-couple households, 6.0% were cohabiting couple households, 13.5% were households with a male householder and no spouse or partner present, and 25.2% were households with a female householder and no spouse or partner present. About 22.9% of all households were made up of individuals and 14.1% had someone living alone who was 65 years of age or older. The average household size was 2.57. There were 3,287 families (70.1% of all households).

There were 4,934 housing units at an average density of 1,068.4 units per square mile (412.5 units/km^{2}), of which 4,690 (95.1%) were occupied. Of occupied units, 74.1% were owner-occupied and 25.9% were occupied by renters. The homeowner vacancy rate was 1.6% and the rental vacancy rate was 5.7%.

Racial composition as of the 2020 census
Race	Number	Percent
White	9,204	75.3%
Black or African American	85	0.7%
American Indian and Alaska Native	75	0.6%
Asian	836	6.8%
Native Hawaiian and Other Pacific Islander	16	0.1%
Some other race	578	4.7%
Two or more races	1,430	11.7%
Hispanic or Latino (of any race)	1,559	12.8%

=== 2023 ACS estimates ===
In 2023, the US Census Bureau estimated that the median household income was $140,887, and the per capita income was $79,348. About 0.7% of families and 4.8% of the population were below the poverty line.

=== 2010 census ===
The 2010 United States census reported that Scotts Valley had a population of 11,580. The population density was 2,520.4 inhabitants per square mile (973.1/km^{2}). The racial makeup of Scotts Valley was 9,958 (86.0%) White, 101 (0.9%) African American, 57 (0.5%) Native American, 590 (5.1%) Asian, 18 (0.2%) Pacific Islander, 292 (2.5%) from other races, and 564 (4.9%) from two or more races. Hispanic or Latino of any race were 1,158 persons (10.0%).

The Census reported that 11,308 people (97.7% of the population) lived in households, 264 (2.3%) lived in non-institutionalized group quarters, and 8 (0.1%) were institutionalized.

There were 4,426 households, out of which 1,588 (35.9%) had children under the age of 18 living in them, 2,423 (54.7%) were opposite-sex married couples living together, 474 (10.7%) had a female householder with no husband present, 189 (4.3%) had a male householder with no wife present. There were 206 (4.7%) unmarried opposite-sex partnerships, and 43 (1.0%) same-sex married couples or partnerships. 1,054 households (23.8%) were made up of individuals, and 516 (11.7%) had someone living alone who was 65 years of age or older. The average household size was 2.55. There were 3,086 families (69.7% of all households); the average family size was 3.03.

The population was spread out, with 2,863 people (24.7%) under the age of 18, 969 people (8.4%) aged 18 to 24, 2,513 people (21.7%) aged 25 to 44, 3,660 people (31.6%) aged 45 to 64, and 1,575 people (13.6%) who were 65 years of age or older. The median age was 41.7 years. For every 100 females, there were 95.1 males. For every 100 females age 18 and over, there were 91.0 males.

There were 4,610 housing units at an average density of 1,003.4 units per square mile (387.4 units/km^{2}), of which 3,248 (73.4%) were owner-occupied, and 1,178 (26.6%) were occupied by renters. The homeowner vacancy rate was 1.4%; the rental vacancy rate was 3.2%. 8,558 people (73.9% of the population) lived in owner-occupied housing units and 2,750 people (23.7%) lived in rental housing units.

== Government ==
In the state legislature, Scotts Valley is in the 17th Senate District, represented by Democrat John Laird, and in the 28th Assembly District, represented by Democrat Gail Pellerin.

Federally, Scotts Valley is in California's 19th congressional district, represented by Democrat Jimmy Panetta.

== Education ==
From 1950 to 2011, Scotts Valley was home to Bethany University, a four-year private Christian university. The campus was leased to Olivet University for the 2011–2012 school year, but Olivet was unable to complete a purchase and moved back to San Francisco in May 2012. The parent Assemblies of God denomination is seeking another buyer for the campus.

The Scotts Valley Unified School District operates four public schools: Scotts Valley High School (grades 9 to 12), Scotts Valley Middle School (grades 6 to 8), and two elementary schools: Vine Hill School (grades Kindergarten to 5) and Brook Knoll School. They also operate an Independent Study/Home School program. Together these schools serve more than 2,600 students each year.

Baymonte Christian School serves students from pre-Kindergarten through eighth grades. Baymonte is a non-denominational Protestant Bible school that was founded in 1968. In 2003, it earned the distinction of being a Blue Ribbon School, a distinction awarded to one school in 25 across the nation.

Monterey Coast Preparatory School, a private school offering a college preparatory curriculum for middle and high schoolers with learning differences, moved from its original location in Santa Cruz to Scotts Valley in 2014.

== Former venues ==
=== The Barn ===
In the fall of 1965, Eric Nord, proprietor of coffee houses including the Hungry I in San Francisco, and the Sticky Wicket in Aptos, also opened The Barn (1965–1968), an art gallery and coffee house, with a large area for concerts, on the site of the Frapwell Dairy Barn (1914–1948), in Scotts Valley. Janis Joplin and the Grateful Dead performed at The Barn. Tom Wolfe describes the Merry Pranksters and Ken Kesey, from La Honda, at The Barn, in the last chapter of The Electric Kool-Aid Acid Test. At Scott's Valley Drive, just off Highway 17, The Barn as a nightclub closed by 1968, with the Baymonte Christian School taking control of the property. The Barn resurrected as a dinner theater in an RV park in the 70s, and eventually a warehouse for Seagate Technologies. The Barn was torn down in 1991.

=== Santa's Village ===
Unrelated to the prior Santa's Village (Jefferson, New Hampshire) (1953—), Santa's Village (Scotts Valley) (1957–1979) was an amusement park, built after Santa's Village (Lake Arrowhead) (1955–1998, 2016–present), San Bernardino County.

== Geography and environment ==
Scotts Valley is in the west hills of the Santa Cruz Mountains. State Route 17 connects Scotts Valley to Santa Cruz to the south and to Los Gatos, San Jose, and the South Bay area to the north.

Scotts Valley is located at the southern end of the WWF-designated Northern California coastal forests ecoregion.

According to the United States Census Bureau, it has a total area of 4.6 square miles (12 km^{2}), all land. It is in central Santa Cruz County, in the northern portion of the North Central Coast Air Basin.

=== Climate ===
Air in Scotts Valley is typically maritime in origin, as it moves over the land from the Pacific Ocean. Summers are warm and dry, while winters are mild and generally rainy. Most rain falls as a result of winter Pacific storms between the months of November and April. Sound levels in Scotts Valley are typically in the range of 57 to 65 dBA, except for somewhat higher levels within 150 feet (46 m) from Highway 17.

Scotts Valley has mild weather throughout the year, enjoying a Mediterranean climate (Köppen Csb) characterized by cool, wet winters and warm, mostly dry summers. Due to its proximity to Monterey Bay, fog and low overcast are common during the night and morning hours, especially in the summer.

Climate data for Scotts Valley, California (1981–2010 normals)
Month	Jan	Feb	Mar	Apr	May	Jun	Jul	Aug	Sep	Oct	Nov	Dec	Year
Mean daily maximum °F (°C)	60.6 (15.9)	62.3 (16.8)	64.4 (18.0)	67.5 (19.7)	70.1 (21.2)	72.9 (22.7)	73.4 (23.0)	74.3 (23.5)	74.5 (23.6)	71.5 (21.9)	64.9 (18.3)	60.0 (15.6)	68.0 (20.0)
Mean daily minimum °F (°C)	40.8 (4.9)	42.7 (5.9)	44.0 (6.7)	45.5 (7.5)	48.6 (9.2)	51.5 (10.8)	53.7 (12.1)	53.9 (12.2)	52.6 (11.4)	49.0 (9.4)	44.3 (6.8)	40.8 (4.9)	47.3 (8.5)
Average precipitation inches (mm)	6.40 (163)	6.24 (158)	4.67 (119)	1.99 (51)	0.85 (22)	0.19 (4.8)	0.01 (0.25)	0.04 (1.0)	0.27 (6.9)	1.44 (37)	3.75 (95)	5.68 (144)	31.53 (801)
Average precipitation days (≥ 0.01 in)	10.6	10.9	10.0	5.9	3.3	1.3	0.3	0.7	1.5	3.5	7.5	10.7	66.2
Source: NOAA

== Infrastructure ==
Drinking water is supplied to the City of Scotts Valley by the Scotts Valley Water District and the San Lorenzo Valley Water District. Domestic water supplies are obtained solely from groundwater sources extracted by wells. Wastewater in Scotts Valley is treated at the Scotts Valley Wastewater Treatment Plant at Scotts Valley and Mount Hermon Roads. Treated wastewater effluent is pumped via the city of Santa Cruz into the Pacific Ocean.

Bus service from Scotts Valley to Santa Cruz, California; the San Lorenzo Valley; and San Jose, California; is provided by the Santa Cruz Metropolitan Transit District.

The Santa Cruz Sky Park, a small recreational airport, closed in 1983.

== Sister cities ==
- Nichinan, Japan
