= Lightning Bolt (roller coaster) =

Steel roller coaster

MGM Grand Adventures Theme Park
- Location: MGM Grand Adventures Theme Park
- Coordinates: 36.107391°N 115.166690°W
- Status: Removed
- Opening date: 1993
- Closing date: September 4, 2000

General statistics
- Type: – Steel
- Manufacturer: Intamin
- Designer: Ing.-Büro Stengel GmbH
- Model: Family roller coaster
- Lift/launch system: 2 lift hills
- Height: 69.0 ft (21.0 m)
- Drop: 60 ft (18 m)
- Length: 2,400 ft (730 m)
- Speed: 35 mph (56 km/h)
- Inversions: 0
- Trains: 2 trains with 10 cars. Riders are arranged 2 across in a single row for a total of 20 riders per train.
- Lightning Bolt at RCDB

Lightning Bolt was a steel family roller coaster that operated at MGM Grand Adventures Theme Park in Paradise, Nevada, United States, until the park's closure in 2000. Manufactured by Intamin, the ride opened at the park in 1993 as an indoor roller coaster before being renovated in 1997 and expanded outdoors.

== History ==
In 1993, Lightning Bolt first opened during the grand opening of MGM Grand Adventures Theme Park. The ride was classified as an indoor roller coaster, as it never traveled outside. In 1997, the ride was relocated to a different location in the park before being renovated and expanded outdoors. This renovation added a second lift hill and extended the length of the roller coaster from 1,100 feet (340 m) to 2,400 feet (730 m).

In September 2002, it was announced that MGM Grand Adventures Theme Park, along with its rides, would be closed to make space for condos and a swimming pool. Lightning Bolt was taken down piece by piece as it would be attempted to be relocated to Granite Park in Fresno, California before that theme park closed as well. The roller coaster remained in storage before being scrapped.
