= Maverick (roller coaster) =

Launched roller coaster at Cedar Point

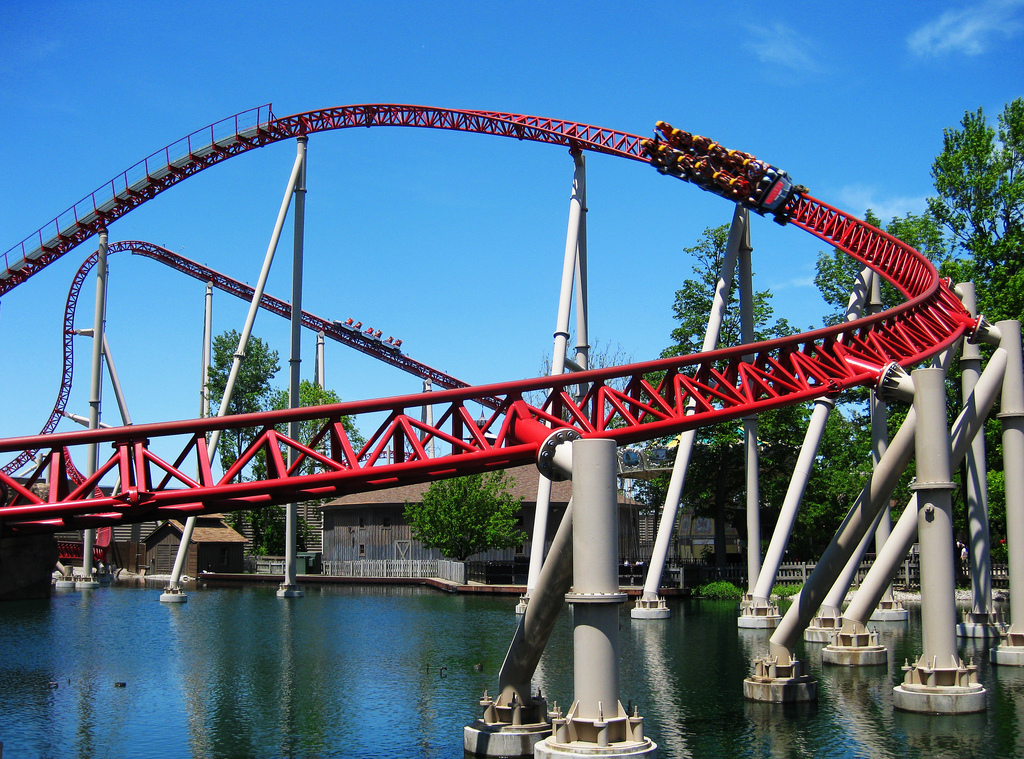
- Maverick's 105-foot, 95 degree drop and turnaround in the former Swan Boat pond

Cedar Point
- Location: Cedar Point
- Park section: Frontier Town
- Coordinates: 41°29′6.73″N 82°41′33.13″W
- Status: Operating
- Opening date: May 26, 2007
- Cost: US$21,000,000
- Replaced: White Water Landing; Swan Boats

General statistics
- Type: Steel – Launched
- Manufacturer: Intamin
- Designer: Werner Stengel
- Model: LSM Launch Coaster
- Lift/launch system: Two LSM launches 1st launch: Launched lift hill 2nd launch: 0 to 70 mph (0 to 113 km/h) in 3 seconds
- Height: 105 ft (32 m)
- Drop: 100 ft (30 m)
- Length: 4,450 ft (1,360 m)
- Speed: 70 mph (110 km/h)
- Inversions: 2
- Duration: 2:30
- Max vertical angle: 95°
- Capacity: 1,200 riders per hour
- Height restriction: 52–78 in (132–198 cm)
- Trains: 6 trains with 3 cars; riders arranged 2 across in 2 rows for a total of 12 riders per train
- Fast Lane Plus only available
- Maverick at RCDB

Maverick is a steel roller coaster located at Cedar Point in Sandusky, Ohio. Manufactured by Intamin at a cost of $21 million, it was the 500th roller coaster designed by German engineer Werner Stengel and the first to feature a twisted horseshoe roll element. There are two launch points along the 4,450-foot (1,360 m) track that utilize linear synchronous motors (LSM). Maverick features a beyond-vertical drop of 95 degrees and reaches a maximum speed of 70 mph (110 km/h).

Maverick was originally scheduled to open on May 12, 2007, but the opening was delayed after testing revealed that its heartline roll element, which followed the second launch, would exert excessive force on riders. It was replaced in favor of an s-curve element that joins two banked turns, and the coaster opened to public on May 26, 2007. The slogan used in the ride's promotion was "The Old West Was Never This Wild".

== History ==
Maverick sits on the former site of White Water Landing. After White Water Landing closed on October 30, 2005, construction on Maverick began. On January 24, 2006, Cedar Fair Entertainment Company filed a trademark for the name Maverick. The project became known officially and colloquially as "Project 2007" until the announcement on September 7, 2006.

=== Construction ===
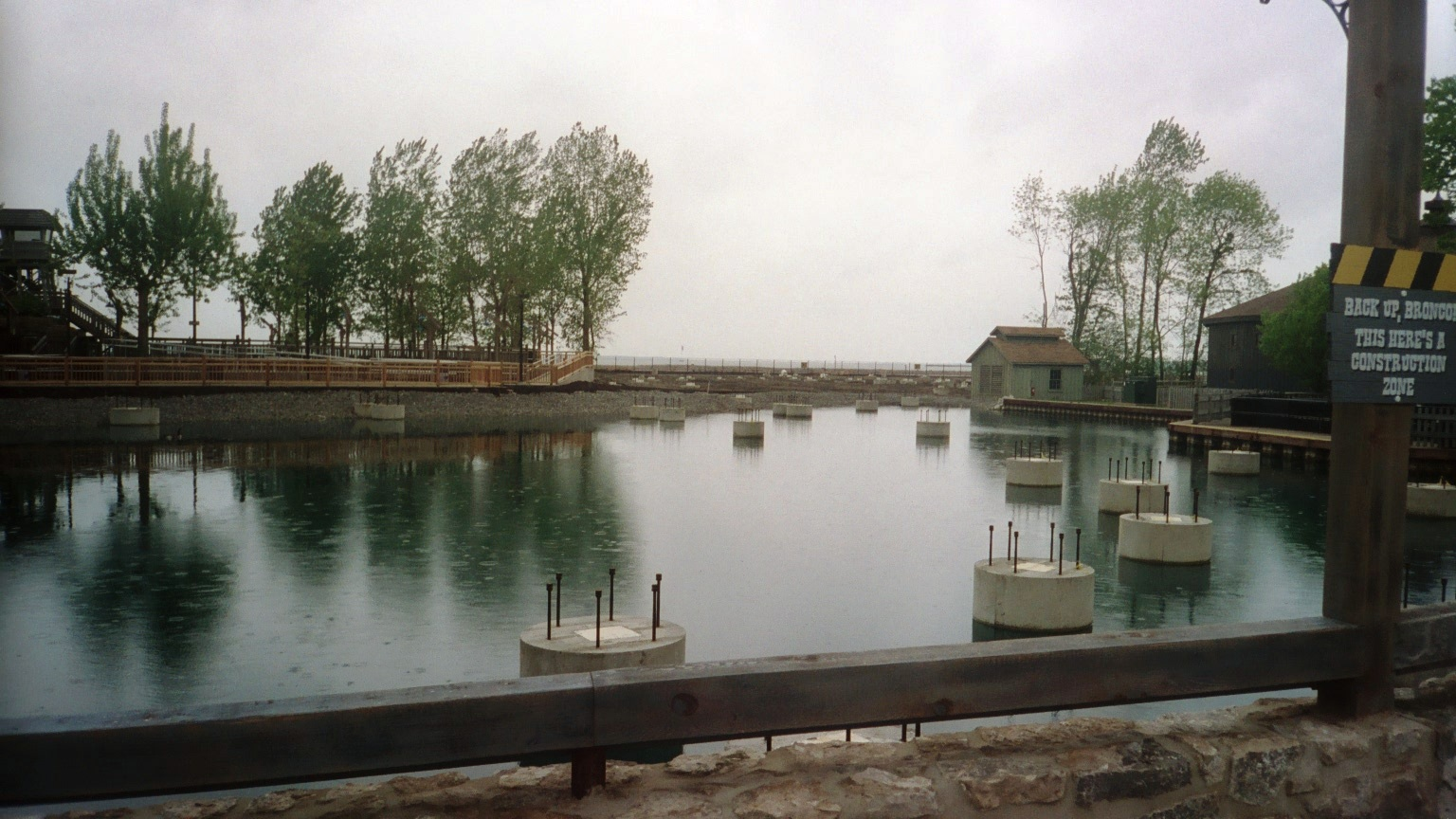
Maverick's footings dot the former Swan Boat pond. Photo taken May 13, 2006

After the closure of the 2005 season in October, the White Water Landing log flume ride was retired. Although the ride was disassembled, the station was left intact and now serves as Maverick's on-ride photo booth and queue. Beginning in February 2006, concrete footers were poured on the former White Water Landing site, as well as in the pond that once housed Cedar Point's Swan Boat ride. In May 2006, track segments arrived in a fenced area near the park's off-site hotel, formerly named Breakers Express (renamed Express Hotel). Initially, Cedar Point covered track segments with blue tarps. On July 16, 2006, the first steel supports were erected. On the week of August 16, 2006, the first track segments were installed. On September 11, 2006, the crest of the lift hill was added, thereby topping off the ride. Track installation was completed on October 28, 2006 and the first phase of testing began in January 2007.

=== Delayed opening ===
On May 8, 2007, four days before Maverick was scheduled to debut, park general manager John Hildebrant announced that the ride would be delayed until early June because three 40-foot (12 m) track sections after the second launch needed to be replaced. These sections made up the heartline roll element and might have caused discomfort to passengers due to high g-forces. On May 17, 2007, the heartline roll was removed and was replaced with an s-curve. The s-curve transitions the existing track from a banked right curve to a banked left curve. Installation of the s-curve was completed on May 24 and final testing and licensing of the attraction resumed. On the same day, Cedar Point officials also announced that Maverick would debut on May 26.

== Ride experience ==
=== Layout ===
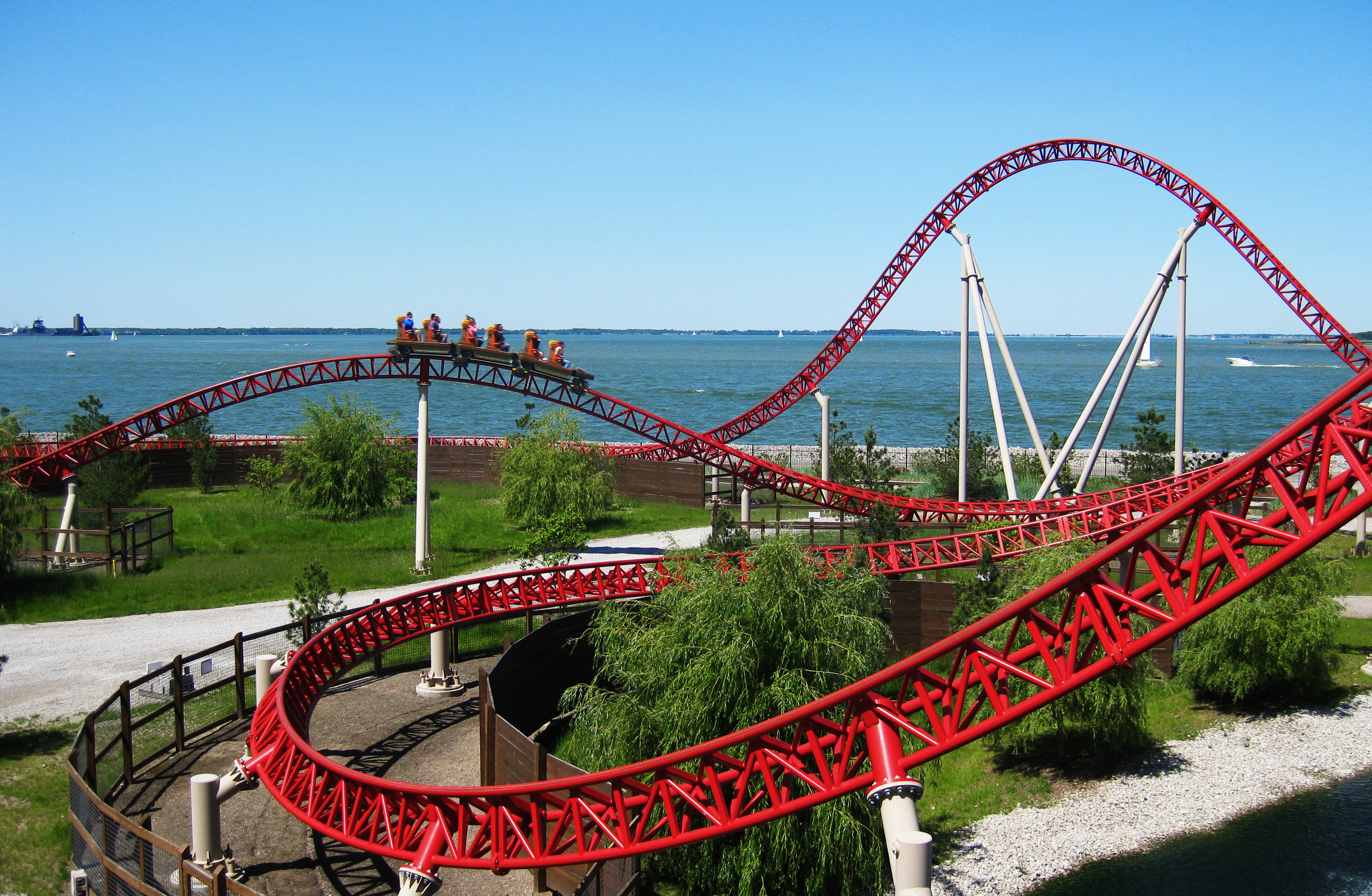
Maverick train and first airtime hill

Two trains are loaded and dispatched simultaneously. The front train is launched while the rear train sits at the bottom of the lift hill. Once the front train has reached the tunnel, the rear train is launched. The ride starts out with a LSM launch up a 105-foot (32 m) hill at 20 degrees. At the top of the hill, the train drops 100 feet (30 m) at a 95-degree angle. The train reaches a speed of 57 miles per hour (92 km/h) then goes through a series of banked turns, twisting right, left, and then right again. It then goes over a 74-foot (23 m) airtime hill, followed by a turn to the right into the Twisted Horseshoe Roll that features two 360-degree corkscrew rolls, back-to-back, with a 180-degree banked curve between the two corkscrews. The train then makes a turn to the right into the tunnel, during which riders slow down and encounter multiple railroad crossing signs and lanterns.

From the tunnel, which is underneath the station, the train is launched at 70 miles per hour (110 km/h), traveling for 400 feet (120 m). At the end of the tunnel, it goes up a hill with trim brakes, followed by a high-banked curve. The train then goes through a turn to the right into a canyon with an S-curve (where the heartline roll was originally supposed to be installed). Originally, water bombs shot off as the train enters the canyon, but this has since been removed. The train then passes under the lift hill through an over banked turn at 92 degrees. It then turns to the right into another overbanked turn followed by an airtime hill. The train then turns to the right into the brake run. One cycle of the ride lasts about 2 minutes and 30 seconds.

=== Trains/theme ===
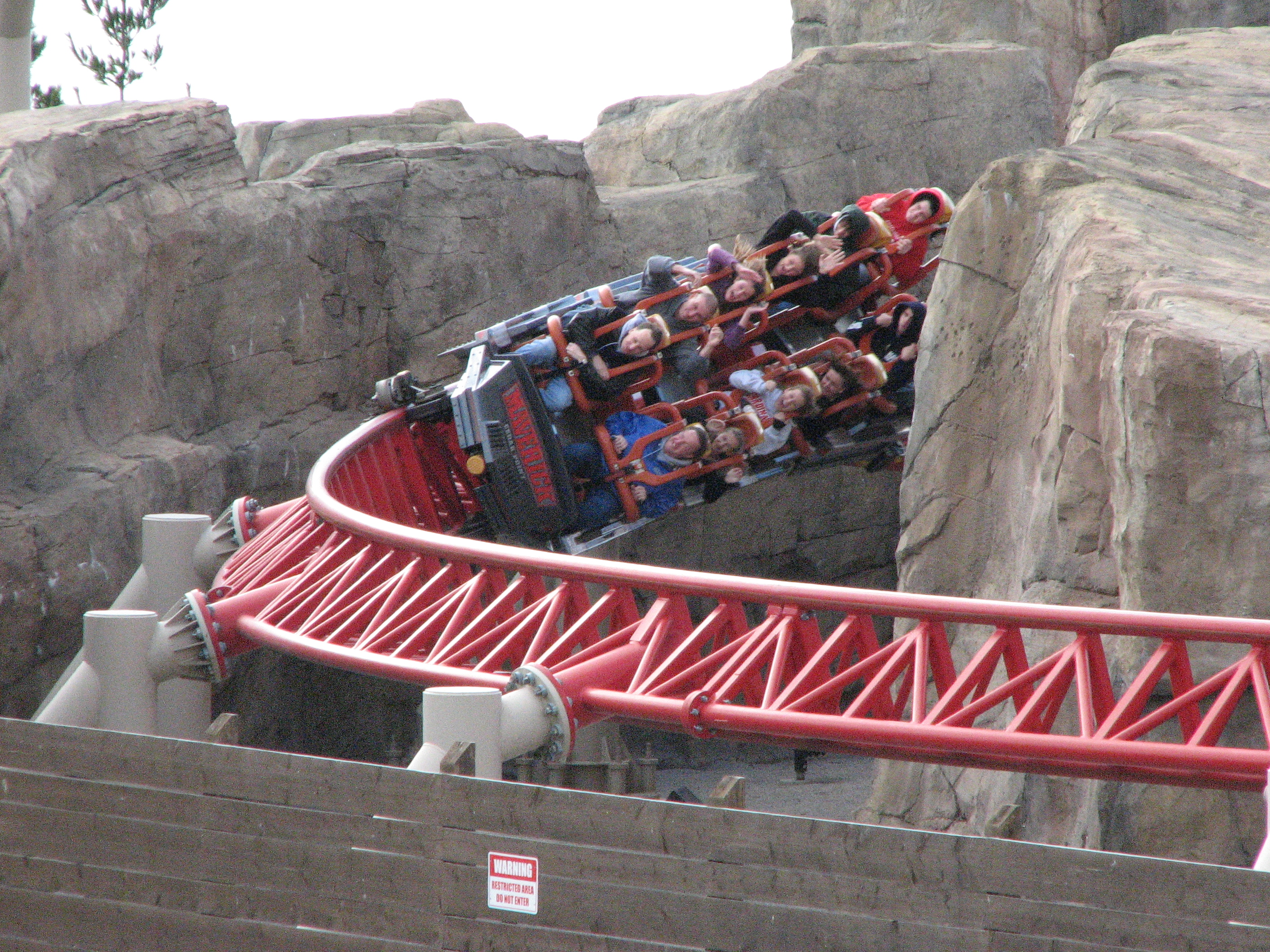
Maverick train exiting the first canyon

Maverick features six three-car steam-era style trains that seat twelve passengers each. The trains have tiered seating and are named and colored as follows: Bret, Brass; Brent, Gunmetal; Ben, Iron; Beau, Gold; Bart, Silver; Sam, Copper. The restraint system, similar to Accelerator Coasters, includes a hydraulic over the shoulder harness and an interlocking seat belt. The station features an elevated dual unloading and loading platform enabling two trains to be loaded and unloaded simultaneously. Maverick features western music, contributing to the western theme. There is also an elevator shaft designed to look like a silo, that also contributes to the western theme. The passenger height restriction was initially set to a minimum of 48 inches (120 cm). In May 2007, the height restriction was raised to a minimum of 52 inches (130 cm) per recommendations made by Intamin. At the 2015 Winter Chill Out, Cedar Point announced that the traditional over the shoulder restraints would be replaced with the soft vest style restraints found on Pantherian at Kings Dominion.

== Operation ==
Maverick is negatively affected by unfavorable weather conditions as a high velocity ride. "Rain, and/or lightning" may result in the closing of the ride depending on the severity. It will close under any kind of steady precipitation.

Passengers must be between 52 and 78 inches (130 and 200 cm) tall to ride. Some persons over a certain weight/waist size will not be permitted to ride if they cannot fit into the seat and lap bar harness. Passengers on Maverick may not bring any loose articles onto the train and will be required to wear shirts and footwear. Headphones must be removed before boarding. Glasses must also be secured by an athletic strap.

Guests are advised not to ride Maverick if they have "a history of recent surgery, heart trouble/high blood pressure, neck trouble, back trouble, or any other condition that may be aggravated by riding, or who are pregnant". Additionally, guests must have 3 functioning extremities in order to ride, only allowing for one leg amputation or one arm amputation.

== Awards ==
Maverick won the Golden Ticket Award for "Best New Ride in 2007" from Amusement Today magazine. It also won the award for "Best New Attraction in 2007" from the National Amusement Park Historical Association (NAPHA).

Golden Ticket Awards: Top steel Roller Coasters
Year									1998	1999
Ranking									–	–
Year	2000	2001	2002	2003	2004	2005	2006	2007	2008	2009
Ranking	–	–	–	–	–	–	–	13	12	15
Year	2010	2011	2012	2013	2014	2015	2016	2017	2018	2019
Ranking	21 (tie)	21	21	22	28 (tie)	22	12	10	9	13
Year	2020	2021	2022	2023	2024	2025	2026			
Ranking	N/A	9	10	9 (tie)	10	12	12			
