= Glenn Holland =

American businessman (1918–2002)

Harold Glenn Holland (1918-2002) was a developer from Arcadia, California, USA, who established the first amusement parks franchise, Santa's Village.

== Early life ==
Holland grew up during the Great Depression, and his parents died before his eighteenth birthday, leaving him to care for his younger sister and himself.

== Santa's Village ==
In 1953, Holland proposed Santa's Village after reading a Saturday Evening Post story about a similar project called North Pole in New York City. He set up a corporation that funded the amusement park and leased the land from the family of the general contractor, J. Putnam Henck.

In the early 1950s, Holland sketched his idea of a Christmas fairyland filled with enormous candy canes, animals and gingerbread houses. Holland developed this idea into a working plan and sought investors for his project. He traveled the country promoting his Santa's Village concept and selling $45 stock shares, and eventually listed his company, Santa's Village Corporation, on the California Stock Exchange.

Around the same time, Walt Disney was building Disneyland. Holland contacted Disney, and they reportedly corresponded for a time. While Disney was already wealthy from his films, Holland was an unknown.

Holland was also friends with Dick and Maurice McDonald. The McDonald brothers told him about their business idea with Ray Kroc for their eponymous chain of fast-food restaurants. The story inspired Holland to franchise his parks.

The first Santa's Village opened on Memorial Day in 1955, six weeks before Disneyland, in Skyforest near Lake Arrowhead in San Bernardino County, California. It closed in 1998. A second Santa's Village opened in 1957 near Scotts Valley in Santa Cruz County, California, staying open until 1979. The last Santa's Village opened in 1959 in the Chicago suburb of East Dundee and closed in 2006. The park reopened under new ownership in 2011 and continues to operate to this day as Santa's Village. The Skyforest, California location was reopened in late 2016 and renamed SkyPark at Santa's Village.

Holland had planned for the Dundee Park to be the hub of a nationwide chain of Santa's Villages. The other two, in Richmond, Virginia, and Cherry Hill, New Jersey, were never built.

Despite the park's early popularity, Holland had not planned for the freezing weather in Illinois. While his West Coast parks stayed open year-round, with the best attendance in the weeks before Christmas, the Chicago area was too cold. Eventually, Santa's Village in East Dundee was in the odd position of being closed at Christmas. The miscalculation helped lead to the collapse of the company. Finances were stretched thin. By 1965, investors rebelled. Holland left the company, and the parks were sold.

"Where he made the error was going on and doing the final one in Illinois. It was just not financially a good idea," said Reece, his daughter. "But he knew he had touched people with the parks. It was the most special thing he felt he had ever done."

Holland later became a real estate developer and died in 2002 at 84.
