= SkyPark at Santa's Village =

American amusement park

- Previously known as Santa's Village (1955–1998)

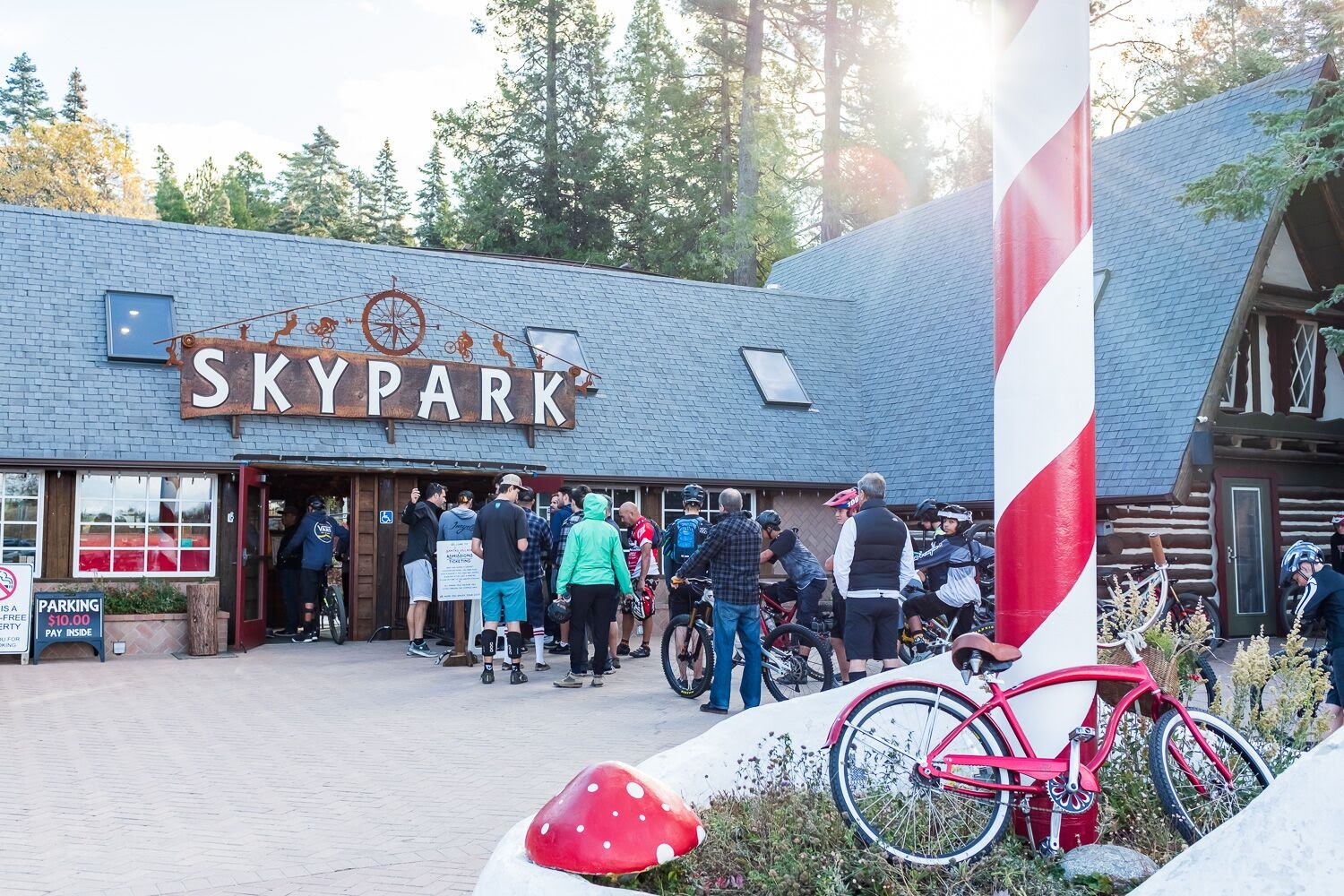
- Interactive map of SkyPark at Santa's Village
- Location: Skyforest, Lake Arrowhead, California, U.S.
- Coordinates: 34.2327483°N 117.1710950°W
- Opened: May 28, 1955 (as Santa's Village); December 2, 2016 (as SkyPark at Santa's Village)
- General manager: Bill Johnson
- Theme: Outdoor adventure park
- Operating season: All year
- Website: Official website

SkyPark at Santa's Village is an outdoor adventure park in the Skyforest section of Lake Arrowhead, California. It opened on December 2, 2016, on the site of the former Santa's Village amusement park, which operated from 1955 until 1998.

== History ==
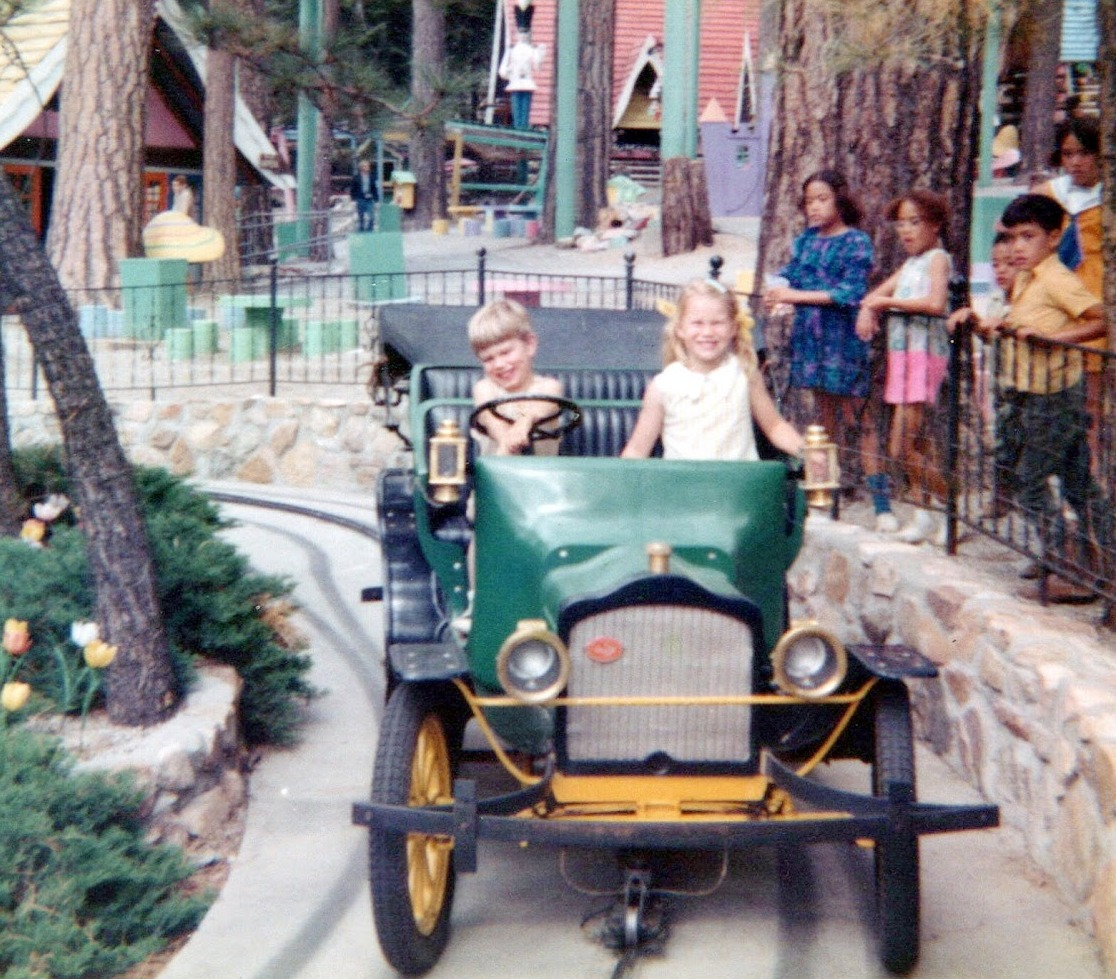
Auto driving attraction for children at Santa's Village (Spring 1972)

The previous Santa's Village was opened in May 1955. It was the first franchised amusement park, one of three built by developer Glenn Holland. The others, also defunct, were in Scotts Valley, California, and East Dundee, Illinois (the East Dundee park reopened in 2011 under new ownership as Santa's Village AZoosment Park). Opening more than a month before Disneyland, the 230-acre (0.93 km^{2}) park was one of Southern California's biggest tourist attractions. It had kiddie rides, including a bobsled, monorail, and Ferris wheel. It also had a petting zoo, live reindeer and shops including a bakery, candy kitchen and toy shop.

Reduced attendance and revenue shortfalls caused the park to close on March 1, 1998. The property sold three years later for $5.6 million, and served as a staging area for logging operations. The faded candy cane signpost and dilapidated buildings became a ghost town along the Rim of the World Highway.

In June 2014, the park was sold to a new owner who planned to operate it as a year-round tourist destination. After renovations of 18 original Santa's Village buildings and restoration projects in the surrounding forest, it reopened on December 2, 2016, as an outdoor adventure park named SkyPark at Santa's Village.

== Description ==
The park resides on 230 acres (0.93 km^{2}) of natural forest with meadowlands, ponds and an apple orchard. At the core of SkyPark is The Village, which includes historic log cabin restaurants and shops, seasonal entertainment, and open-air activities. SkyPark’s nearly 10 miles (16 km) of year-round mountain bike trails, hiking trails, fly fishing, archery, ziplines, seasonal ice skating or roller skating rink, rock climbing and more are available to the public for the price of admission. SkyPark’s conservation program includes the Henck Meadowlands Conservation Trail, conservation hikes, and offers outdoor educational programs for school-age children. 30 acres (0.12 km^{2}) of the park has been preserved in their pristine condition to remain unused.
