= Magic Harbor =

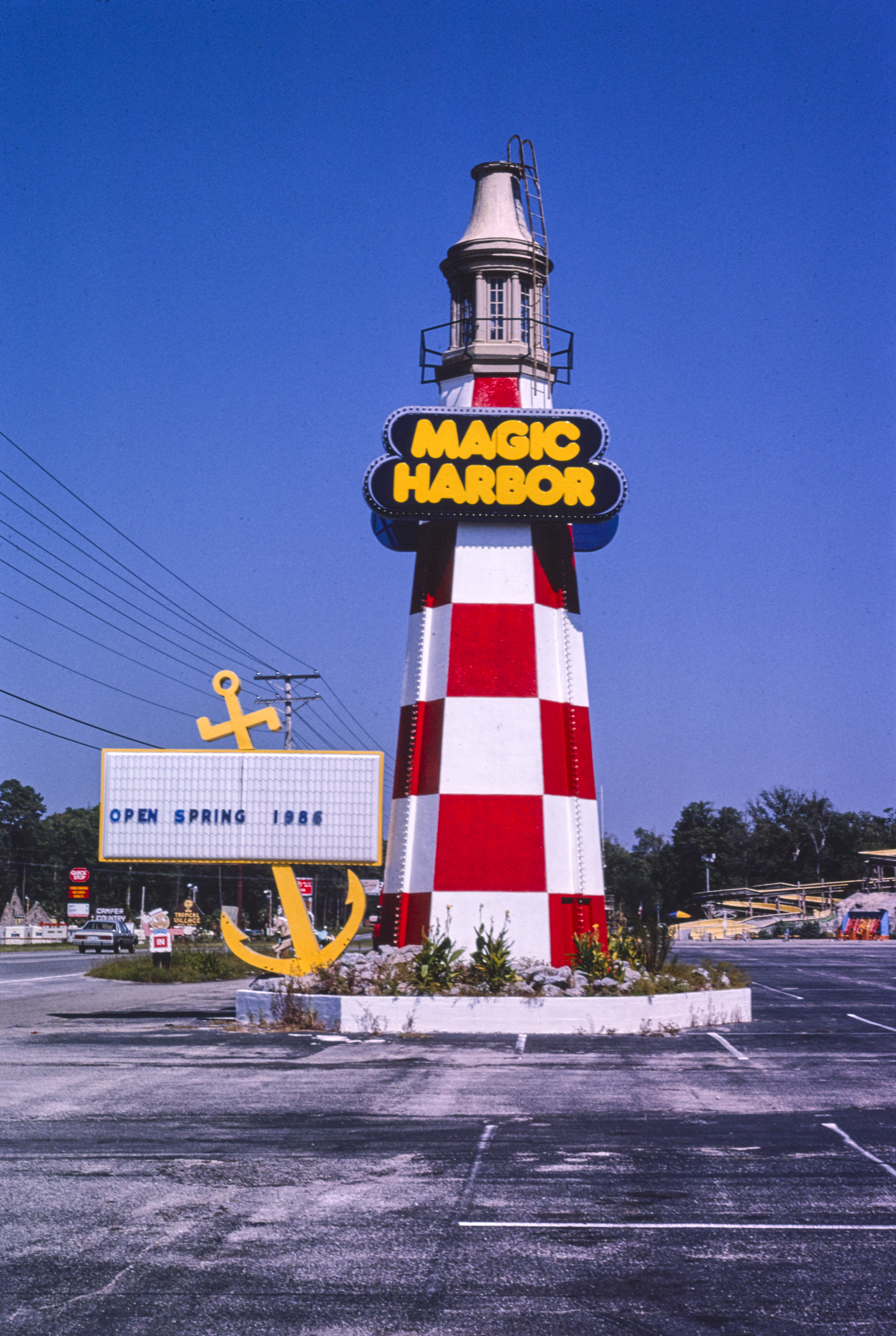
Magic Harbor lighthouse sign, Surfside Beach, South Carolina – from John Margolies Roadside America photograph archive (1972–2008)

Magic Harbor was an amusement park located south of Myrtle Beach, South Carolina that operated from 1954 until the mid-1990s. Originally called PirateLand, it was renamed for its 1975 re-opening with a revamped British theme. The site is now occupied by two campgrounds.
