= White Water Landing (Cedar Point) =

Defunct log flume ride

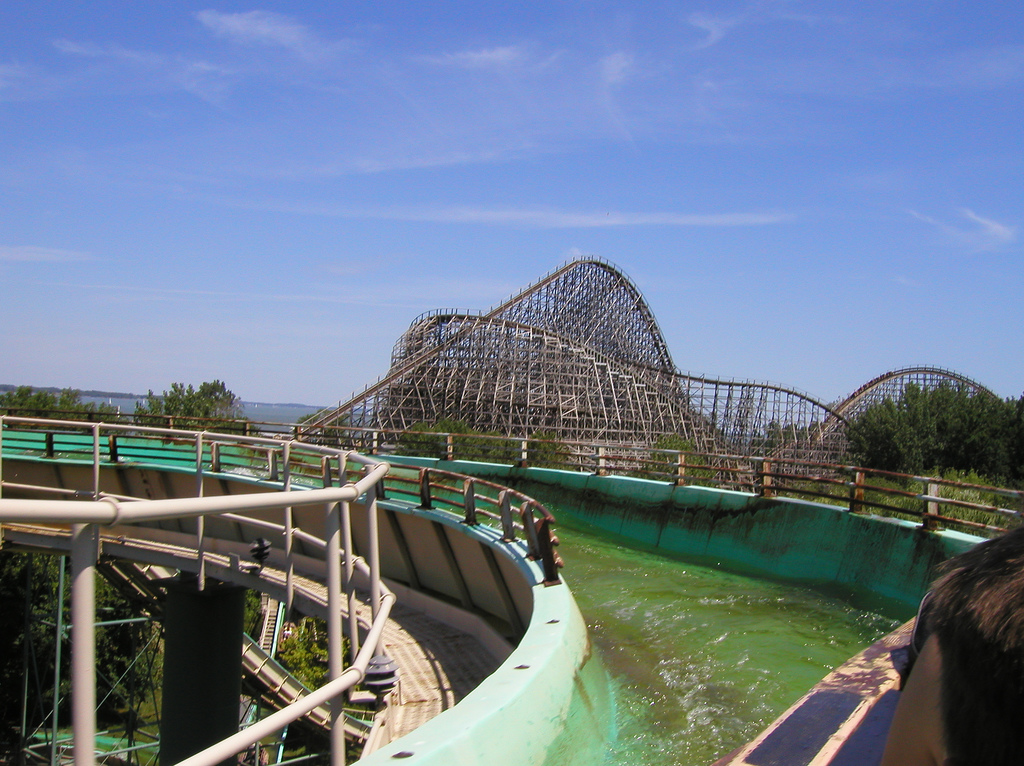
- Inside one of the boats with Mean Streak in the background

Cedar Point
- Area: Frontiertown
- Coordinates: 41°29′8″N 82°41′33″W
- Status: Removed
- Cost: $3.4 million
- Opening date: 1982
- Closing date: October 31, 2005
- Replaced: Shoot the Rapids; Swan Boats
- Replaced by: Maverick

General statistics
- Type: Log flume
- Manufacturer: Arrow Dynamics
- Model: Hydro flume
- Lift system: Conveyor belt
- Height: 50 ft (15 m)
- Drop: 45 ft (14 m)
- Length: 2,370 ft (720 m)
- Speed: 35 mph (56 km/h)
- Max vertical angle: 40°

White Water Landing was a log flume water ride at Cedar Point amusement park in Sandusky, Ohio, United States. It opened in 1982 and was located in the Frontier Town section of the park near Mean Streak adjacent to the Cedar Point & Lake Erie Railroad. The water ride last operated on October 30, 2005, and it was replaced by Maverick in 2007.

== Ride experience ==
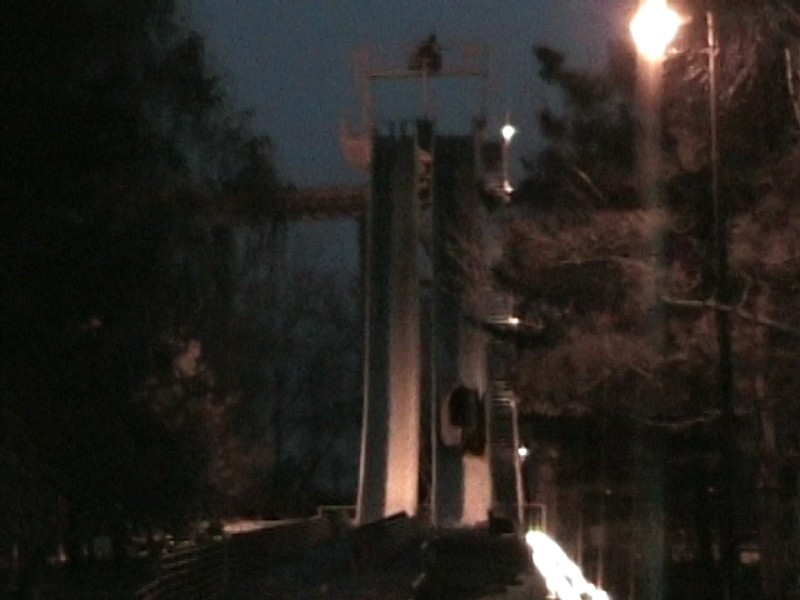
The double drop of White Water Landing at night

As part of the Frontier Town area of the park, White Water Landing embraced an Appalachian river ride theme. The revolving station featured boats alongside a rustic warehouse before they turned along the edge of a lagoon and approached the ride's first lift — a conveyor that gently elevated the canoes through a mine shaft and splashed them into a faster section of river. A few quick turns along the rapids and the canoes approached the second lift, which raised riders to the treetops at a height of 50 feet.

Canoes alternated drop chutes, then skimmed the hydro-jump before floating alongside the lagoon as they returned to the station.

== Incident ==
On July 20, 2002, two boats got jammed together at the bottom of the hill. When the next boat came down the hill, it collided with another boat. All six people only suffered minor injuries and were transported to a local hospital where they were shortly released. The ride reopened the next day after an investigation.

== Closure ==
On October 13, 2005 Cedar Point announced that White Water Landing would permanently close at the end of the 2005 season to make room for a new attraction. Its last day of operation was October 30, 2005. Details weren't released until September 7, 2006, when the park unveiled plans for the new $21-million Maverick roller coaster. The station and queue from White Water Landing were retained and reused for Maverick.
