= Sword of Destiny (disambiguation) =

Sword of Destiny may refer to:

- Sword of Destiny, a 1992 anthology of short stories by Andrzej Sapkowski
- Crouching Tiger, Hidden Dragon: Sword of Destiny, Netflix film sequel to Crouching Tiger, Hidden Dragon, part of the Crane-Iron (Chinese: 鶴鐵系列) wuxia franchise
- Sword of Destiny (Arrested Development), a season 2 episode of Arrested Development

== See also ==
- Sword of state
- The Sword of Truth
- Excalibur (disambiguation)
- Magic sword (disambiguation)
- The Sword in the Stone (disambiguation)
- Spear of Destiny (disambiguation)
- Destiny (disambiguation)
