= Excalibur (disambiguation) =

Excalibur is the mythical sword of King Arthur.

Excalibur may also refer to:

== Arts, entertainment, and media ==
=== Fictional entities ===
- Excalibur (comics), a superhero group in Marvel Comics (see below for comics featuring the group)
- Faiza Hussain, later codenamed Excalibur, a Marvel Comics superhero
- Excalibur, a talking sword character in Soul Eater
- Excalibur, the sword used by Saber throughout most of the Fate series
- Excalibur, the sword which was broken into seven different swords in High School DxD
- Excalibur, the right arm of Capricorn Saint from Saint Seiya
- Excalibur, a sword in the video game Sonic and the Black Knight (2009)
- Excalibur Sonic, a transformation and/or form which appears in the video game Sonic and the Black Knight (2009)
- Excalibur, a sword in the manga The Seven Deadly Sins (Nanatsu no Taizai)
- Excalibur, an obtainable sword in the video game Tomb Raider: Legend (2006)
- Excalibur, a playable character from Warframe
- Excalibur, an obtainable sword in the video game Terraria

=== Literature ===
- Excalibur (comic book), several comic books featuring the Marvel Comics group
- Excalibur (L. Ron Hubbard), an unpublished 1938 manuscript composed by Scientology founder L. Ron Hubbard
- Excalibur (novel), a 1973 fantasy novel by Sanders Anne Laubenthal
- Excalibur: A Novel of Arthur, a 1997 novel by Bernard Cornwell in his series The Warlord Chronicles

=== Music ===
- Excalibur (Grave Digger album), 1999
- Excalibur (rock opera), a 1998 rock opera written and directed by Alan Simon
- Excalibur (Tom Fogerty album), 1972

=== Rollercoasters ===
- Excalibur (Funtown Splashtown USA), a roller coaster at Funtown Splashtown USA in Saco, Maine, United States
- Excalibur (Valleyfair), a roller coaster at Valleyfair amusement park in Shakopee, Minnesota, United States
- Excalibur, a former roller coaster at Six Flags AstroWorld

=== Television ===
- "Excalibur", a 1985 episode of the cartoon G.I. Joe: A Real American Hero
- Excalibur, a BBC Two television ident first aired in 2000 (see BBC Two '1991–2001' idents)

=== Video games ===
- Excalibur (video game), a 1983 video game
- Excalibur: Morgana's Revenge, a 2007 first-person shooter video game
- Excalibur 2555 AD, a 1997 action-adventure video game

=== Other uses in arts, entertainment, and media ===
- Excalibur (film), a 1981 film about the legend of King Arthur
- Excalibur (newspaper), the community newspaper of York University, Toronto
- Excalibur (board game), published in 1989

== Brands and enterprises ==
- Excalibur (nightclub), a nightclub in Chicago, Illinois, United States
- Excalibur, a brand of non-stick surface
- Excalibur Airways, a defunct UK airline
- Excalibur Hotel and Casino, a hotel and casino in Las Vegas, Nevada, United States
- Excalibur series, an electric guitar built by Vigier Guitars
- HTC Excalibur, a smartphone manufactured by High Tech Computer

== Computing and technology ==
- Excalibur, a prehistoric axe made of red quartzite found at the Archaeological site of Atapuerca, Spain
- Excalibur BBS, a Windows-based GUI BBS client
- Project Excalibur, an initiative to develop an orbiting nuclear-bomb-pumped X-ray laser
- Devuan Excalibur

== Places ==
- Excalibur (Arizona), a summit in Arizona, United States
- Excalibur Estate, a housing estate in Catford, South London, England
- Excalibur Pot, a cave/pothole in the North Yorkshire Moors, United Kingdom

== Transport ==
- Excalibur (automobile), an American specialty car introduced in 1963 with bodywork similar to a 1928 Mercedes-Benz
- Excalibur (racing yacht), an Australian racing yacht
- Excalibur, one of three Sikorsky VS-44 flying boats
- Excalibur Aircraft Excalibur, an ultralight aircraft
- Excalibur 800, an aftermarket conversion of the Beechcraft Twin Bonanza twin-engined aircraft, originally developed by Swearingen Aircraft
- Excalibur Queen Air, a similar aftermarket conversion of the Beechcraft Queen Air twin-engined aircraft, also originally developed by Swearingen
- HMS Excalibur, a ship in the British Royal Navy
- Lockheed Model 44 Excalibur, a cancelled four-engined airliner

== Weapons ==
- Excalibur rifle, an Indian assault rifle based on the INSAS.
- M982 Excalibur, 155mm GPS-guided extended range artillery projectile

== Other uses ==
- British Columbia Excalibur Party, a minor political party in British Columbia, Canada
- Excalibur (wrestler), former professional wrestler and current color commentator for All Elite Wrestling
- Excalibur Primary School, a school in Alsager, United Kingdom
- Excalibur, a dog euthanized during a 2014 outbreak of Ebola virus disease in Spain

== See also ==
- DJ Excalibah, English DJ and theatre director Matthew Xia
- King Arthur (disambiguation)
- The Sword in the Stone (disambiguation)
- Xcalibur (disambiguation)
