= River King Mine Train =

Theme park attraction

- River King Mine Train in June 2002

Mid America Adventure
- Location: Mid America Adventure
- Park section: Gateway to the West
- Coordinates: 38.515499°N 90.673765°W
- Status: Operating
- Opening date: June 5, 1971

General statistics
- Type: Steel – Mine Train
- Manufacturer: Arrow Dynamics
- Model: Mine Train
- Height: 32 ft (9.8 m)
- Drop: 41 ft (12 m)
- Length: 2,500 ft (760 m)
- Speed: 37 mph (60 km/h)
- Inversions: 0
- Duration: 3:00
- Capacity: 1800 riders per hour
- Height restriction: 48 in (122 cm)
- Trains: 5 cars; riders arranged 2 across in 3 rows for a total of 30 riders per train
- Fast Lane available
- River King Mine Train at RCDB

River King Mine Train is a steel mine train roller coaster at Mid America Adventure in Eureka, Missouri. Built in 1971, it was the park's first coaster and opened with the park on June 5, 1971. It is the oldest operating permanent coaster in the state of Missouri. The actual ride itself is one of two tracks, one which was later sold. Today, the ride operates with its original name. The ride has also received modern upgrades, including a new control panel. It is a popular family and beginner coaster, since it is the smallest in the park. Often called simply the Mine Train, it is unique in the fact that it has no automatic system for the lap bars; instead, employees have to manually lock and unlock the bars. Trains are five cars with riders arranged two across in three rows. In total, the coaster has three trains that have a total capacity of 90 riders (30 each).

== History ==
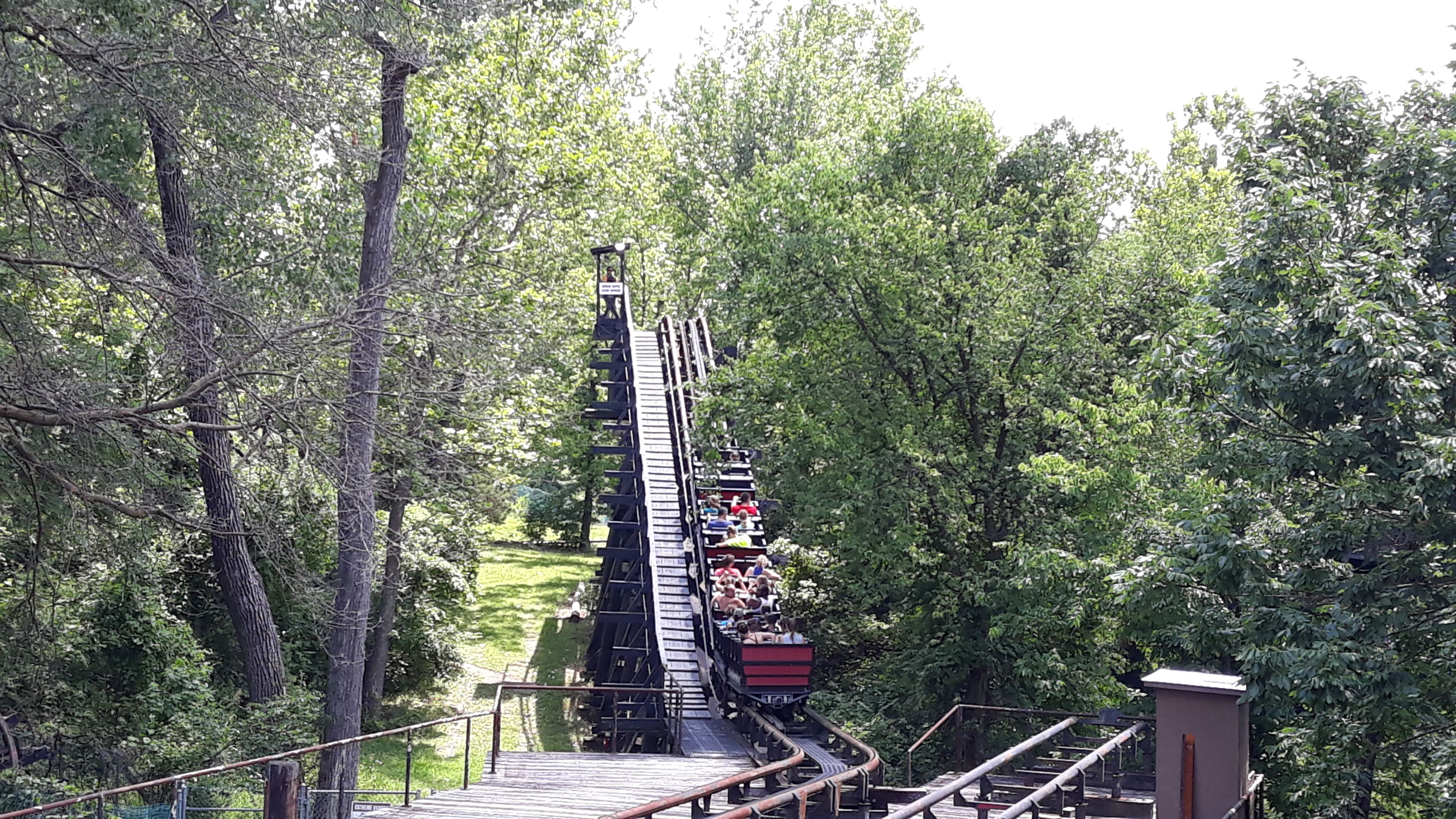
A train climbing one of the lift hills.

In 1971, Mid America Adventure along with Arrow Dynamics, built the park's first coaster. One year after it was installed, the name was changed to the River King Run-Away Mine Train. During the 1984 season, major alterations were made to the ride including the addition of stand up cars, paint detail and changes to the track. In addition, the roller coaster was renamed the Rail Blazer. Due to a death the same year on it, the modifications were undone and its first name returned. Eventually, a modern control panel was put in. Also, the trains received a divider between seats.

The River King Mine Train was named for the River King Coal Mine in the southeastern St. Louis exurb of Freeburg, Illinois. The 2,000-acre mine site was operated by Peabody Coal (now named Peabody Energy) from 1957 to 1989. After the closure of the large mine in 1989, Peabody donated some 1,800 acres of the 2,000-acre site to the Illinois Department of Natural Resources in 1994. The site is now the state owned and managed Peabody-River King State Fish and Wildlife Area and is open to the public for use by anglers, hunters, and other outdoor enthusiasts for recreational opportunities in the southeastern portion of Greater St. Louis.

== Secondary track ==
When the River King Mine Train was built, it had two tracks. In 1988, it was sold to Dollywood where it was renamed Thunder Express and later moved to Magic Springs as Big Bad John where it still operates with modifications. The second track was removed after the Ninja came in from Vancouver. This track was not outfitted with the modifications that the other track received.

== Ride experience ==
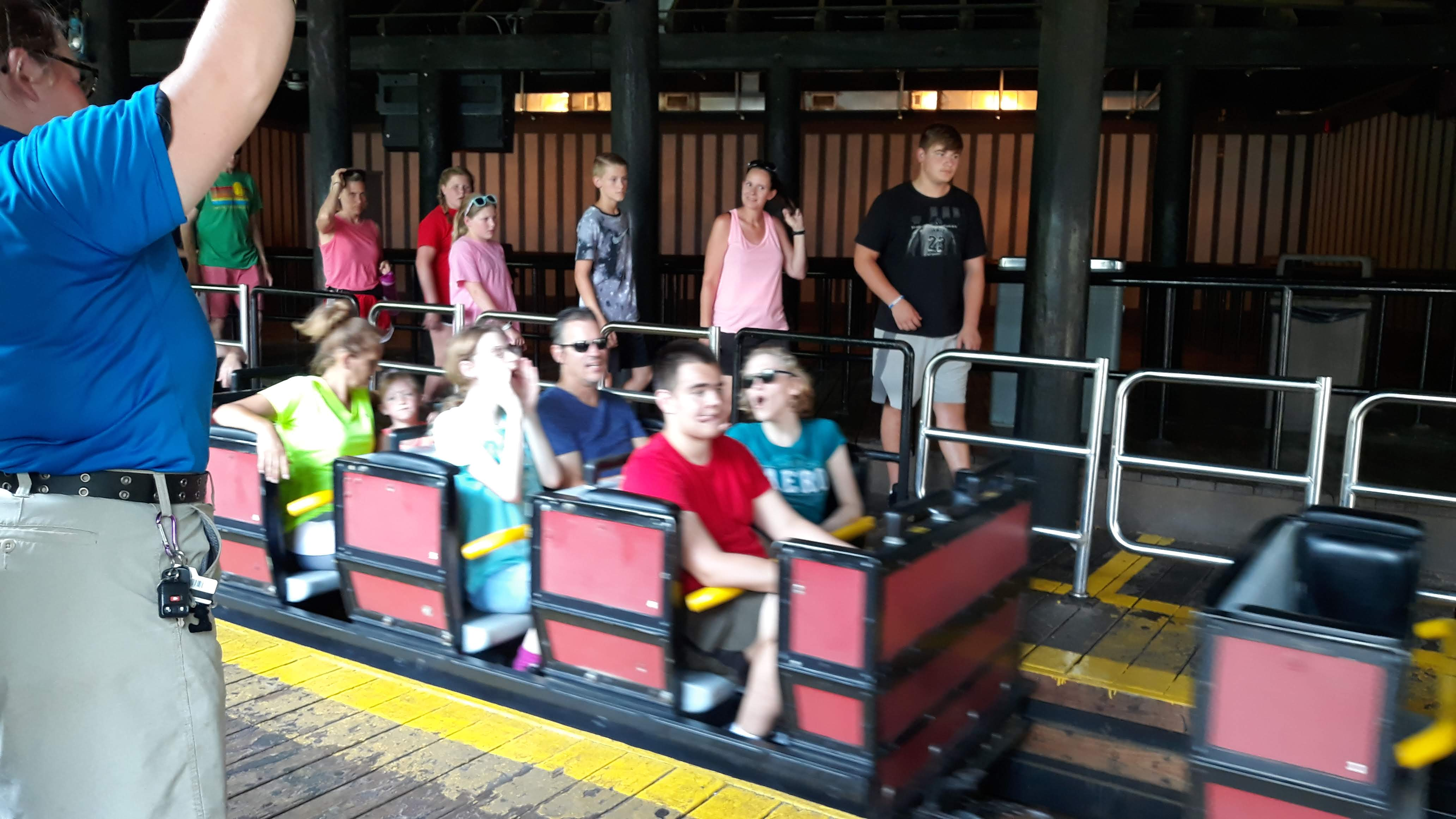
A train in the loading station.

Upon leaving the station, the train takes a short drop and then does a 180° turn to the right. After passing the train storage area, it takes a short turn to the left. Then, up the first lift hill. At the top, a short dip followed by a slight right turn is taken. The train then dives 180° to the left to the ground. After a slight right turn, it then proceeds to take a 270° left turn crossing over the tracks it was just on. After another slight right turn, it climbs the second lift hill. The track does the same thing as the first lift hill, but finishes with a 360° turn instead. After a bunny hop, a slight climbing right 180* turn, the train climbs a small last lift hill. The train goes slight right, then slight left, with another slight right. The train then drops into the mine. After briefly leveling out at the bottom, it then climbs out. After some braking, it then takes a slight right, and goes into the station brake run.

== Incidents ==
On July 7, 1984, a 46-year-old woman from Indianapolis, Indiana was riding the Rail Blazer roller coaster when she was flung from the ride and fell 20 feet (6.1 m) to her death. Park officials claimed that the woman fainted and fell out of the car, but her husband, who had been beside her, said that she had not fainted but had simply been tossed from the ride when it whipped around a curve. At the time, the ride was only the third stand-up roller coaster in the world. Following this incident, the stand-up trains were recalled and the ride was converted back to a sit-down coaster.
