= Freeburg, Illinois =

Freeburg
- Village
- Location of Freeburg in St. Clair County, Illinois.
- Coordinates: 38°25′47″N 89°53′38″W
- Country: United States
- State: Illinois
- County: St. Clair

Area
  - Total: 7.10 sq mi (18.39 km^{2})
  - Land: 6.85 sq mi (17.73 km^{2})
  - Water: 0.25 sq mi (0.66 km^{2})
- Elevation: 518 ft (158 m)

Population (2020)
  - Total: 4,582
  - Density: 669.4/sq mi (258.47/km^{2})
- Time zone: UTC-6 (CST)
  - Summer (DST): UTC-5 (CDT)
- ZIP code: 62243
- Area code: 618
- FIPS code: 17-27806
- GNIS feature ID: 2398923
- Website: http://www.freeburg.com

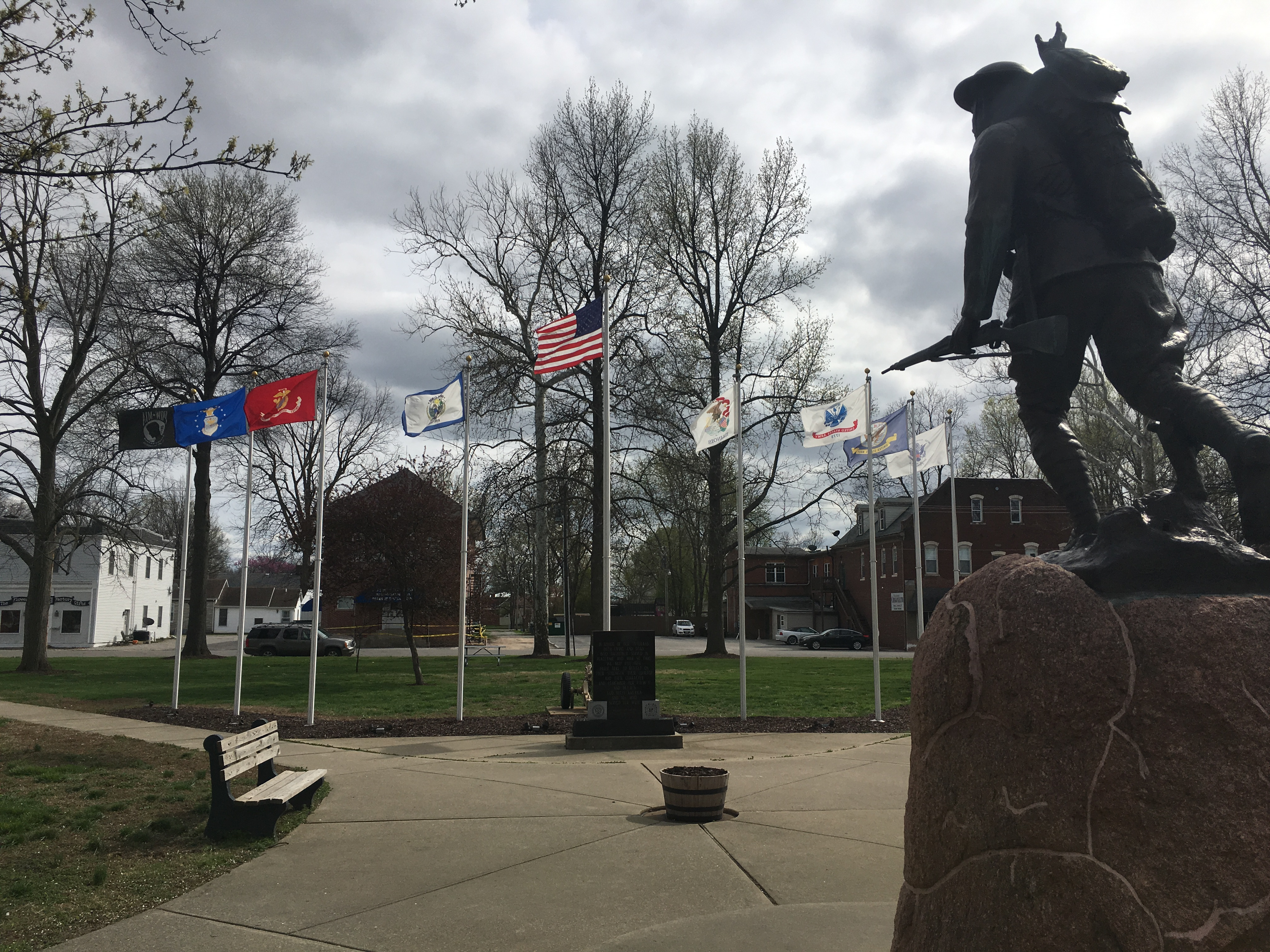
Military memorial in the village page

Freeburg is a village in St. Clair County, Illinois, United States. Located within Greater St. Louis, it is a southeastern exurb with many residents commuting to Downtown St. Louis or the Belleville area for employment. As of the 2020 census, Freeburg had a population of 4,582.

== History ==
Freeburg lies in the fertile and rolling southern Illinois plains between the Kaskaskia and Mississippi Rivers. It was platted in 1836 as the town of Urbana by immigrants to this area from Virginia around 1800. The first European settlers of Freeburg were of English and Irish ancestry.

There were five migratory Native American tribes that crisscrossed each other in Illinois; the Peorias, Cahokias, Kaskaskias, Tamaroas, and Michiganics. Turkey Hill to the north of town was a popular Native campground that also attracted many early settlers because of the view it provided of the surrounding countryside. The last Indian tribes left this area by 1820.

Attracted by the abundance of coal, the availability of cheap and fertile farmland, as well as the proximity to the frontier city of St. Louis, which was located only 20 miles to the northwest of the area, large-scale German migrations to the area began around 1830 and continued at a consistent rate for the rest of the century.

The old "Plank Road" was built in the 1850s, and, for 35 cents, travelers could ride from Belleville to Freeburg in "comfort" without potholes on what is now known as the old Freeburg Road. Abraham Lincoln is said to have used this road on at least one occasion.

In 1851, the post office came, and when it was found that there was another town of Urbana in Illinois, the city fathers changed the name in 1859 to Freeburg after the city of Freiburg in the region of Baden, Germany, from which some of the early settlers had come.

The town was incorporated in 1867 with 808 residents. The railroad came in 1869 and exchanged owners several times before being sold to the Illinois Central.

In the heyday of independent coal mines, as many as 1500 miners lived here, and in 1874, there were 10 hotels for them to choose from if they could not find more permanent lodging. With the closing of the Peabody River King Mine just east of Freeburg in 1989, coal no longer played a dominant role in the local economy.

The River King Mine Train at Mid America Adventure was named for the River King Coal Mine located in Freeburg. The 2,000-acre mine site was operated by Peabody Coal (now named Peabody Energy) from 1957 to 1989. After the closure of the large mine in 1989, Peabody donated some 1,800 acres of the 2,000-acre site to the Illinois Department of Natural Resources in 1994. The site is now the state owned and managed Peabody-River King State Fish and Wildlife Area and is open to the public for use by anglers, hunters, and other outdoor enthusiasts for recreational opportunities in the southeastern portion of Greater St. Louis.

In 2022, mayor Seth Speiser was given a citation for poaching by the Illinois Conversation Police.

== Geography ==
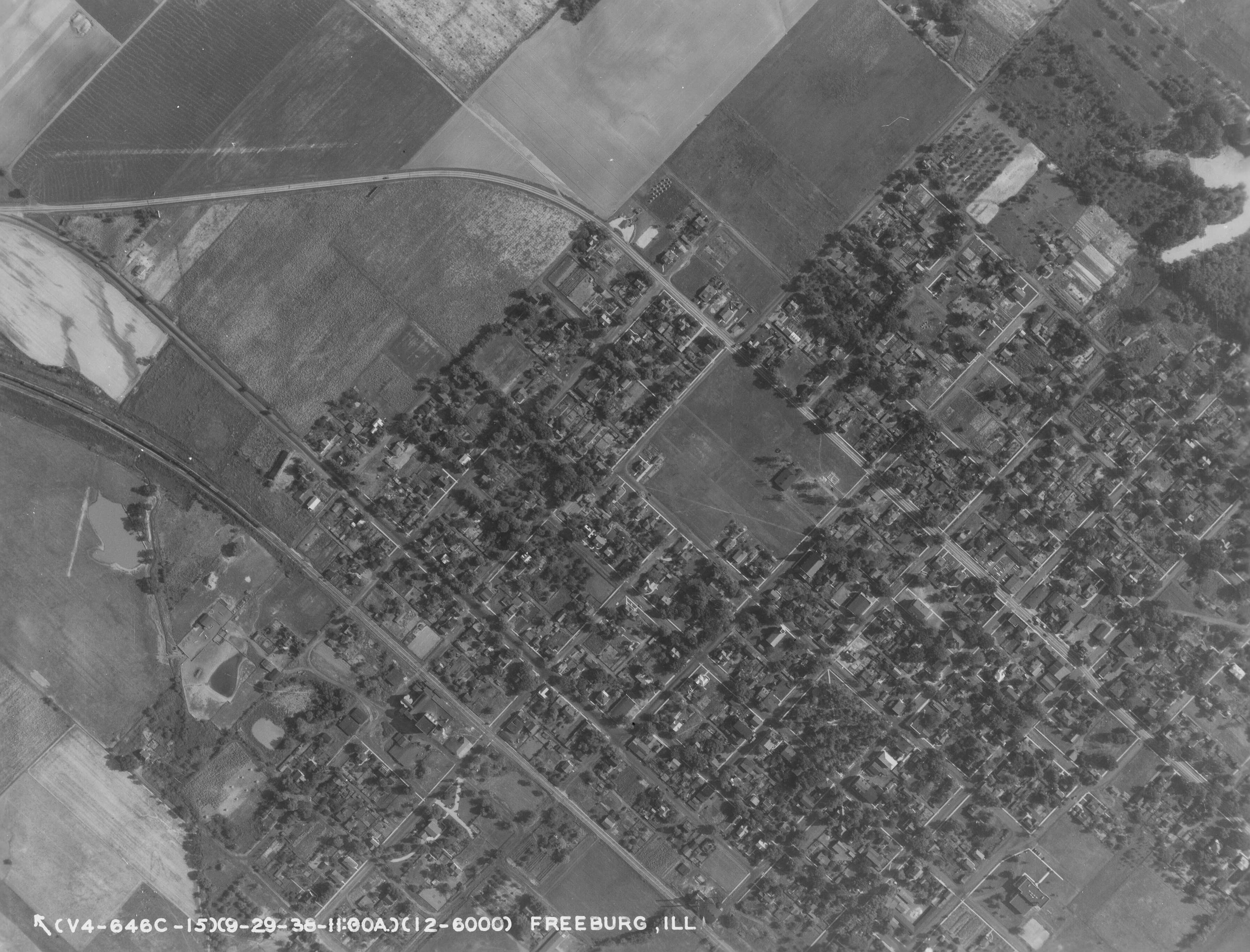
View of Freeburg, 1938

According to the 2010 census, Freeburg has a total area of 7.025 square miles (18.19 km^{2}), of which 6.77 square miles (17.53 km^{2}) (or 96.37%) is land and 0.255 square miles (0.66 km^{2}) (or 3.63%) is water.

Freeburg has historically been a farming community, but as the nearby cities of Belleville and Fairview Heights have grown, parts of Freeburg have been developed with subdivisions that resemble a suburb.

Freeburg enjoys a low crime rate, particularly compared to the cities immediately to its north, and land values have attracted some commuters who live in Freeburg and work the short distance to St. Louis, Missouri.

=== Climate ===
The climate in this area is characterized by hot, humid summers and generally cool winters. According to the Köppen Climate Classification system, Freeburg, IL has a humid subtropical climate, abbreviated "Cfa" on climate maps.

Climate data for Freeburg, IL
Month	Jan	Feb	Mar	Apr	May	Jun	Jul	Aug	Sep	Oct	Nov	Dec	Year
Mean daily maximum °F (°C)	40.5 (4.7)	45.5 (7.5)	56.4 (13.6)	67.8 (19.9)	76.8 (24.9)	85.6 (29.8)	89.0 (31.7)	88.2 (31.2)	81.1 (27.3)	69.9 (21.1)	56.8 (13.8)	43.3 (6.3)	66.7 (19.3)
Mean daily minimum °F (°C)	22.2 (−5.4)	25.6 (−3.6)	34.8 (1.6)	45.0 (7.2)	54.8 (12.7)	63.9 (17.7)	67.7 (19.8)	65.5 (18.6)	56.6 (13.7)	45.9 (7.7)	36.1 (2.3)	25.7 (−3.5)	45.3 (7.4)
Average precipitation inches (mm)	2.4 (61)	2.5 (64)	3.4 (86)	3.9 (99)	4.8 (120)	4.3 (110)	4.2 (110)	3.4 (86)	3.4 (86)	3.5 (89)	4.2 (110)	3.1 (79)	43.1 (1,100)
Average snowfall inches (cm)	3.9 (9.9)	3.5 (8.9)	1.0 (2.5)	0.3 (0.76)	0 (0)	0 (0)	0 (0)	0 (0)	0 (0)	0 (0)	0.3 (0.76)	3.1 (7.9)	12.1 (30.72)
Average precipitation days	6.5	6	9	10	11	9	7	7	6.5	8	8	8	96
Average snowy days	2	2	0.5	0.1	0	0	0	0	0	0	0.1	2	6.7
Source: NOAA

== Demographics ==
Historical population
Census	Pop.	Note	%±
1860	560		—
1870	920		64.3%
1880	1,038		12.8%
1890	848		−18.3%
1900	1,214		43.2%
1910	1,397		15.1%
1920	1,594		14.1%
1930	1,434		−10.0%
1940	1,507		5.1%
1950	1,661		10.2%
1960	1,908		14.9%
1970	2,495		30.8%
1980	2,989		19.8%
1990	3,115		4.2%
2000	3,872		24.3%
2010	4,354		12.4%
2020	4,582		5.2%
U.S. Decennial Census

=== 2020 census ===
As of the 2020 census, Freeburg had a population of 4,582. The median age was 43.3 years. 21.6% of residents were under the age of 18 and 20.9% of residents were 65 years of age or older. For every 100 females there were 93.7 males, and for every 100 females age 18 and over there were 90.7 males age 18 and over.

0.0% of residents lived in urban areas, while 100.0% lived in rural areas.

There were 1,760 households in Freeburg, of which 30.0% had children under the age of 18 living in them. Of all households, 54.2% were married-couple households, 15.1% were households with a male householder and no spouse or partner present, and 24.8% were households with a female householder and no spouse or partner present. About 25.9% of all households were made up of individuals and 11.9% had someone living alone who was 65 years of age or older.

There were 1,872 housing units, of which 6.0% were vacant. The homeowner vacancy rate was 1.9% and the rental vacancy rate was 8.4%.

Racial composition as of the 2020 census
Race	Number	Percent
White	4,274	93.3%
Black or African American	41	0.9%
American Indian and Alaska Native	11	0.2%
Asian	9	0.2%
Native Hawaiian and Other Pacific Islander	8	0.2%
Some other race	27	0.6%
Two or more races	212	4.6%
Hispanic or Latino (of any race)	110	2.4%

=== 2000 census ===
As of the 2000 census, there were 3,872 people, 1,414 households, and 1,063 families residing in the village. The population density was 1,215.1 inhabitants per square mile (469.2/km^{2}). There were 1,485 housing units at an average density of 466.0 per square mile (179.9/km^{2}). The racial makeup of the village was 98.55% White, 0.15% African American, 0.28% Native American, 0.21% Asian, 0.10% Pacific Islander, 0.21% from other races, and 0.49% from two or more races. Hispanic or Latino of any race were 1.11% of the population.

Of households, 39.2% had children under the age of 18 living with them, 60.1% were married couples living together, 11.7% had a female householder with no husband present, and 24.8% were non-families. 21.9% of all households were made up of individuals, and 10.5% had someone living alone who was 65 years of age or older. The average household size was 2.65 and the average family size was 3.08.

In the village, the population was spread out, with 27.1% under the age of 18, 6.9% from 18 to 24, 29.3% from 25 to 44 22.0% from 45 to 64, and 14.6% who were 65 years of age or older. The median age was 38 years. For every 100 females, there were 91.9 males. For every 100 females age 18 and over, there were 86.7 males.

The median income for a household in the village was $51,434 and the median income for a family was $57,632. Males had a median income of $37,857 versus $27,929 for females. The per capita income for the village was $19,851. About 6.1% of families and 5.7% of the population were below the poverty line, including 7.8% of those under age 18 and 3.9% of those age 65 or over.

== Education ==
- Freeburg Elementary School
- Freeburg Community High School
- St. Joseph Catholic School
- Public library

== Notable people ==
- Danny Cox, former pitcher for the St. Louis Cardinals
- Dutch Hoffman, outfielder for the Chicago White Sox

== In film ==
Jeanies, a now-demolished cafe on the northern outskirts of the town, was used for the filming of In the Heat of the Night.
