= Xcalibur (disambiguation) =

Xcalibur is a Canadian children's television series.

Xcalibur may also refer to:

- Xcalibur (ride), a spinning ride manufactured by Nauta Bussnik Baily
- Xcalibur (software), a Thermo mass spectrometry software
- Stylized spelling of Excalibur, the legendary sword of King Arthur
- Xcalibur, a film directed by Pierre Woodman
- Xcalibur, regional title of the South Korean musical production of Artus-Excalibur

== See also ==
- X-Calibre, a fictional superhero team in Marvel Comics
- Excalibur (disambiguation)
