= Colossus (Ferris wheel) =

Ferris wheel at Mid America Adventure

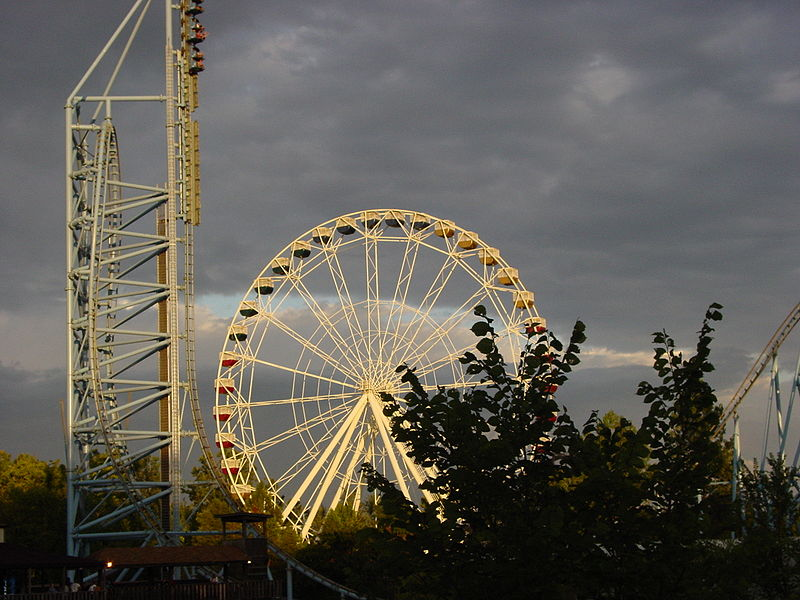
- Colossus

Mid America Adventure
- Area: 1904 World's Fair
- Coordinates: 38.5146403°N 90.6763834°W
- Status: Operating
- Opening date: April 18, 1986; 40 years ago
- Replaced: Pet-A-Pet

Ride statistics
- Manufacturer: Carousel Holland B.V.
- Model: Ferris wheel
- Height: 54.9 m (180 ft)
- Speed: 10 mph (16 km/h)
- Fast Lane available

Colossus is a 180-foot tall (54.9 m) Ferris wheel located at the 1904 World's Fair section of Mid America Adventure in Eureka, Missouri. It opened on April 18, 1986, and is 165 feet (50.3 m) in diameter, weighs 180 short tons (160 metric tons), and has a maximum capacity of 320 people.

The ride debuted at the 1984 New Orleans World's Fair, one of multiple rides at the fair that were operated by Six Flags. About three years after being at the fair, it was relocated to Mid America Adventure.

== History ==
=== 1984 New Orleans World's Fair ===
Colossus was originally debuted at the 1984 New Orleans World's Fair, under the name "Giant Wheel" in the Bayou Plaza area of the fairgrounds. It and the other rides there were operated by Six Flags, and it cost $2.50 per passenger to ride. It turned at a rate of 1½ revolutions per minute which equates to 10 mph (16.1 km/h). The ride first opened on May 19, 1984, a week after the rest of the fair, due to delays in assembly.

=== Mid America Adventure ===
Colossus stands where the Pet-A-Pet petting zoo used to be. It was removed in 1985 to make room for the addition of Colossus in the 1986 season.

In 1988, an animated Jack-o'-lantern face made up of orange lights, nicknamed "Jack", and a corresponding lighting program were installed on Colossus for the very first year of Fright Nights (now Fright Fest) at the park. While the lights stayed on the ride all-year afterwards, they were only used for the Halloween season. The light program returned every year until 2016, when it was removed.

In 1992, 2,200 lights were added to the ride for the main season, which displayed a 24-pattern performance with a starburst finale. During the months that the park was closed, they displayed a giant clock face which was visible to those passing on nearby Interstate 44.

== Incidents ==
On June 18, 2009, a power outage at the park stranded some guests on rides, forcing them to have to wait until they were manually released by park officials. Colossus was the most difficult ride to release riders from, because, with no power, it had to be manually cranked to get the passengers to the ground, which took about 75 minutes.
