= Spear of Destiny (disambiguation) =

Spear of Destiny may refer to:

- The Holy Lance, the spear reputedly used by a Roman centurion to pierce the side of the crucified Jesus
- The Spear Lúin, a spear named in Irish narratives professed to be one of the four treasures of the Tuatha Dé Danann
- The Spear of Destiny (book), a 1973 non-fiction book by Trevor Ravenscroft
- Spear of Destiny (band), a British rock band formed in 1983
- Spear of Destiny, a 1992 video game prequel to Wolfenstein 3D

== See also ==
- Sword of Destiny (disambiguation)
- Destiny (disambiguation)
