= Viper (Six Flags AstroWorld) =

Defunct roller coaster

- Previously known as Jet Scream at Six Flags St. Louis (1981–1988)
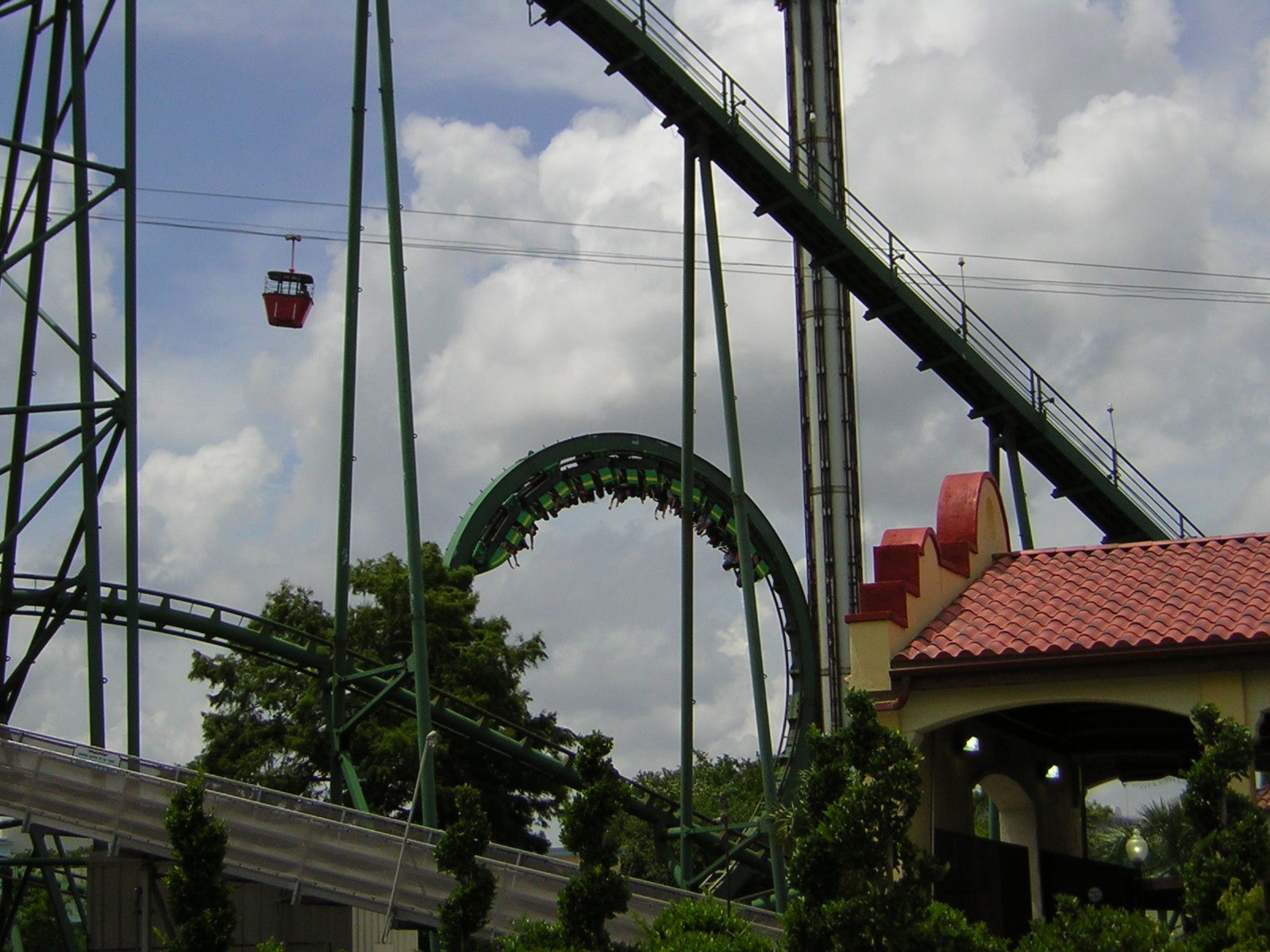

Six Flags AstroWorld
- Coordinates: 29.675650°N 95.406961°W
- Status: Removed
- Opening date: 1989
- Closing date: October 30, 2005

Six Flags St. Louis
- Coordinates: 38.513°N 90.673°W
- Status: Removed
- Opening date: April 4, 1981
- Closing date: 1988
- Replaced by: Ninja

General statistics
- Type: Steel
- Manufacturer: Anton Schwarzkopf
- Designer: Werner Stengel
- Model: Looping Star
- Track layout: Custom
- Lift/launch system: Chain lift hill
- Height: 80 ft (24 m)
- Length: 1,942 ft (592 m)
- Speed: 47.8 mph (76.9 km/h)
- Inversions: 1
- Capacity: 1700 riders per hour
- Height restriction: 42 in (107 cm)
- Viper at RCDB

Viper was a steel roller coaster located at Six Flags AstroWorld in Houston, Texas. Manufactured by Anton Schwarzkopf, the Looping Star model opened in 1989. It consisted of a single loop and was demolished with the closing of Six Flags AstroWorld on October 30, 2005. It had previously operated at Six Flags St. Louis (now named Mid America Adventure), where it was known as Jet Scream from 1981 to 1988.

An identical installation known as Silver Bullet still operates at Frontier City in Oklahoma City, Oklahoma. Its paint scheme is different and the tunnel on the Silver Bullet surrounds the final turn as opposed to the drop hill.

== History ==
On April 4, 1981, Jet Scream officially opened at Six Flags St. Louis. It was the park's first roller coaster to go upside down.

Jet Scream was dismantled after the 1988 season. It was sent to Six Flags AstroWorld where it was renamed Viper. The ride opened to the public in the spring of 1989.

During its run at Six Flags AstroWorld, it featured a tunnel surrounding the first drop. The exterior had a dragon mural.

On September 12, 2005, Six Flags announced the closure of the AstroWorld theme park. Viper would operate for the last time on October 30 along with the park.
