= Xcalibur (ride) =

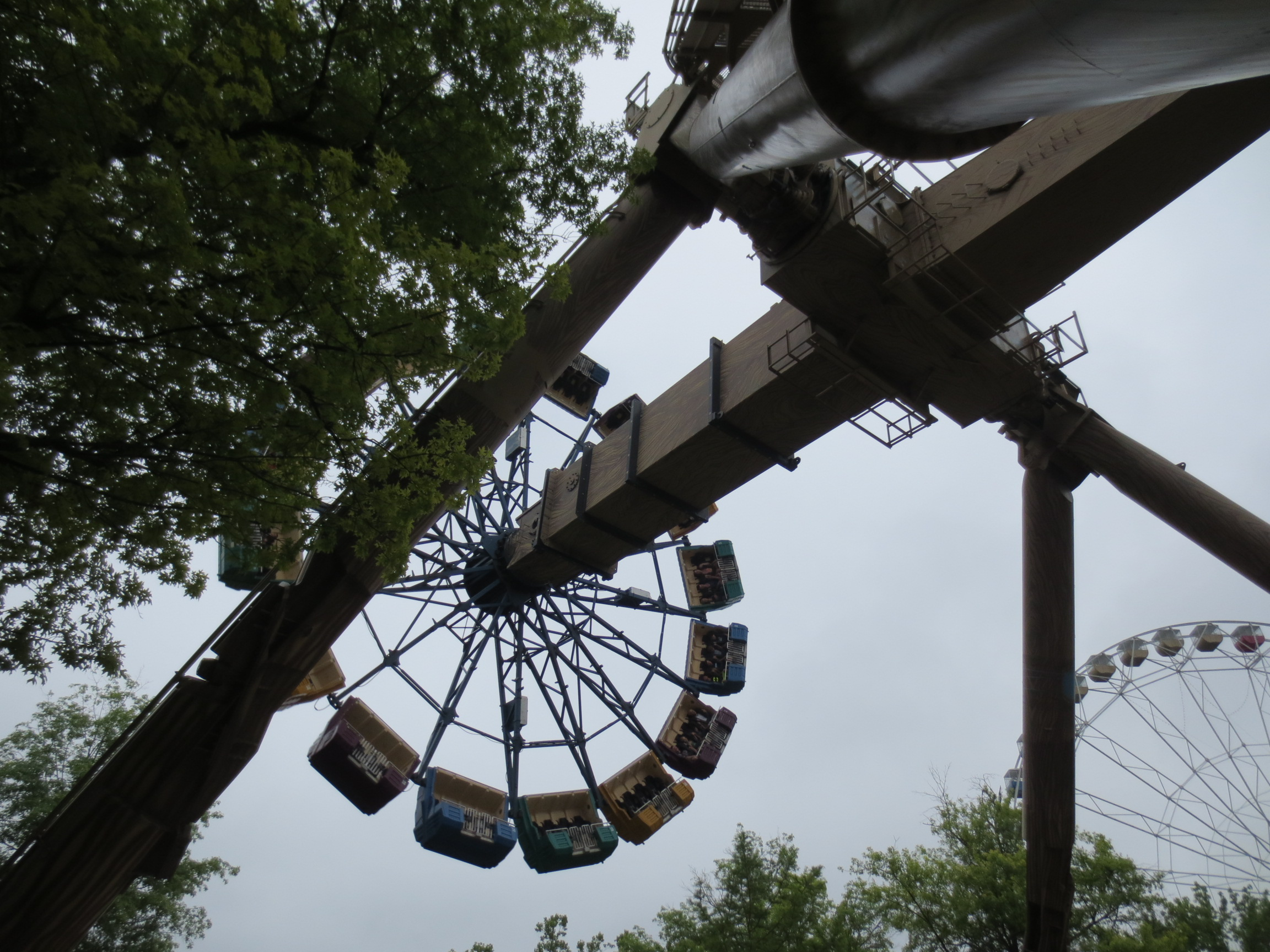

Six Flags St. Louis
- Area: Britannia
- Status: Removed
- Opening date: 2003
- Closing date: 2022

Six Flags Great Adventure
- Area: Fantasy Forest
- Status: Relocated to Six Flags St. Louis
- Opening date: 1999
- Closing date: 2002
- Replaced: Fantasy Fling
- Replaced by: Fender Benders

Ride statistics
- Manufacturer: Nauta Bussink Baily
- Model: Evolution
- Height: 113 ft (34 m)
- Vehicles: 16
- Riders per vehicle: 4
- Height restriction: 54 in (137 cm)

Xcalibur was a spinning thrill ride located in Britannia at Six Flags St. Louis (now named Mid America Adventure) in Eureka, Missouri. The ride was manufactured by Ronald Bussink, and opened in the spring of 2003.

== History ==
Xcalibur was built in 1992 and debuted at the 1992 Munich Oktoberfest as Evolution. Evolution traveled across Europe until 1998 when it was purchased by Six Flags.

=== Six Flags Great Adventure (1999-2002) ===
Xcalibur was announced at Six Flags Great Adventure as Evolution, for the 1999 season along with 24 other attractions, known as War on Lines. Evolution was supposed to be built in Movietown but later the ride was built where Fantasy Fling was located in the Fantasy Forest section of the park. Before it opened the ride went through rigorous testings and state inspections. Since Evolution opened the ride faced multiple problems with operations on the control panel that few can operate. Just after four seasons at the park Evolution was removed and relocated to Six Flags St. Louis. Fender Benders (bumper cars) was constructed at the former site of Evolution and opened in Summer 2012.

=== Six Flags St. Louis (2003-2022) ===
Xcalibur concept art in 2003

Evolution was relocated to Six Flags St. Louis and opened at the Missouri park in Spring 2003 as Xcalibur. During the relocation Xcalibur received a better control panel than before and enhanced Medieval theme elements. Also each of the 16 gondolas received a sound system where the ride operator can talk during the ride and play theme music.

Xcalibur was closed for the 2018 season for an extensive refurbishment reopening for the 2020 season.

The ride was removed during the 2023 offseason.

== Ride ==
Unlike Pirate ship rides that let gravity control the ride, Xcalibur motion was controlled. Xcalibur's speed and direction was determined by servos located in the hub of the ride at the top of the leg supports. Xcalibur was manufactured by Nauta Bussink & Baily. The spinning ride was 113 feet (34 m) tall. It had 16 gondolas and could carry 64 people per ride.
