= Grand Ole Carousel =

Carousel at Mid America Adventure

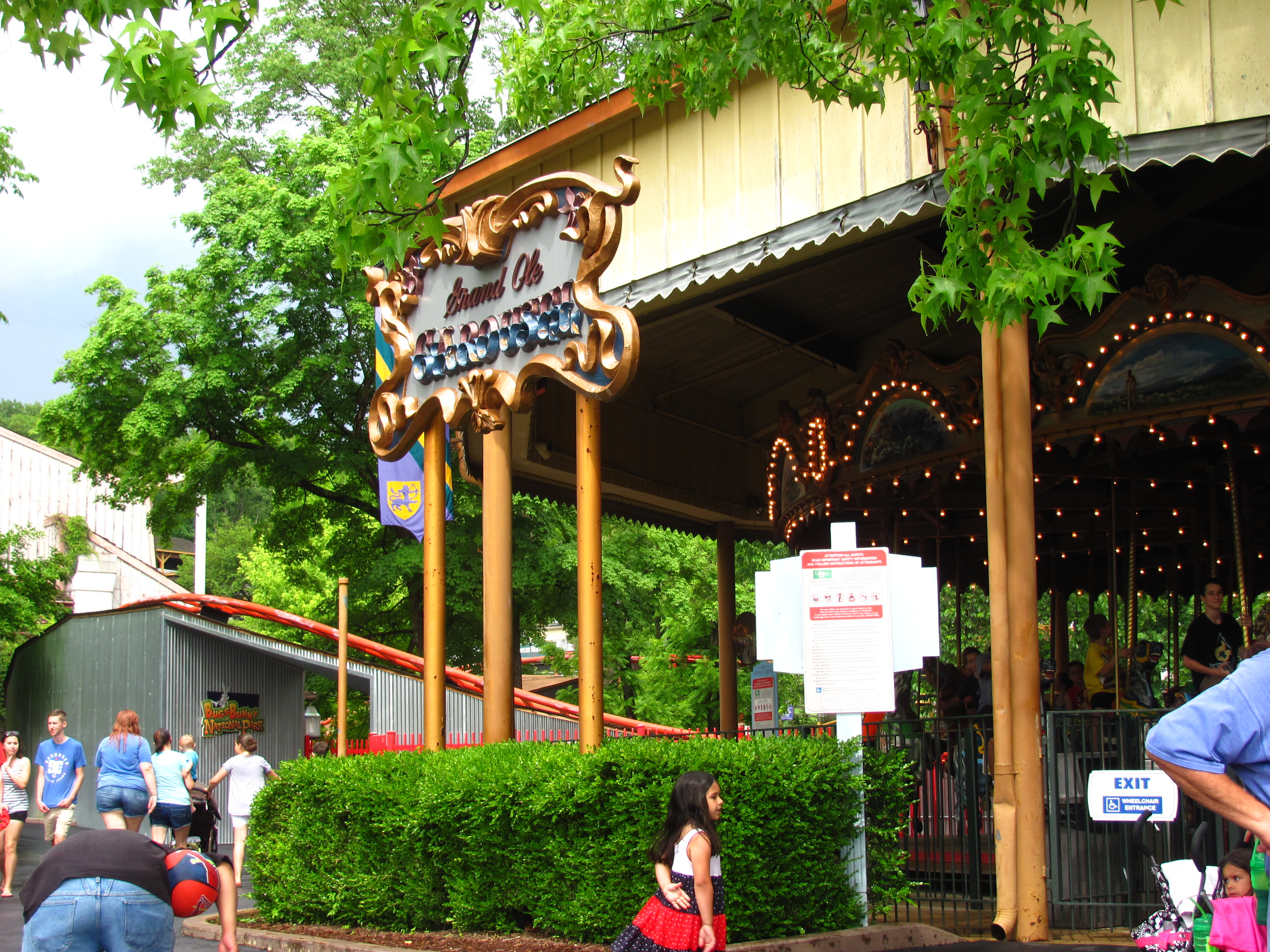

Mid America Adventure
- Area: Britannia
- Coordinates: 38.5146403°N 90.6763834°W
- Status: Operating
- Opening date: 1972; 54 years ago

Ride statistics
- Manufacturer: Philadelphia Toboggan Coasters
- Model: Carousel #35

The Grand Ole Carousel is a carousel at Mid America Adventure. It opened in 1972, and was originally manufactured by Philadelphia Toboggan Coasters in 1915. The Carousel was originally installed at Luna Park in Cleveland, Ohio.
