= Mr. Freeze (roller coaster) =

Roller coasters in Texas and Missouri

- Previously known as Mr. Freeze (1998–2012); Mr. Freeze Reverse Blast (2012–2023)

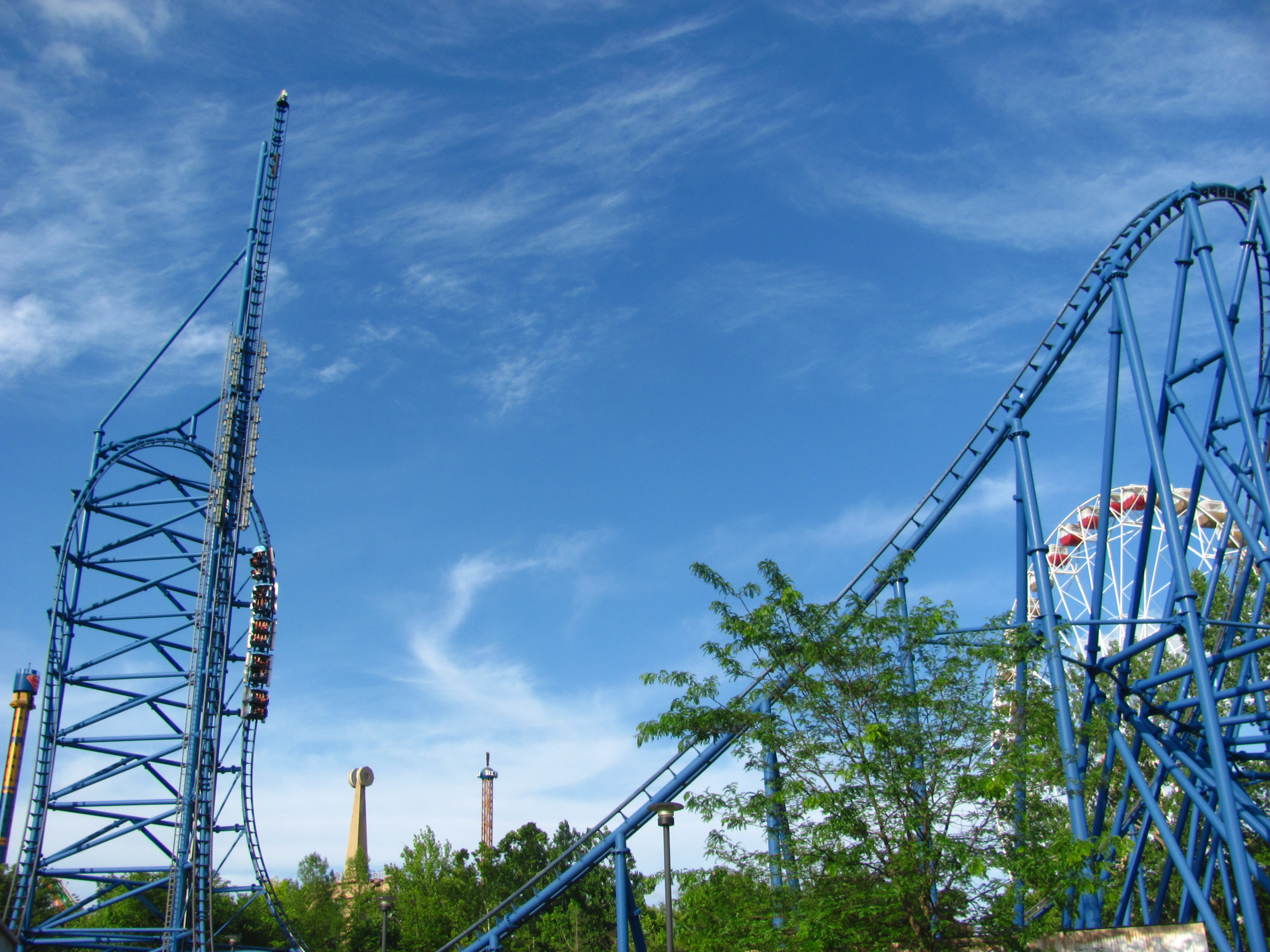
- Mr. Freeze: Reverse Blast at Mid America Adventure

Six Flags Over Texas
- Park section: Gotham City
- Coordinates: 32°45′28″N 97°04′03″W
- Status: Operating
- Soft opening date: March 24, 1998
- Opening date: March 28, 1998

Mid America Adventure
- Park section: DC Comics Plaza
- Coordinates: 38°30′53″N 90°40′39″W
- Status: Operating
- Opening date: April 10, 1998
- Cost: $10 million

General statistics
- Type: Steel – Launched – Shuttle
- Manufacturer: Premier Rides
- Designer: Werner Stengel
- Model: LIM Shuttle Loop Coaster
- Lift/launch system: Linear induction motors
- Height: 218 ft (66 m)
- Drop: 194 ft (59 m)
- Length: 1,300 ft (400 m)
- Speed: 70 mph (110 km/h)
- Inversions: 1 (traversed twice)
- Max vertical angle: 90°
- Acceleration: 0 to 70 mph (0 to 113 km/h) in 3.8 seconds
- G-force: 4
- Height restriction: 54 in (137 cm)
- Trains: 2 trains with 5 cars; riders arranged 2 across in 2 rows for a total of 20 riders per train
- Fast Lane available
- Mr. Freeze at RCDB

Mr. Freeze is a launched shuttle roller coaster located at Six Flags Over Texas in Arlington, Texas, with another installation known as Mr. Freeze: Reverse Blast at Mid America Adventure in Eureka, Missouri. The steel coasters feature a linear induction motor (LIM) launch system that accelerate riders from 0–70 mph (0–113 km/h) in 3.8 seconds. The two installations are mirror images of one another and are themed to the famous Batman villain Mr. Freeze. Originally, they were themed after the 1997 film Batman & Robin prior to a conversion in 2012 to operate backward. The Over Texas version returned to forward operation in 2022, but in July 2023, it started operating with one train launching backward and one train launching forward to offer different experiences.

== History ==
=== Mr. Freeze (1998–2011; 2022-present) ===
On December 18, 1996, Six Flags Over Texas announced that Mr. Freeze would be added to the park. Premier Rides was hired to build a new shuttle coaster that would be powered by a linear induction motor (LIM). It was billed as the tallest and fastest roller coaster in Texas. In addition, Mr. Freeze would be the second highest attraction at Six Flags Over Texas after the park's Oil Derrick observation tower. Just a month later in January 1997, it was confirmed that Six Flags St. Louis would be receiving a mirror clone of the ride. The coaster would be placed in the center of the park. This would cause the park's Spain section to be renamed DC Comics Plaza.

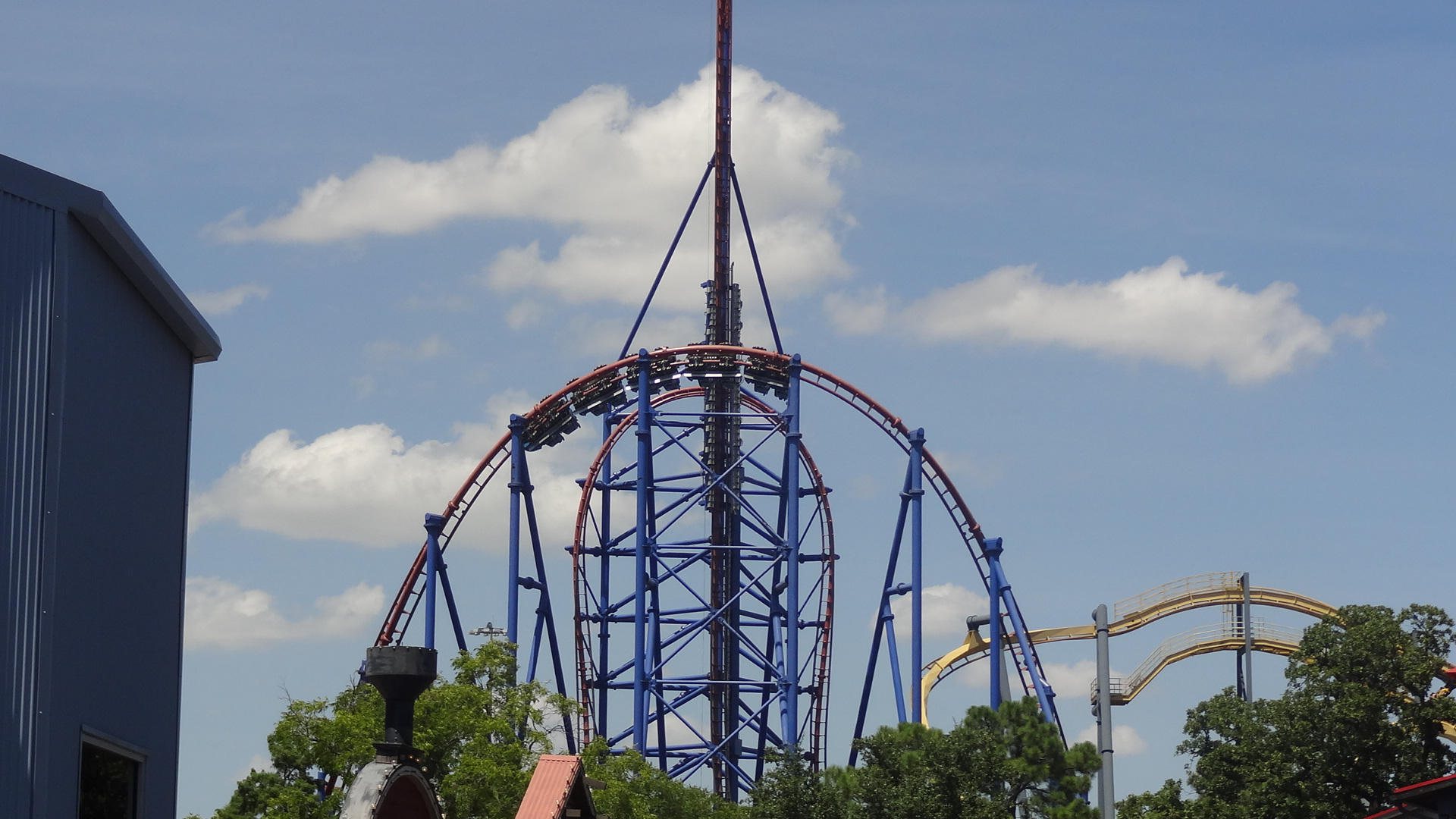
Mr. Freeze: Reverse Blast at Six Flags Over Texas

Mr. Freeze was planned to open in May 1997 to coincide with the release of Batman & Robin. Arnold Schwarzenegger and George Clooney were scheduled to appear at the opening of Gotham City at Six Flags Over Texas and be the first to ride it, but problems with the launch system delayed its opening to 1998. During testing, the LIM motors had issues with overheating and Six Flags officials could not provide the full thrust necessary to operate the ride consistently at high speeds. Park management wasn't concerned, as Flight of Fear at Kings Island and Kings Dominion also had issues with the launch system. The Over Texas location was originally located in the Goodtimes Square section of the park. When Batman: The Ride debuted in 1999, the surrounding area was renamed Gotham City. On October 3, 2000, the ride closed due to an issue with one of the trains.

When it first opened, Mr. Freeze used over-the-shoulder restraints (commonly called OTSRs), which were replaced with individual ratcheting lap bars in 2002 at both locations.

In June 2006, all Premier Rides' LIM roller coasters were closed as they underwent emergency inspection after an accident on the now-defunct Batman & Robin: The Chiller where a wheel fell off on the lowest part of the track. This problem apparently existed on all of Premier Rides' coasters with booster LIMs. New wheels and bearings were ordered and replaced.

Both roller coasters were originally painted in light blue. The Texas Mr. Freeze received a new paint job that was completed in 2007; the track was repainted red and the supports blue. In 2021, the ride was repainted in light blue. For 2009, the St. Louis Mr. Freeze was repainted with dark blue track and supports.

=== Mr. Freeze: Reverse Blast (2012–2022) ===
On March 22, 2012, Six Flags announced that both versions of Mr. Freeze roller coasters at Six Flags Over Texas and Six Flags St. Louis would feature backwards facing trains and be renamed Mr. Freeze: Reverse Blast. The St. Louis version reopened on May 5, 2012, with the help of David Freese (then a St. Louis Cardinals baseball player). The attraction at Six Flags Over Texas reopened on May 12, 2012. Vanilla Ice performed a concert at the opening.

On August 29, 2022, Six Flags Over Texas had announced a closing date for Mr. Freeze: Reverse Blast, slated for September 11, 2022 in an internal event. Despite this date announcement, the park clarified that the ride would be staying, but teased that the ride would be refurbished. On September 23, 2022, Six Flags Over Texas announced that the original version of Mr. Freeze would return, with trains moving forward again.

== Characteristics ==
Unlike most other shuttle roller coasters, Mr. Freeze is able to simultaneously operate two five-car (20 passengers total) trains because of an innovative sliding platform in the station. One train loads and unloads on either the right or left side of the station while the other train is launched out onto the main track. The station track has blower fans that cool down the aluminum plates that engage with the LIMs. When this train returns to the station, it slides to the unused side of the room and unloads as the other train slides to the middle and launches. These trains are launched by 116 linear induction motors that help them achieve a top speed of 70 mph (110 km/h) in 3.8 seconds. The main launch requires 2.4 megawatts (5,000 amps x 480 volts) of electric power for three seconds to propel a single train.

== Ride experience ==
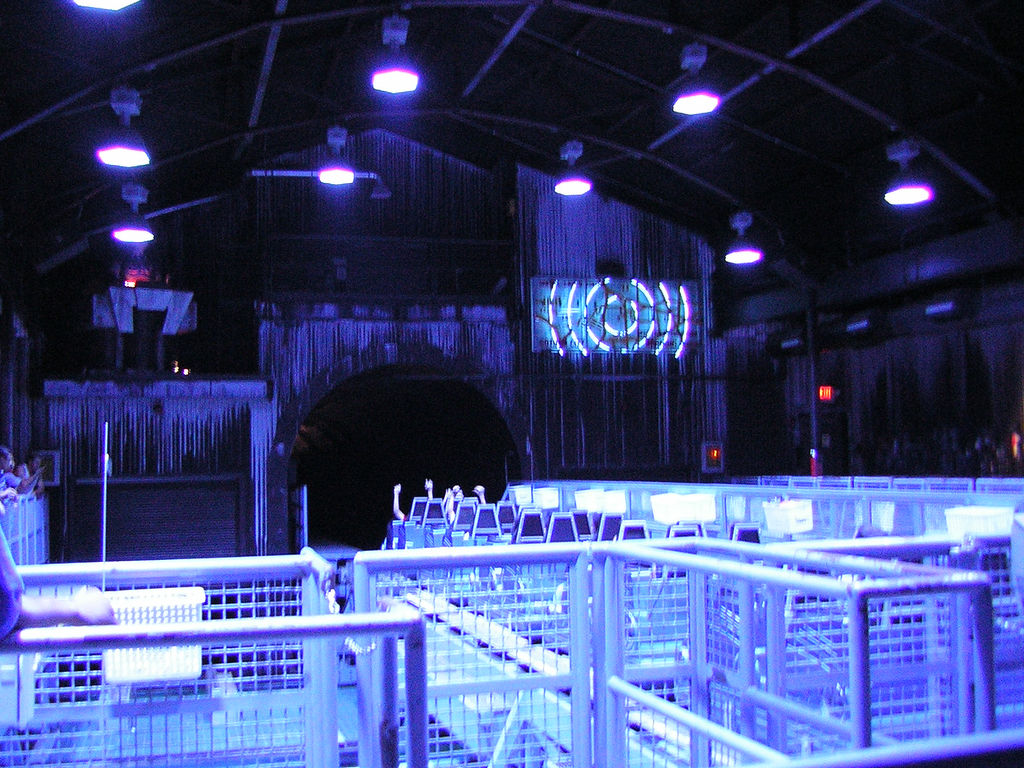
The station of Mr. Freeze at Six Flags Over Texas

Based on the 1997 film Batman & Robin, riders enter an old, abandoned ice cream factory that has now become the hideout of Mr. Freeze.

=== Queue ===
==== Six Flags Over Texas ====
At Six Flags Over Texas, guests walk into Snowy's Cones by passing under the mouth. Inside the factory, guests make a left turn and start on the lower level, where they approach some paths. In the center, there is a mixer and four flavor containers. These containers are vanilla, chocolate, strawberry and orange. Guests turn right and pass through a hallway with spray paint walls. An outdoor section of the queue can be found in this hallway. This area features switchbacks that run next to the Six Flags & Texas Railroad train tracks. Guests go up some ramps and navigate through the upper level. Along the way, there is a sign that says Home Of The Big Freeze. Now on the upper level, guests can get views of the lower level, the mixer and the flavor containers. Guests then head into the station, where they board the ride.

==== Mid America Adventure ====
The version at Mid America Adventure features a different queue line which takes place outside. Guests pass underneath the mouth to Snowy's Ice Cream Factory Tours, where they make a right-handed curve followed by a left-handed curve. These curves lead to a straight path and some small ramps. After making a left turn, guests walk down a long pathway where they can get views of the ride. Guests turn right and cross a bridge over the Thunder River rapids ride. Following the bridge, guests go down a curved ramp. Then, guests enter an area with switchbacks and a few passages. Several curved paths lead to a straight section of the pathway followed by a left turn. As guests get closer to the factory, there is a bulletin board with news and advertisements. After a right turn, guests enter the factory where they navigate through a hallway. Guests then climb the staircase and enter the loading station where they are greeted by Mr. Freeze (who is positioned toward the top of the exit.)

=== Layout ===
The ride begins when the train slides onto the main launch. Soon afterwards, an alarm is sounded and riders are boosted through a 190-foot (58 m) tunnel and up into a 150-foot (46 m)-tall inside top hat that flips riders completely upside-down. This element is followed by a 113-foot (34 m) overbanked turn that banks riders at a 140-degree angle and a vertical spike. As the train climbs this spike and slows, it is gently pushed up almost all the way to the top by another set of LIMs. The train then freefalls down the tower back through the course.

== Records ==
When Mr. Freeze opened in 1998, it was the longest, fourth tallest, and second fastest shuttle coaster. In 2000, the records were taken by Speed – The Ride at the NASCAR Café at the Sahara Hotel and Casino in Las Vegas, Nevada. After the casino closed in 2011, Mr. Freeze continued to hold the records as the longest shuttle coaster until 2019. Mr. Freeze also opened as the third tallest launched coaster with a top height of 218 feet (66 m), as well as the second fastest launched coaster with a top speed of 70 mph (110 km/h). Its speed was matched by Volcano: The Blast Coaster at Kings Dominion that same year, Speed – The Ride and Superman: Ultimate Escape at Geauga Lake in 2000. In March 2001, Hypersonic XLC took the record as the second fastest launched coaster.

The ride at Mid America Adventure holds the record for the tallest coaster in Missouri, but the record for being the state's fastest coaster was taken by Mamba at Worlds of Fun shortly after opening. As for the Over Texas location, it held the record for the tallest and fastest coaster in Texas for three years, before it was taken by Titan. Mr. Freeze is currently the state's second tallest and second fastest coaster, with its speed matched by Superman: Krypton Coaster and Iron Rattler at Six Flags Fiesta Texas, which both reach 70 mph.

== Incidents ==
On April 10, 2022, about 15 minutes before the park's closure for the night, an electrical motor in the launch track had malfunctioned and caught fire on the Over Texas version of the ride. Seven people (Including one Six Flags employee) were hospitalized with caution of smoke inhalation as the building was quickly filled with smoke. About 4 weeks after the fire, the ride reopened operating one train.

== Rankings ==
Golden Ticket Awards: Top steel Roller Coasters
Year									1998	1999
Ranking									23 (tie)	–
Year	2000	2001	2002	2003	2004	2005	2006	2007	2008	2009
Ranking	–	–	41	30	–	–	–	–	–	–
Year	2010	2011	2012	2013	2014	2015	2016	2017	2018	2019
Ranking	–	–	–	–	–	–	–	–	–	–
Year	2020	2021	2022	2023	2024	2025	2026			
Ranking	N/A	–	–	–	–	–	–			
