= Mid America Adventure =

Theme park in Eureka, Missouri

Mid America Adventure by Enchanted Parks
- Previously known as Six Flags Over Mid-America (1971–1997); Six Flags St. Louis (1997–2026)
- Logo used since 2026

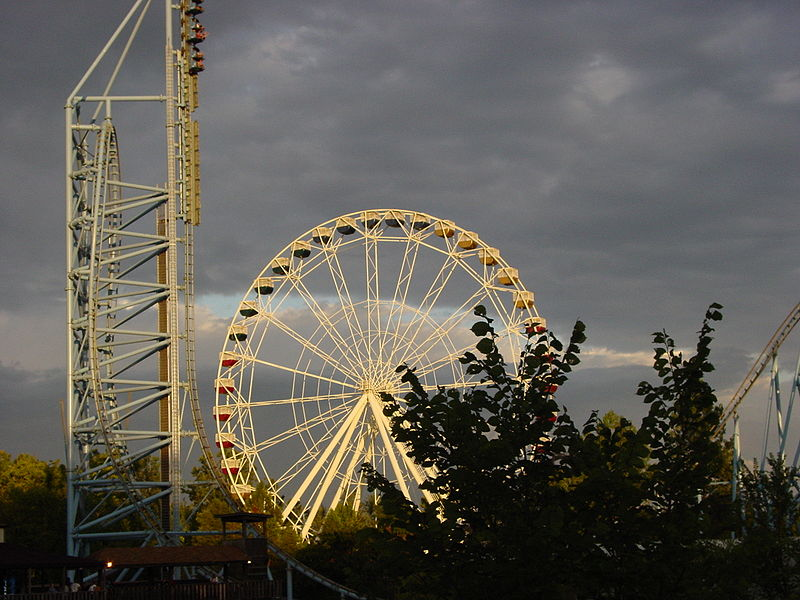
- Mr. Freeze: Reverse Blast and Colossus
- Interactive map of Mid America Adventure by Enchanted Parks
- Location: Eureka, Missouri, United States
- Coordinates: 38.514°N 90.676°W
- Status: Operating
- Opened: June 5, 1971; 55 years ago
- Owner: EPR Properties
- Former owners: Six Flags (1971–2026)
- Operated by: Enchanted Parks
- General manager: Danny Snider
- Slogan: Gateway to Thrills
- Operating season: April to November
- Area: 323 acres (1.31 km^{2})

Attractions
- Total: 33 as of 2026
- Roller coasters: 10
- Website: midamericaadventure.enchantedparks.com

Mid America Adventure by Enchanted Parks, formerly known as Six Flags Over Mid-America and Six Flags St. Louis, is an amusement park in Eureka, Missouri, a suburb of St. Louis. Founded in 1971 by Six Flags, the park was purchased in 2026 by EPR Properties, which hired Enchanted Parks to operate it.

The park was conceived in the 1960s by Six Flags founder Angus G. Wynne. Unlike his company's first two parks, it was not designed by architect Randall Duell, who was busy designing AstroWorld, but by the company itself. The park opened on June 5, 1971. It has undergone many changes, including a 1990s revamp that added two new areas and replaced or renamed all six of the park's original ones.

Mid America Adventure operates from April to November. In the fall, the park hosts the Halloween-themed event Fright Fest.

== History ==
Plans for a Six Flags park in the St. Louis area—dubbed Six Flags Over Mid-America—were announced on July 16, 1969. The park opened on June 5, 1971, the third and last of the three "true" Six Flags parks envisioned by Angus G. Wynne. The park was divided into six themed sections, each under one of the "Six Flags":

- Missouri (now 1904 World's Fair), the main entry of the park, themed after the St. Louis World's Fair of 1904.
- U.S.A. (replaced by Time Warner Studios in 1995), in the southeast of the park, themed after the United States.
- France (now Chouteau's Market), to the east next to U.S.A., themed after a colonial French trading post.
- Spain (replaced by DC Comics Plaza in 1997), in the southwest of the park, featuring Spanish-themed architecture and restaurants.
- England (now Britannia), in the northwest of the park, originally themed after colonial British influence. Later themed to a village in medieval England.
- Illinois, in the north section of the park, originally themed to the state of the same name. Later partially replaced by Bugs Bunny National Park, with the Old Chicago sub-section beyond the train loop becoming the entirety of the area.

The Mall of the Mid-Americas dedication plaque says:

Six Flags is divided into six sections which reflect the architecture and atmosphere of different eras in Midwestern history. The flags of France, Spain, England, the Union, Illinois, and Missouri have had influence over the territory since 1764. The buildings, shows, and rides are themed to help you relive the bright and colorful past at Six Flags.

The park's name was changed to Six Flags St. Louis for the 1997 season. On June 5, 1999, the 12-acre Six Flags Hurricane Harbor water park opened next to the main park, a $17 million expansion that was the largest in the park's history.

In 2014, Six Flags sold 180 acres of unused land to the east of the park to developer McBride & Sons, reducing its property area to 323 acres: including 40 acres of undeveloped land.

In January 2020, a renovation to the entry plaza removed the original ticket booths. That March, Six Flags St. Louis announced that the opening of their 2020 season would be delayed by to the COVID-19 pandemic.

Yearly attendance figures have not been released.

=== 2026 sale and renaming to Mid America Adventure ===
On March 5, 2026, the park's owner, Six Flags (which had merged with Cedar Fair in 2024), announced that it would sell Six Flags St. Louis, Worlds of Fun, Great Escape, Michigan's Adventure, Valleyfair, and two other park properties to EPR Properties. The sale was completed on April 6, 2026. EPR hired Enchanted Parks to operate the park. The park was originally intended to retain the Six Flags branding through the 2026 season, however it would be officially renamed to Mid America Adventure on August 27, 2026, marked by the removal of the Six Flags St. Louis entrance sign, and the installation of the new logo signage at the arch. The remaining Six Flags signs would be retained until 2027; it is expected that the DC Comics and Looney Tunes IP licenses will also be removed, Six Flags Fright Fest at Mid America Adventure will be renamed for the 2027 season with the official removal of the DC Comics and Looney Tunes IP licenses from the park along with Great Escape by Enchanted Parks, along with the rebrand of Hurricane Harbor St. Louis as the license of Six Flags is officially expired.

== Areas and attractions ==
Mid America Adventure is divided into eight themed sections, all of which were added after the park's opening or renamed. The park is laid out in a "Duell loop", a design concept that was often used by park designer Randall Duell.

=== 1904 World's Fair ===
1904 World's Fair is the main area of the park, named after the Louisiana Purchase Exposition in St. Louis, which ran from April 30 to December 1, 1904. The area features the "Mall of the Mid-Americas", a shopping mall that features foods introduced or served at the fair, as well as early-1900s-themed buildings. The area was named "Missouri" until 1994.

Ride	Picture	Year opened	Manufacturer	Description
American Thunder		2008	Great Coasters International	A classically themed wooden roller coaster. It was named "Evel Kinevel" until 2010, after the daredevil of the same name.
Colossus		1986	Carousel Holland B.V.	A tall ferris wheel, around 180 feet in height.
The Log Flume		1971	Arrow Development	A log flume.
Tommy G. Robertson Railroad		1971	Crown Metal Products	Train ride.

=== Gateway to the West ===
Gateway to the West is themed after the old colonial times of the state of Missouri, and alludes to locales and people that have lived in the state. The area opened in 1993, taking over a part of what was formerly the Illinois section of the park.

Ride	Picture	Year opened	Manufacturer	Description
River King Mine Train		1971	Arrow Dynamics	A steel roller coaster named after the River King Coal Mine.
Thunder River		1983	Intamin	A river rapids ride that circles the island that Mr. Freeze was built on.

=== Chouteau's Market ===
Chouteau's Market is themed after a French market along the Mississippi River. It is named after Auguste Chouteau, the founder of the city of St. Louis. The area opened in 1993, replacing France. In 2014, the area was expanded to take over a piece of what had formerly been the back of Studio Backlot.

Ride	Picture	Year opened	Manufacturer	Description
Spinsanity		2017	Zamperla	A Zamperla Disk'O ride.

=== Studio Backlot ===
Studio Backlot is themed to the backlot of a movie studio in Hollywood. The area originally opened in 1995 as "Time Warner Studios", but was renamed "Warner Bros. Backlot" the following year.

In the first couple years, the area featured five interactive movie set experiences based on various Warner Bros. films, including Bonnie and Clyde, Little Shop of Horrors and Maverick, all of which were retired after the 1997 season. The area's name was changed again to its current name in 2002, though it mostly retains its previous theme.

Ride	Picture	Year opened	Manufacturer	Description
Batman: The Ride		1995	Bolliger & Mabillard	An inverted roller coaster based on after Batman from DC Comics. Guests walk through an extensive queue themed after Gotham City.
Ninja		1989	Arrow Dynamics/Vekoma	A steel roller coaster themed after the Ninja of feudal Japan. Originally located at Expo 86 in Vancouver.
The Buccaneer		1980	Intamin	A swinging ship ride. Originally called The Buccaneer (1980-1994), it was then re-themed to the Joker from DC Comics from 1995 to 2023 before returning to its original name.

=== DC Comics Plaza ===
DC Comics Plaza celebrates the worlds of DC Entertainment, with several attractions based on various DC characters and properties. The area opened in 1997, replacing the former Spain section of the park.

Ride	Picture	Year opened	Manufacturer	Description
Mr. Freeze: Reverse Blast		1998	Premier Rides	A launched roller coaster themed after Mr. Freeze and the 1997 movie Batman & Robin. Its trains originally ran facing forwards, but were changed in 2012 to run facing backwards, coinciding with its name change adding "Reverse Blast" to the title. The shoulder restraints were replaced with lap bars after the 2001 season.
Shazam!		1971	Eli Bridge Company	A standard scrambler ride themed after the super hero Shazam.

=== Britannia ===
Britannia is based on the country of Great Britain as it was in its medieval period, including elements from Arthurian legend. The area was named "England" from 1971 to 1992, then "Great Britain" in 1993, and it was given its current name in 1994.

Ride	Picture	Year opened	Manufacturer	Description
Grand Ole Carousel		1972	Philadelphia Toboggan Coasters	A traditional carousel that was originally named "Carousel" from 1972 to 1983. It was also named "Grand Ole Carousel" from 1984 to 1993 and "Enchanted Carousel" from 1994 to 1997. In 1998, its name was reverted back to Grand Ole Carousel. The ride underwent a multi-year refurbishment which began in 2021, and re-opened in July of 2025.
Joker Carnival of Chaos		2024	Zamperla	A Pendulum ride.
Pandemonium		2007	Gerstlauer	A spinning roller coaster, the third of four installations at Six Flags theme parks. It was formerly named "Tony Hawk's Big Spin" from 2007 to 2011. Despite its location right inside the entrance of Britannia, the ride has no thematic connection to the rest of the area.
Rookie Racer		2023	Vekoma	A kids' roller coaster.
Supergirl: Sky Flyer		2019	Zamperla	Zamperla Endeavour model, themed after Supergirl.
The Boss		2000	Custom Coasters International	A wooden terrain roller coaster, the tallest and fastest coaster built by Custom Coasters International. It was the eighth longest wooden roller coaster in the world when it first opened, with a track length of 5,051 feet. The helix element was removed for the 2018 season, reducing the track's length to 4,631 feet. During the 2025 pre-season, 215 feet of track was replaced with Titan Track, allowing for a smoother ride experience.

=== Illinois ===
Illinois is loosely themed to the city of Chicago. The area was formerly known as "Old Chicago" from 1971 to 1993.

Ride	Picture	Year opened	Manufacturer	Description
Boomerang		2013	Vekoma	A boomerang roller coaster. It was relocated from Six Flags Over Texas, where it operated as Flashback.
Catwoman Whip		2022	Funtime	Funtime Booster model, themed after Catwoman. The ride was supposed to open in 2020, but was originally delayed to 2021 due to the COVID-19 pandemic. The ride was pushed back again for the 2022 season to replace Superman Tower of Power.
Fireball		2016	Larson International	A "Super Loop" ride.
Screamin' Eagle		1976	Philadelphia Toboggan Coasters	A wooden roller coaster designed by John C. Allen. When it opened in 1976, it was the tallest, longest and fastest wooden roller coaster in the world. An American Coaster Enthusiasts landmark.
SkyScreamer		2011	Funtime	A Star Flyer. Was the first SkyScreamer to open throughout the Six Flags parks.

=== Bugs Bunny National Park ===
Bugs Bunny National Park is a kiddie area based on the Looney Tunes franchise. It opened in 2006 as the successor to Looney Tunes Town. It replaced some former land that the Gateway to the West section used to occupy.

Ride	Picture	Year opened	Manufacturer	Description
Bugs Bunny Fort Fun		2006	SVC Interactive	A play area and treehouse area themed after Looney Tunes.
Bugs Bunny Ranger Pilots		2006	Chance Rides	A "Red Baron" kiddie biplane ride featuring Bugs Bunny. It was originally located in Goodtime Hollow and later Looney Tunes Town and was then relocated.
Daffy Duck Stars on Parade		2006	Zamperla	A swing ride featuring Daffy Duck. The ride was moved from its old "Fairgrounds"/Looney Tunes Town location for the construction of Evel Knievel to the former Daffy Duck Duccaneer location in 2008.
Elmer Fudd Weather Balloons		2006	Zamperla	A "samba balloons" ride themed after Elmer Fudd.
Foghorn Leghorn National Park Railway		2006	Zamperla	A kiddie railroad ride named after Foghorn Leghorn. It was relocated from Looney Tunes Town, where it was known as "Looney Tooter".
Marvin The Martian Camp Invasion		2006	Zamperla	A "Crazy Sub" spaceship-themed kiddie ride themed after Marvin the Martian.
Taz Twisters		2006	Zamperla	A mini teacups ride named after Taz.
Tweety Tweet House		2006	Zamperla	A "Jumpin' Star" kiddie drop tower ride themed after Sylvester and Tweety.
Yosemite Sam Tugboat Tailspin		2006	Zamperla	A "Rockin' Tug" spinning ship ride themed after Yosemite Sam.

=== Roller Coasters ===
Ride name	Picture	Year opened	Manufacturer	Current location	Description
American Thunder		2008	Great Coasters International	1904 World's Fair	A classically themed wooden roller coaster. It was named "Evel Kinevel" until 2010, after the daredevil of the same name.
River King Mine Train		1971	Arrow Dynamics	Gateway to the West	A steel roller coaster named after the River King Coal Mine. It is the oldest operating permanent coaster in the state of Missouri.
Batman: The Ride		1995	Bolliger & Mabillard	Studio Backlot	An inverted roller coaster based on Batman from DC Comics. Guests walk through an extensive queue themed after Gotham City.
Ninja		1989	Arrow Dynamics/Vekoma	Studio Backlot	A steel roller coaster themed after the Ninja of feudal Japan.
Mr. Freeze: Reverse Blast		1998	Premier Rides	DC Comics Plaza	A launched roller coaster themed after Mr. Freeze and the 1997 movie Batman & Robin. Its trains originally ran facing forward, but were changed in 2012 to run facing backward, coinciding with its name change adding "Reverse Blast" to the title. The shoulder restraints were replaced with lap bars after the 2001 season.
The Boss		2000	Custom Coasters International	Britannia	A wooden terrain roller coaster, the tallest and fastest coaster built by Custom Coasters International. It was the eighth longest wooden roller coaster in the world when it first opened, with a track length of 5,051 feet. The helix element was removed for the 2018 season, reducing the track's length to 4,631 feet.
Pandemonium		2007	Gerstlauer	Britannia	A spinning roller coaster, the third of four installations at Six Flags theme parks. It was formerly named "Tony Hawk's Big Spin" from 2007 to 2011.
Screamin' Eagle		1976	Philadelphia Toboggan Coasters	Illinois	A wooden roller coaster designed by John C. Allen. When it opened in 1976, it was the tallest, longest and fastest wooden roller coaster in the world at 110 feet (34 m) high and 62 mph (100 km/h). An American Coaster Enthusiasts landmark.
Boomerang		2013	Vekoma	Illinois	A boomerang roller coaster. It was relocated from Six Flags Over Texas, where it operated as Flashback from 1989 to 2012.
Rookie Racer		2023	Vekoma	Britannia	A junior roller coaster themed to Formula One racing.

== Hurricane Harbor ==
Hurricane Harbor St. Louis
- Interactive map of Hurricane Harbor St. Louis
- Theme: A washed-up harbor that once resided in the South Seas.
- Owner: EPR Properties
- Operated by: Enchanted Parks
- Opened: June 5, 1999; 27 years ago

Hurricane Harbor is a water park that is connected to the southeast portion of Mid America Adventure and is adjacent to Studio Backlot, but is not part of the main park.

It was announced on social media that Hurricane Harbor St. Louis is getting a new name for the summer 2027 season to retire the Six Flags Hurricane Harbor brand name when the licensing deal with Six Flags expires.

Slide/Attraction Name	Year Opened	Manufacturer/Ride Type	Other notes
Big Kahuna	1999	Proslide Technology Inc. Mammoth	Family raft ride.
Tube Slides	1999	Proslide Technology Inc. Pipeline	Piranha (red) & Stingray (yellow) - partially enclosed, Hammerhead (green) & Man-O-War (teal) - completely enclosed.
Adventure Cove	2022	SCS Interactive Discovery Treehouse	Family activity area, with Proslide Technology Inc. Twisters’ Zone slides. New play structure, renamed "Adventure Cove" opened in 2022.
Hurricane Bay	1999	Aquatic Development Group Inc. WaveTek wave pool	Wave pool with a "volcano" at one end and a beach at the other
Gulley Washer Creek	1999	Aquatic Development Group Inc. lazy river	Lazy river
Tornado	2005	Proslide Technology Inc. Tornado “60”	Funnel slide that uses four person “cloverleaf” tubes.
Wahoo Racer	2009	Proslide Technology Inc. 6-Lane ProRacer	Mat-racing slide complex.
Typhoon Twister	2018	Proslide Technology Inc. Hybrid	Hybrid water slide featuring a bowl dropping into a zero-G wave wall. Utilizes four-person "cloverleaf" tubes.

== Entertainment venues ==
Mid America Adventure has several theaters that host daily shows during its operating season. With the exception of the summer concert series, all shows are free to attend.

Name	Location	Description
Palace Theater	1904 World's Fair	Large indoor performance theater. Home to daily shows including Fright Fest's "Love at First Fright," which has been performed at the park almost every year since 1993. In the summer of 2025, it was home to "Brad Ross: International Star Illusionist".
Palace Porch	1904 World's Fair	An outdoor performance space on the steps of the Palace Theater.
Miss Kitty's Saloon	Gateway To The West	Small indoor performance theater styled after an Old West saloon.
Empire Theater	Studio Backlot	Medium-sized indoor theater, formerly home to a puppet show and an indoor ice skating show.
Old Glory Amphitheatre	Illinois (Old Chicago)	Large outdoor venue previously used for summer concerts.

== Annual events ==
=== Fright Fest ===
Fright Fest was introduced in 1988 as "Fright Nights", which ran until Fright Nights V in 1992. In 1993, the event became Fright Fest under the ownership of Time Warner, who wanted each Six Flags park's Halloween event to use the same name for branding purposes. The event runs from mid to late September through Halloween and typically features several haunted attractions and scare zones, as well as live entertainment. Fright Fest celebrated its 30th anniversary in 2018.

Fright Fest was replaced with Hallowfest in 2020 in response to the COVID-19 pandemic. Park capacity was reduced to 25% of its normal capacity and all haunted houses, scare zones, and shows were replaced with outdoor, socially distanced alternatives.

== Former attractions ==
Name	Opened	Closed	Manufacturer/Ride Type	Other notes/Reason For Removal
Mule-Go-Round	1971	1972		
Injun Joe's Cave	1971	1978	Arrow Water dark ride	Theme/name changed to Time Tunnel in 1979.
Super Sports Car Ride	1971	1979	Arrow Sports Cars	Replaced by The Buccaneer (The Joker Inc.) and Jet Scream.
The Sky-Way	1971	1981	Von Roll	Illinois and USA stations; Accident on July 26, 1978, killed three and seriously injured one when a car fell from the ride.
Adventures on the Mississippi	1971	1982	Arrow Boat Ride	Similar to Jungle Cruise; replaced by Thunder River.
Tiltmore Hotel	1971	1982	Crooked fun house	Building became entrance to Thunder River. Other names: Angle Tangle (1971 - 1972), The Funn Family Place (1973 - 1974).
Sky Chuter	1978	1982	Intamin 250 ft (76 m) tall Paratower	Replaced by Aero Flyer; moved to Six Flags Great Adventure.
Haunted House	1979	1982	Haunted House Company walk through haunted house	Was added late in 1979 (on Labor Day weekend); may have had a temporary location in fall of 1979, before moved to the former Tidal Wave location in 1980. Attraction was 4 trailers linked together with a haunted house facade in front of them; attraction was moved from Six Flags Great Adventure where it operated as the original Haunted House (not the expanded Haunted Castle) in the fall of 1978.
Action Factory with River King Disco & Rock 'N Reel	1979/1980	1981/1983	Intamin Motion Simulator & Disco dance area	Action Factory area (part of River King Mine Train station building and transfer station building) included a space themed motion simulator in 1979 and the disco dance area; Rock ' N Reel (motion simulator with virtual rides about the park) was added in 1980 to replace the space-themed movie that was shown in 1979. Motion simulator was likely identical to the Sensational Sense Machine at Six Flags Over Texas. The motion simulator and the disco area were removed/closed in 1981, but the building remained open until 1983.
Happy Hotrods	1975	1984	Kiddie spinning car ride	Located in Goodtime Hollow; replaced by new Looney Tunes Town area/rides.
Fort Funtier	1975	1984	Kid's playground area	Located in Goodtime Hollow; replaced by new Looney Tunes Town area/rides.
Ball Crawl	1982	1984	kiddie Ball Crawl	may have been part of the Fort Funtier area Located in Goodtime Hollow; replaced by new Looney Tunes Town area/rides.
Pet-A-Pet	1971	1985	Petting zoo	Replaced by Colossus.
River King Mine Train (second track)	1971	1988	Arrow Mine Train	Was located in Illinois section. One of two separate Arrow Mine Train roller coasters at the park. Other names: The River King Mine Train (1971); River King Run-Away Mine Train (1972 - 1983); Rail Blazer (1984), which included stand-up modifications and was subsequently shut down upon the death of a 46-year-old woman in July 1984. In 1988, it was removed and sold to Dollywood, where it operated as Thunder Express until 1998, whereupon it was relocated to Magic Springs and Crystal Falls and operates today as Big Bad John. This track was partially replaced by Ninja.
Jet Scream	1981	1988	Schwarzkopf Looping Star	Was located in USA section, where Batman: The Ride is located today. Replaced the Super Sports Car Ride. Indirectly replaced by Ninja, ride moved to Six Flags Astroworld where it operated as Viper until the park closed in 2005, then the ride was scrapped, with the vehicles being sent to Frontier City.
Tunnel Del Tiempo	1979	1988	Water dark ride	Theme/name changed to Legends Of The Dark Castle in 1989. Other names: Time Tunnel (1979 - 1986)
The Condor	1988	1988	HUSS Condor	Removed as part of the ride rotation program.
Elmer Fudd Constwuction Company	1985	1989	kiddie sandbox	Located in Looney Tunes Town; replaced by Speedy Gonzales Speedway.
Yosemite Sam Summit	1985	1989	kiddie ball crawl with summit	Located in Looney Tunes Town.
Legends Of The Dark Castle	1989	1991	Water dark ride	Theme/name changed to Castaway Kids in 1992.
Tremors Dance Pavilion	1989	1992	Dance Pavilion, open select nights	Became Carrot Club (character meet-and-greet lunch area) in 1993; replaced by Batman: The Ride.
Mo-Mo The Monster	1973	1994	Eyerly Aircraft Company Monster	Replaced by Riverview Racer (Aero Flyer) in 1996.
Foghorn Leghorn Funasium	1985	1996	kiddie ball crawl with slide	Located in Looney Tunes Town; replaced by Looney Tooter (now Foghorn Leghorn National Park Railway).
Speedy Gonzales Speedway	1990	1996	kiddie battery powered jeeps	Located in Looney Tunes Town; replaced by Looney Tooter (now Foghorn Leghorn National Park Railway).
Porky Pig B-B-B Ball Park	1985	1999	kiddie ball crawl	Located in Looney Tunes Town; replaced by Crazy Maze.
Road Runner Rally	1985	1999	Mason Corporation roller racers/scooters	Located in Looney Tunes Town; moved to new location in 1990; replaced by Crazy Maze Other names: Tasmanian Devil Taxi Company (1985 - 1989).
Castaway Kids Comic Book Adventure	1992	1999	water dark ride	Ride was closed in 2000 and 2001; replaced by Scooby-Doo Ghostblasters. Other names: Castaway Kids Jungle Adventure (1992 - 1996).
Tom's Twister	1972	2005	Chance Rides Rotor	Replaced by Bugs Bunny National Park.
Tweety's Flying Cages	1984	2005	San Antonio Roller Works kiddie Ferris Wheel	Located in Looney Tunes Town; replaced by movement of Rockin' Roller. Other names: Ferris Wheel (1984), Flying Cages (1985 - 1992).
Bugs Bunny Burrow	1985	2005	kiddie tunnel crawl	Located in Looney Tunes Town; replaced by extension of Moon Cars track.
Cat Climb	1985	2005	kiddie net climb with slide	Located in Looney Tunes Town; replaced by extension of Moon Cars track.
Eagle's Bluff	1998	2005	Extra charge rock climbing wall	
Marvin's Maze	2000	2005	Kiddie maze	Located in Looney Tunes Town; replaced by extension of Moon Cars track. Other names: Crazy Maze (2000 - 2001).
4-D Theater	2001	2005	Extra charge Ham on Rye VR.	Other names: Virtual Theater (2001 - 2004).
Rockin' Roller	1975	2007	Bradley and Kaye Little Dipper	Was located in 1904 World's Fair ("Fairgrounds") - formerly Looney Tunes Town and Goodtime Hollow. Location moved from south side of kiddie area to north side (next to Log Flume drop) in 2006. Other names: Rock Candy Express (1975 - 1984), Acme Gravity Powered Roller Ride (1985 - 2005).
Great Race Speedway	2002	2007	Hampton kiddie spinning car ride	Ride was closed in 2007; replaced by American Thunder (Evel Knievel). Other names: Speedy Gonzales Speedway (2002 - 2005).
Daffy Duck Duccaneer	2006	2007	Sartori kiddie swinging ship	Ride was moved from Six Flags Fiesta Texas; replaced by movement of Daffy Duck Stars On Parade (kiddie swing ride).
Slingshot	2002	2008	extra charge Funtime Sling Shot.	Ride opened mid-season; Ride moved to Six Flags New England.
Kiddie-Go-Round	1975	2010	Herschell kiddie Carousel	Ride was moved to new location in "Fairgrounds"/Looney Tunes Town area in 2006, ride was closed in 2007, removed late in 2007 for American Thunder (Evel Knievel) construction and then moved to new location near the exit of Log Flume in 2008. Other names: Last Roundup (1975 - 1984), Merry Melodies Go-Round (1985 - 2005).
Riverview Racer	1983	2010	Chance Rides Yo-Yo	Originally located in England section (replaced Sky Chuter), moved to the Illinois section of the park in 1996; replaced by SkyScreamer. Other names: Aero Flyer (1983 - 1994), Dragon's Wing (1995).
Water Street Cab Company	1973	2012	Soli bumper cars	Removed at the end of the 2012 season to make room for Boomerang. Other names: Dodge City (1973–1990).
Powder Keg	1971	1996/2013	Intamin Drunken Barrels	Ride was closed from 1997 to 2013, removed at end of the 2013 season to make room for Tsunami Soaker. Other names: Hannibarrels (1971-1995)
Scooby-Doo! Ghostblasters: The Mystery of the Scary Swamp	2002	2014	Sally Corporation interactive family dark ride	Heavily modified former dark ride (replaced Castaway Kids). Scooby-Doo Ghostblasters: Mystery of the Scary Swamp closed permanently on September 14, 2014. It was replaced by Justice League: Battle for Metropolis which opened on June 5, 2015.
Rush Street Flyer	1987	2015	Chance Rides Falling Star	Removed at the end of the 2015 season to make room for Fireball. Relocated to La Ronde as Gravitor. One of the few rides that did not allow single riders.
Turbo Bungy	2001	2015	Eurobungy bungee/trampoline	Moved to former Eagle's Bluff (rock wall) location for the 2014 season. Removed after the 2015 season. One of the few upcharge attractions at the park.
Speed Slides	1999	2017	Combo slide tower at Hurricane Harbor	Removed at the end of the 2017 season to make room for Typhoon Twister.
Highland Fling	1977	2017	Schwarzkopf Enterprise	Removed from the Britannia section of the park at the end of the 2017 season due to maintenance/parts issues. Replaced by Supergirl: Sky Flyer.
Tidal Wave	1991	2019	Hopkins Rides	A shoot-the-chutes water ride. Did not operate during 2019 season. Tidal wave was removed at the end of the 2019 season.
Speed O'Drome Go-Karts	1999	2019	J&J Amusements	Partially replaced by Rookie Racer coaster in 2023.
Moon Antique Cars	1971	2007/2020	Arrow Dynamics	An antique cars attraction with cars that resembled 1911 Cadillacs. The track was significantly shortened following the 2007 season to make way for Evel Knievel at the time (now known as American Thunder).
Hook's Lagoon	1999	2020	SCS Interactive "Discovery Treehouse"	Original play structure removed from Hurricane Harbor after 2020 season. Replaced with new play structure in 2022 and reopened as Adventure Cove. Adventure Cove reuses existing pool area and slides.
Superman: Tower of Power	2006	2020	Intamin	A drop tower ride themed after Superman from DC Comics. It was originally built in 1997 at the defunct Six Flags AstroWorld, where it operated as Dungeon Drop, until the park's closure in 2005. Removed in 2021 and replaced with Catwoman Whip in 2022.
Bonzai Pipeline	2012	2022	Proslide Technology Inc. SuperLOOP	Looping water slide. SBNO during 2022. Removed after 2022 season.
Xcalibur	2003	2022	Nauta Bussink Baily	An Evolution thrill ride, themed after the Round Table of King Arthur. Removed after 2022 season.
Dragon's Wing	1996	2022	Skycoaster, Inc.	An extra charge Skycoaster attraction. Replaced by Joker Carnival of Chaos in 2024.
Tsunami Soaker	2014	2023	Mack Rides	A "Twist-N-Splash" water ride. Guests board one of multiple barrel vehicles and spray other guests. Currently standing but not operating (SBNO).
Justice League: Battle for Metropolis	2015	2026	Sally Corporation	An interactive dark ride featuring an original story experience based on the Justice League. Hosted by Cyborg, an animatronic of whom is in the ride's station. Originally called Scooby-Doo Ghostblasters The Mystery of the Scary Swamp.

== Gallery ==
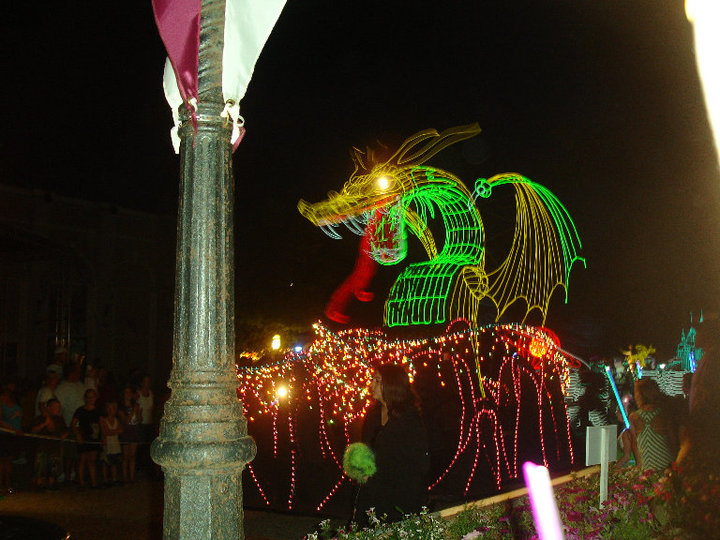
Glow in the Park Parade at Six Flags St. Louis (Removed after the 2010 Season)

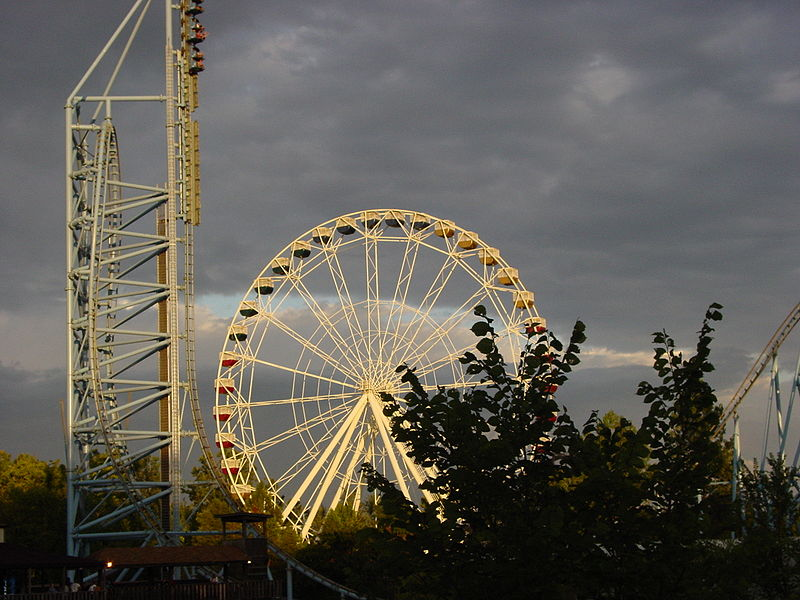
Mr. Freeze next to Colossus

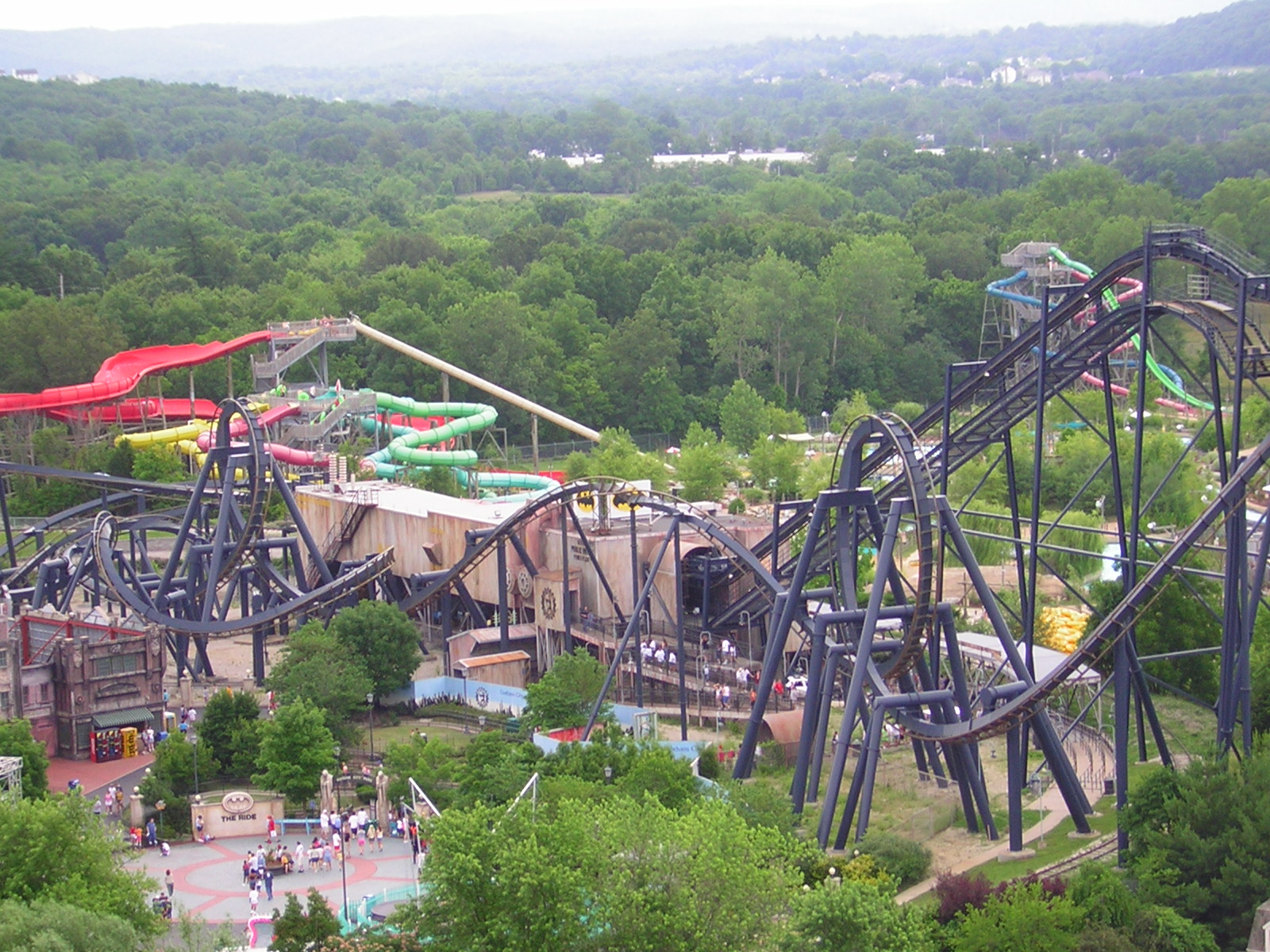
Batman: The Ride

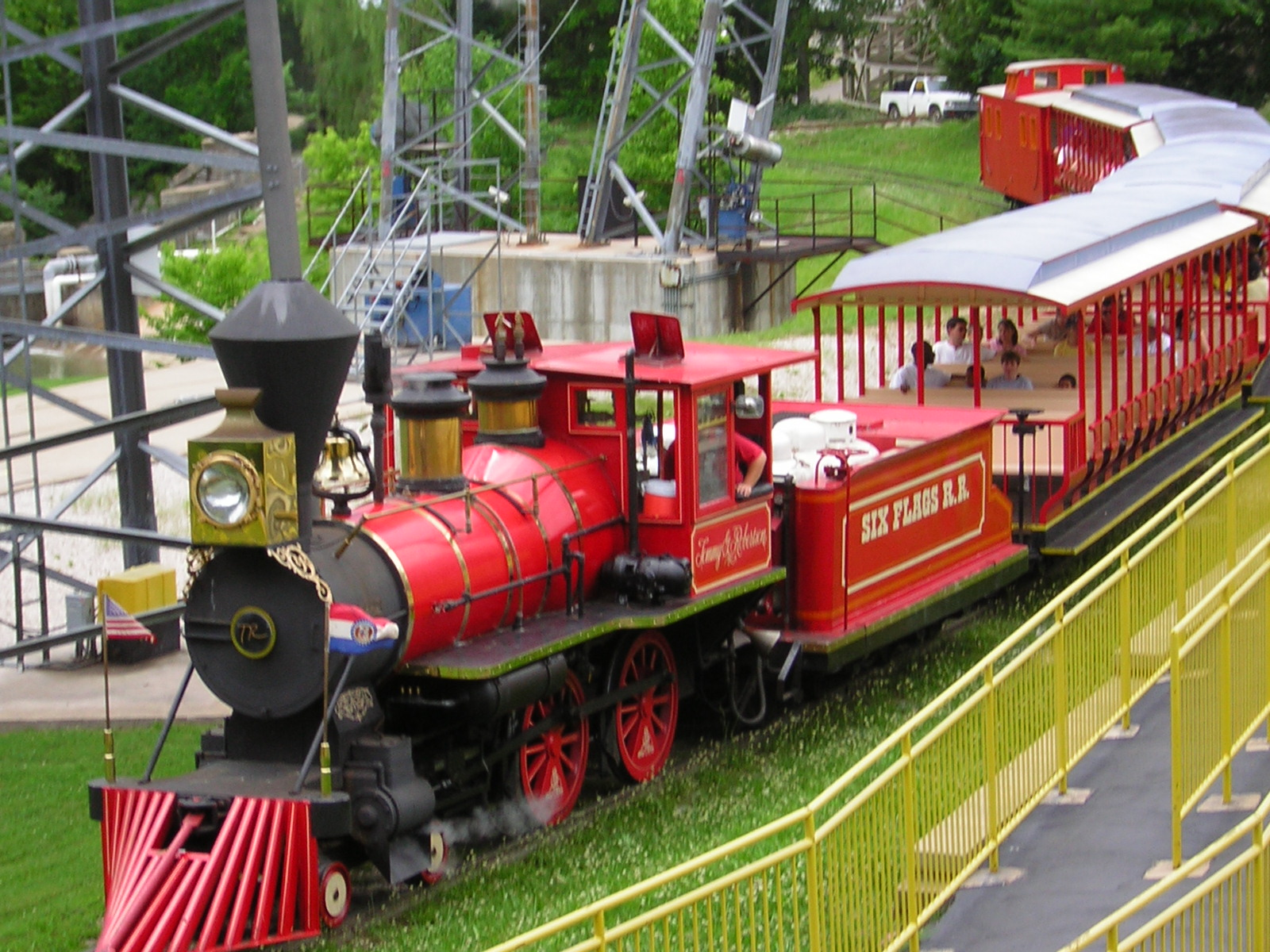
Tommy G. Robertson Railroad

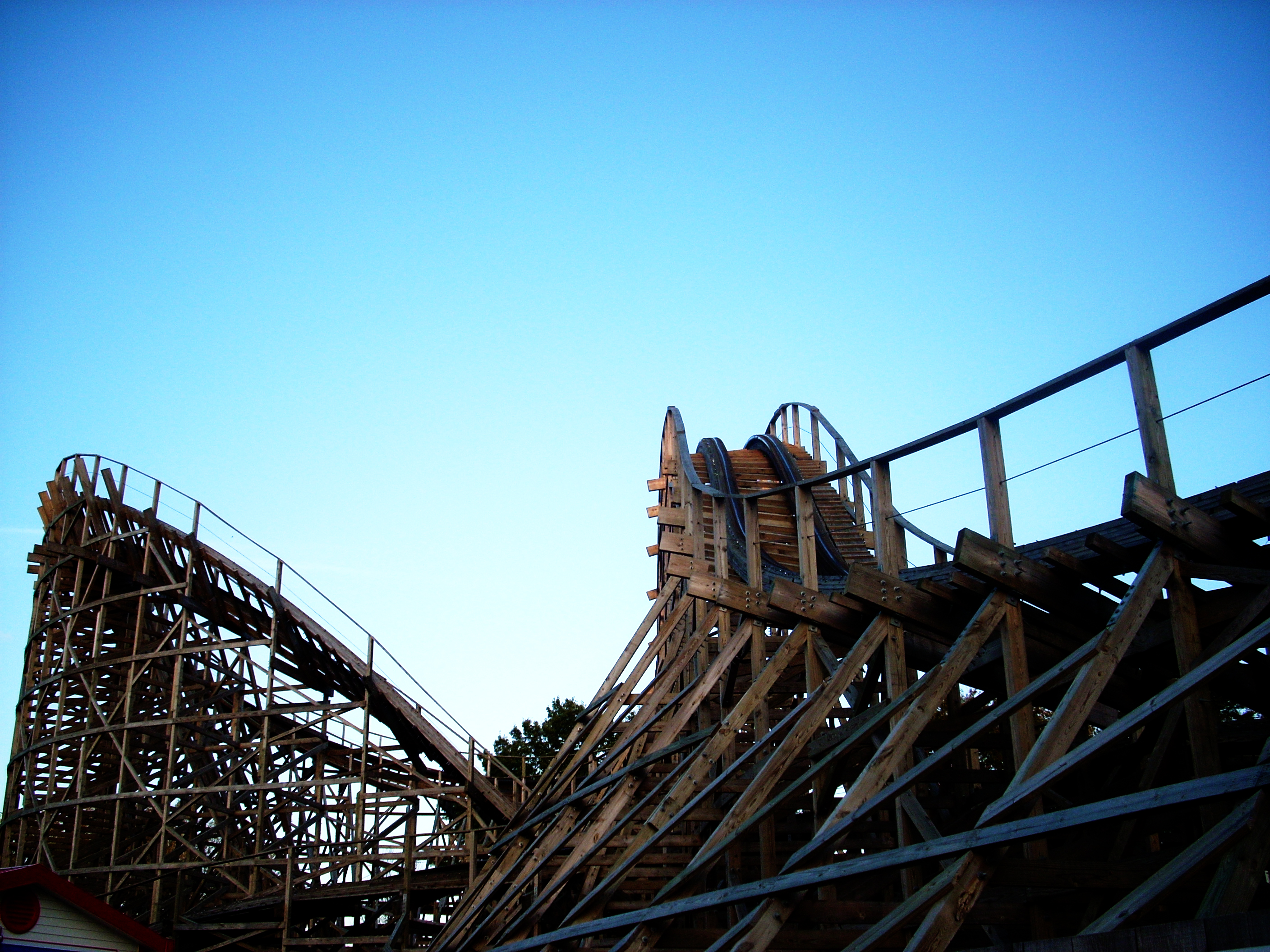
American Thunder (Formerly Evel Knievel prior to the 2011 Season)

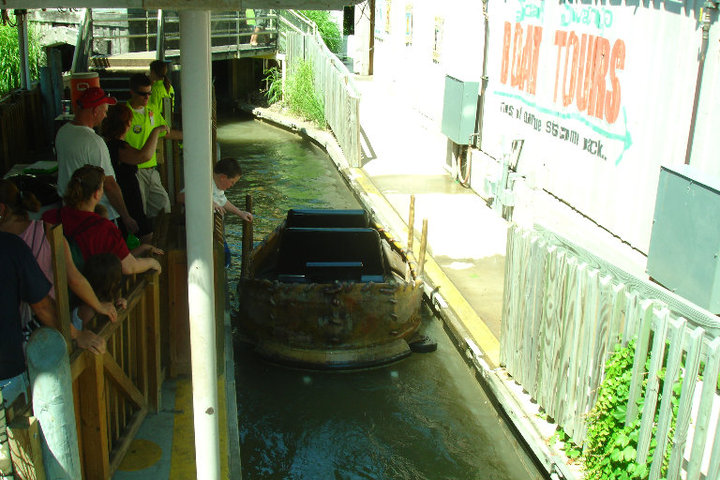
Scooby-Doo Ghostblasters: Mystery of the Scary Swamp (Replaced by Justice League: Battle for Metropolis)
