= Boomerang (Mid America Adventure) =

Boomerang roller coaster

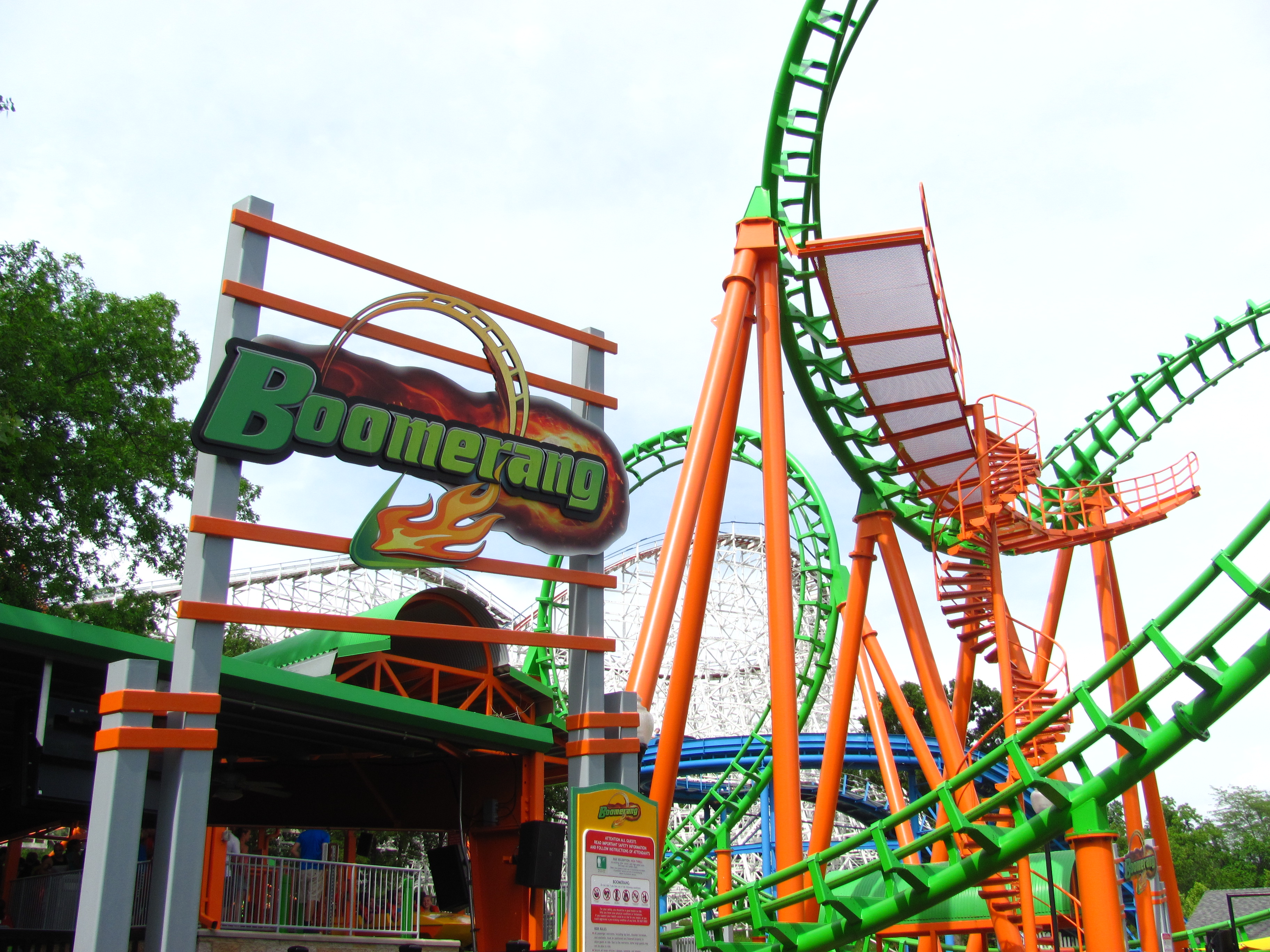

Mid America Adventure
- Park section: Illinois
- Coordinates: 38.5164°N 90.6749°W
- Status: Operating
- Opening date: June 8, 2013
- Replaced: Water Street Cab Company

Six Flags Over Texas
- Park section: Goodtimes Square
- Coordinates: 32.756657°N 97.066989°W
- Status: Removed
- Opening date: March 18, 1989
- Closing date: September 3, 2012
- Replaced by: Texas SkyScreamer

General statistics
- Type: Steel – Boomerang – Shuttle
- Manufacturer: Vekoma
- Model: Boomerang
- Lift/launch system: Chain lift hill
- Height: 116.5 ft (35.5 m)
- Drop: 108 ft (33 m)
- Length: 935 ft (285 m)
- Speed: 47 mph (76 km/h)
- Inversions: 3 (each traversed twice)
- Duration: 1:48
- Max vertical angle: 65°
- Capacity: 760 riders per hour
- G-force: 5.2
- Height restriction: 48 in (122 cm)
- Trains: Single train with 7 cars; riders arranged 2 across in 2 rows for a total of 28 riders per train
- Fast Lane available
- Must transfer from wheelchair
- Boomerang at RCDB

Boomerang is a boomerang roller coaster located at Mid America Adventure in Eureka, Missouri. It opened to the public on June 8, 2013. The ride originally opened as Flashback in 1989 at Six Flags Over Texas, where it operated through 2012.

== History ==
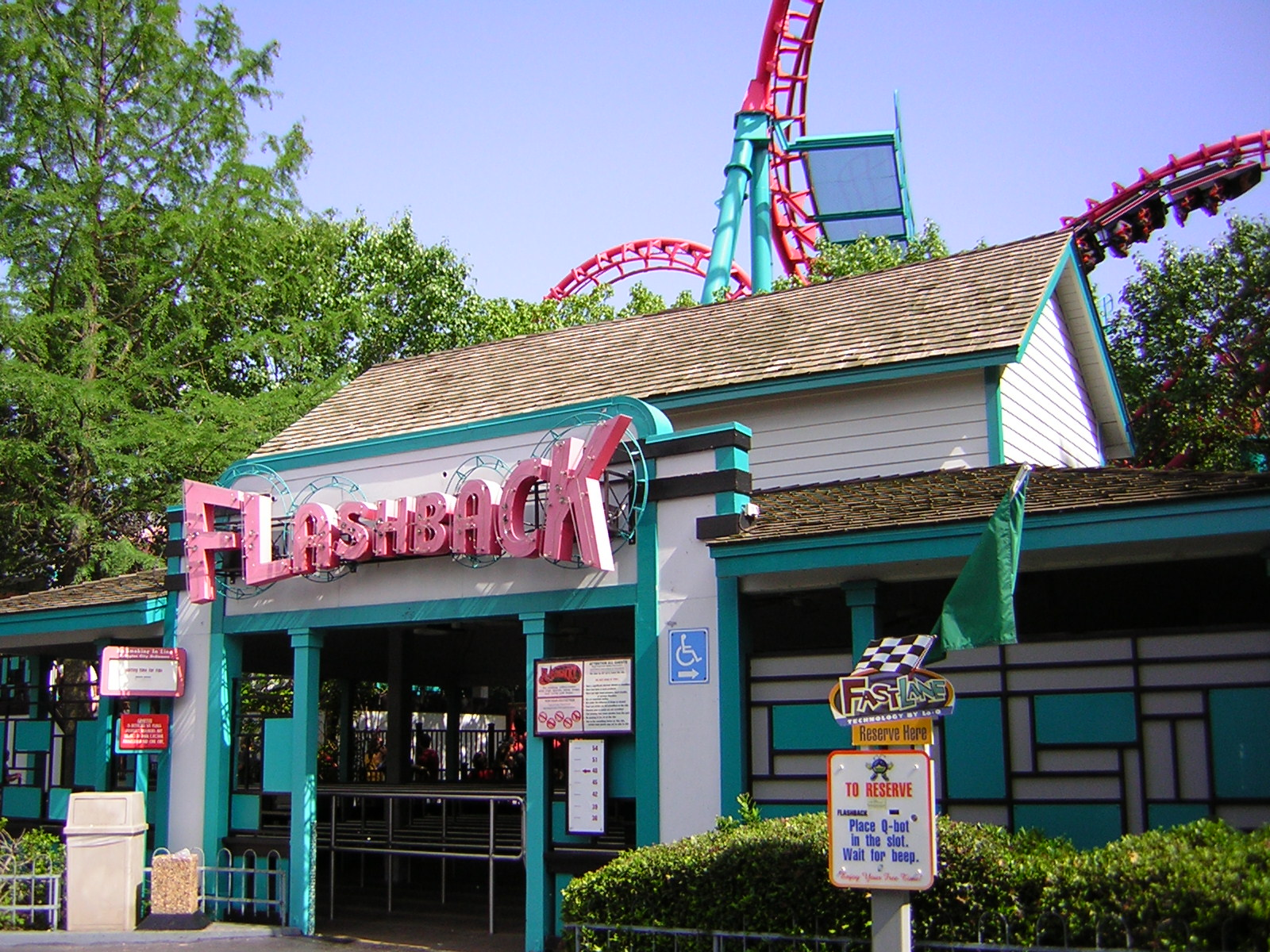
Flashback at Six Flags Over Texas

On March 18, 1989, the ride originally opened at Six Flags Over Texas under the name Flashback. It was one of the first Vekoma Boomerang coasters to open in the United States. This model was sold to numerous amusement parks including Knott's Berry Farm, Hersheypark, Lake Compounce, as well as each park owned by Funtime and Premier Parks.

Flashback originally had a red track and black supports. During the 2001 season, the track was repainted strawberry pink while the supports were repainted teal. In 2004, the ride received a new train from Vampire at Kentucky Kingdom.

On August 2, 2012, Six Flags Over Texas announced the last chance to ride Flashback would be September 3, before it closed along with the neighboring ride Texas Chute Out. Following its closure, it was announced that Flashback would be dismantled and relocated to then-named Six Flags St. Louis for the 2013 season. Flashback was completely removed before October 10, 2012. The coaster replaced Water Street Cab Company (Bumper Cars) and operates under the name Boomerang in the Illinois section of the park with a new orange and green color scheme. Boomerang is the ninth coaster at Six Flags St. Louis, helping the Six Flags park become the park with the most coasters in the state of Missouri. Construction of the coaster began in early 2013 at the former site of Water Street Cab Company, with Boomerang track arriving at the park on February 11, 2013. The park completed construction of Boomerang in early April. Boomerang opened on June 8, 2013.

On May 6, 2016, one of the trains abruptly stopped mid-course causing minor injuries to four riders. Guests were able to safely exit the ride. The attraction was closed pending the investigation into the incident, and re-opened in November 2016.

== Ride experience ==
=== Layout ===
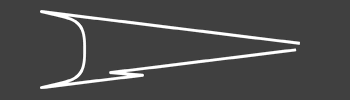
Track layout of the ride

The ride begins when the train is pulled backwards from the station and up a lift hill, before being released. After being released, the train passes through the station, enters a Cobra roll element (referred to as a boomerang by the designers), then travels through a vertical loop. Upon exiting the loop, the train runs up a second lift hill, which is angled so that the two lifts meet at the top in a "V"-like formation. Once out of momentum, the train is towed to the top of the lift hill, and is held for several seconds before being released; traveling through the roller coaster in reverse before returning to the station.

=== Train ===
Boomerang only runs one train, with seven cars. In each car there are two rows of two seats, allowing for a total of 28 riders. The train is painted a bright yellow with an orange stripe down the side with a green pinstripe outlining the orange stripe.

== See also ==
- 2012 in amusement parks
- 2013 in amusement parks
