= Excalibur (yacht) =

Australian racing yacht

- Yacht club: Royal Melbourne Yacht Squadron
- Nation: Australia
- Builder: Applied Alloy Yachts; Bayswater, Australia
- Owner(s): Alan Saunders

Specifications
- Length: 15.2 m (50 ft) (LOA)

Excalibur was a 15.2-metre (50 ft) racing yacht based in Melbourne, Victoria, at the Royal Melbourne Yacht Squadron and owned by Alan Saunders.

== Capsize ==
Excalibur capsized 40 nautical miles off Port Stephens after losing her keel. Excalibur was returning to Melbourne from Coff's Harbour after competing in the 2002 Hamilton Island Race Week. The skipper was Brian McDermott and the crew consisted of Christopher Heyes, Tracy Luke, Peter McLeod, Ann-Maree Pope and John Rogers. All but McDermott and Rogers died, with the body of Christopher Heyes being found on board the upturned hull and the bodies of Tracy Luke, Peter McLeod, Ann-Maree Pope lost at sea.

Brian McDermott and John Rogers survived after spending seven hours drifting in the sea before being found and rescued by the MV Curia, a 50,000 tonne bulk carrier.

== Recovery ==
Excalibur was recovered by the Devine Marine Group to Sydney Harbour after being found 300 nautical miles (560 km) east of Jervis Bay.

== Controversy ==
Forensic examination of the keel after recovery of Excalibur found that the keel had been cut and re-welded. The welding was defective and eventually failed causing the keel to detach from the boat, which resulted in the boat capsizing within 30 seconds. Manslaughter charges were brought against Adrian Presland and Alex Cittadini who both worked for Applied Alloy Yachts, who built Excalibur. Adrian Presland, the welder in charge of the keel of Excalibur, was acquitted. Alex Cittadini, a director of Applied Alloy Yachts, was convicted on four counts of manslaughter in April 2009. On 10 July 2009 he was sentenced to 3 years jail with a non parole period of 18 months. The convictions were overturned by the NSW Court of Criminal Appeal on 18 December 2009. The court found that the jury's verdict was unreasonable, and an acquittal was directed.

== Tributes ==
The Australian Women's Keelboat Regatta, held at the Royal Melbourne Yacht Squadron, includes a trophy in the IRC division called the Ann Maree Pope - Tracy Luke perpetual IRC Trophy in memory of Anne Maree and Tracy.
