= Ninja (Mid America Adventure) =

Roller coaster

- Previously known as Scream Machine at Expo '86 (1986)
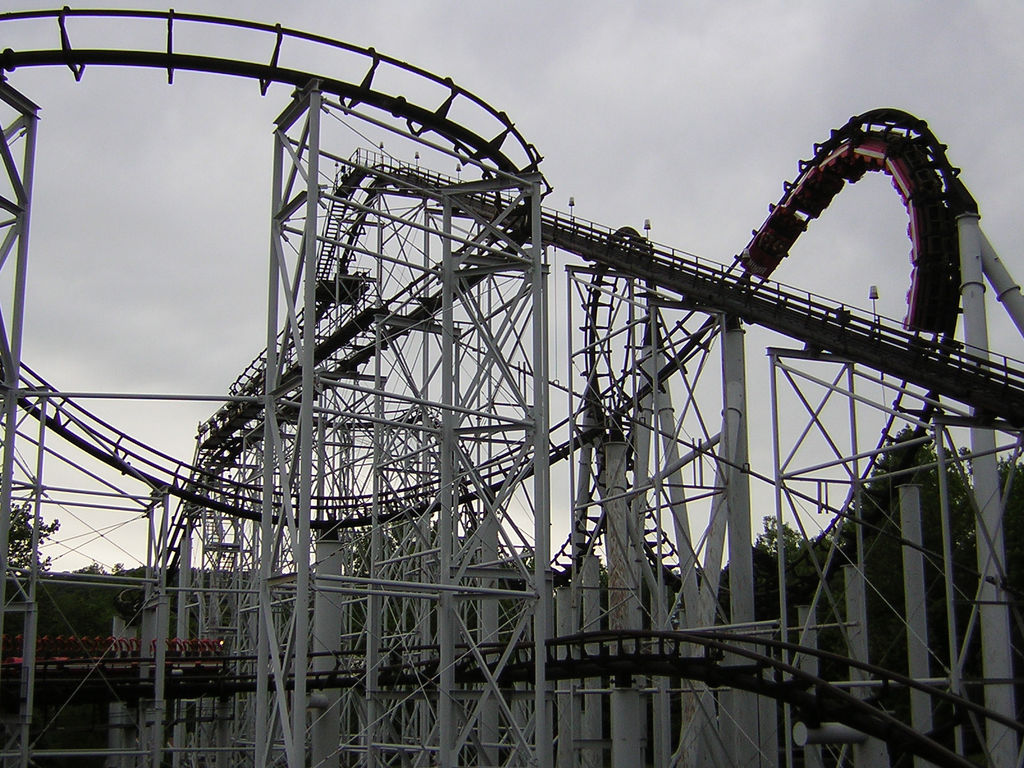

Mid America Adventure
- Park section: Studio Backlot
- Coordinates: 38.514939°N 90.673893°W
- Status: Operating
- Opening date: April 8, 1989
- Replaced: Jet Scream

Expo '86
- Coordinates: 49.2776°N 123.10845°W
- Status: Removed
- Opening date: May 1986
- Closing date: October 1986

General statistics
- Type: Steel
- Manufacturer: Vekoma
- Designer: Ron Toomer
- Model: Custom MK-1200
- Track layout: custom
- Height: 108.3 ft (33.0 m)
- Drop: 80 ft (24 m)
- Length: 2,430 ft (740 m)
- Speed: 54.7 mph (88.0 km/h)
- Inversions: 4
- Duration: 2:00
- Height restriction: 48 in (122 cm)
- Trains: 2 trains with 7 cars; riders arranged 2 across in 2 rows for a total of 28 riders per train
- Fast Lane available
- Ninja at RCDB

Ninja is an Arrow Dynamics/Vekoma steel roller coaster located in the Studio Backlot section of Mid America Adventure in Eureka, Missouri. It was originally built for and located at Expo 86 in Vancouver, British Columbia, where it operated as Scream Machine from May to October 1986. It began operating as Ninja at Six Flags St. Louis on April 8, 1989. The coaster was started by American manufacturer Arrow Dynamics, but when Arrow fell into bankruptcy during construction, it was sold to Dutch manufacturer Vekoma, who finished it.

== Ride Layout ==
The ride features a loop, a sidewinder, mid course brake run, and a double corkscrew.

== Ride Operations ==
The Ninja, like most modern roller coasters, requires a minimum of two employees to dispatch the train. One operates the main panel, which controls the restraints and gates and has a section for the mechanics. The other operator stands at the remote enable. Both operators have to do an all clear sweep and thumbs up, then press their buttons at the same time.

== Virtual reality ==
Six Flags announced on March 3, 2016, that Ninja would receive The New Revolution: Virtual Reality Coaster experience on the ride. Riders have the option to wear Samsung Gear VR headsets, powered by Oculus, to create a 360-degree, 3D experience while riding. The illusion is themed to a fighter jet which riders fly through a futuristic city as co-pilots battling alien invaders. The feature debuted with the coaster when it reopened on May 27, 2016.

In early 2017, Galactic Attack Virtual Reality Coaster was announced to be coming to Ninja, a similar but upgraded version of The New Revolution.

== Color ==
Ninja was originally painted with red track and white supports, and the trains were painted white with red stripes and orange restraints. The colors were modified in 1998, the track was painted black, but the supports remained white and the trains are red with white stripes (though the restraints are still orange).

The ride got a new coat of paint for the 2010 season.

== Similarly named rides ==
The ride formerly shared a name with Blue Hawk at Six Flags Over Georgia until that coaster's retheming in 2016. Another roller coaster with the same name exists at Six Flags Magic Mountain, but that ride is an Arrow Dynamics suspended swinging coaster.
