= Magic Sword =

A magic sword is any kind of mythological or fictional sword imbued with magical power.

Magic sword may also refer to:

- Magic Sword (video game), 1990 side-scrolling fantasy arcade game
- The Magic Sword (1901 film), a British short silent fantasy film
- The Magic Sword (1950 film), a Yugoslav fantasy film, based on Serbian folk tales
- The Magic Sword (1962 film), an American fantasy film, loosely adapted from the St. George legend
- Quest for Camelot, titled The Magic Sword: Quest for Camelot in United Kingdom
- Magic Sword (band), three-piece American synthwave band from Boise, Idaho
