= Excalibur Pot =

Cave in North Yorkshire, England

- Location within North Yorkshire
- Location: Keldholme, North Yorkshire, UK
- OS grid: SE 7105 8780
- Coordinates: 54°16′52″N 0°54′35″W
- Depth: 30 metres (98 ft)
- Length: 2,840 metres (9,320 ft)
- Discovery: 2007
- Geology: Corallian limestone
- Entrances: 3
- Access: CNCC Permit
- Cave survey: On CNCC website

Excalibur Pot is a natural cave in the North York Moors area of England. It is the only major cave known in the North York Moors, and is formed within the Corallian limestone of the Upper Jurassic. The entrance is in the normally dry stream bed of Hutton Beck, midway between Hutton-le-Hole and Keldholme.

Two short pitches of 8 m and 5 m descend to a large chamber, which is followed by an extensive inlet series, and a large main streamway accessed by a 4 m pitch. Several areas have admirable formations, far more elaborate than anything else found on the North York Moors. The sources of the water are various sinks in Hutton Beck, and the stream eventually resurges from Bogg Hall Rising in the adjacent Douthwaite Dale at Keldholme. It has two other entrances, both associated with Hutton Beck - Jenga Pot (SE 71214 87563), and Secret Dig (SE 71488 87768).
