= The Sword in the Stone =

The Sword in the Stone may refer to:

- A sword in Arthurian legend which can be pulled only by the rightful King of the Britons
- The sword of Galgano Guidotti, embedded in a rock at Montesiepi Chapel, Siena, Italy

== Film and television ==
- The Sword in the Stone (1963 film), an American animated film based on the novel by T. H. White
- "The Sword in the Stone", a two-part episode of the television series Merlin

== Music ==
- The Sword in the Stone, a 1939 composition by Benjamin Britten
- "The Sword in the Stone", a song by Kayak from their 1981 album Merlin
- "The Sword in the Stone", a song by Ted Leo and the Pharmacists from their 2003 EP Tell Balgeary, Balgury Is Dead
- "The Sword in the Stone", a song by Banks & Steelz from their 2016 album Anything But Words

== Other uses ==
- The Sword in the Stone (novel), a 1938 novel by T. H. White
- "The Sword in the Stone", a short story featured in the 1997 anthology Alternate Tyrants by Michelle Sagara
- The Sword in the Stone, a 2003 play by Marty Chan
- "The Sword in the Stone", an adventure in the 1995 role-playing game supplement Indiana Jones and the Tomb of the Templars

== See also ==
- Excalibur (disambiguation)
- "Sword and Stone", a 1989 song by Bonfire
- "Sword from the Stone", a 2021 song by Passenger
