= Excalibur (board game) =

Excalibur is a board game published in 1989 by Wotan Games.

== Contents ==
Excalibur is a game in which each player has to obtain manors from which they can obtain revenue which they can use to buy troops or improve the manors to gain extra revenue.

== Reception ==
Iain Bowen reviewed Excalibur for Games International magazine, and gave it 2 stars out of 5, and stated that "All in all, I cannot recommend the game to the average games player. Those who continually tinker with games, however, will find hours of fun in dragging out the decent game which lurks deep within."

== Reviews ==
- Jeux & Stratégie nouvelle formule #1
