= Evolution (ride) =

Large thrill ride

A Fabbri evolution in action

Evolution is a large thrill ride manufactured by FarFabbri in Italy.

It consists of four inclined pillars which support a revolving arm. On one end of the arm are some counterweights and on the other is a rotating hub which holds 10 cars. The minimum height requirement is 48 inches (120 cm) or taller. Portable Fabbri units break down on to two trailers. Set up requires around 5–6 hours for the ride's assembly. The original ride was manufactured in 1992 by Nauta Bussink (now Ronald Bussink). Bussink built only three Evolutions. Evolution was in Mirabilandia before it was sold to Six Flags Great Adventure in 1999 and relocated to Six Flags St. Louis during the 2002 off-season. The second one, dubbed Imperator, was sold to a showman in China. The third is in storage in the Netherlands.

As of right now only three Fabbri Evolutions travel in the U.S. One is owned by independent carnival operator Bishop Amusement Rides of San Antonio, Texas and travels with Ray Cammack Shows. The second Evolution is owned by Butler Amusements of Fairfield, California, and the third Evolution is Owned by Fantasilandia in Santiago, Chile.

== The cars ==
The cars are able to tip back 90 degrees so that passengers are lying on their backs looking up. The arm makes a 360 degree rotation around its axis spinning the cars upside down to a height of 20 meters (66 feet). There are 4 riders per each car. The restraint is an over the head harness. Fabbri Versions have 10 cars seating 40 riders and Bussink models have 16 cars seating 64 people.

== Variations ==
There are two manufacturers of the Evolution, Far Fabbri and Nauta Bussink make Evolution rides however both versions are quite different. The Fabbri ride is much smaller than the Bussink version which is some times referred to as the Giant Evolution. It has capacity for 64 passengers per ride whilst Fabbri's only seats 40 riders. When the wheel is spinning in the air, the Fabbri model will either hold the seats upside-down or face down (depending on the controls) and the Bussink model will actually hold riders right-side up when the wheel is at the top.

== Rotations ==
Bussink Evolutions will normally only circuit once around like the Xcalibur at Six Flags St. Louis made by Bussink, while Fabbri versions will circuit around multiple times depending on the operator.

== Incidents ==
On March 14, 2003, an Evolution ride owned by Jerry Payne, collapsed at a Fair at the Regency Square Mall in Jacksonville, Florida. 3 people suffered only minor injuries. A police spokesman says the ride appeared to give way at its base as it was coming to a stop.

In May 2006, an Evolution ride at Great Yarmouth Pleasure Beach was stuck upside down for seven minutes.

In August 2011 a 12-year-old boy fell 30 feet from the ride (named Excaliber 2) at Camelot Theme Park in Lancashire, UK. He survived after hospital treatment. The park is now closed but the ride has been resurrected at Pleasureland Southport.

== Names ==
Other names for the Fabbri Versions include Discovery, Excalibur, Excalibur 2, Terroriser, Obliterator, Superman (at Ulten castle) and Circulator. The Bussink version has also been named Xcalibur, Evolution and Imperator. The Bussink version is a pretty rare attraction as there are only three produced. Xcalibur is located at Six Flags St. Louis (formerly operated at Six Flags Great Adventure and prior to that traveled throughout Europe before being rethemed and sent to its current location). Imperator was the second model produced. It started out traveling the fairs in Europe until it found a permanent home in Vienna's Prater Park, until 2003 when it was dismantled and sent to travel the fairs again for the next few seasons. Imperator is now sold to China and has not yet been spotted anywhere. The third model is the most mysterious as it is the least known model of the three. It is believed that the third model is in storage somewhere in the Netherlands. The Fabbri version is far more common and can be found at parks and fairs around the world.
