= List of Six Flags Over Texas attractions =

Six Flags Over Texas consists of nine themed areas, including areas themed to Texas and different aspects of its culture, other nations, and Looney Tunes/DC characters. Rides are interspersed throughout these sections.

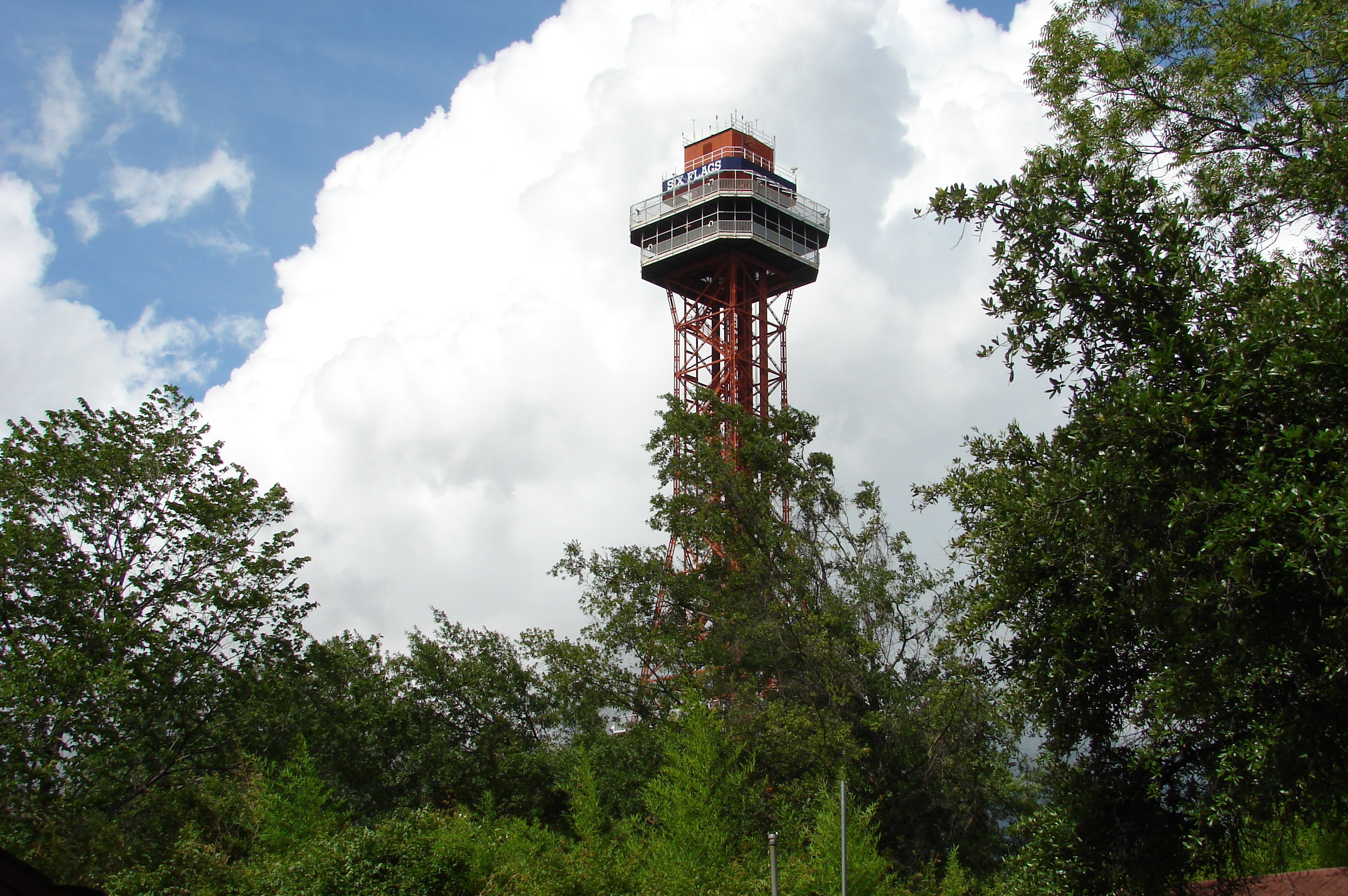
Oil Derrick an icon of the park

== Areas and attractions ==
=== Roller coasters ===
As of August 2026, Six Flags Over Texas features 13 roller coasters.

Name	Opened	Manufacturer	Model	Type	Description
Aquaman: Power Wave	2023	Mack Rides	Powersplash	Steel	This coaster was originally going to open in 2020. The opening was delayed to March 11, 2023 due to the COVID-19 pandemic, supply chain issues and the decision to add a turntable after construction was nearly complete.
Batman: The Ride	1999	Bolliger & Mabillard	Inverted Coaster	Steel	Intended to appeal to the older Baby Boomers generation, Batman: The Ride was designed by Werner Stengel and opened on May 26, 1999. It is situated in the Gotham City section of the park, which also debuted the same year.
Judge Roy Scream	1980	William Cobb & Associates	Custom	Wood	Judge Roy Scream opened as the park's first wooden coaster on March 1, 1980. Designed by William Cobb and constructed at a cost of $2.1 million, the 71-foot (22 m) ride features a 65-foot (20 m) drop and a maximum speed of 45 mph (72 km/h).
Mini Mine Train	1969	Arrow Dynamics	Mini Mine Train	Steel	A kiddie coaster geared for younger riders, the Mini Mine Train is a family-friendly mine train roller coaster with swift turns and maximum drop height of 20 feet (6.1 m).
Mr. Freeze	1998	Premier Rides	LIM Shuttle Loop Coaster	Steel	Designed by Werner Stengel, Mr. Freeze is a launched roller coaster powered by a linear induction motor (LIM). It features a height of 218 feet (66 m) and a maximum speed of 70 mph (110 km/h). This coaster was originally set to open in 1997. The opening was delayed to March 28, 1998 due to flaws with the launch system. The shoulder restraints were replaced with lap bars after the 2001 season. The ride operates two trains; since 2023, one is launched facing forward, and the other is launched facing backward.
New Texas Giant	2011	Rocky Mountain Construction	I-Box – Custom	Steel	Previously known as Texas Giant (1990–2009) before its track conversion from wood to steel, the coaster reemerged as New Texas Giant in 2011 after an extensive refurbishment by Rocky Mountain Construction. It was the first roller coaster to utilize the company's patented I-Box track technology, and its height and speed were slightly increased in the process.
Pandemonium	2008	Gerstlauer	Spinning Coaster	Steel	Originally branded as Tony Hawk's Big Spin (2008–2010), the name was later changed to Pandemonium in 2011. The Spinning Coaster model was designed by Werner Stengel, and features four-person cars that freely spin as riders traverse the track.
Runaway Mine Train	1966	Arrow Development	Mine Train	Steel	Designated as a historic Coaster Landmark by American Coaster Enthusiasts, the mine train roller coaster is the oldest coaster in the park. It opened as Run-A-Way Mine Train in 1966.
Runaway Mountain	1996	Premier Rides	Standard Coaster	Steel	An enclosed roller coaster designed by Werner Stengel that opened on June 12, 1996. Marketed with the slogan, "The coaster that dares the darkness", it reaches a height of 65 feet (20 m) and a maximum speed of 40 mph (64 km/h).
Shock Wave	1978	Anton Schwarzkopf		Steel	Designed by Werner Stengel, Shock Wave is a custom-designed steel coaster from Anton Schwarzkopf that features two inversions and a maximum speed of 60 mph (97 km/h).The coaster has been standing but not operating (SBNO) since March 2026.
The Joker	2017	S&S – Sansei Technologies	4D Free Spin	Steel	Designed by Alan Schilke, The Joker is the second spinning roller coaster to open at the park following Pandemonium. It features a 90-degree lift hill that stands 120-foot (37 m) tall, with each car able to spin 360 degrees vertically throughout the course of the track in a semi-controlled manner.
Titan	2001	Giovanola	Mega Coaster	Steel	A hypercoaster designed by Werner Stengel that stands 245 feet (75 m) high with a drop of 255 feet (78 m) and a maximum speed of 85 mph (137 km/h). Titan is the longest coaster in the park as well as the state of Texas.
Tormenta Rampaging Run	2026	Bolliger & Mabillard	Dive Coaster	Steel	A dive coaster from Bolliger & Mabillard that stands 309 feet (94 m) high with a 285 feet (87 m) high drop. Going over 87 mph (140 km/h), this coaster goes through multiple inversions, including the tallest Immelmann inversion and tallest vertical loop in the world. Tormenta is the tallest and fastest coaster in the park as well as the state of Texas.
Wile E. Coyote's Grand Canyon Blaster	2001	Chance Rides	Big Dipper	Steel	A kiddie coaster located in the Boomtown section of the park that features a maximum height of 16.1 feet (4.9 m).

=== Star Mall ===
The area serves as the entry gate for Six Flags Over Texas. It was one of the original sections of the park when it opened in 1961. It is named for the large star-shaped fountain located in the section.

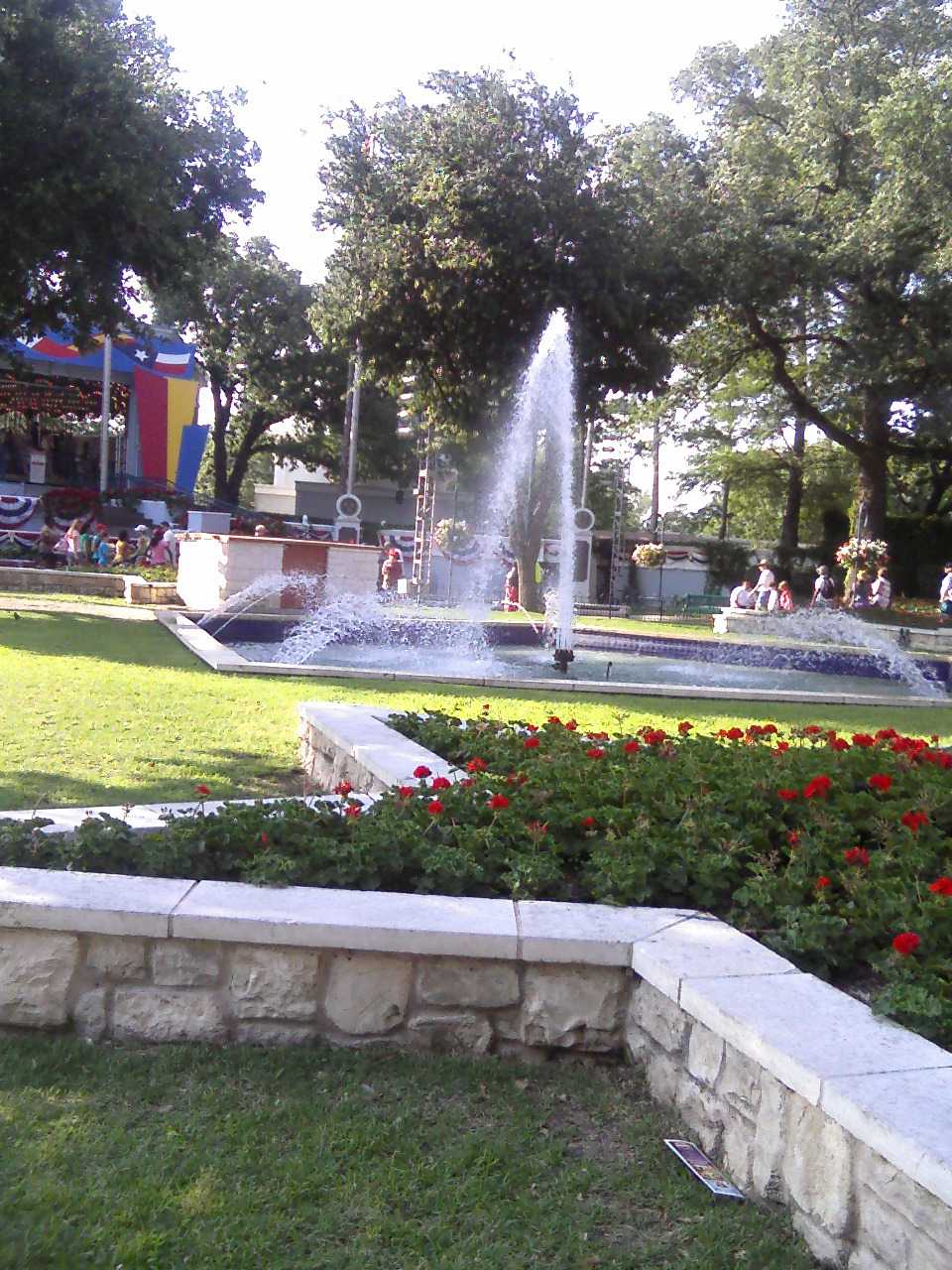

Ride	Manufacturer	Year opened	Description
Silver Star Carousel	Dentzel	1963	A classic carousel ride. The carousel was the last to be built by William Dentzel. Originally located in the Boomtown section, ride was removed for restoration in 1985 and reopened at current location in 1988.

=== Mexico and Spain ===
The Mexico & Spain area consists of two sections both of which were originally part of the park in 1961. Both sections represent a flag that has flown over the state of Texas.

Ride	Manufacturer	Year opened	Description
Casa Magnetica			A walk-through, tilted house attraction.
El Aserradero	Arrow	1963	A Log flume. World's First Log Flume. Features two separate log flumes: Flume I (1963) & Flume II (1968).
El Sombrero	Chance	1965	A Trabant. Located where La Fiesta de las Tazas current operates until 2005.
La Fiesta de las Tazas	Zamperla	2006	A classic Teacups ride.

=== Texas ===
The Texas section of the park was another original section when the park opened in 1961. It is named after the Republic of Texas flag that once flew over the state.

Ride	Manufacturer	Year opened	Description
Boot Scootin	Zamperla	2006	A Jump Around ride.
Dino Off Road Adventure	Arrow	1962	The ride was originally called Chaparral Antique Cars until 2023. The ride was reimaged in 2024, which features 15 animatronic dinosaurs along the path of the ride.
Pirates of Speelunker Cave	Arrow, Floating Dark Ride	2022	The attraction was called The Spee-Lunker's Cave from 1964 to 1991, and rethemed to Yosemite Sam and the Gold River Adventure! in 1992. A flooding event in September 2018 damaged the ride and caused it to remain idle. The park announced on its 60th anniversary that the dark ride would be reimagined with a new theme for the 2022 season.
Sidewinder	Eli Bridge	2006	A classic Scrambler ride. Formerly located at Six Flags AstroWorld.
Texas Depot		1961	A station for the 1961 train ride that takes around the park, Six Flags & Texas Railroad.

=== Old South and France ===
The Old South & France area consists of two sections both of which were originally part of the park in 1961. Both sections represent a flag that has flown over the state of Texas. The Old South was originally called The Confederacy and featured Civil War reenactments, including performances representing the execution of a captured Union spy. Wynne originally intended to name the park "Texas Under Six Flags." Various legends have attributed the name change to his wife Joann; a group called "The Daughters of The Texas Republic" — of which his wife may, or may not, have been a member; or his entertainment director, Charles Meeker, stating that, "Texas isn’t 'under' anything."

=== United States ===
The USA area of the park opened with the park in 1961. It was originally named the Modern Section, but still represented the United States flag that has flown over Texas. USA also has a kids' sub-section called Bugs Bunny Boomtown.

Ride	Manufacturer	Year opened	Description
Justice League: Battle for Metropolis	Sally	2015	A Interactive dark ride.

=== Bugs Bunny Boomtown ===
The kid's area of the park originally opened in 1983 as Pac-Man Land. With the introduction of Looney Tunes characters to the park, it was renamed to Looney Tunes Land around 1985. In 2001, the area was renamed once again when it was expanded to include new attractions. It was renamed Bugs Bunny Boomtown for 2014.

Ride	Manufacturer	Year opened	Description
Bugs Bunny Cloud Bouncer	SBF/VISA	2001	A Happy Tower.
Daffy Duck Bucket Blasters	Zamperla	2014	A Watermania ride. Due to the construction of Aquaman: Power Wave, the ride was removed and put into storage in 2021. The ride water ride was reconstructed and opened in a new location in 2024.
Looney Tunes Adventure Camp	Miracle Recreation Equipment	2014	A play structure.
Marvin the Martian Space Rockets	Zamperla	2014	A Junior Jets ride.
Speedy Gonzales' Truckin' Across America	Zamperla	1992	A convoy ride
Sylvester & Tweety Pounce and Bounce	Zamperla	2024	A Sky Tower ride. The tower was relocated from Six Flags America, which operated as Sky Jumper.
Taz Tornado Swings	Zamperla	2014	A Lolly Swing ride.

=== Goodtimes Square ===
Goodtimes Square opened in 1973 along with Mayor H.R. Pufnstuf and The Sid & Marty Krofft Superstars at that time. But over the years it took on a loose 1950's theme.

Ride	Manufacturer	Year opened	Description
Cloud Bouncer	Zamperla	2006	A Samba balloon tower.
Texas SkyScreamer	Funtime	2013	A Swing ride.

=== Gotham City ===
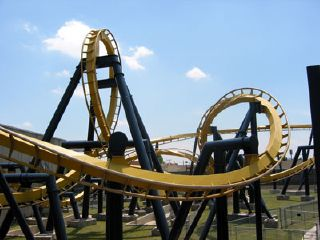

Gotham City opened in 1999 and is themed to the DC Comics Batman universe.

Ride	Manufacturer	Year opened	Description
Batwing	Zamperla	2006	A Telecombat ride.
Catwoman Whip	Zamperla	2016	A Zamperla Endeavor.
The Riddler Revenge	Zamperla	2016	A Giant Discovery ride.

=== Boomtown ===
The Boomtown section opened in 1963. It is based on the Texas boomtowns that sprung up in Texas during the oil boom era.

Ride	Manufacturer	Year opened	Description
Boomtown Depot		1961	A station for the 1961 train ride that takes around the park, Six Flags & Texas Railroad.
The Gunslinger	Chance	1983	A Yo-Yo. Operated as Texas Tornado until 2007.

=== Tower ===
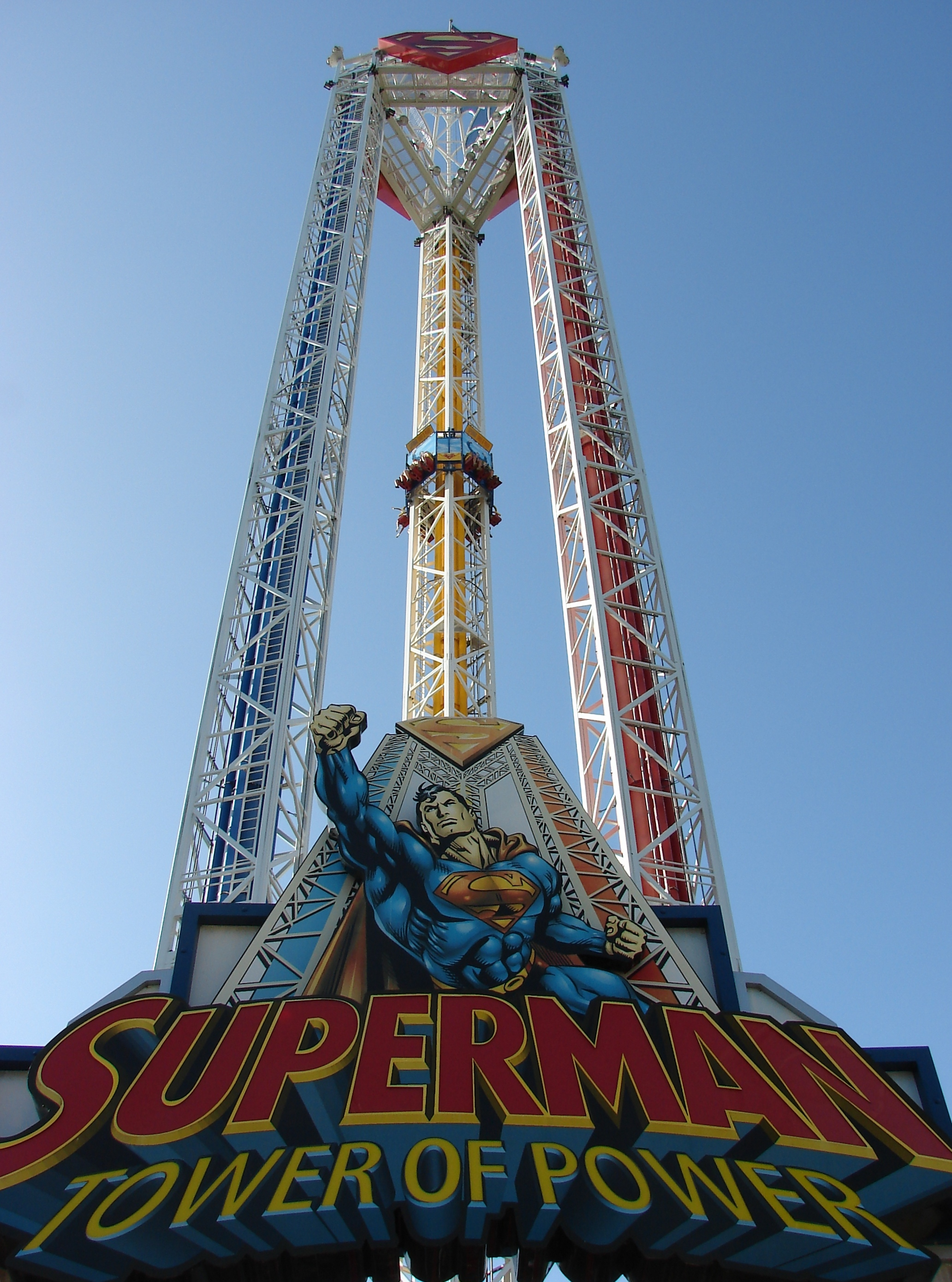

The Tower Section opened in 1969 and is named after the Oil Derrick tower location in the section.

Ride	Manufacturer	Year opened	Description
Superman: Tower of Power	S&S Worldwide	2003	Drop Tower
Caddo Lake Barge	Zamperla	2006	A Rockin’ Tug ride.
Dive Bomber Alley	Sky Fun 1	1996	A Skycoaster attraction. Extra Charge
Oil Derrick	Intamin	1969	An Observation tower.
Roaring Rapids	Intamin	1983	A River rapids ride.
Six Flags Speedway Go Karts		1999	A Go Karts attraction. Extra Charge

== Former attractions ==
Ride Name	Opened	Closed	Type	Former location	Notes
Los Conquistadores Mule Pack Ride Coronado Trek	1961	1962		Spain	Although titled "mule pack ride," guests actually rode burros and were led by a host dressed as conquistador, riding a horse.
Las Cocheses Cabras Goat Cart	1961	1963		Mexico	Goat powered cart ride
La Cucaracha	1961	1964	Allan Herschell, Wild Mouse	Mexico	Originally named Sidewinder and was located in the USA section in 1961. Name changed and moved to Mexico section in 1962.
Overland Butterfield Stagecoach	1961	1967	Stagecoach	Old South	
Sky Hook	1963	1968	Sky Crane	Boomtown	An observation ride adapted from a cargo crane by Von Roll of Switzerland. Relocated to Six Flags Over Georgia in 1969, then relocated to Magic Springs in 1978.
Little Dixie Carousel	1961	1974	Animal Powered Carousel	Old South	Also known as Flying Jenny
Tower Slide	1969	1976	Fun Slide	Tower	
Ferrocarril Fiesta Train	1961	1978	Train Ride	Mexico	
Big Bend	1971	1979	Schwarzkopf, Speed Racer	USA	A first-of-its-kind Schwarzkopf roller coaster. Another example of the model is the Whizzer at Six Flags Great America that still operates today, and a clone of the ride formerly operated at California's Great America.
Humble's Happy Motoring Freeway Track I & II	1961/2	1979 (Track I); 1986 (Track II)	Arrow Development, Sports Cars	USA	
Astro-Lift	1961	1980	Von Roll type 101 aerial ropeway		
Crazy Legs	1973	1980	Eyerly Aircraft Monster		
LaSalle's Riverboat Expedition	1961	1982	Guided Old Mill	France	
Skull Island	1961	1982	Playground	Skull Island	
Caddo War Canoes	1962	1983	Canoe Ride	Boomtown	
Cinesphere Chevy Show	1969	1984	Cinema 180	Old South	
Rotoriculous	1975	1988	Reverchon, Himalaya	Goodtimes Square	
Spindletop	1967	1989	Chance Rides, Rotor	Present-day Tower; Texas	Relocated to Frontier City as Terrible Twister (renamed Tumbleweed in 2014), where it operated from 1992 until 2019.
Spinnaker	1977	1995	Schwarzkopf GmbH, Enterprise	Tower	
Great Six Flags Air Racer	1984	1999	Intamin, Air Racer	Tower	
Missile Chaser	1961 (version 1); 2000 (version 2)	1977 (version 1); 2002 (version 2)	Eli Bridge Company, Scrambler	USA; Tower/Texas	Version two on the present site of Superman: Tower of Power for one season before moving near Titan; moved to Six Flags Magic Mountain to replace its damaged model
Bumper Cars	1973	2007		Goodtimes Square	
SpongeBob SquarePants: The Ride	2004	2007	motion simulator	USA	
Fly Me to the Moon	2008		motion simulator	USA	
Wildcatter	1982	2007	Intamin, Freefall	Boomtown	Previously known as G-Force and Texas Cliffhanger. Closed in September 2007. Demolished with explosives on October 2, 2007.
Flashback	1989	2012	Vekoma, Boomerang	Goodtimes Square	It was closed on September 3, 2012. Ride relocated to Six Flags St. Louis, re-opened in 2013 as Boomerang.
Texas Chute Out	1976	2012	Intamin, Parachute Tower	Goodtimes Square	Closed on September 3, 2012. Demolished with explosives on October 10, 2012. Replaced by SkyScreamer.
Bugs Bunny's Spirit of St. Louie	1976	2013	Zamperla, mini airplane ride	Looney Tunes USA	Stylized as "Spirit of St. Looie"
Daffy Duck's Capitol Tours	2001	2013	SBF/VISA group, kiddie crazy bus ride	Looney Tunes USA	
Michigan J. Frog's Tinsel Town Revue	1985	2013	Zamperla, mini swing ride	Looney Tunes USA	
Route 66 Bumper Cars	2001	2013	SBF/VISA group, mini bumper cars	Looney Tunes USA	
ACME Rock-n-Rocket	2006	2014	Intamin, Looping Starship	USA	Closed on August 24, 2014. Replaced by Justice League: Battle for Metropolis.
Harley Quinn Spinsanity	2006	2018	Huss, Troika	Goodtimes Square	Operated as Crazy Legs from 2006 to 2016.
Aquaman Splashdown	1987	2019	Hopkins Rides, Shoot-the-Chutes	USA	Operated as Splash Water Falls from 1987 to 2007.
Harley Quinn Spinsanity	2018	2022	ABC Rides, Tourbillon	Gotham City	
Sylvester & Tweety's State Fair-is Wheel	2001	2022	Zamperla	Bugs Bunny Boomtown	A Mini Ferris wheel.
Yosemite Sam's Texas Tea Cups	2001	2024	SBF/VISA	Bugs Bunny Boomtown	A mini Teacups.
El Diablo	2019	2024	Larson Giga Loop	Spain	A 100 feet (30 m) tall Giga Loop. The ride was planned to open in the tower section as "Lone Star Revolution".
La Vibora	1986	2024	Intamin/Swiss Bob roller coaster	Spain	Originally located at Six Flags Magic Mountain where it debuted in 1984 as Sarajevo Bobsleds, the bobsled roller coaster was later relocated to Six Flags Over Texas. The roller coaster operated at the park from 1986 to 2024.
Conquistador	1981	2025	Intamin Bounty swinging ship.	Spain	
Turbo Bungy			Bungee trampoline		
Helicopter Rides			helicopter tours above the park		
Jet Set			Intamin Mini Jet		Intamin's very first ride.
Petting Zoo					
Porky Pig Magic Wheel			Eli Bridge Company, Ferris wheel	Looney Tunes USA	
