= Aquaman (disambiguation) =

Aquaman is a DC Comics superhero.

Aquaman may also refer to:

== Related to the DC Comics character ==
- Aquaman (film), a 2018 American film
  - Aquaman (soundtrack), a soundtrack album from the film
- Aquaman (TV pilot), a 2006 American television pilot
- Aquaman (TV series), a 1967 American television series
- Aquaman: Battle for Atlantis, a 2003 console video game
- Aquaman: Power Wave, a roller coaster at Six Flags Over Texas
- Steven Adams, basketball player, whose nickname is Aquaman or Aquamane

== Other uses ==
- Aqua Man, a fictional character in the video game Mega Man 8
