= Mini Mine Train =

Mini Mine Train can refer to:

- Mini Mine Train (Six Flags Over Texas), a kiddie roller coaster located at Six Flags Over Texas in Arlington, Texas
- Mini Mine Train (Six Flags Over Georgia), a defunct roller coaster at Six Flags Over Georgia in Cobb County, Georgia
