= Six Flags & Texas Railroad =

Amusement park heritage railroad

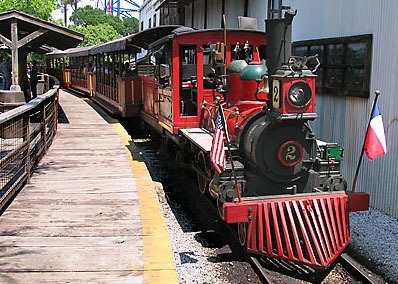
- The Red Train; Mirabeau B. Lamar; 2-4-2

Overview
- Locale: Six Flags Over Texas
- Dates of operation: 1961–present

Technical
- Track gauge: 3 ft (914 mm)
- Length: one mile (1.6 km)

The Six Flags & Texas Railroad is an amusement park heritage railroad and the only attraction still operating from the inaugural 1961 season of Six Flags Over Texas in Arlington, Texas. Two steam locomotives transport guests on a one-mile (1.6 km) journey around the park with stops at two stations.

== History ==
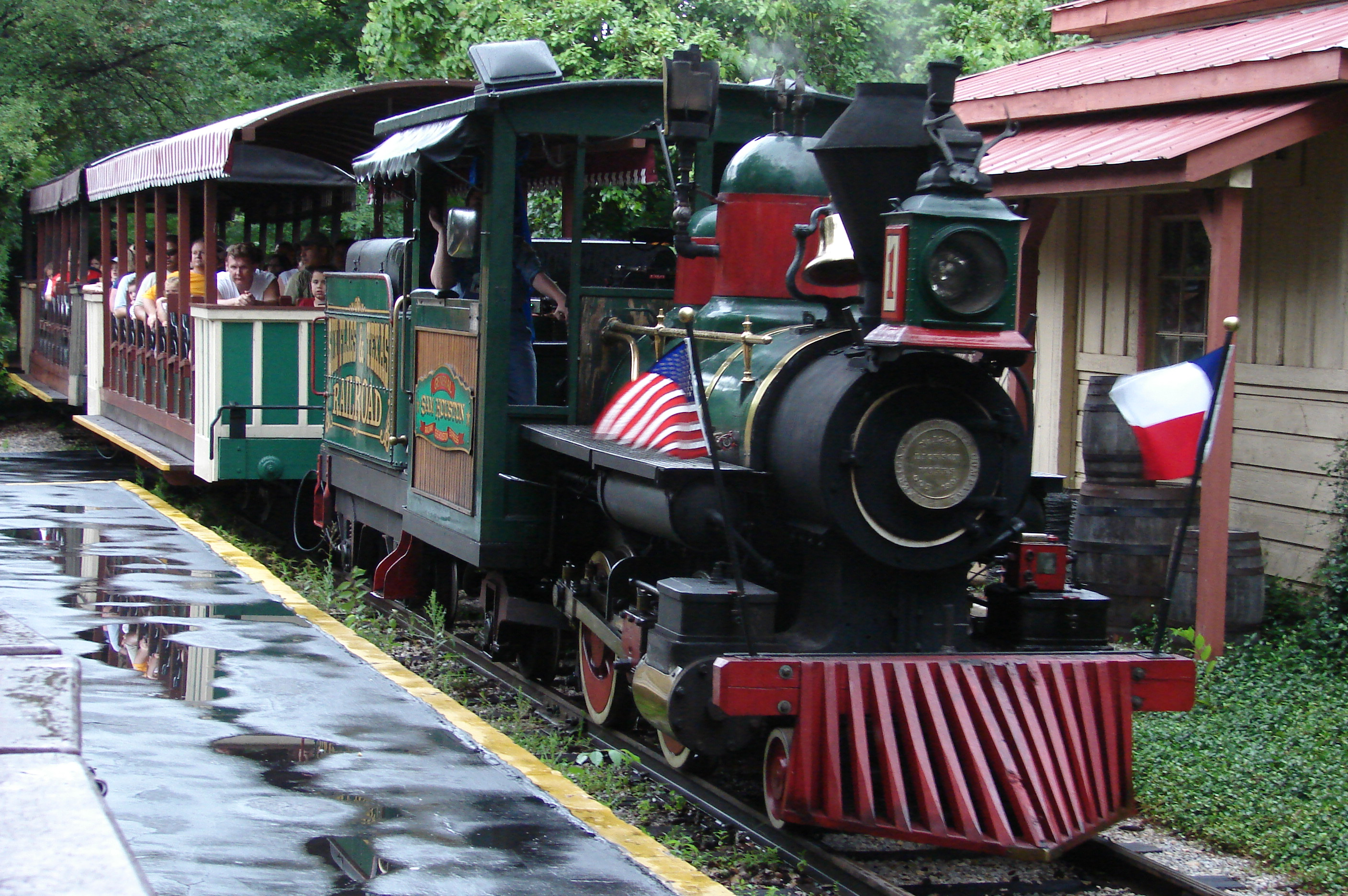
The Green Train General Sam Houston, 2-4-2

Both locomotives on the Six Flags & Texas Railroad were originally built at the turn of the century for the Enterprise sugar cane plantation in Louisiana. Engine #1, known as the Green Train (due to its color scheme) or the Mary Ann, was built in 1901 by the Cooke Locomotive and Machine Works, which later became part of the American Locomotive Company (ALCO). The smaller engine #2, known as the Red Train or Lydia, was created for the plantation in 1897 by H.K. Porter, Inc.

After leasing them Charles Regan MANLY Ltd. in Louisiana, the engines were rebuilt by Six Flags for $50,000 each. The Mary Ann was renamed the General Sam Houston and the Lydia was renamed the Mirabeau B. Lamar in honor of these Texan heroes. The rebuilding also involved several changes, such as redesigning the locomotives' fireboxes to burn oil instead of coal and wood, as well as the addition of leading wheels and trailing wheels. Photos of the original engines can be found at the train station in the 'Texas' section of the park. The name of the Six Flags & Texas Railroad is said to have been coined by the original engineers hired for the opening season in 1961, who were all retired from the Texas & Pacific Railway. In 1982, the Red train was renamed to the Charles Jefferson Patton in honor of a retired Texas & Pacific Railway engineer that worked at the park from 1961 to 1981. The Green train was also renamed for a time in honor of past CEO and President of Six Flags, Larry B. Cochran, but has since been returned to its original name, General Sam Houston.

The railroad continues to run at the park daily, operating much the same as it did over 50 years ago when the attraction first opened. Six Flags maintains the trains as close as possible to their original specifications. In fact, despite a popular movement to transform theme park railroad engines from steam-powered to the newer diesel-powered trains for lower maintenance and operating costs, Six Flags Over Texas has resisted, in favor of a more authentic experience. The two locomotives at sister park Six Flags Over Georgia, the Texas and the General, had diesel engines mounted in their tenders in 2005 and were no longer run as steam locomotives.

== See also ==
- Grapevine Vintage Railroad
- Rail transport in Walt Disney Parks and Resorts
