= Oil Derrick (Six Flags Over Texas) =

Observation tower

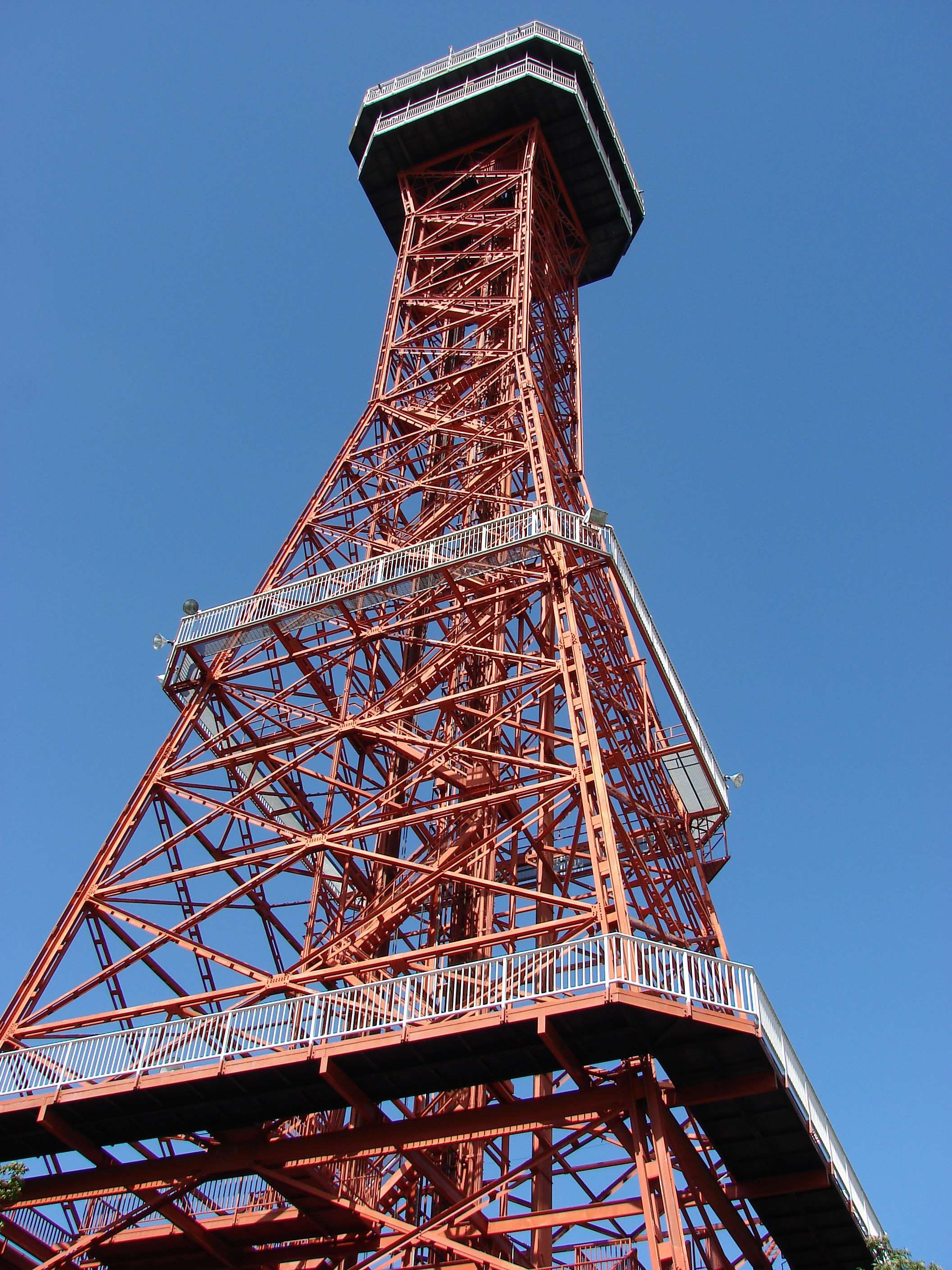

Six Flags Over Texas
- Area: Tower
- Coordinates: 32.758028°N 97.071162°W
- Status: Operating
- Opening date: May 24, 1969

Ride statistics
- Attraction type: Observation Tower
- Manufacturer: Intamin
- Height: 300 ft (91 m)
- Capacity: 2000 riders per hour
- Vehicles: 2
- Riders per vehicle: 50

The Six Flags Over Texas Oil Derrick is a 300-foot (91 m) tall observation tower and an attraction at the theme park Six Flags Over Texas. Six Flags claims it to be the world's tallest land-based oil derrick (although it is actually not functional as such, and never has been). When the tower opened, it had a twelve-lane slide, attached at the first balcony level (50 ft), on which riders could slide down using burlap bags. With two elevators holding 50 people each, the attraction has a capacity of 2000 riders per hour. The tower served as a replacement for the former Sky Hook attraction.
