= Arrow Development =

Amusement park ride designer and manufacturer

- Industry: Amusement Rides
- Founded: 1945
- Founders: Karl Bacon; Ed Morgan; Bill Hardiman; Angus Anderson
- Defunct: 1981
- Fate: Sold to Huss Maschinenfabrik (1981)
- Successors: Arrow-Huss; Arrow Dynamics; S&S Power
- Headquarters: Mountain View, California, US
- Key people: Angus Anderson; Karl Bacon; Bill Hardiman; Ed Morgan; Walter Schulze; Ron Toomer
- Products: Roller Coasters, Log Flumes, Auto Rides
- Number of employees: 270

Arrow Development was an amusement park ride and roller coaster design and manufacturing company, incorporated in California on November 16, 1945, and based in Mountain View. It was founded by Angus "Andy" Anderson, Karl Bacon, William Hardiman and Edgar Morgan. Originally located at 243 Moffett Boulevard, it moved to a larger facility at 1555 Plymouth Street after Walt Disney Productions purchased one third of the business in 1960. Arrow also had offices at 820 Huff Avenue.

By 1956, then secretary Bill Hardiman and Angus Anderson, then vice president, had sold their interests in Arrow to Wharton graduate Walter Schulze, who then became Arrow's secretary-treasurer and vice president. Schulze and his wife had provided accounting services for several small companies in the Bay Area, including Duro-Bond Bearing, which is where he likely heard of Arrow. Schulze left Arrow after its sale to Rio Grande Industries. In 1979, Arrow listed over a dozen types of rides in their catalog, including 15 corkscrews, five looping coasters, 12 runaway mine trains, 43 flume rides, and 77 automotive rides, for a total of more than 200 rides installed at nearly 100 locations around the world.

Huss Trading Corporation purchased Arrow Development in 1981, but the combined Arrow-Huss went bankrupt in 1984. The similarly named Arrow Dynamics, eventual successor to Arrow Development, was incorporated in Delaware on January 10, 1986 by Ron Toomer, Otis Hughes, David Klomp, Ray Crandall and Brent Meikle.

== History ==
=== Early years (1945–1953) ===
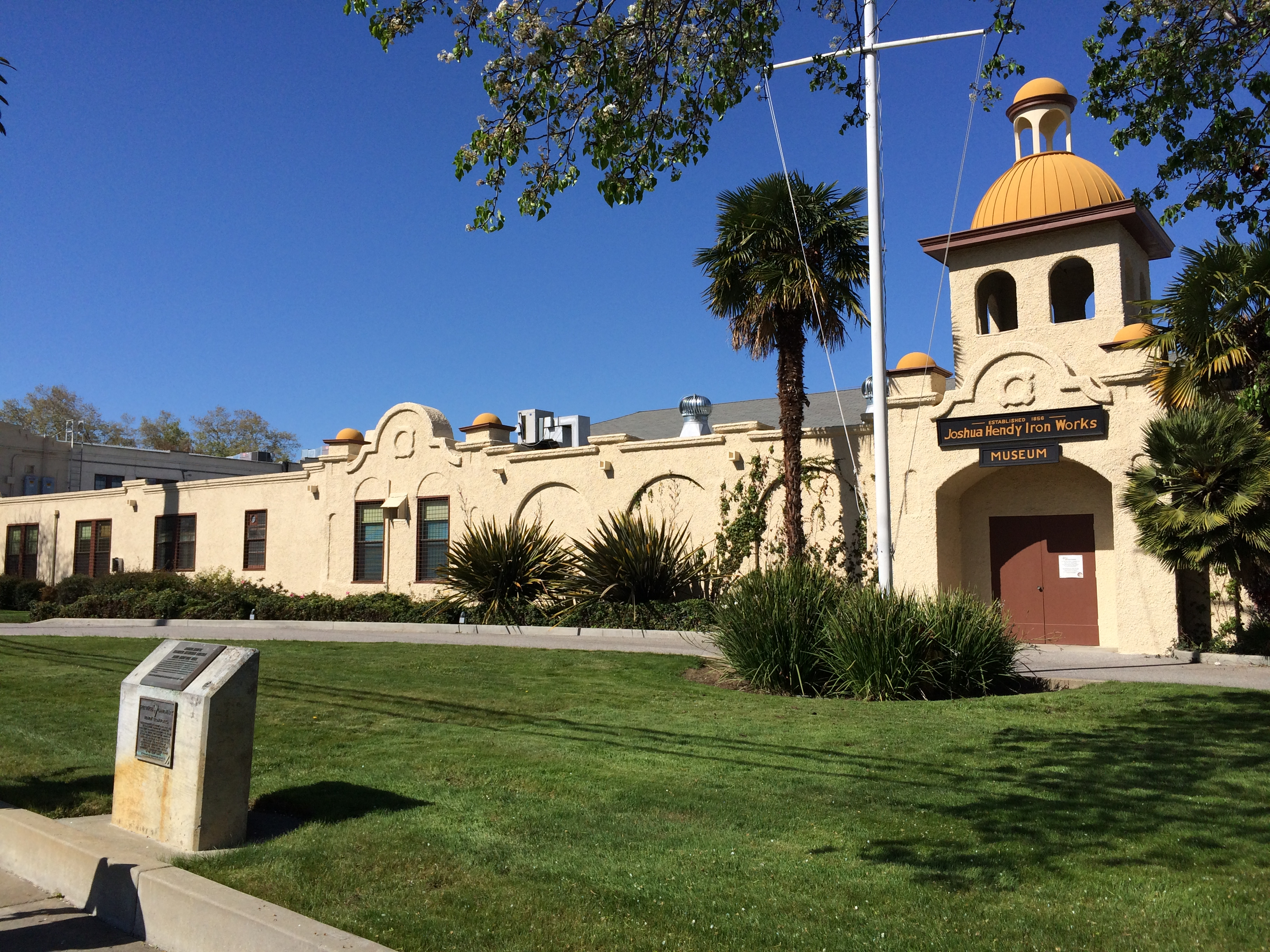
Exterior of Hendy Iron Works (now a museum) in Sunnyvale, 2014.

Andy, Bill, Ed and Karl met while working at the Hendy Iron Works in Sunnyvale, CA. The Hendy company had a contract with the US Navy to build torpedo launchers and marine steam engines. By 1942, Hendy was building hundreds of marine engines for Liberty ships. The number of employees increased to over 11,500 to meet demand. In June 1943, the union began enforcing a four-month ban on overtime, during which all machinists were to quit work after eight hours and refuse to work on Sundays. Hendy responded by announcing that all machinists who refused to work overtime would be discharged. Both Karl and Ed would recall later that being told to be on the picket line motivated them to start their own company.

Neither Bacon nor Morgan saw active duty in the military, although Ed and his younger brother Eugene enlisted in the Army Air Corps. Ed was given a deferment based on his employment at Hendy. Eugene was killed in action in the South Pacific on December 16, 1944, while serving with the 868th Bombardment Squadron, flying special radar equipped B-24 Liberators designed for secret night bombing and escort missions.

During the early years, Arrow Development sold used machine tools and made replacement parts for trucks, which were scarce after the war. Their first big job was building test run-in furnaces for the US Navy. They also performed machining and assembly work for Luscombe, Hewlett-Packard in the 1950s, and the Stanford Linear Accelerator Center in the 1960s. Arrow helped the NASA Ames Research Center develop 25 balloon-suspended capsules for high altitude research with monkeys, in preparation for the Mercury Program.

Morgan, Bacon, and Schulze are credited with building the carousel originally installed at Alum Rock Park in 1947. By 1950, Arrow Development was known locally for its manufacture of carousels and other small amusement rides.

=== Contributions to Disneyland and Walt Disney World ===
Ed Morgan read a newspaper article about Disneyland and wrote to Disney about a small stern wheel paddle boat named “Lil’ Belle”, which Arrow had built in 1952. Disney wasn’t interested in the boat, but became interested in the vehicles that Arrow was creating for other amusement parks. Imagineer Bruce Bushman gave Ed Morgan a sketch of the "Mr. Toad" vehicle, and a prototype body was quickly fabricated. Morgan would later recall that Arrow landed their contract with Disney through the recommendation of Stanford Research Institute which did the site and population density research for Disneyland. Walt and Roy Disney had consulted with Harrison Price of SRI’s Los Angeles office on a proposal to build Disneyland in Burbank, California.

Between 1953 and 1971 Arrow would be instrumental in designing and developing over a dozen ride systems and vehicles for Disney and were awarded multiple patents for their designs. Six of the opening day rides at Disneyland were built by Arrow; Mad Tea Party, King Arthur Carrousel, Mr. Toad's Wild Ride, Dumbo the Flying Elephant, Casey Jr. Circus Train, and Snow White's Scary Adventures.

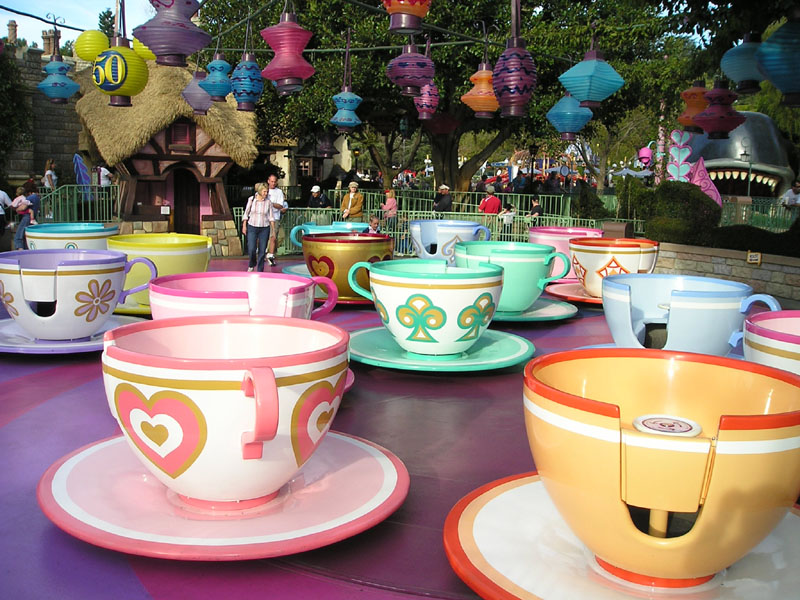
Mad Tea Party (2006)

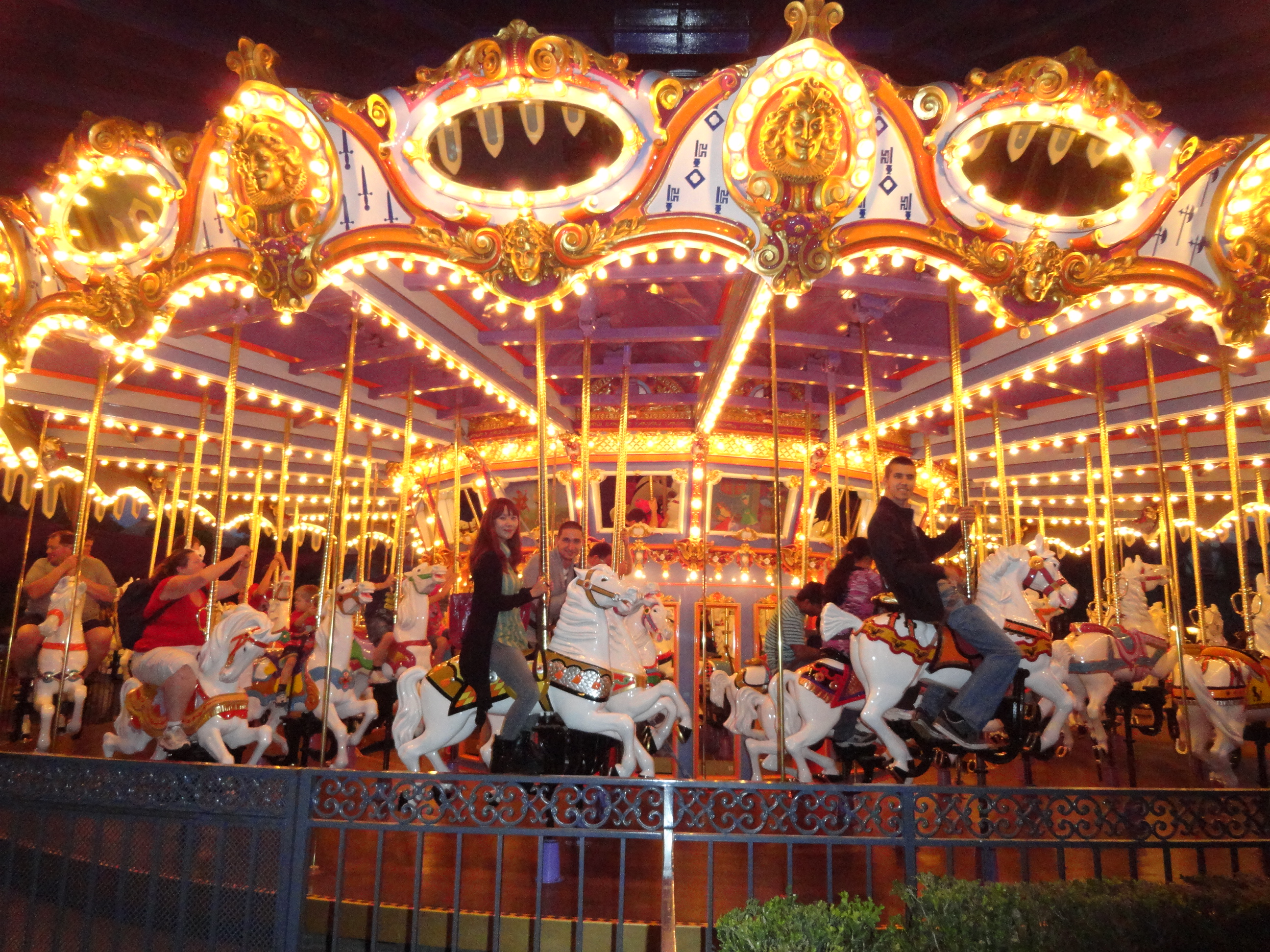
King Arthur Carrousel (2011)

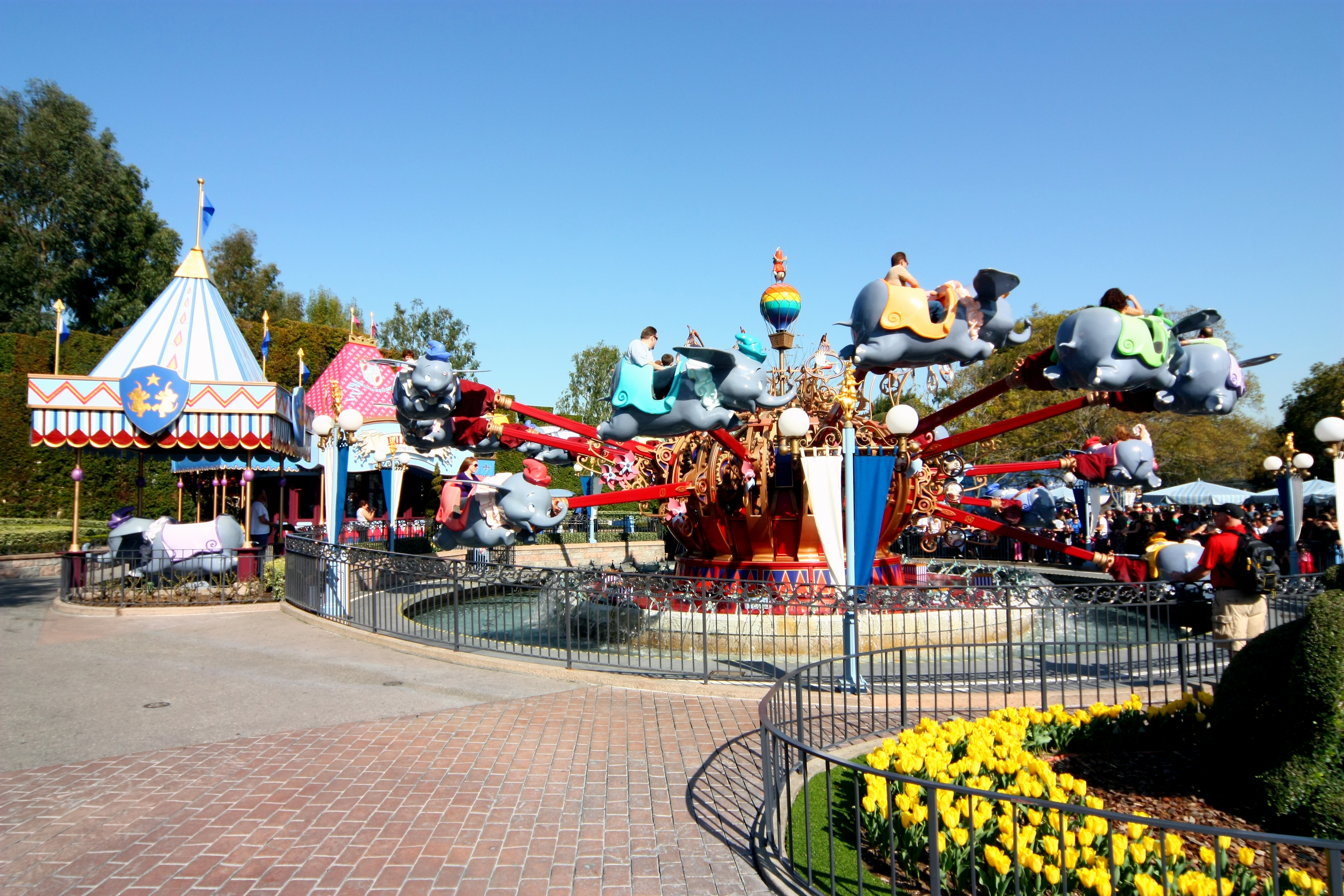
Dumbo the Flying Elephant (2010)

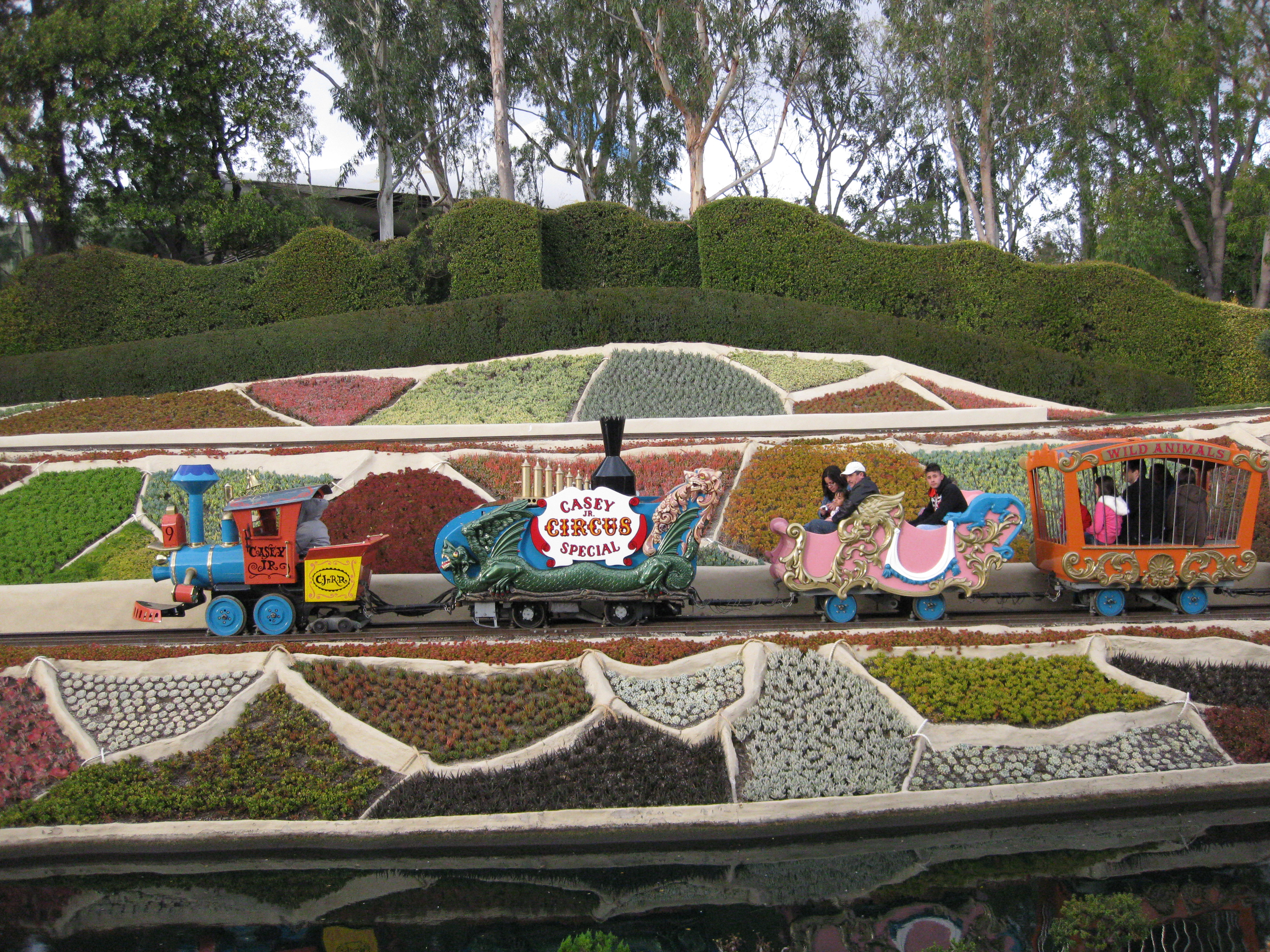
Casey Jr. Circus Train (2009)

Arrow went on to design and build vehicles and track systems for the Midget Autopia and Motorboat Cruise (1957), Alice in Wonderland (1958), the Matterhorn Bobsleds (1959), Flying Saucers (1961) and the Mark VI redesign of Autopia cars (1963). The tram cars which carried guests from the parking lot to the park's entrance at Disneyland and Disney World were another Arrow Product. They also designed and built the ride systems for It's a Small World (1964/66), Pirates of the Caribbean, Adventure Through Inner Space (1967), and the Haunted Mansion (1969). Arrow has also been credited for improving the guidance system for the Submarine Voyage (1959) and prototyping a four-track version of Space Mountain for Walt Disney World in Orlando.

Dana Morgan, the son of co-founder Ed Morgan, recalled that Arrow was involved in fourteen of the Walt Disney World attractions, including Dumbo the Flying Elephant and Peter Pan, Pirates of the Caribbean, the parking lot trams, Sky Buckets and the Prince Charming Carousel. The last ride system Arrow may have worked on for Walt Disney World would have been Big Thunder Mountain Railroad, which opened November 15, 1980, two months before the merger with HUSS Maschinenfabrik which formed Arrow-Huss.

=== Non-Disney rides ===
The 1947 carousel at Alum Rock was later moved to the Happy Hollow Park & Zoo in 1964, where it still operates as the King Neptune's Carousel. Karl and Ed also set up a separate company called Easbey which won a contract with the city of Oakland, California, to install rides at the Children's Fairyland at Lake Merritt, which was built in 1950. The Flecto Carousel was built by Arrow in 1950, although it was not installed at Fairyland until 2002.

In 1955, Arrow built a demonstration children's park called Playtown, next to Palo Alto's Town and Country Village Shopping Center, where they demonstrated new rides including a miniature train, boat, "Arrow-plane," and carousel. They also had a demonstration park across the bay near San Leandro and another in Los Altos.

On August 21, 1960, a tragic accident occurred at Playtown involving the son of Frank Freidel, a visiting professor at Stanford, known for his extensive biography of Franklin Roosevelt. While Frank's wife Madeleine was buying tickets for the miniature train ride, their 3 1/2 year old son Phillip wandered off, sat down on the tracks and was hit by the train, suffering massive head and leg injuries. He was pronounced dead on arrival at the Palo Alto-Stanford Hospital. Playtown closed soon after.

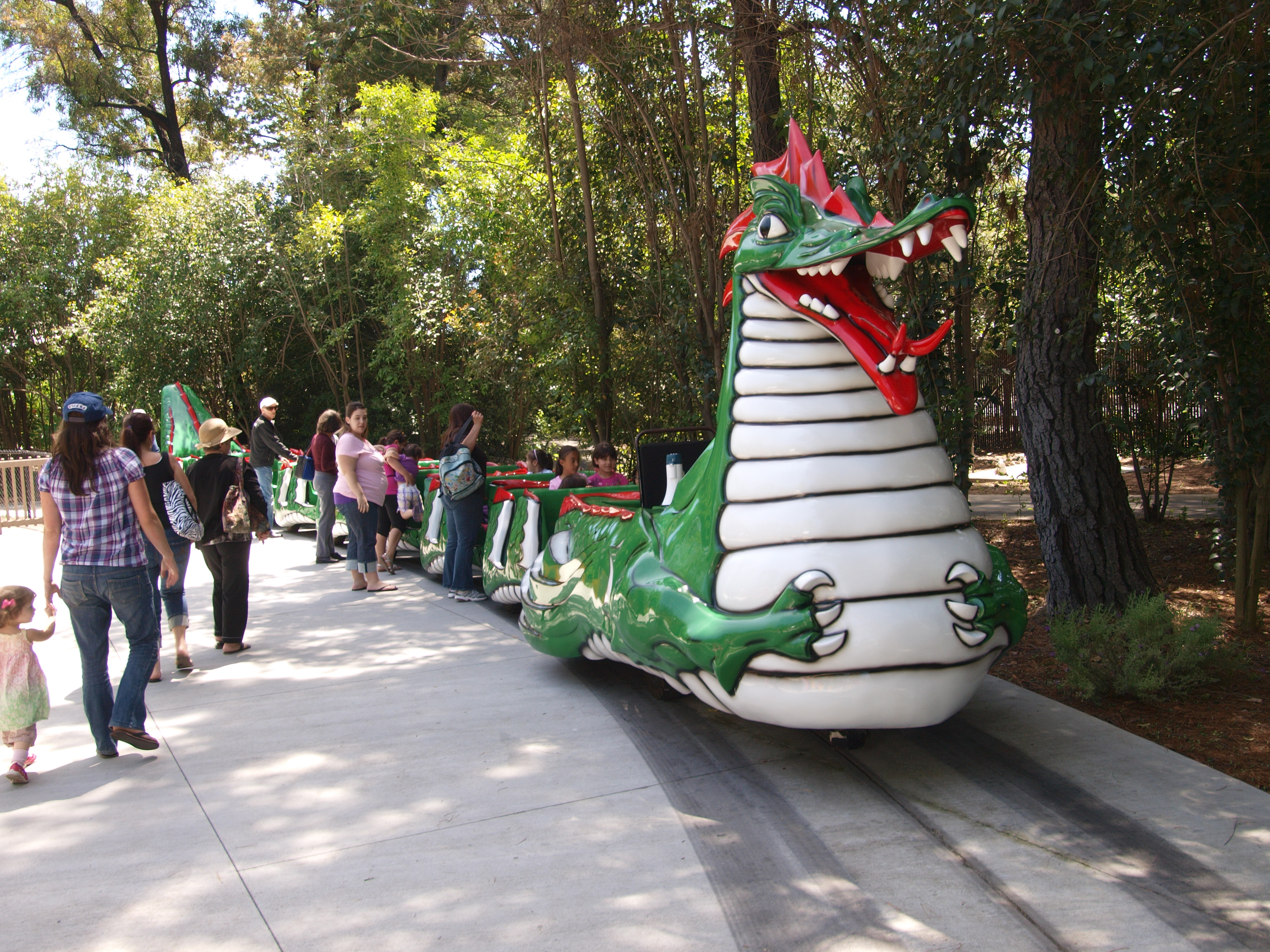
Danny the Dragon guided train at Happy Hollow Park & Zoo, San Jose

Arrow developed the Mystery Island Banana Train ride for Pacific Ocean Park, which was one of the opening-day rides in 1958. Arrow also developed an extensive Alice in Wonderland ride for Blackpool Pleasure Beach, which opened in 1961. For the 1962 Seattle World's Fair, Arrow created the "Space Whirl", a teacup ride which simulated the feeling of being launched into space.

For Freedomland U.S.A., located in New York City from 1960 to 1964, Arrow created four dark rides (Earthquake, Buccaneer, Tornado and Mine Cave), Spin-A-Top (similar to Disneyland's Mad Tea Party), horse-drawn street cars, antique cars (known as Horseless Carriage) and freeway cars for the Satellite City Turnpike. Arrow's contributions to the park are documented in Freedomland U.S.A.: The Definitive History published by Theme Park Press (2019). Arrow also created the Danny the Dragon train ride (two trains) for Freedomland and Happy Hollow (1961), the Cave Train and vintage auto rides for the Santa Cruz Beach Boardwalk and Adventureland (New York), teacup ("snowball") and bobsled rides for Santa's Village in Scotts Valley, CA, Frontier Village's Antique Car Ride, the Timber Mountain Log and Hat Dance ("Sombrero") rides at Knott's Berry Farm, a suspended monorail and electric boat ride for the Anheuser-Busch brewery in Van Nuys, CA and Florida and an omnimover type ride for Hershey's Chocolate World Great American Chocolate Tour.

Arrow reinvented and improved on the flume ride which had been popular in the early 1900s. The first modern log flume ride being El Aserradero at Six Flags Over Texas which opened in 1963. The Runaway Mine Train (1966), designed by Ron Toomer, was both the first mine train roller coaster and the first roller coaster with an underwater tunnel. Arrow's second mine train ride opened at Six Flags Over Georgia in 1967, followed by another at Cedar Point in 1969. Arrow Development would build 22 flume rides between 1970 and 1975. Toomer was promoted to Manager of Engineering at Arrow Development in 1971.

Arrow's 1979 brochure listed 32 roller coasters, 12 Runaway Mine Trains, 43 Flume rides, 5 "Space Whirl" rides, 4 Rub-a-Dubs, 7 Dark Rides, 20 Special Systems, 49 Antique Car and 28 Sports Car ride installations. Arrow's 1979 product brochure also listed eight Merry-Go-Rounds, mostly installed in California, ranging from 20 to 60 feet (6.10 to 18.29 m) in diameter.

=== Post Disney era transition into Arrow Dynamics and S&S Arrow ===
When Disney opened Central Shops in 1971, Dick Nunis, then Executive VP, told Arrow, “I have to admit that we could not have done this without you. But it’s over now. We built this big facility and we’re going to do everything ourselves.” Dana Morgan recalled, “They made it very clear that it was a new era—that they now had all this in-house capability built up, and they would now do everything themselves.”

In 1972, Bacon, Morgan and Schulze decided to sell Arrow Development to Rio Grande Industries. Rio Grande had plans to build several theme parks, in addition to owning a coaster-building company. Carl and Ed acted as consultants to RGI for a few years. Walter Schultz sold all his RGI stock and retired shortly after the acquisition. All of the projects that were submitted during that time were rejected by RGI management, although they were often developed later by other companies. Ron Toomer stated that "building roller coasters really didn't fit into Rio Grande's scheme of things". In 1977, Arrow opened a 120,000-square-foot (11,000 m^{2}) manufacturing facility in the Freeport Center in Clearfield, Utah. By 1980, they were no longer operating in Mountain View.

On November 22, 1981, Huss Trading Corporation bought Arrow Development from RGI. The new company registered in Utah as Arrow-Huss, with design and administrative offices in Scott's Valley, CA. Edgar Morgan's son Dana, was President, Robert Peers was a Director and Secretary and Peter Joyce was Vice President and Treasurer. Arrow-Huss registered with the State of California as a Foreign Stock business on January 12, 1981, but its status as a valid company was eventually forfeited. Dana Morgan would be reported as President of Arrow Huss in 1982. Morgan left Arrow-Huss and started Morgan Manufacturing in 1983, nominally to build carousels, although their first contract was for a roller coaster. In 1984, Arrow-Huss' officers were reported as Bernard Peer Zwickau, President; Boyd Draeger Vice President; Robert Peers, Secretary; Gail E. Dyreng, Comptroller. Klaus Huss, Dr. Urs. Affolter and Robert Peers were reported as Directors. In 1985, Robert Larsen was the Director of Finance.

Arrow-Huss filed for bankruptcy late in November 1984, two weeks after Ron Toomer had relocated his family to Utah. Thirteen of the company’s American officers, including Toomer, negotiated a buyout. Late in 1985 the takeover was approved by the court. By that time none of the original founders of Arrow Development had any financial or managerial interest in the company. On January 10, 1986, Arrow Dynamics was incorporated in Delaware, with offices in Clearfield, Utah, and Norm Scott as President. Scott would die unexpectedly on July 1 of that same year.

Around this time (mid-80's) Arrow partnered with Vekoma, a Dutch manufacturer of farming and mining equipment, in an effort to have a dealer in the European market. Initially, Arrow built ride vehicles and the more complex track sections in Utah and shipped them to Holland. Over a period of several months Arrow taught Vekoma to build all types of track sections for their European customers. Vekoma then began competing directly with Arrow in the United States.

On January 6, 1986, restated articles of incorporation, changing the name of Arrow Huss to Arrow Dynamics, Inc. were filed in Delaware. On March 10, 1987, Ron Toomer, Otis S. Hughes and Brent H. Meikle would file an application for certification of authority for Arrow Dynamics, Inc., also in Delaware.

On May 27, 1987, Toomer, Hughes and Meikle would draft articles of incorporation for Arrow Dynamics as a Utah corporation. Issued stock was valued at $12 million. On June 27, 1987, Arrow Dynamics, Inc. (Utah) and Arrow Dynamics, Inc. (Delaware) would merge, with the Delaware corporation surviving. On February 22, 1988, Arrow Dynamics, Inc. would be dissolved as a Delaware corporation. The April 11, 1988, notice also states that the former name of Arrow Dynamics was Arrow Huss, Inc. In a 1988 interview, Toomer would state that although Arrow Huss had been profitable, Huss "just kept taking money out of it".

Ron Toomer served as President of Arrow Dynamics until 1993. In 1994, he brought in $3.5 million in international funding and was promoted to chairman. Allan Harris was brought in as president about 1995 and was CEO in 1998. Toomer would act as a Consulting Director until his retirement in 1998. Arrow Dynamics' authority to operate in Utah would be revoked in October 1999 for failure to file their annual report, but be reinstated in November. Toomer retired in 2000.

Arrow Dynamics declared bankruptcy on December 3, 2001, owing more than $2.2 million to its 20 largest unsecured creditors. As part of its reorganization plan, Arrow agreed that it would no longer build its own rides. The court set a $2.25 million minimum price for the purchase of all of Arrow Dynamics assets. On February 8, 2002, the Cauldron for the 2002 Winter Olympic Games in Salt Lake City was lit. The steel tower supporting the cauldron was designed by Arrow Dynamics.

In 2002, S&S Power was looking for opportunities to expand their business, citing acquisitions as the best method to do so. In October, S&S founded S&S Arrow, a limited liability company which purchased the assets of the bankrupt Arrow Dynamics. Despite the name and work of S&S Arrow, legally it was not a successor to Arrow Dynamics.

In November 2012, Sansei Yusoki Co. Ltd, acquired controlling interest in S&S and renamed itself S&S Sansei Technologies. Sansei obtained all the remaining Arrow assets and intellectual property. On a related note; Sansei provides Disney with Omnimover ride systems for the Buzz Lightyear attractions and Little Mermaid: Ariel's Undersea Adventure attractions.

== Former properties ==
Arrow Development properties

The building at 243 Moffett in Mountain View, which was built in 1946 by the founders, was still standing in December 2013 and the site of an automotive body shop.

The 820 Huff address appears on documents created by Arrow for the Walt Disney Company. It is roughly two blocks north of 1555 Plymouth.

1555 Plymouth was occupied by Arrow Development from April 1960 until November 1980. During that time, the property was one parcel with the address of 1555 Plymouth Street.

South Bay Construction and Development Company (SBCDC) purchased the site in November 1982 and subdivided it into three parcels: 1555, 1615, and 1625 Plymouth Street. SBCDC constructed the building currently at 1555 Plymouth Street in 1983, which was used as storage for Norcal Tech, Inc. The property was sold to Sierra Greens in June 1985 and leased to Silicon Graphics, Inc.

1615 Plymouth - Interaction Chemical leased the 1615 Plymouth Street parcel from SBCDC beginning in December 1982. Interaction Chemical purchased the parcel in May 1983. In 1992, the assets of Interaction Chemical were purchased by Interaction Chromatography, who moved out of the building in May 1992. Fusion Medical Technologies began occupying the property in 1994.

1625 Plymouth - The property was also leased to Norcal from November 1982 to November 1989 and Symtron (who purchased Norcal) from November 1989 to November 1997. During this time, Norcal and Symtron manufactured printed circuit boards at the site. In November 1997, Sanmina Corporation acquired Symtron and subsequently purchased the property two years later in 1999.

On June 25, 2013, Broadreach Capital Partners announced that it had acquired the 5.2-acre (2.1 ha) site comprising 1615 and 1625 Plymouth, where it planned to develop, own and manage a state-of-the-art office project. Broadreach secured $150 million in financing and broke ground on the site in 2018. As of February 2020 the new building is 100% leased and occupied by Google.

== See also ==
- List of Arrow Development rides
