= La Vibora =

Steel bobsled roller coaster

- Previously known as Sarajevo Bobsleds at Magic Mountain, Avalanche at Over Texas
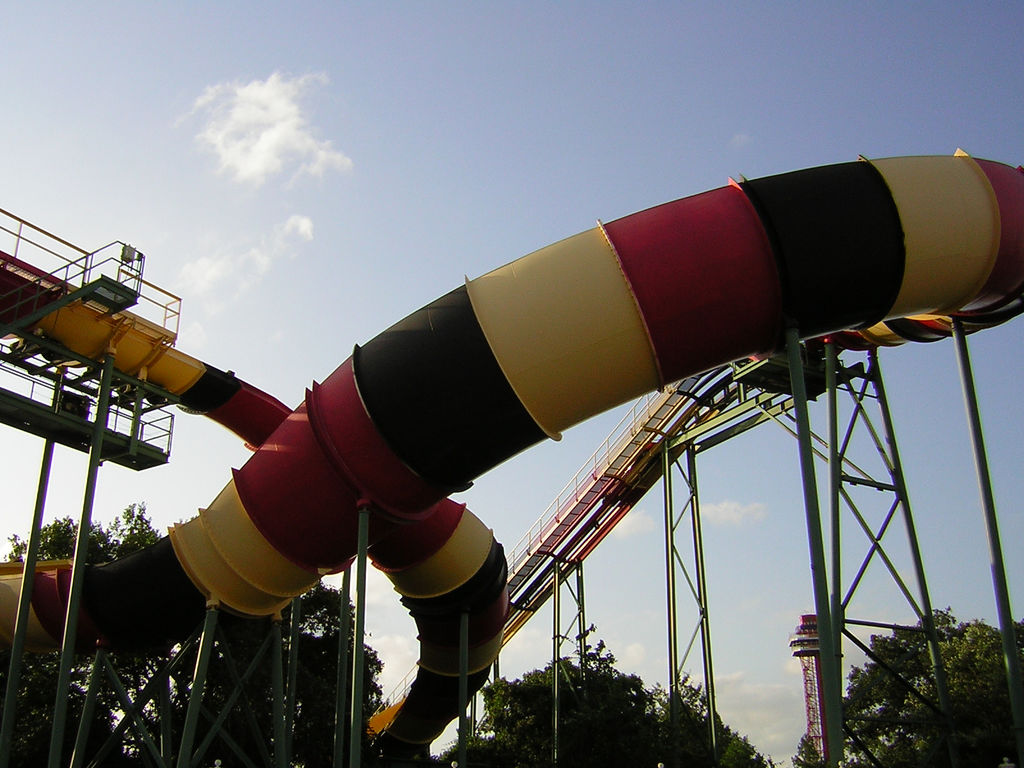

Six Flags Over Texas
- Park section: Mexico and Spain
- Coordinates: 32°45′18.43″N 97°4′19.34″W
- Status: Removed
- Opening date: 1986
- Closing date: 2024
- Cost: $9 million
- Replaced by: Tormenta Rampaging Run

Six Flags Magic Mountain
- Coordinates: 34.427°N 118.597°W
- Status: Removed
- Opening date: 1984
- Closing date: 1985
- Replaced by: Shockwave

General statistics
- Type: Steel
- Manufacturer: Intamin
- Model: Swiss Bob
- Height: 60 ft (18 m)
- Length: 1,490 ft (450 m)
- Speed: 32 mph (51 km/h)
- Inversions: 0
- Duration: 1:30
- Capacity: 600-675 riders per hour
- Height restriction: 42 in (107 cm)
- Flash Pass was Available
- Single rider line was available, removed after 2022
- La Vibora at RCDB

La Vibora (The Viper) was a steel bobsled roller coaster at Six Flags Over Texas in Arlington, Texas, United States. The roller coaster had operated at the park from 1986 to 2024.

== History ==
The ride's cars do not run on conventional tubular rails, but instead travel through a winding half-pipe trough that emulates the experience of riding a bobsled. In keeping with the Texas location the theme was changed from an alpine bobsled ride to a snake theme. The name La Vibora translated to English is The Viper. The coaster's life began at Six Flags Magic Mountain under the name Sarajevo Bobsleds, being named in honor of the 1984 olympics and the ride opened that same year. However, the ride was part of Six Flags' (now defunct) Ride Rotation Program, and the coaster lasted two seasons at Magic Mountain and closed in 1985. That same year the ride ceased operation, the plot of land where the bobsleds stood was reused and housed Batman The Escape (known as Shockwave at Magic Mountain), another roller coaster manufactured by Intamin and the ride was relocated to Six Flags Over Texas and opened as the Avalanche Bobsled in 1986. The ride was later renamed La Vibora and painted to resemble a snake to better match the theme of the Spain section of the park.

The karts/trains that ride on La Vibora are originally from the Bob Track in Efteling.

La Vibora permanently closed during the 2024 season, without prior announcement. It will be replaced with a Dive Coaster. It was later confirmed to be Tormenta Rampaging Run.

With the closure of La Vibora, no Intamin Swiss Bob models remain in operation.
