= Runaway Mine Train (Six Flags Over Texas) =

Steel roller coaster

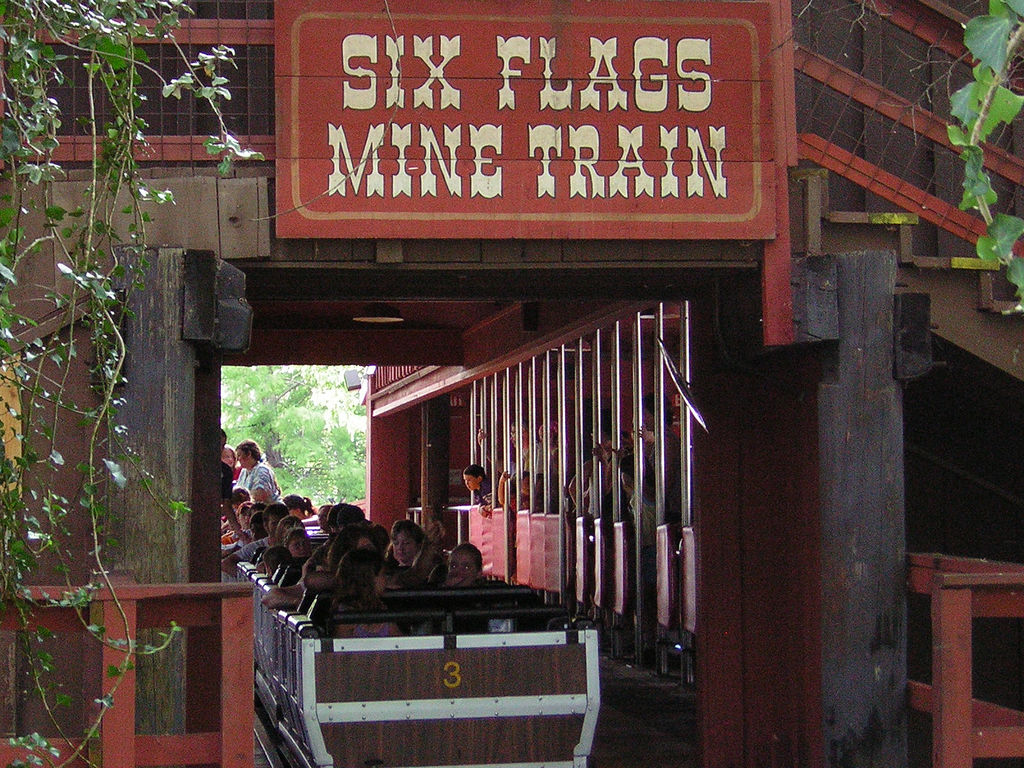
- The station of the attraction

Six Flags Over Texas
- Location: Six Flags Over Texas
- Park section: Boomtown
- Coordinates: 32.758465°N 97.068487°W
- Status: Operating
- Opening date: July 23, 1966
- Cost: $1,000,000

General statistics
- Type: Steel
- Manufacturer: Arrow Development
- Model: Mine Train
- Lift/launch system: Chain
- Height: 35 ft (11 m)
- Length: 2,400 ft (730 m)
- Speed: 35 mph (56 km/h)
- Inversions: 0
- Duration: 3:10
- Capacity: 2010 riders per hour
- Height restriction: 48 in (122 cm)
- Trains: 3 trains with 5 cars; riders arranged 2 across in 3 rows for a total of 30 riders per train
- Fast Lane available
- Runaway Mine Train at RCDB

Runaway Mine Train (originally called Run-A-Way Mine Train) is a steel mine train roller coaster located in the Boomtown section of Six Flags Over Texas in Arlington, Texas. Built in 1966, Runaway Mine Train is the oldest roller coaster in the park.

== History ==
Runaway Mine Train opened on July 23, 1966. The ride was the first of many mine train roller coasters built across the United States in response to the development of tubular steel rails. The Arrow Development Company, with Ronald Toomer, Karl Bacon, and Ed Morgan, advanced the steel roller coaster and roller coaster technology into a new era.

In September 2006, Runaway Mine Train was designated an ACE Coaster Landmark by the American Coaster Enthusiasts.

== Ride ==
The ride features three lift hills. The ride begins with the trip up the first and highest lift. From there it travels around the track to the second lift. The second lift is housed in a building designed to look like a rock crusher. The final lift leads into the "Ace Hotel and Saloon". The "Ace Hotel" was named in 1974 for John 'Ace' Cocharo, a mine train foreman turned ride supervisor. After the lift, the ride drops riders into a tunnel through Caddo Lake, emerging just outside the final brake run and queue house.

Runaway is prone to flooding from Johnson Creek after heavy rainfall amounts.

In 2016, The Ace Hotel was shown to be throwing a birthday party with the inclusion of streamers and birthday cake in celebration of 50 years of the ride's operation.

== Design ==
Runaway Mine Train uses tubular steel rails similar to those used on the earlier Matterhorn Bobsleds at Disneyland. This particular coaster has three lift hills and two tunnels. The ride's climax is the final drop after the third lift hill, where the track dives into a 150-foot-long (46 m) curving tunnel below the park's Caddo Lake. This is the world's first underwater coaster tunnel. The old-style Arrow Development cars were designed with restraints (lap bars) that can be released only manually.
