= El Aserradero =

Amusement park ride

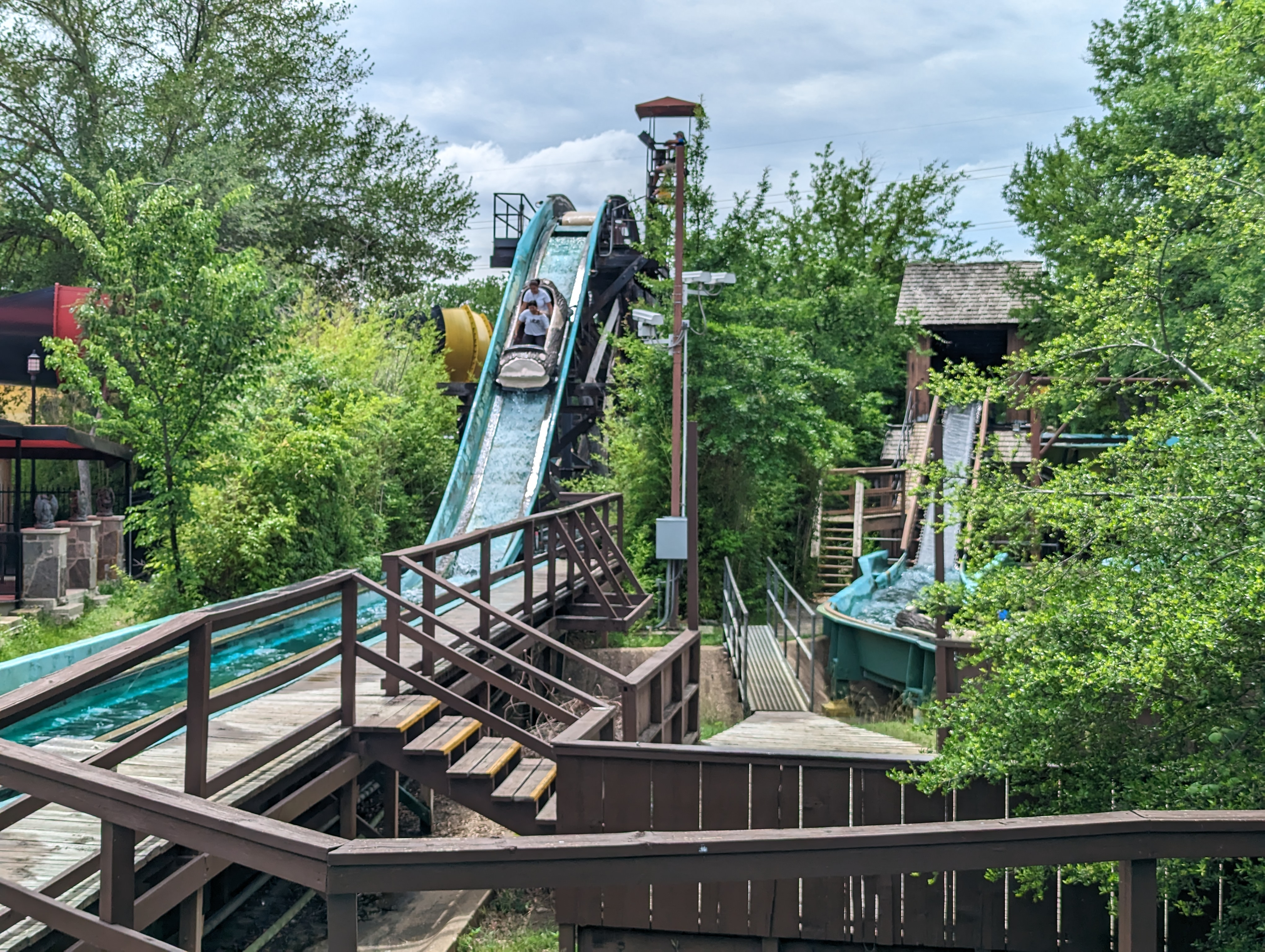

Six Flags Over Texas
- Area: Spain
- Status: Operating
- Opening date: 1963

General statistics
- Type: Log flume
- Manufacturer: Arrow Development
- Lift system: 2 conveyor lift hills
- Capacity: 1000 riders per hour
- Boats: Several boats. Riders are arranged 1 across in 4 rows for a total of 4 riders per boat.
- Restraint style: None
- Fast Lane available

El Aserradero (meaning The Sawmill) is a log flume located at Six Flags Over Texas in Arlington, Texas.

== History ==
El Aserradero was the first ever log flume attraction in the world and the fourth oldest ride currently operating at the park, built by Arrow Development, which later became Arrow Dynamics. The log flume replaced the 'Burro Ride', which operated from 1961 to 1962. From 1963 to 1968, El Aserradero only operated one flume. In 1968, due to the ride's popularity, Six Flags added a second flume next to the original, doubling the attraction’s capacity. The park billed the ride as "the most popular and exciting ride ever devised."

During the 1970s, Six Flags Over Texas added themed animations along the ride in which Lumberjacks could be seen sawing logs. Also added was a cover to the drop on flume 2, which later was removed along with the animations.

El Aserradero's success inspired many amusement parks around the world to add a log flume of some type.

On August 30, 2023, the park announced that the two flumes of El Aserradero would be combined into one, making it one of the longest log flume type attraction in the world. It was also announced that the ride would undergo a new name as El Rio Lento. Quietly, Six Flags Over Texas had removed the announcement and all of any details of the El Rio Lento on their website and at the park, creating rumors of the ride being canceled. The park has not released a statement since the announcement on August 30.

== Ride Experience ==
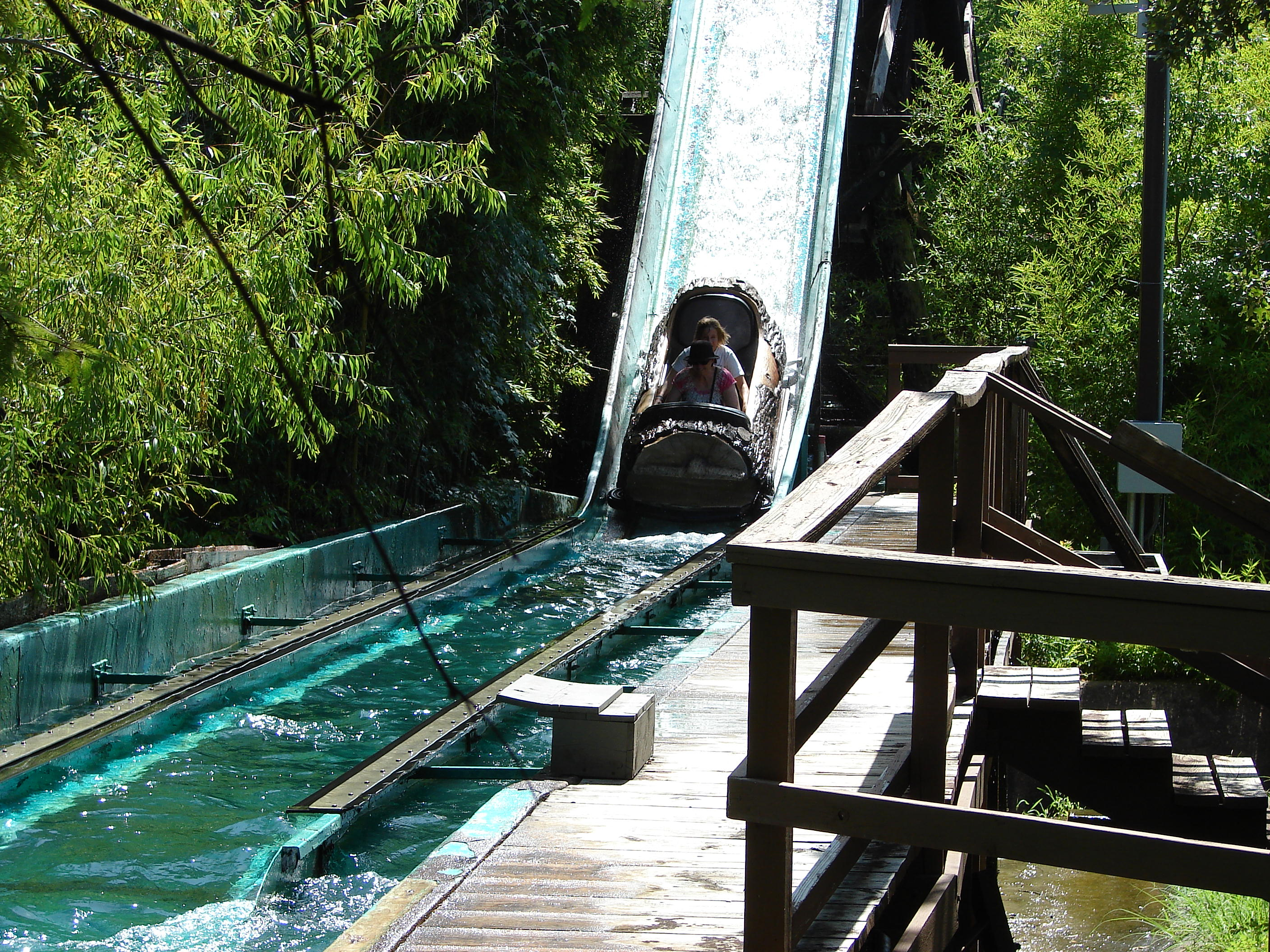
One of the splash drops in El Aserradero

El Aserradero's entrance is located in the Texas theme section of the park, but the ride is in the Spain section along with the exit. Once guests load into one of the fiberglass logs, the log then travels to the first lift hill. The log is carried up the lift hill on a conveyor belt, then drops down a slide into the flume, which is the highest part of the ride. The log then floats around the curving flume, carried forward by the water and traveling slightly downhill. The log then reaches a second lift hill, then drops down a much longer slide and splashes down at the end of the ride.

El Aserradero operates from spring to the end of Fright Fest in October.

== See also ==
- Log Flume

== Primary sources ==
- Park Times, El Aserradero full of information of El Aserradero
