= Tormenta Rampaging Run =

Roller coaster in Texas, US

- CGI rendering of the ride's layout

Six Flags Over Texas
- Location: Six Flags Over Texas
- Park section: Spain
- Coordinates: 32.7551°N 97.0723°W
- Status: Operating
- Opening date: July 9, 2026
- Replaced: La Vibora, El Diablo and Conquistador

General statistics
- Type: Steel
- Manufacturer: Bolliger & Mabillard
- Model: Dive Coaster
- Lift/launch system: Chain lift hill
- Height: 309 ft (94 m)
- Drop: 285 ft (87 m)
- Length: 4,199 ft (1,280 m)
- Speed: 87 mph (140 km/h)
- Inversions: 4
- Max vertical angle: 95°
- Height restriction: 48–76 in (122–193 cm)
- Theme: Running of the bulls
- Website: Official website
- Fast Lane available
- Tormenta Rampaging Run at RCDB

Tormenta Rampaging Run is a steel roller coaster at Six Flags Over Texas in Arlington, Texas, United States. The Dive Coaster model from Bolliger & Mabillard (B&M) opened on July 9, 2026, as the tallest, fastest, and longest dive coaster in the world. With a height of 309 feet (94 m), the ride is a giga coaster and is the second-tallest B&M coaster behind Fury 325 at Carowinds.

== History ==
Following the merger of Six Flags and rival Cedar Fair in July 2024, a new roller coaster was announced later that year in November as a "record breaking dive coaster", and the park's La Vibora and El Diablo rides were subsequently closed. La Vibora was an Intamin-built bobsled roller coaster that opened in 1986 and was frequently plagued by mechanical issues by the end of its operation. Demolition of the ride began in December 2024, which also included El Diablo in April 2025.

Due to the proximity to Dallas Fort Worth International Airport, the park filed numerous height clearances with the Federal Aviation Administration in February 2025, revealing a peak structural height of 309 feet (94 m). The name of the new coaster, Tormenta Rampaging Run, and its specifications were officially unveiled in September 2025. Two of the coaster's trains were featured in joint ceremonies on November 18, 2025, with one held at the park and the other at the IAAPA Expo in Orlando, Florida.

The final piece of track was lifted into place on March 12, 2026.

The ride was scheduled to open on June 26, 2026, but the park released a statement on June 22 that the opening would be delayed because the "commissioning and testing process is taking longer than expected." A new opening date was not included in this announcement.

The ride opened for technical rehearsals for season pass and membership holders only on July 3, 2026. The park held a media day on July 8, 2026, and the grand opening was July 9, 2026.

== Ride experience ==
The ride begins by leaving the station, turning 180 degrees to the left, then ascending the 309-foot (94 m) chain lift hill. During the climb, riders can hear pre-recorded chants of "Tormenta" played through speakers. At the peak, the track turns 90 degrees to the left, perches the train over the edge for about five seconds, then drops them into the 95 degree drop. The train traverses the 218-foot (66 m) tall Immelmann loop, the tallest in the world, exiting to the left and into a 179-foot (55 m) tall vertical loop, also the tallest of its kind. Following this, the train travels through a unique Immelmann twisting element before entering the mid-course brake run. After another drop, the course follows a shorter Immelmann loop into a cutback leading into the final brake run.

== Theme controversy ==
Officials from the animal rights activist group PETA criticized Six Flags for its choice of theming around the running of the bulls. Six Flags responded that the theming is meant to serve as a fictional backstory. Public relations manager Wilma Rivera stated, "The bull is the hero of our story, and the ride honors his strength and speed."

== Records ==
Tormenta Rampaging Run opened as the first "giga dive coaster" with a height of 309 feet (94 m), making it the tallest dive coaster ever built. With a top speed of 87 mph (140 km/h) and a track length of 4,199 feet (1,280 m), the coaster also became the fastest and longest Dive Coaster model, surpassing 2019's Yukon Striker at Canada's Wonderland. Among B&M roller coasters, it ranks second in height, and its 285-foot drop (87 m) is the longest beyond-vertical drop on a roller coaster.

The ride's first inversion, a 218-foot (66 m) tall Immelmann loop, is the tallest of its kind in the world and one of the tallest inversions overall. Its 179-foot (55 m) tall vertical loop is also record-breaking, surpassing Flash at Lewa Adventure.
