= Judge Roy Scream =

Roller coaster at Six Flags Over Texas

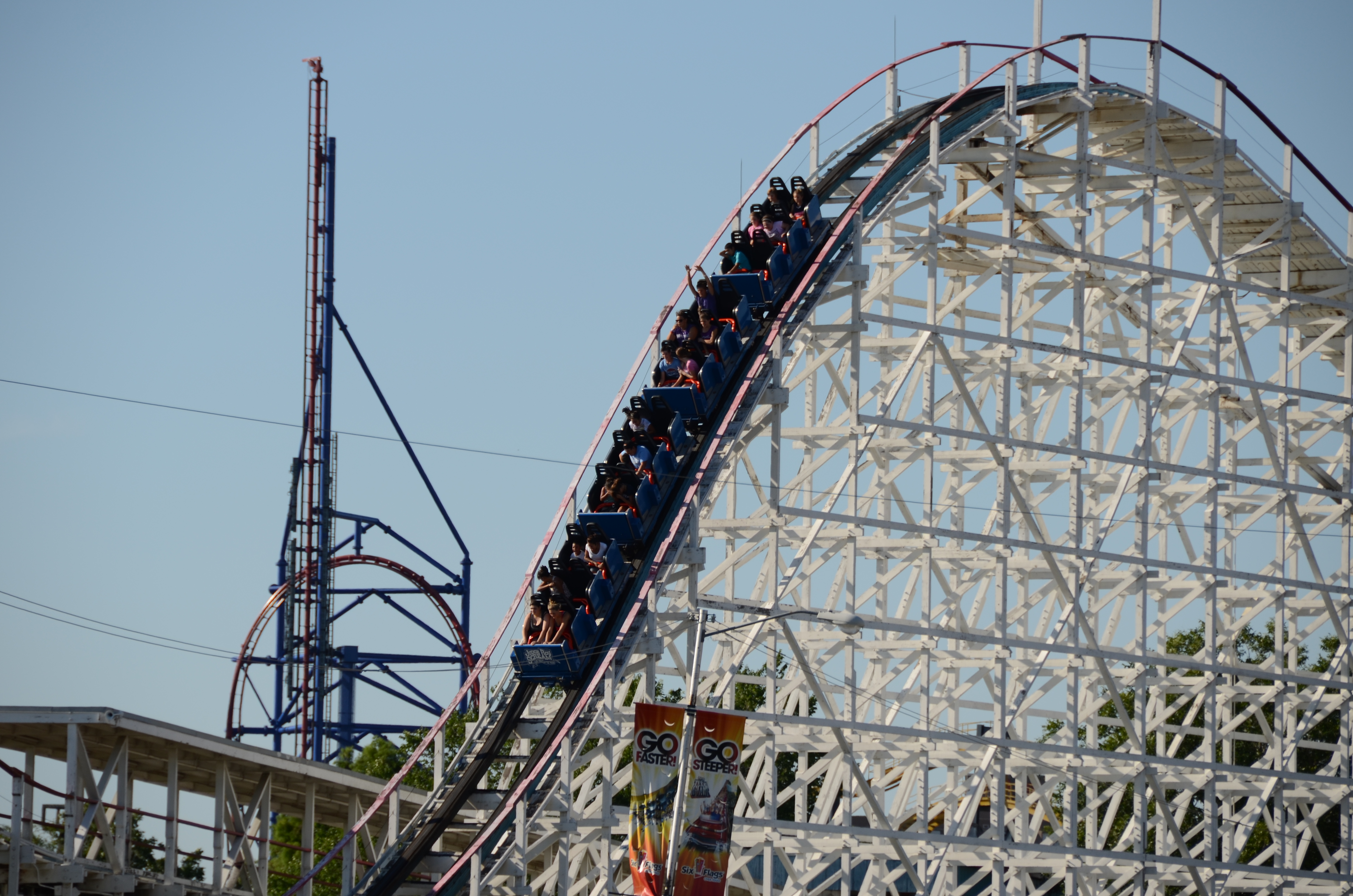

Six Flags Over Texas
- Location: Six Flags Over Texas
- Park section: Goodtimes Square
- Coordinates: 32.755407°N 97.067299°W
- Status: Operating
- Opening date: March 1, 1980
- Cost: $2,100,000

General statistics
- Type: Wood
- Manufacturer: William Cobb & Associates
- Designer: Don Rosser and Bill Cobb
- Model: custom
- Track layout: Wooden out-and-back
- Lift/launch system: Chain lift hill
- Height: 71 ft (22 m)
- Drop: 65 ft (20 m)
- Length: 2,670 ft (810 m)
- Speed: 45 mph (72 km/h)
- Inversions: 0
- Duration: 1:30
- Max vertical angle: 42°
- Capacity: 1200 riders per hour
- G-force: 4.0
- Height restriction: 48 in (122 cm)
- Judge Roy Scream at RCDB

Judge Roy Scream is a wooden roller coaster located at Six Flags Over Texas in Arlington, Texas. It features a custom out and back layout designed to appeal to families as a starter/intermediate coaster.

Judge Roy Scream was introduced in 1980 as the park's first wooden roller coaster. Judge Roy Scream sits adjacent to the park's entry lake. Guests visiting Six Flags Over Texas must use a tunnel in the Goodtimes Square section to travel under the park's parking lot entrance road to get to the attraction. The name Judge Roy Scream refers to Judge Roy Bean, as implied by a sign in the line describing the 19th-century justice of the peace.

== History ==
On November 30, 1979, it was announced that Judge Roy Scream would be coming to Six Flags Over Texas. The ride opened on March 1, 1980 at a cost of $2.1 million. It was built by Marvin M. Black Co.

During the 1994 season, the park ran Judge Roy Scream with its trains facing backwards. Originally planned to occur for 10 weeks, it was retained for the remainder of the season following high demand.

In 2002, Chris Sawyer's RollerCoaster Tycoon 2 included the roller coaster as part of a larger Six Flags roller coaster tie-in.

In 2006, Six Flags over Texas hosted a 45-hour marathon ride on the Judge Roy Scream. There were a total of 19 contestants; ten from the American Coaster Enthusiasts and nine radio contestants.
