= Silver Star Carousel =

Carousel at Six Flags Over Texas

Coordinates: 32°45′22″N 97°4′15″W

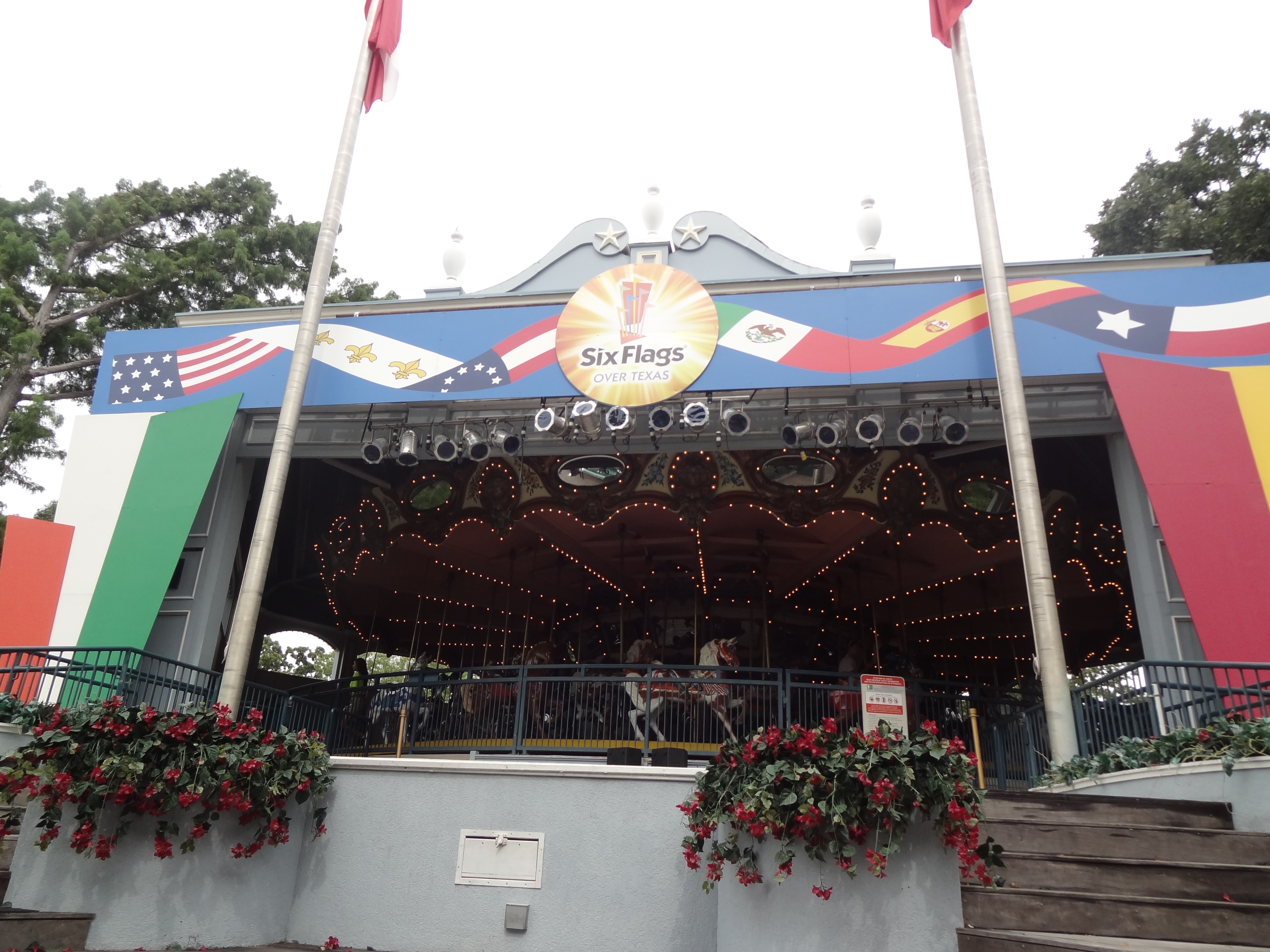

Six Flags Over Texas
- Area: Star Mall
- Status: Operating
- Opening date: April 20, 1963; 61 years ago

Ride statistics
- Manufacturer: Dentzel Carousel Company
- Designer: William Dentzel
- Speed: 3 mph (4.8 km/h)
- Duration: 3:00
- Height restriction: 42 in (107 cm)

The Silver Star Carousel is a carousel located in the Star Mall area at Six Flags Over Texas. It opened at the park on April 20, 1963.

The Silver Star Carousel features 50 jumping horses, 16 standing horses, and two chariots featuring dragon carvings. The horses and chariots are all wooden and hand carved.

Because of the ride’s historical background, the Texas Historical Commission declared the ride an official historical site in 1966.

== History ==
=== Rockaway's Playland Amusement Park (1928-1962) ===
The Silver Star Carousel was the last carousel built by William Dentzel of the Dentzel Carousel Company in Philadelphia. It was originally erected near the municipal boardwalk at Rockaways' Playland Amusement Park on Long Island, New York in 1928. When it was first built, Dentzel owned the ride, while a friend of his operated it as a concession.

When Dentzel died in March 1928, Rockaways' Playland purchased the carousel from his estate, and operated it until 1937. In that year the carousel was put into storage until 1945. It was then put back into operation at Rockaway’s.

=== Six Flags Over Texas (1962-present) ===
In late 1962, The Great Southwest Corporation (now Six Flags) bought the Silver Star Carousel from Rockaway's Playland for $25,000.

When asked about the Silver Star Carousel's new home, spokesmen from Six Flags Over Texas said that the intrinsic value of it "could not be estimated" due to the fact it was one of the few remaining hand-crafted carousels in the country.

==== 1988 renovation ====
On March 5, 1988, the Boomtown Carousel reopened after a three-year renovation period. At that time, the name was changed back to "Silver Star Carousel" and the ride was moved from its location in Boomtown to the Star Mall area near the park's front gates.

== See also ==
- Grand Ole Carousel
- Columbia Carousel
