= High-altitude research =

There are a wide range of potential applications for research at high altitude, including medical, physiological, and cosmic physics research.

== High-altitude medical research ==
The most obvious and direct application of high-altitude research is to understand altitude illnesses such as acute mountain sickness, and the rare but rapidly fatal conditions, high-altitude pulmonary edema (HAPE) and high-altitude cerebral edema (HACE). Research at high altitude is also an important way to learn about sea level conditions that are caused or complicated by hypoxia such as chronic lung disease and sepsis. Patients with these conditions are very complex and usually suffer from several other diseases at the same time, so it is virtually impossible to work out which of their problems is caused by lack of oxygen. Altitude research gets round this by studying the effects of oxygen deprivation on otherwise healthy people.

Travelling to high altitude is often used as a way of studying the way the body responds to a shortage of oxygen. It is difficult and prohibitively expensive to conduct some of this research at sea level.

Although the shortage of air contributes to the effects on the human body, research has found that most altitude sicknesses can be linked to the lack of atmospheric pressure. At low elevation, the pressure is higher because the molecules of air are compressed from the weight of the air above them. However, at higher elevations, the pressure is lower and the molecules are more dispersed. The percentage of oxygen in the air at sea level is the same at high altitudes. But because the air molecules are more spread out at higher altitudes, each breath takes in less oxygen to the body. With this in mind, the lungs take in as much air as possible, but because the atmospheric pressure is lower the molecules are more dispersed, resulting in a lower amount of oxygen per breath.

At 26,000 feet the body reaches a maximum and can no longer adjust to the altitude, often referred to as the "Death Zone".
