= Teacups =

Type of amusement park ride

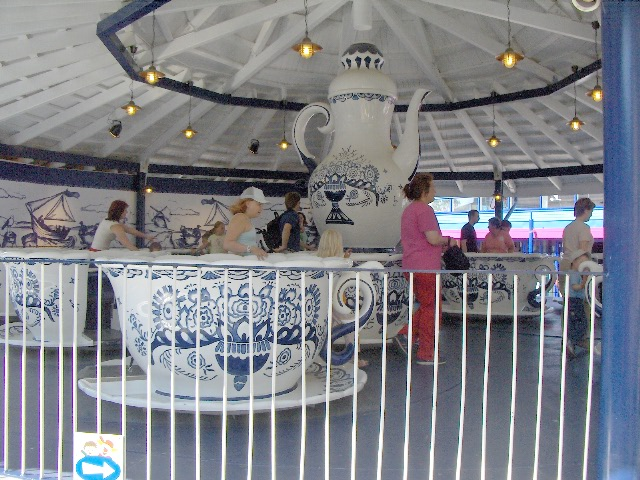
A teacups ride in operation at Linnanmäki park

Teacups, or spinning teacups, is a type of amusement ride characterized by teacup-shaped spinning vehicles atop a turntable-like floor, which may also spin.

== Design ==
Typically, each set of six teacups has a center bearing mounted underneath, similar to a car wheel bearing mounted on a circular floor capable of turning 360°. The circular floor of the cup sits on a larger turntable-like floor. This is driven by a motor through a starting device; the ride when started spins slowly and then speeds up as the operator applies more power. When in operation, the ride operator spins each cup while the turntable spins the entire ride base. They are driven by a motor fixed to the base in either the middle or the outside. The motor fixed in the middle has a gearbox which changes direction, as well as the correct ratio for the desired speed. The motor fixed on the outside again has a gearbox but is attached to a small rubber wheel which sits along the rim under the platform.

== History ==
Among the earliest and best-known versions of teacups ride is Disney's Mad Tea Party, which was introduced when Disneyland was opened in 1955. The ride was developed by Karl Bacon and Ed Morgan of ride-design company Arrow Development. Versions of this ride would also be installed in Disney's Florida, Paris, Tokyo, and Hong Kong parks, and many unaffiliated manufacturers and amusement parks would install their own versions.

== See also ==
- Ptolemy's epicycle model of the Solar System has been likened by physicists to the spinning-teacups ride.
- Marauder's Mayhem - a similar kind of ride at Alton Towers in Staffordshire, England
