= Aquaman: Power Wave =

Roller coaster at Six Flags Over Texas

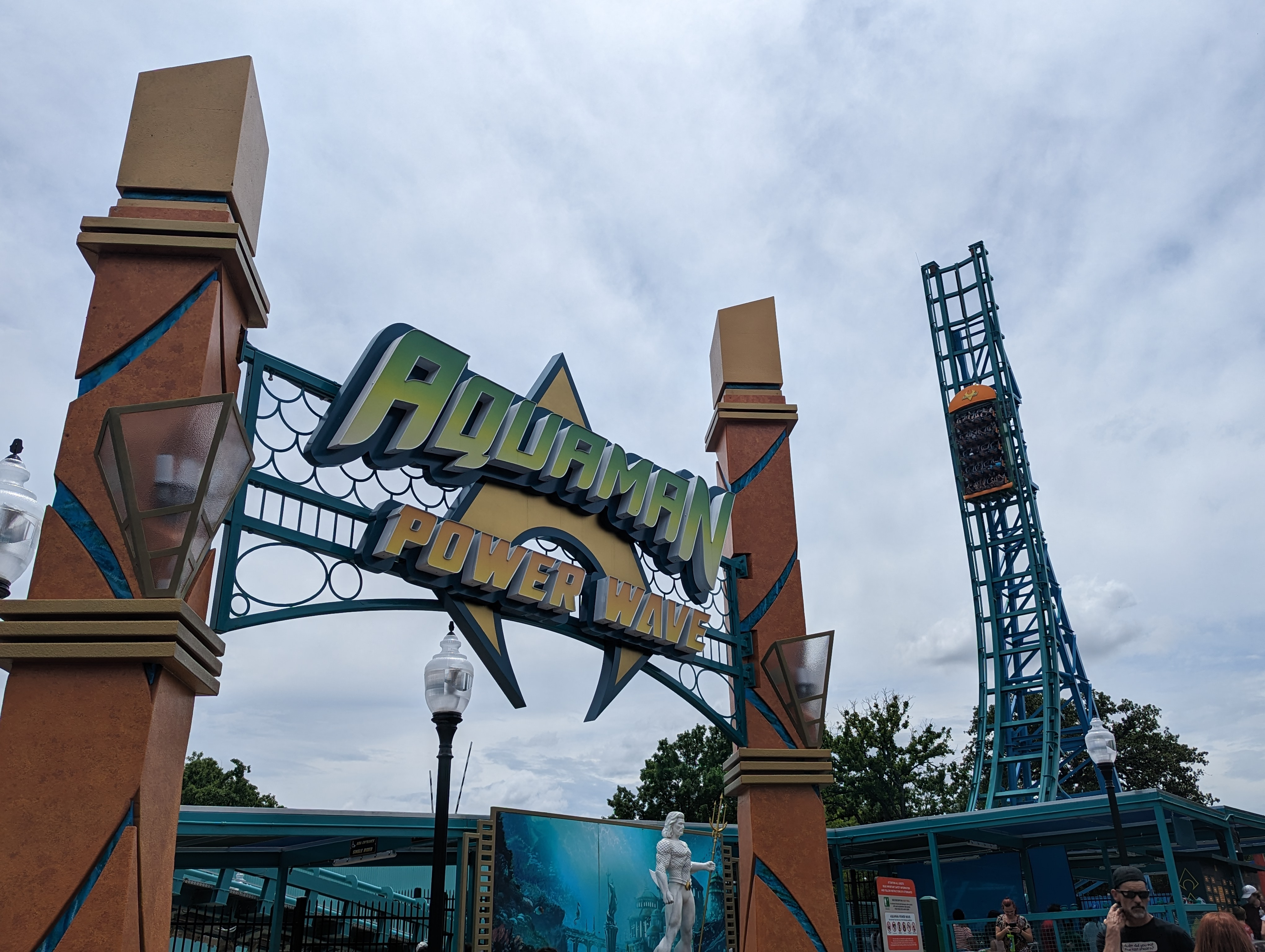

Six Flags Over Texas
- Location: Six Flags Over Texas
- Park section: USA
- Coordinates: 32.756°N 97.071°W
- Status: Operating
- Soft opening date: February 25, 2023
- Opening date: March 11, 2023
- Replaced: Aquaman Splashdown

General statistics
- Type: Steel – Shuttle – Launched
- Manufacturer: Mack Rides
- Lift/launch system: LSM launch
- Height: 146.3 ft (44.6 m)
- Length: 708.7 ft (216.0 m)
- Speed: 62.1 mph (99.9 km/h)
- Max vertical angle: 90°
- Capacity: 731 riders per hour
- Height restriction: 48 in (122 cm)
- Trains: 2 trains with a single car. Riders are arranged 4 across in 5 rows for a total of 20 riders per train.
- Fast Lane available
- Aquaman: Power Wave at RCDB

Aquaman: Power Wave is a steel launched shuttle roller coaster at Six Flags Over Texas in Arlington, Texas themed to the DC Comics character Aquaman.

== History ==
On August 29, 2019, Six Flags Over Texas announced Aquaman: Power Wave for the 2020 season of the park. The roller coaster replaced the former Aquaman Splashdown attraction near the park entrance. Aquaman: Power Wave is considered one of the top 10 new roller coasters anticipated for the 2020 season according to USA Today. Construction of the new roller coaster started and finished in February 2020.

Due to the growing concerns of the COVID-19 pandemic, Six Flags announced a suspension of operations across the company on March 13, 2020. This included all operations at Six Flags Over Texas, including the prep work for the new coaster. The park resumed operations on June 19, 2020, with Aquaman: Power Wave still fenced in for construction. Earlier in April 2020, Six Flags announced measures for the company to survive the coronavirus pandemic, including deferring capital projects across the company that was slated for the 2020 season. In December 2020, Six Flags Over Texas responded to a user on Twitter questioning the status of Aquaman: Power Wave. The park stated that the coaster would now open in 2022.

On the 60th anniversary of the park (August 5, 2021), Six Flags Over Texas announced that Aquaman: Power Wave was going to be modified with a turntable station to accommodate two 20-passenger boats. Originally, when the roller coaster was announced, the ride was to feature just one boat and no turntable station.

The park announced on all of its social media accounts a third delay to the roller coaster, setting the new ride to open for the 2023 season. Citing the effects of supply chain issues and labor shortages, help caused for the delay.

Six Flags Over Texas announced on February 15, 2023, that the roller coaster would open the following month on March 11. The park soft opened Aquaman: Power Wave two weeks before the set opening day of the roller coaster for season pass holders.

Not long after opening, the ride received new two-way lockers, in which a door swings open on one side to insert belongings, and then swings open on the other side as guests exit the ride to retrieve them.

== Ride experience ==
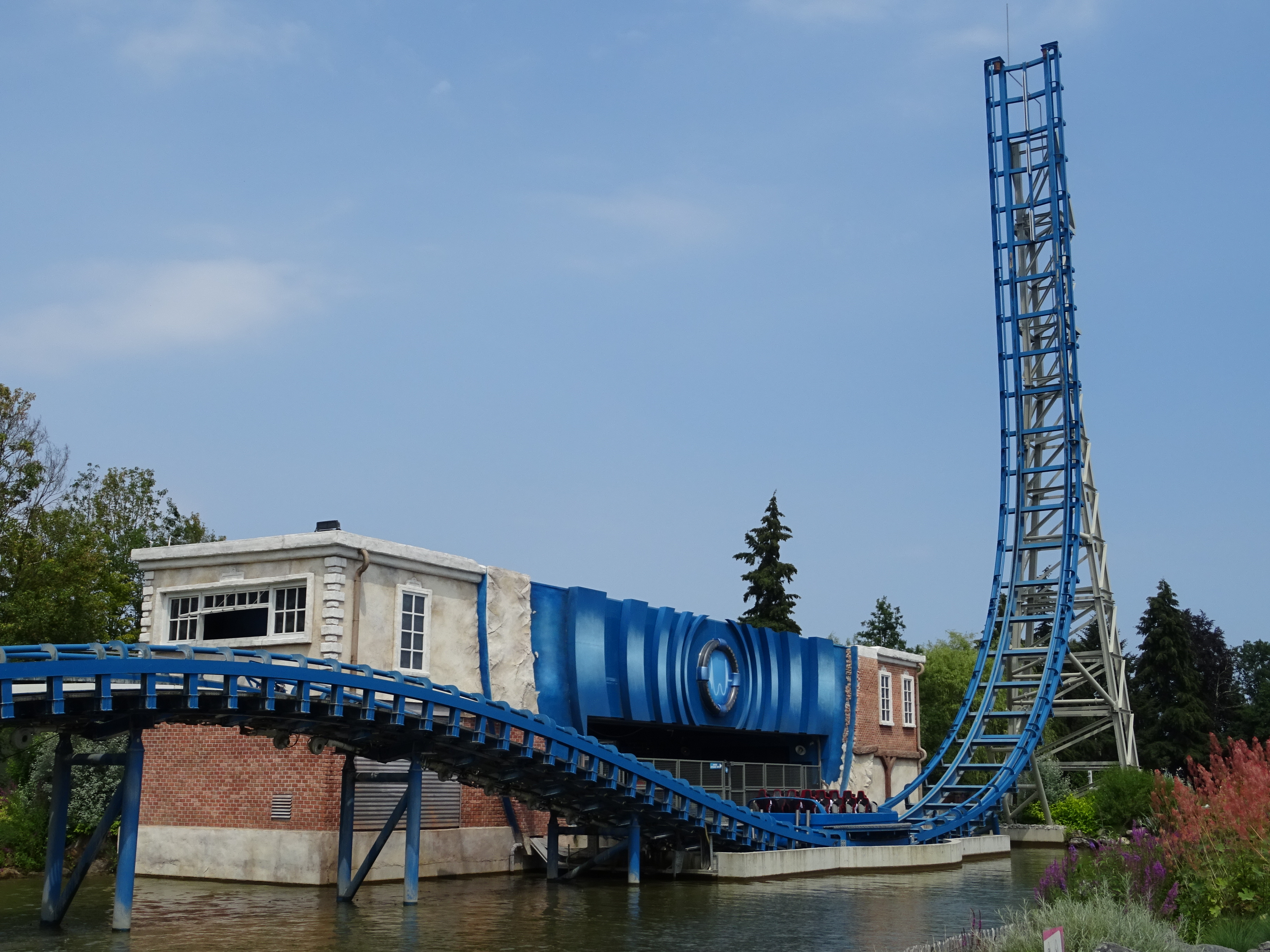
Aquaman: Power Wave is similar to the Pulsar roller coaster at Walibi Belgium.

Aquaman: Power Wave is 146.3 feet (44.6 m) in height, reaches a maximum speed of 62.1 miles per hour (99.9 km/h), and has a track length of 708.7 feet (216.0 m). The ride features two vehicles, each seating 20 riders in 5 rows of 4 riders each. The ride can accommodate a maximum of 950 riders per hour when using two vehicles.

After riders are loaded, the turntable rotates, and the vehicle lines up with the track. Once the track is locked in place, the vehicle accelerates backward over a small hill before traveling through a straight section of track. This straight section of track goes through the ride's splashdown pool. The water in the pool is low enough at this point in the ride that the vehicle can travel over it. The car continues part of the way up a vertical spike before losing momentum and reversing direction. It then travels forward over the pool and launches with a much faster forward acceleration into a second vertical spike, and then comes back down the spike before entering a second backward launch. While the car is on the vertical spike at the back end of the ride's layout, water flows from the side reservoirs into the splashdown pool, raising the level in about six seconds. The car then travels down the spike and enters the splashdown pool which is now high enough to interact with the boat, soaking all riders. This also serves to slow the car down before the end of the ride to unload riders.
