= Six Flags Over Texas =

Amusement park in Texas

- Logo used since 2025

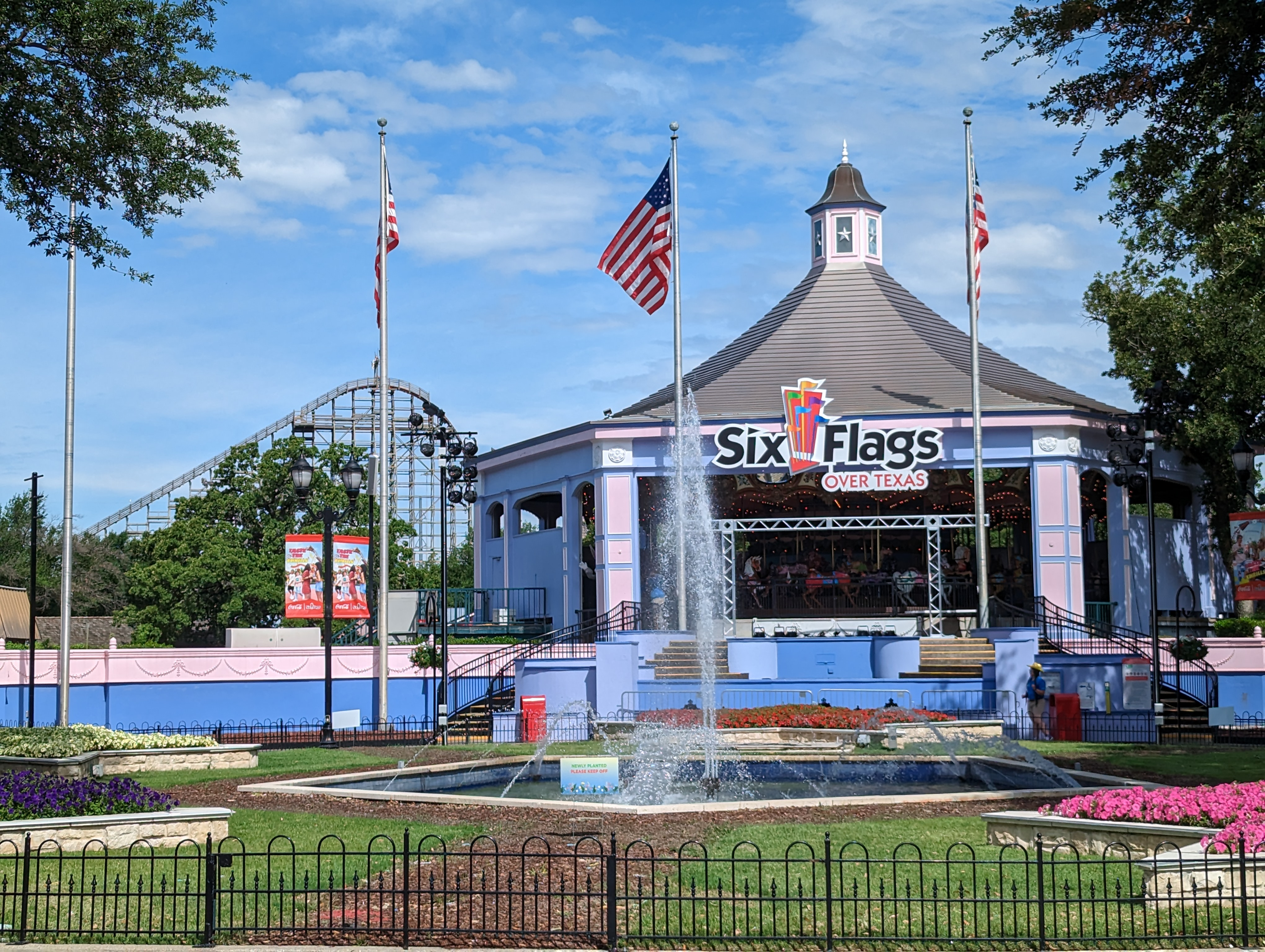
- Silver Star Carousel, located at the park's entrance plaza. New Texas Giant can be seen in the background.
- Interactive map of Six Flags Over Texas
- Location: Arlington, Texas, U.S.
- Coordinates: 32°45′20.52″N 97°4′12.80″W
- Status: Operating
- Opened: August 5, 1961; 65 years ago
- Owner: Texas Flags, Ltd. (54%)
- Park president: Pete Carmichael
- Operated by: Six Flags
- Slogan: The Thrill Capital of Texas
- Operating season: Year-round
- Area: 212 acres (0.331 mi^{2}) (0.86 km^{2})

Attractions
- Total: 45
- Roller coasters: 13
- Water rides: 3
- Website: sixflags.com/overtexas

Six Flags Over Texas is a 212-acre (86 ha) amusement park, in Arlington, Texas, United States, east of Fort Worth and west of Dallas. It is the first amusement park in the Six Flags chain, and features themed areas and attractions. The park opened on August 5, 1961, after a year of construction and an initial investment of US$10 million by real estate developer Angus G. Wynne Jr.

The park is managed by the Six Flags Entertainment Corp., which owns a 54% interest of the Texas Limited Partnership that owns the park. Six Flags Over Texas Fund, Ltd., a private-equity and asset-management firm, headed by Dallas businessman Jack Knox, bought the park in 1969. Over the years, the various companies that managed the park exercised options to purchase interest in the fund. Six Flags Entertainment has an option to purchase the remaining 46% in 2028. In 1991, Time Warner Entertainment began managing park operations. In 1998, Time Warner sold its interests in the Six Flags parks to Premier Parks, of Oklahoma City, which later changed its name to Six Flags Theme Parks, Inc.

== History ==
The original logo for Six Flags Over Texas

After a visit to Disneyland in Anaheim, California, shortly after its opening, a wealthy real estate developer, Angus G. Wynne Jr., concluded that his home state, Texas, should have a similar park. Planning for such a place began in 1959, under the leadership of Wynne and the Great Southwest Corporation, along with the backing of various New York City investors. Construction of the park began in August 1960.

The name "Six Flags Over Texas" refers to the flags of the six nations that have governed Texas: Spain, France, Mexico, the Republic of Texas, the United States of America, and the Confederate States of America. Wynne originally intended to name the park "Texas Under Six Flags". Various legends have attributed the name change to his wife, Joann; to the Daughters of the Republic of Texas, of which his wife may have been a member; and to his entertainment director, Charles Meeker, who is said to have stated "Texas isn't 'under' anything." The original park was divided into six themed areas for each of the six entities that had ruled Texas. Other themed areas have since been added.

Six Flags Over Texas opened its gates from July 29 to August 4, 1961, to several local corporations that Wynne had invited as part of a "soft-test opening". The park held its grand-opening ceremonies on Saturday, August 5, 1961. Dignitaries included the mayors of Arlington, Dallas, Fort Worth, Grand Prairie, and Irving. Park attendance reached 8,374. Admission cost $2.75 (equivalent to $30 in 2025) for adults and $2.25 (equivalent to $24 in 2025) for children; parking cost 50 cents (equivalent to $5 in 2025); hamburgers, 35 cents (equivalent to $4 in 2025); soft drinks, 10 cents (equivalent to $1 in 2025). On opening day, guests could visit the six original themed sections: Mexico, Spain, France, The Confederacy, Texas, and Modern (representing the United States). According to the 1961 Park Map there were 46 "major attractions". The park's first season, lasting 45 days and ending on November 25, 1961, was a success, with over 550,000 visitors.

During its first decade, the park added two sections: Boomtown, named after the boomtowns that sprang up quickly during Texas' oil boom era and the "Tower Section", named after the Oil Derrick observation tower built in 1969. The park also added two attractions: El Aserradero in 1963 and the Runaway Mine Train roller coaster in 1966. Attendance reached close to 2 million visitors a year by the end of the decade.

In 1974, Six Flags Over Texas announced attendance had reached 2,184,000.

For the 50th anniversary (2011), Six Flags Over Texas introduced the first I-Box roller coaster track with a transformation of Texas Giant. The reception from the conversion led the manufacturer to bring the new technology all over the world.

During this time, Six Flags (the company) began to remove licensed theming from its theme parks, including from attractions that the park had built in previous years. For example, Six Flags Over Texas had to rename Tony Hawk's Big Spin to Pandemonium.

In 2020, park management decided to expand from a March-December operating season to year-round operations. But on March 13, 2020, Six Flags suspended operations on its properties for the COVID-19 pandemic in Texas. During the closure, the park donated food and supplies to local charities. The park reopened to members and season pass holders on June 19 and to the general public on June 22.

The park stopped accepting cash in 2025. To assist with the transition, kiosks were added for attendees to convert cash into prepaid debit cards for park purchases.

=== Confederate themes ===
For more than three decades, one of the original themed areas was The Confederacy, which showcased Civil War re-enactments and displayed the Confederate States of America flag.

In the 1990s, it was rethemed as "Old South" and all Confederate battle flags were removed. The shift drew little attention as there were no high-profile rides in that area. However, the Confederate States of America flag remained one of the six flags that was flown at the park entrance.

In August 2017, in response to the controversial Unite the Right rally that was held in Charlottesville, Virginia, the park replaced its six flags (which had included the first Confederate flag, a Republic of Texas flag, a 19th-century Spanish flag, an 18th-century French flag, a 19th-century United States flag, and a 19th-century Mexican flag) with six American flags. A representative of the park told KXAS-TV, "We always choose to focus on celebrating the things that unite us versus those that divide us. As such, we have changed the flag displays in our park to feature American flags."

== Attractions ==
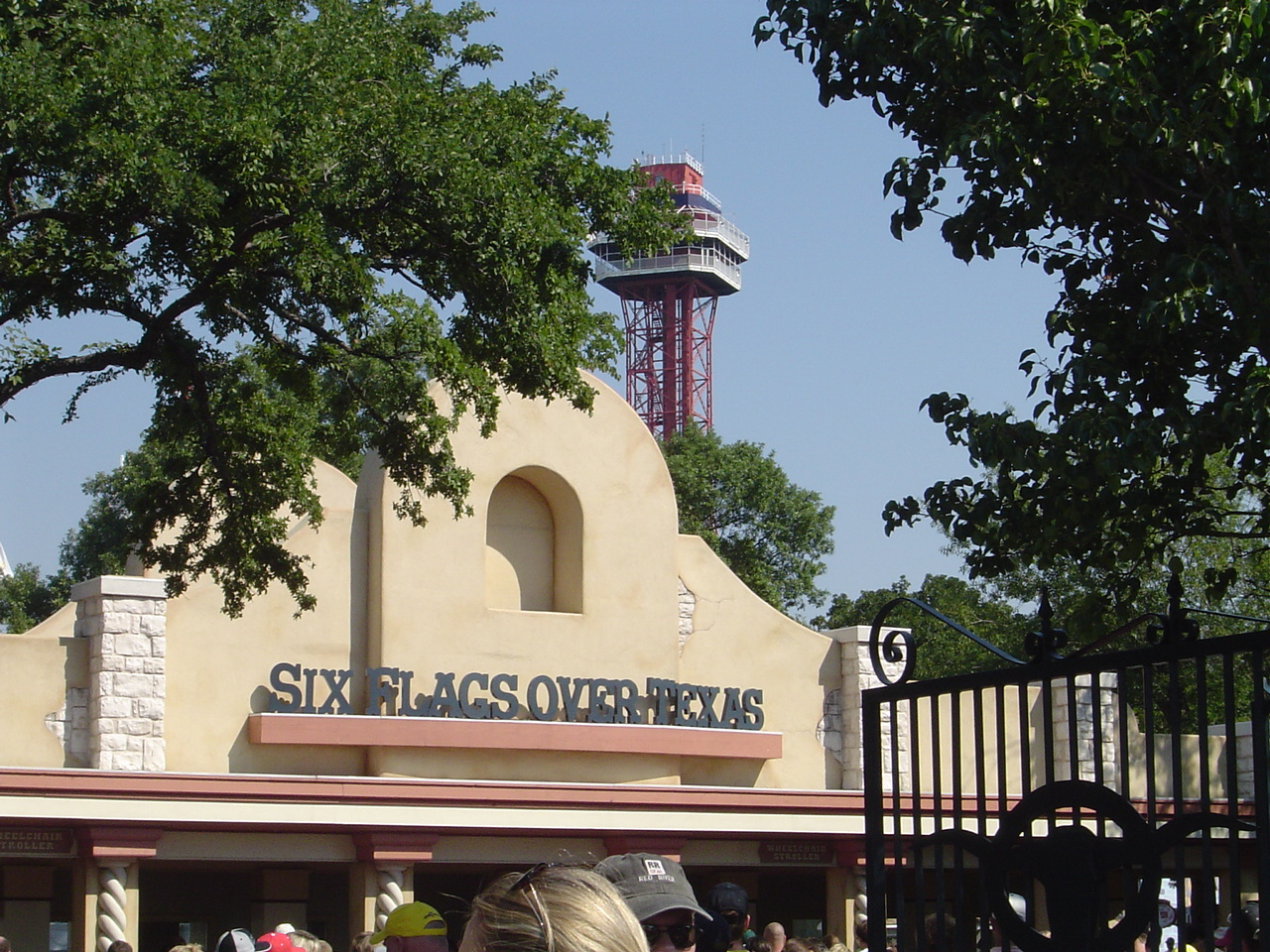
The entrance of Six Flags over Texas welcomes visitors while the Oil Derrick observation tower looms in the background.

=== Roller coasters ===
Name	Opened	Track	Type	Park section	Height	Speed	Refs
Aquaman: Power Wave	2023	Steel	Power Splash	USA	146.3 feet (44.6 m)	62.1 mph (99.9 km/h)	
Batman: The Ride	1999	Steel	Inverted roller coaster	Gotham City	105 feet (32 m)	50 mph (80 km/h)	
Judge Roy Scream	1980	Wood	Sit down	Gotham City	71 feet (22 m)	45 mph (72 km/h)	
Mini Mine Train	1969	Steel	Mine train	Boomtown	20 feet (6.1 m)	20 mph (32 km/h)	
Mr. Freeze	1998	Steel	Launched Shuttle Loop	Gotham City	218 feet (66 m)	70 mph (110 km/h)	
New Texas Giant	2011	Steel	I-Box custom	Texas	153 feet (47 m)	65 mph (105 km/h)	
Pandemonium	2008	Steel	Spinning Coaster	Boomtown	53 feet (16 m)	31 mph (50 km/h)	
Runaway Mine Train	1966	Steel	Mine Train	Boomtown	35 feet (11 m)	35 mph (56 km/h)	
Runaway Mountain	1996	Steel	Sit down	France	65 feet (20 m)	40 mph (64 km/h)	
Shock Wave	1978	Steel	Sit down looper	Tower	116 feet (35 m)	60 mph (97 km/h)	
The Joker	2017	Steel	4th Dimension coaster	Gotham City	120 feet (37 m)	38 mph (61 km/h)	
Titan	2001	Steel	Hypercoaster	Texas	245 feet (75 m)	85 mph (137 km/h)	
Tormenta Rampaging Run	2026	Steel	Dive Coaster	Spain	309 feet (94 m)	87 mph (140 km/h)	
Wile E. Coyote's Grand Canyon Blaster	2001	Steel	Sit down	Boomtown	16.1 feet (4.9 m)	15 mph (24 km/h)	

=== First-of-their-kind and/or world's only features or attractions ===
- First Six Flags Theme Park. This is the original Six Flags Theme Park, opened on August 5, 1961
- First Pay one Price (POP) admission
- First theme park to feature Broadway-style shows (1961)
- First Intamin Ride, the Jet Set
- First Arrow Development Log Flume – El Aserradero (Spanish for The Sawmill) (1963)
- First Arrow Development Mine Train Roller Coaster – The Runaway Mine Train (1966)
- First relaunch of the modern-day parachute ride - Texas Chute Out (1976) Removed in 2012.
- First Freefall Ride - Texas Cliffhanger (later renamed G-Force and then Wildcatter) (1982). Removed in 2007.
- First Premier Rides Roller Coaster - Runaway Mountain (1996)
- First RMC I-Box hybrid coaster - New Texas Giant (2011)
- First Dive Coaster over 300 feet (91 m) tall with Tormenta Rampaging Run

=== Records ===
- Tallest Roller Coaster in Texas - Tormenta Rampaging Run (309 ft)
- Fastest Roller Coaster in Texas - Tormenta Rampaging Run (87 mph)
- Largest Land Based Oil Derrick - Oil Derrick (300 ft)
- 2nd Tallest Swing Ride in the World - Texas Skyscreamer (400 ft)

=== Awards ===
- Texas Giant named World's Best Wooden Roller Coaster in 1998 and 1999 by Amusement Today's Golden Ticket Awards.
- New Texas Giant named Best New Coaster of 2011 by Amusement Today's Golden Ticket Awards.

== Events ==
Six Flags Over Texas hosts events for holidays during the operating season that often draw thousands of visitors to the park. Among them are:

- Fright Fest, an annual Halloween festival. Originally only one night in October called "Fright Night", Fright Fest takes place throughout the month of October and features haunted houses, decorated pathways, patrolling ghouls, and spooky music. Amid the COVID-19 pandemic in 2020, the park renamed the event Hallowfest and held no haunted houses or indoor shows.
- Holiday in the Park – Held annually since 1985 towards the end of November and throughout December, the festival includes festive holiday shows, arts and crafts, and seasonal food. Christmas lights are strung around the park buildings and rides. A snowy hill is available for visitors to sled down.

== See also ==
- Six Flags Hurricane Harbor, a sister water park in Arlington
- Six Flags Fiesta Texas, a Six Flags park in San Antonio, Texas
