= Timeline of Fort Worth, Texas =

The following is a timeline of the history of the city of Fort Worth, Texas, United States.

== Prior to 20th century ==
- 1843 – The Treaty of Bird's Fort between the Republic of Texas and several Indian tribes was signed at Bird's Fort in present-day Haltom City, Texas. Article XI of the treaty provided that no one may "pass the line of trading houses" (at the border of the Indians' territory) without permission of the President of Texas, and may not reside or remain in the Indians' territory. In November, these "trading houses" were established at the junction of the Clear Fork and West Fork of the Trinity River in present-day Fort Worth.
- 1849 – US Army Department of Texas's "Camp Worth" was founded at the junction of the Clear Fork and West Fork as the northernmost of a system of forts for protecting the American Frontier following the end of the Mexican–American War.
- 1855 – Masonic Hall built.
- 1856 – Fort Worth became seat of Tarrant County.
- 1873
  - Fort Worth incorporated.
  - Fort Worth Fire Department established.
- 1874 – Dallas-Fort Worth telegraph began operating.
- 1876 – Texas and Pacific Railway began operating.
- 1882 – Public school established.
- 1883 – First National Bank of Fort Worth established.
- 1888 – Fort Worth Cats baseball team formed.
- 1889
  - Texas Spring Palace ("hall built of grain") opened.
  - New Trinity Cemetery established.
- 1890
  - Fort Worth Union Stockyards began operating.
  - Polytechnic College founded.
- 1895 – Tarrant County Courthouse built.
- 1896 – Fort Worth Fat Stock Show (livestock exhibit) began.
- 1898 – Bohemian literary club formed.

== 20th century ==
- 1901 – Carnegie Public Library opened.
- 1903 – Armour and Swift meatpacking plants began operating.
- 1907
  - Young Women's Christian Association established.
  - Fire Station #1 built.
- 1908 – Cowtown Coliseum built.
- 1909
  - "Fire destroys 20 blocks in Fort Worth."
  - Fort Worth Star-Telegram newspaper in publication.
  - Fort Worth Zoo and Greenwood Memorial Park (cemetery) established.
- 1910
  - Texas Christian University relocated to city.
  - Population: 73,312.
  - City of North Fort Worth annexed
- 1912
  - Oil discovered in vicinity of Fort Worth (at Burkburnett).
  - Southwestern Baptist Theological Seminary opened.
- 1914 – Lake Worth (reservoir) and Allen Chapel AME Church built.
- 1920 – Population: 106,482.
- 1922
  - Niles City became part of Fort Worth.
  - KFJZ and WBAP radio began broadcasting.
- 1926 – Woolworth Building constructed.
- 1927 – KTAT radio began broadcasting.
- 1929 – Blackstone Hotel built.
- 1930
  - Texas & Pacific Railroad Passenger Station and Z Boaz municipal golf course opened.
  - Population: 163,447.
- 1933
  - Fort Worth Botanic Garden established.
  - US Post Office built.
- 1934 – Texas Wesleyan College established.
- 1936 – US mental health hospital/farm opened on outskirts of city.
- 1939 – City Hall built.
- 1940
  - Lake Como Weekly newspaper began publication.
  - Population: 177,662.
- 1942 – US Army Tarrant Field and Consolidated Vultee Aircraft plant began operating.
- 1945 – Fort Worth Children's Museum opened.
- 1946 – Fort Worth Civic Opera Association and All Saints' Episcopal Church congregation established.
- 1948
  - WBAP-TV (television) began broadcasting.
  - Tarrant County Historical Society established.
- 1950
  - Cowtown Drive-In cinema opened.
  - Population: 278,778.
- 1954 – Fort Worth Art Museum opened.
- 1955 – KFJZ-TV (television) began broadcasting.
- 1957 – Dallas-Fort Worth Turnpike and American Airlines Stewardess College opened.
- 1958 – Casa Mañana theatre rebuilt.
- 1960 – Population: 356,268.
- 1961 – Amon Carter Museum of American Art opened.
- 1962
  - Van Cliburn International Piano Competition began.
  - Miss Texas Pageant (beauty contest) relocated to city.
- 1964 – Fort Worth Civil Liberties Union formed.
- 1968 – Fort Worth Museum of Science and History active.
- 1969
  - Alleged Lake Worth Monster spotted.
  - Historic Fort Worth nonprofit established.
- 1970 – Population: 393,476.
- 1972 – Kimbell Art Museum opened.
- 1973
  - Dallas/Fort Worth Airport began operating.
  - Fort Worth Japanese Garden built.
- 1975 – Fort Worth Water Gardens (fountain) built.
- 1977 – Tarrant County Black Historical & Genealogical Society founded.
- 1978
  - Sundance Square redevelopment began.
  - Fairmount Neighborhood Association incorporated.
  - Tandy Foundation established.
- 1980 – Population: 385,164.
- 1981 – Billy Bob's Texas nightclub in business.
- 1982 – Tarrant Area Food Bank founded.
- 1983 – June 14: Hotel fire.
- 1990 – Population: 447,619.
- 1991
  - AMC Sundance cinema in business.
  - Kay Granger became mayor.
- 1992 – Courthouse shooting.
- 1994
  - US Naval Air Station Joint Reserve Base Fort Worth in operation.
  - National Cowgirl Museum and Hall of Fame relocated to city.
- 1997 – Kay Granger became U.S. representative for Texas's 12th congressional district.
- 1998 – City website online (approximate date).
- 1999
  - September 15: Shooting at Wedgwood Baptist Church.
  - Bass Performance Hall opened.
- 2000 – Trinity Railway Express (Dallas-Fort Worth) in operation.

== 21st century ==
- 2001 – Fort Worth Central Station (known as the Fort Worth Intermodal Transportation Center until 2019) and Texas Cowboy Hall of Fame opened.
- 2002 – LaGrave Field (stadium) and Modern Art Museum building opened.
- 2010 – Population: 741,206 city; 6,371,773 metro; 19,728,244 megaregion.
- 2011 – May 14: Fort Worth mayoral election, 2011 held; Betsy Price became mayor.
- 2013 – Fort Worth Vaqueros FC (soccer club) formed.

== See also ==
- History of Fort Worth, Texas
- List of mayors of Fort Worth, Texas
- National Register of Historic Places listings in Tarrant County, Texas
- Timelines of other cities in the North Texas area of Texas: Arlington, Dallas, Denton, Garland, Irving, Plano, Wichita Falls

== Bibliography ==
- History and Directory of Fort Worth ... Colored Businesses, Societies, Clubs, Churches, etc. J.A. Hamilton. 1907.
- Federal Writers' Project (1940), "Fort Worth", Texas: A Guide to the Lone Star State, American Guide Series, New York: Hastings House, hdl:2027/mdp.39015002677667 – via HathiTrust
- Texas Writers' Project (1941), "Chronology (draft)", Research Data: Fort Worth and Tarrant County, Texas, vol. 72 – via Fort Worth Library Digital Archive
- Oliver Knight (1953). Fort Worth: Outpost on the Trinity. University of Oklahoma Press. ISBN 978-0-87565-077-7.
- Robert Harris Talbert (1956). Cowtown Metropolis: Case Study of a City's Growth and Structure. Leo Potishman Foundation, Texas Christian University – via HathiTrust. (fulltext)
- Martin V. Melosi (1983). "Dallas-Fort Worth: marketing and metroplex". In Richard M. Bernard and Bradley R. Rice (ed.). Sunbelt Cities: Politics and Growth since World War II. University of Texas Press. ISBN 978-0-292-76982-3.
- George Thomas Kurian (1994), "Fort Worth, Texas", World Encyclopedia of Cities, vol. 1: North America, Santa Barbara, Calif.: ABC-CLIO, OL 1431653M – via Internet Archive (fulltext)
- Carol E. Roark, ed. (2003). Fort Worth & Tarrant County: An Historical Guide. Fort Worth, TX: Tarrant County Historical Society and TCU Press. ISBN 978-0-87565-279-5.
- David J. Wishart, ed. (2004). "Cities and Towns: Fort Worth, Texas". Encyclopedia of the Great Plains. University of Nebraska Press. ISBN 0-8032-4787-7.
- "Fort Worth, With a Cowboy Past, Has an Artistic Present", New York Times, April 6, 2007
- David Goldfield, ed. (2007). "Fort Worth, Texas". Encyclopedia of American Urban History. Sage. ISBN 978-1-4522-6553-7.
- Harold Rich (2014). Fort Worth: Outpost, Cowtown, Boomtown. University of Oklahoma Press. ISBN 978-0-8061-4718-5.
- David G. McComb (2015). "Railroad Towns: Fort Worth". The City in Texas: a History. University of Texas Press. pp. 126+. ISBN 978-0-292-76746-1.
