= Timeline of Arlington, Texas =

The following is a timeline of the history of the city of Arlington, Texas, USA.

== Prior to 20th century ==
- 1542 – Spanish explorers make camp in an Indian Village named Guasco at current-day Dottie Lynn Pkwy.
- 1838 – Robert Sloan and Nathaniel T. Journey lead an expedition into present-day Euless and Arlington that was recorded as one of the first Anglo-American efforts to open the area to settlement.
- 1841 –
  - General Edward H. Tarrant leads the Battle of Village Creek, killing many Native American people who called Village Creek their home.
  - Captain Jonathan Bird creates Bird's Fort on the north side of present-day Arlington, Anglo-American's first attempt to settle in north Texas.
- 1843 – Treaty of Bird's Fort, a peace treaty between Native Americans and the Republic of Texas opens the door to settlement in the entire region.
- 1848 – "Father of Tarrant County" Colonel Middleton Tate Johnson's Company of Texas Rangers is assigned to Kaufman Station, later known as Johnson Station.
- 1853 – Patrick A. Watson and a group of settlers arrive and settle on land that now borders the present Watson Road.
- 1869 – Reverend Andrew Shannon Hayter arrives and organizes the Good Hope Cumberland Presbyterian Church.
- 1870 – Colonel Middleton Tate Johnson's body is exhumed from Texas State Cemetery and buried in a family cemetery on Arkansas Lane.
- 1871 –
  - United States Congress approved a charter for a transcontinental railroad, including Arlington, Texas.
  - Elder John Quarles Burnett meets with 17 fellow Baptists and organizes the first church in Johnson Station - Johnson Station Baptist Church.
- 1873 – Settlement founded near site of present-day city.
- 1876 –
  - Texas and Pacific Railway established a stop mid-way between Dallas and Fort Worth in present-day Arlington.
  - The town situated around the train stop is named "Hayterville" after Rev. Andrew Shannon Hayter.
  - Carver Dixon "Uncle Dutch" King becomes the first mayor of Arlington.
  - Johnson Station Baptist Church moves with the community three miles north, eventually becoming known as First Baptist Church of Arlington.
- 1877 –
  - Settlement renamed "Arlington" (previously known as "Johnson" or "Hayter") at Rev. Hayter's request.
  - Arlington, Texas is officially recognized by the United States Postal Service.
- 1878 -
  - A group of Methodists meet in Schults' lumberyard at Mesquite and Front Streets and organize the first church congregation in Arlington's original township.
  - Arlington landowner James Daniel Cooper builds a majestic colonial house on the corner of what is now Cooper St. and Abram St.
- 1880 – U.S. Census shows a population of 275 people with eight general merchants, three drug stores, a lumber dealer, two physicians, a hotel keeper, a saloon operator and various other occupations including farming.
- 1881 – M. J. Brinson becomes mayor for the first time.
- 1883 – William Timmerman and Colonel Thomas Spruance establishes the city's first newspaper called "The World."
- 1884 – Arlington officially incorporates as a city.
- 1885 –
  - Edward Emmett Rankin becomes mayor for just a month.
  - First church building in Arlington is built.
- 1887 – Cemetery Society (later Arlington Historical Society) founded.
- 1889 – M. J. Brinson becomes mayor for the second time.
- 1891 – Rice Wood Collins, a successful merchant, starts public well campaign for access to water.

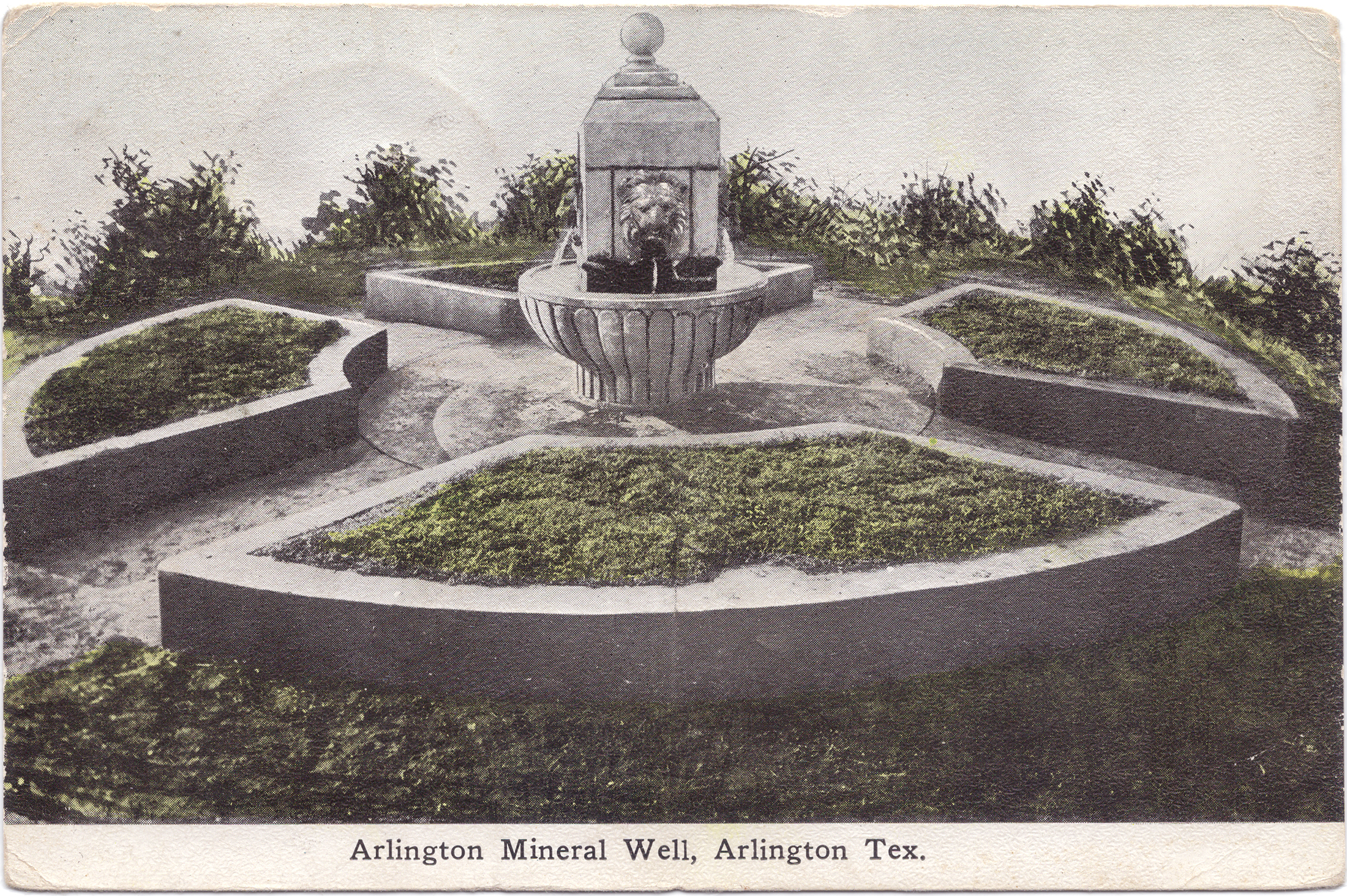
Postcard of the Arlington mineral well, 1914

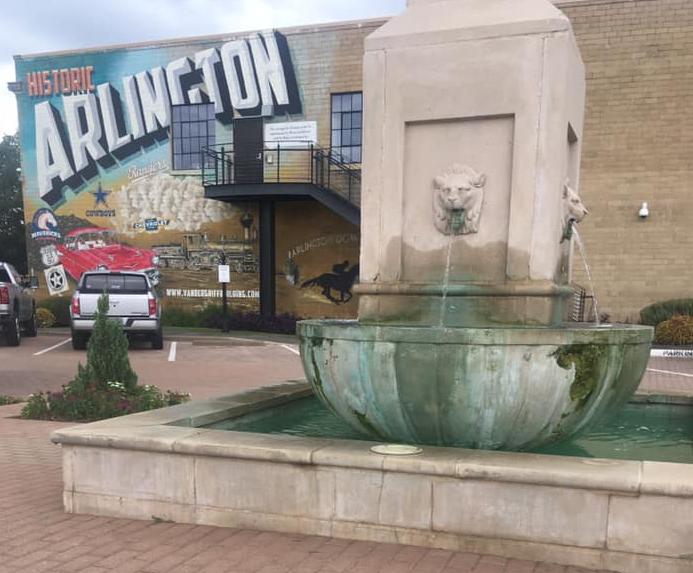
Replica of the historic mineral well in Downtown Arlington, in front of a mural.

- 1892 - “Christmas Eve Massacre” gunfight leaves four men and a horse dead on Main Street near the rail station.
- 1893 -
  - The original mineral well is drilled by a wood-powered steam engine.
  - McKinley-Woodward Home is built by Jesse Stanley McKinley, Arlington's first hardware merchant at 400 E. First. One of the oldest structures in the city.
  - Arlington's first newspaper "The World" is renamed to "The Arlington Democrat."
- 1895 – The city well becomes an official corner point for the city's four new political wards. The well was a focal point for political rallies, parades, cotton sales and the mineral water itself.
- 1896 –
  - William W. McNatt, a merchant and farmer, sells a portion of his farm to sell lots for burial. Many Arlington pioneers are buried thereafter.
  - Hutchison-Smith Home is built on 312 N. Oak, once owned by I. L. Hutchison, Arlington merchant and pioneer.
- 1897
  - Arlington Journal newspaper begins publication, changing its name from "The Arlington Democrat."
  - Mount Olive Baptist congregation formed.
- 1899 – Carver Dixon King becomes mayor for a second term lasting only two months.
- 1900 –
  - William C. Weeks becomes mayor.
  - Population: 1,079.

== 20th century ==
- 1902 –
  - Thomas Benton Collins becomes mayor of Arlington.
  - North Texas Regional Interurban railway begins operating.
  - Carlisle Military Academy established.
  - Arlington residents vote for the town to remain dry.
- 1903 –
  - Texas Legislative Act created the Arlington ISD. Local schools are taken over by the City of Arlington from Carlisle Military Academy.
  - Southwestern Bell establishes service here.
  - Berachah Industrial Home for the Redemption of Erring Girls opens.
- 1904 –
  - T. G. Bailey becomes mayor.
  - The city forms its first high school, and grades 8-11 met at South Side School.
  - Texas & Pacific Railroad Depot is built.
- 1905 – First high school class graduates in Arlington
- 1906 –
  - William C. Weeks becomes mayor again.
  - W. A. Thornton Home is built at 719 W. Abram, the first home in Arlington with gas lights.
  - Ghormley-Arnold Home is built at 404 E. First for Dr. W. I. Ghormley.
- 1907 –
  - Centenary Methodist Episcopal Church South, the first brick church opens on the N.E. corner of Center and Division Streets.
  - Douglass-Potts Home located on 206 W. North is built.
  - Vaught Home at 718 W. Abram is built for T. J. Trammell and purchased by Alex Vaught.
- 1909 –
  - James Park Fielder Sr. becomes mayor for a short two months.
  - Dr. William Harold Davis becomes mayor after Fielder.
- 1910 –
  - Alton C. Barnes becomes mayor.
  - The Commercial Club funds construction of a new mineral well where water flows through lions' heads mounted on a four-sided structure.
  - Population: 1,794.

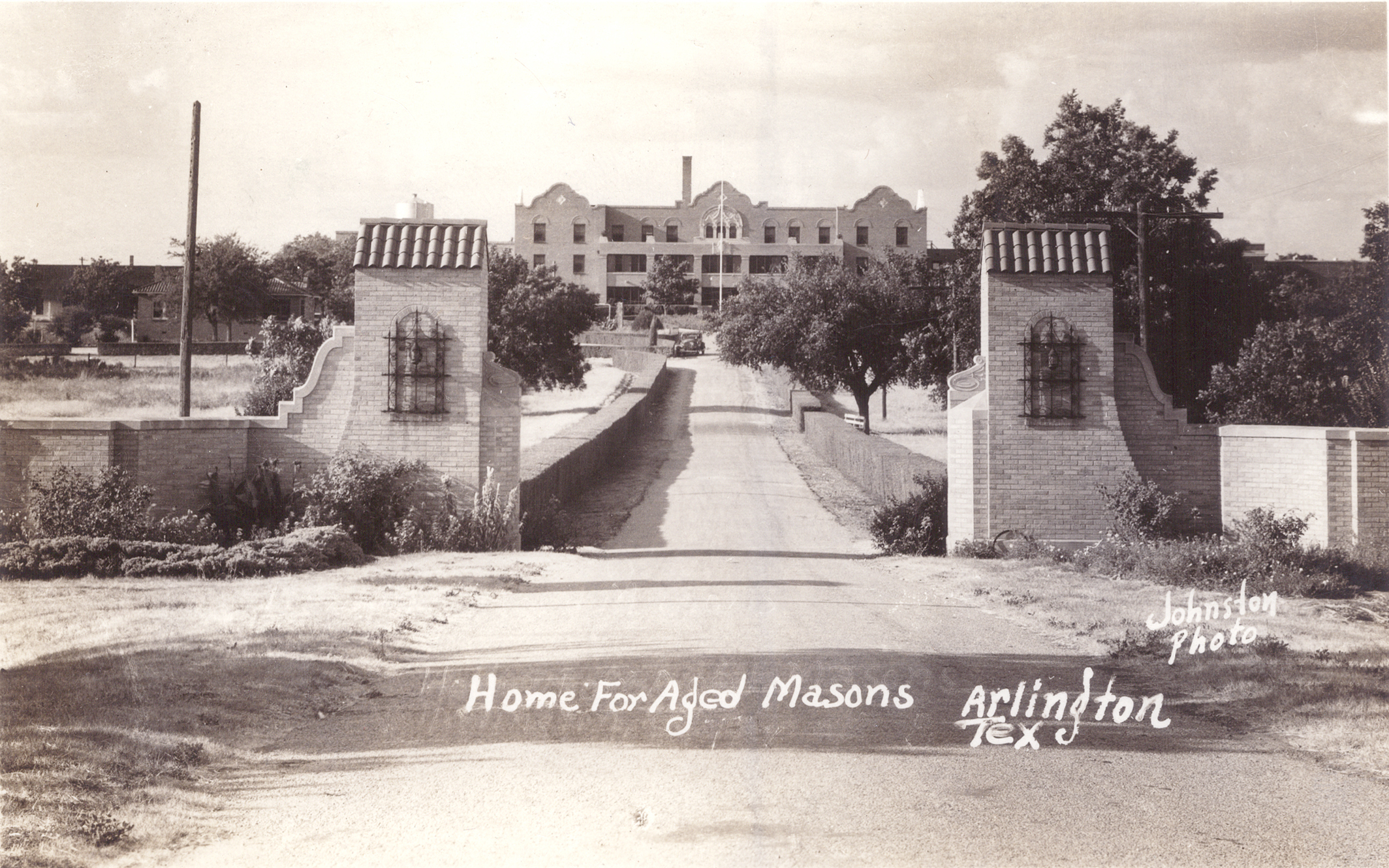
Postcard of the Home for Aged Masons, undated

- 1911 – Masonic Home for Aged Masons opens, now known as Texas Masonic Retirement Center.
- 1912 – Rufus H. Greer becomes mayor of Arlington for the first time.
- 1913 – John M. Elliott Home at 1210 W. Abram is built, an example of a hipped roof bungalow with classical influences.
- 1914 – Historic Fielder House at 1616 W. Abram is built by prominent banker James Park Fielder.
- 1915 – P.F. McKee becomes mayor.
- 1916 –
  - Rufus H. Greer becomes mayor of Arlington for the second time.
  - South Center Street Historic District is planned out by William Rose, housing the city's earliest merchants and craftsmen.
  - Mayor William H., & Ollie Gibbins Rose Home at 501 S. Center is built as the first addition to South Center Street Historic District.
- 1917 –
  - Arlington Military Academy becomes Grubbs Vocational College.
  - Zachary Slaughter opens the city's first car dealership.
  - Slaughter-Geer Home is built by Zack Slaughter for his father and stepmother at 505 S. Center.
  - Wylie F. Altman opens the Altman Ladies Store in Arlington.
- 1918 - Historic Dickerson Home at 400 N. Pecan is built by Martin Luther Dickerson, a cotton broker in Arlington and Ft. Worth.
- 1919 –
  - William H. Rose becomes mayor, bringing with him progression such as city audits, ordinances, the first sidewalks, a modern water system and new businesses.
  - Ransom Hall is built on Grubbs Vocational College campus at 602 S. West as the first administration building.
- 1920 –
  - Population: 3,031.
  - Arlington adopts a home rule city charter.
- 1921 –
  - The highway from Dallas to Arlington is widened and carries interstate traffic through the center of the city.
  - Pulley Home on 201 E. North is built, exemplifying the asymmetrical bungalow architectural style.
- 1922 –
  - Arlington High School built on Cooper St. and Abram St, the first official high school in AISD.
  - Tarrant County starts the first public library in Arlington.
- 1923 –
  - William Green Hiett becomes mayor of Arlington for the first time, during which the first paved roads were built.
  - Grubbs Vocational College changes name to North Texas Agricultural College.
  - Arlington Cemetery Association is chartered, taking care of Arlington Cemetery.
- 1924 –
  - Meadowbrook Park opens as the first park in Arlington.
  - Eastern Star Home is built to provide a home for aged and infirm members of the Eastern Star Organization in Texas at 1201 E. Division.
- 1925 - Hugh Moore becomes mayor of Arlington for a year.

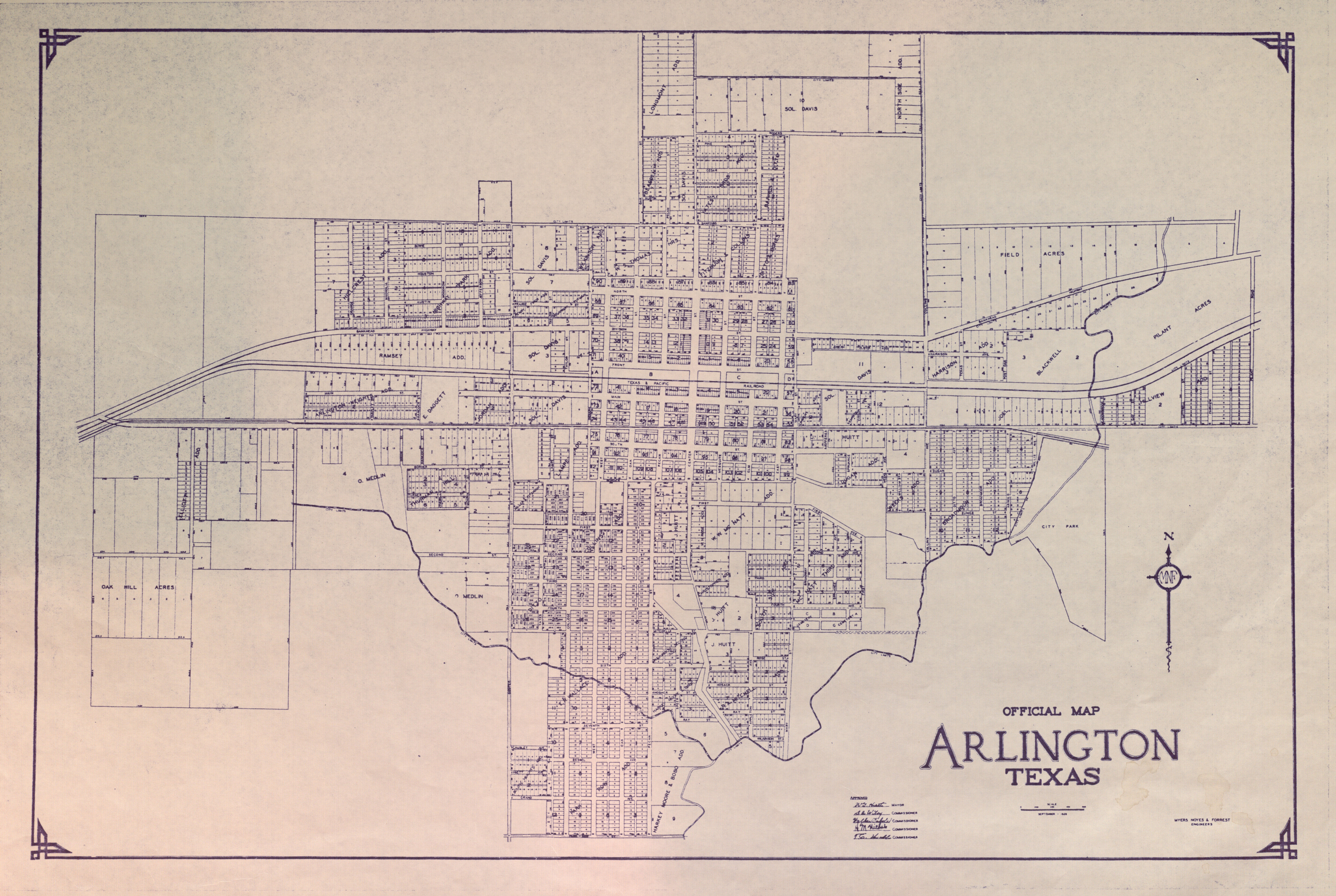
1926 map of Arlington

- 1926 –
  - Elmer L. Taylor becomes mayor for a year.
  - Top O' Hill Terrace changes ownership and converts facilities into an illegal casino.
- 1927 – William Green Hiett becomes mayor of Arlington for the second time.
- 1928 –
  - The first car showroom is opened by the Thannisch Chevrolet Company on the edge of downtown.
  - Construction for the Cooper Hotel begins at 300 N. Center.
  - Preston Hall at 604 S. West is built as a science hall by North Texas Agriculture College.
  - Old Mayor's House at 814 E. Abram is built by cattle broker Dave Martin, once owned by B. C. & Francine Barnes.
- 1929 –
  - Arlington Downs horse-racing track opens.
  - The Cooper Hotel celebrates its grand opening.
  - W. J. Pulley opens Pulley Footwear.
- 1930 – U.S. Census shows Arlington population at 3,700.
- 1931 – John H. Pilant becomes mayor.
- 1932 – O.S. Gray founded a pecan nursery on West Division Street. He develops and makes five varieties of pecan trees.
- 1933 –
  - W.L. Barrett becomes mayor of Arlington.
  - Texas state legislature grants Arlington Downs the first legal parimutuel betting permit.
- 1934 – Arlington Citizen newspaper begins publication.
- 1935 – Wylie F. Altman becomes mayor through World War II.
- 1936 – Berachah Industrial Home for the Redemption of Erring Girls reopens as an orphanage called Berachah Child Institute.
- 1937 –
  - Arlington Downs is sold to commercial developers due to the repeal of betting laws.
  - North Side School opens, now known as Kooken Elementary School.
- 1938 –
  - The interurban rail line serving Arlington ceases operations on Christmas Eve.
  - T.W. (Hooker) Vandergriff purchases the Thannisch Chevrolet Company building and becomes the Thannisch-Vandergriff Bldg.
- 1939 – Arlington Post Office is built by the Federal Works Agency on 200 W. Main St, now the Worthington National Bank Building.
- 1940 – Population: 4,240.
- 1941 – Mural Gathering Pecans by Otis Dozier is painted in the Arlington Post Office building.
- 1942 – Berachah Child Institute orphanage ceases operations.
- Tom J. Vandergriff, Arlington's future revolutionary mayor, graduates from Arlington High School.
- 1947 –
  - B.C. Barnes becomes mayor of Arlington.
  - Texas Rangers police bust the Top O' Hill Terrace illegal casino and speakeasy and shut it down permanently.
  - Cosden Petroleum facility and St. Albans Episcopal Church opens.
- 1949 –
  - The city adopts the city manager form of government.
  - North Texas Agricultural College changes name to Arlington State College.
- 1950 –
  - Arlington Music Hall opens, originally as a walk-in theater.
  - Colonial Apartments opens (approximate date).
  - Population: 7,692.
- 1951 –
  - Tom Vandergriff becomes mayor.
  - The city's famous well on Main and Center is capped permanently under the intersection's pavement due to increased traffic.
- 1952 –
  - Sister city relationship established with Bad Königshofen, Germany.
  - Grace Lutheran church opens.
  - Texas & Pacific Railroad Depot is demolished.
  - James Daniel Cooper's historical house is donated to the city and relocated to Meadowbrook Park, serving as a library.
- 1953 – The city takes over the public library from Tarrant County.
- 1954 –
  - General Motors Corporation plant opens.
  - Berry Elementary School opens.
- 1955 – J.C. Penney and Sears chain stores in business.
- 1956 –
  - American Can Company plant opens.
  - Arlington Baptist College opens on the property of the old speakeasy Top O' Hill Terrace.
  - Arlington High School moves to its second location on Park Row and Cooper.
  - Old Arlington High School building becomes Ousley Jr. High
  - Thornton Elementary School opens.
- 1957 – Dallas-Fort Worth Turnpike opens.
- 1958 –
  - Arlington Downs is completely destroyed by commercial developers.
  - Vandergriff family donates land that becomes Arlington Memorial Hospital
- 1959 – The first candidates for a four-year bachelor's degree enroll at Arlington State College.
- 1960 – Population: 44,775.
- 1961 –
  - City Hall opens.
  - Six Flags Over Texas opens.
  - Six Arlington High girls plunge off a bridge in what is now River Legacy Park, tragically killing half and sparking an urban legend called "The Screaming Bridge."
- 1962 –
  - Public Library opens.
  - Cooper House is leased to the Arlington Woman's Club who refurbished and maintained the home.
- 1963 –
  - Silver Star Carousel debuts at Six Flags Over Texas, originally crafted in 1920s Philadelphia.
  - Sam Houston High School opens.
- 1964 -
  - Arlington Municipal Airport opens.
  - Speelunker Cave opens as Six Flags Over Texas's first dark ride.
  - Meadowbrook Recreation Center is built on the northern edge of Meadowbrook Park.
- 1965 –
  - Turnpike Stadium opens.
  - Dottie Lynn and Church Women United throw the first Annual 4 July parade.
  - Vandergriff Chapel is built.
  - Cooper House is designated as a Texas Historical Landmark.
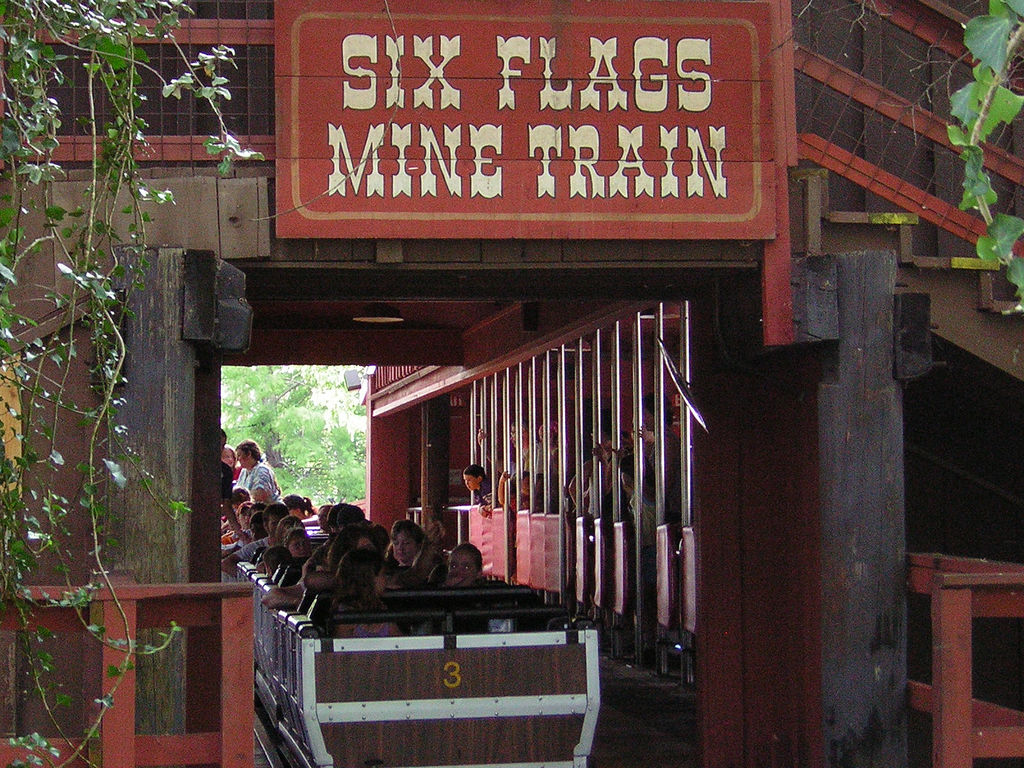
    Runaway Mine Train Coaster
- 1966 –
  - Park Plaza Cinema opens.
  - Runaway Mine Train coaster is built at Six Flags Over Texas.
  - Thannisch-Vandergriff Bldg. closes as a car dealership after 38 years.
- 1967 – Arlington State College becomes the modern University of Texas at Arlington.
- 1968 – AISD sells the old Arlington High School/Ousley Jr. High building to UTA, and the School of Social Work opens.
- 1970 –
  - Forum 303 Mall and Six Flags Mall open.
  - Arlington Genealogical Society formed.
  - Lamar High School opens.
  - Population: 90,643.
- 1972 –
  - Texas Rangers baseball team based in city.
  - Seven Seas Marine Life Park opens.
- 1973 –
  - The Central Library moves to its first Abram Street location.
  - Theatre Arlington opens.
  - Bowie High School opens.
- 1974 –
  - Dallas/Fort Worth Regional Airport opens.
  - Cheryl Calloway is found stabbed to death in the parking lot of Forum 303 Mall, one of Arlington's more infamous cold cases.
- 1977 - S.J. Stovall becomes mayor of Arlington, forming the organization Leadership Arlington during his term.
- 1976 – A monument for the famous Central St. Well is created in front of the Central Library.
- 1979 – The Oakridge School opens.
- 1980 –
  - University of Texas at Arlington's Maverick Stadium open.
  - Fielder House Museum opens.
  - Population: 160,113.
  - Judge Roy Scream opens as SFOT's first wooden rollercoaster.
- 1981 –
  - Texas Historical Marker is installed and dedicated at Berachah Child Institute.
  - Pantera is formed by Arlington teenagers Vinnie Abbott, Darrell Abbott, Terry Glaze, Tommy Bradford and Donnie Hart.
- 1982 –
  - Martin High School opens.
  - Texas Commerce Bank becomes the tallest building in the city.
- 1983 –
  - Harold E. Patterson becomes mayor.
  - Islamic Society Of Arlington founded.
  - Bowie High School closes its original building on Arbrook Boulevard and becomes Workman Junior High School as a result.
- 1985 –
  - Silver Star Carousel is removed from Six Flags Over Texas for a major restoration.
  - Joe Barton becomes U.S. representative for Texas's 6th congressional district.
- 1987 –
  - Richard Greene becomes mayor, increasing funding for police and fire departments, developed plans for a new Texas Rangers ballpark, and led road construction programs.
- 1988 –
  - River Legacy Foundation, a nonprofit 501 (c)(3), is formed as a public/private partnership with City of Arlington Parks and Recreation Department.
  - Silver Star Carousel opens back up at Six Flags Over Texas's park gate plaza, where it still operates.
  - The Parks at Arlington opens.
- 1989 – Mount Olive Baptist Church is rebuilt at 402 N. West St.
- 1990 –
  - Population: 261,721.
  - Texas Giant opens at Six Flags over Texas, the tallest wooden rollercoaster in the world at the time.
  - Elzie Odom becomes the first African-American elected to the Arlington City Council.
- 1991 –
  - Tom J. Vandergriff is inducted into the Texas Rangers Baseball Hall of Fame.
  - S.J. Stovall Park Park opens at 2800 West Sublett Road.
  - Bowie High School reopens and relocates on Highbank Drive.
- 1992 -
  - Speelunker Cave at Six Flags Over Texas is replaced by dark ride Yosemite Sam & the Gold River adventure based on the Looney Tunes characters.
  - The Witness Tree, an old post oak on the old Bardin Farm that grew to be 60 feet tall, is uprooted by Kmart and transplanted, where it later dies.
- 1993 –
  - The commercial tree preservation ordinance is adopted by City Hall following outcry over the Witness Tree's uprooting.
  - Voters authorize the formation of single-member districts.
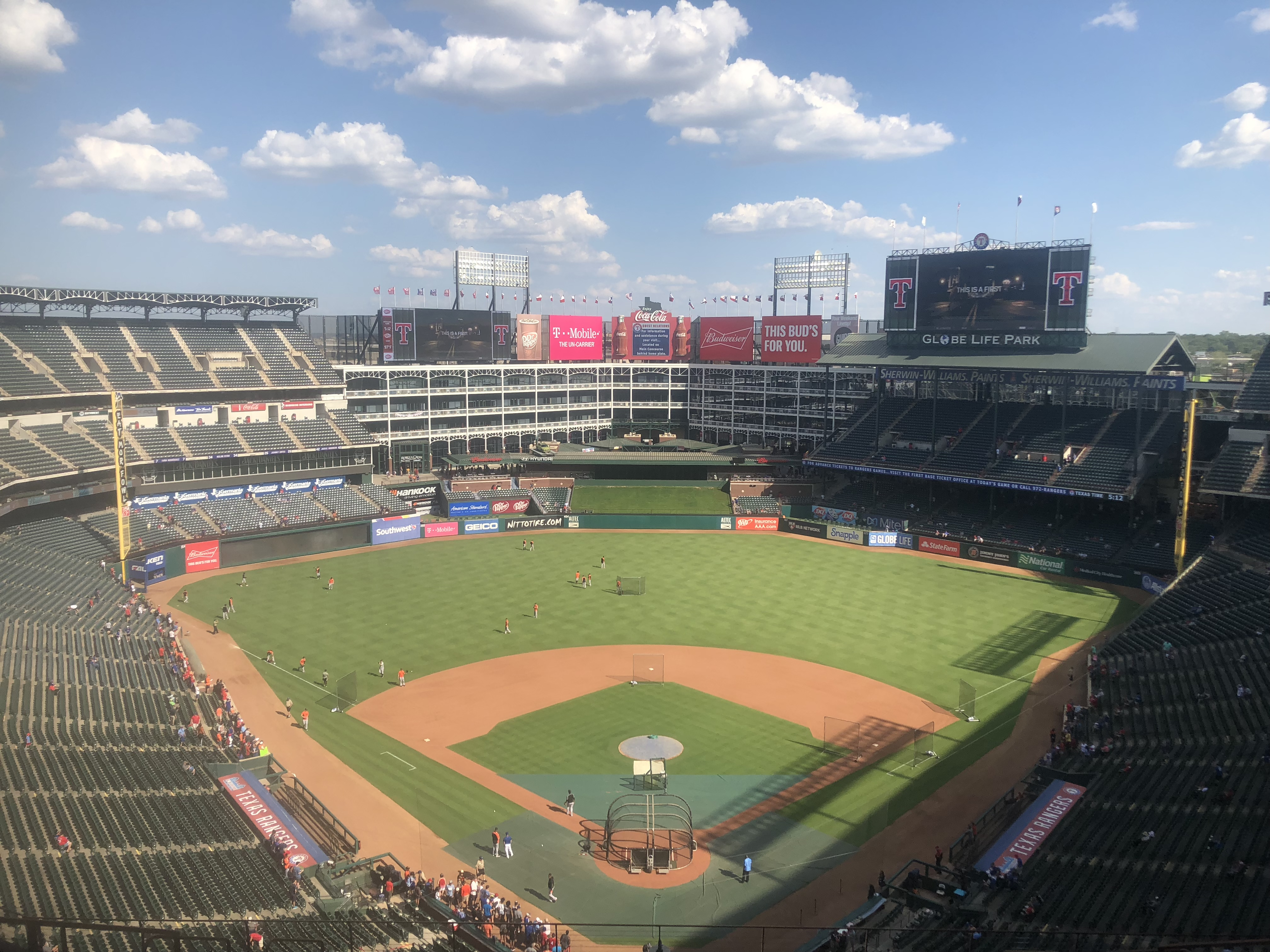
    The Ballpark in 2018.
- 1994 –
  - The Ballpark in Arlington opens.
  - Richard Greene Linear Park opens in honor of the mayor.
  - Arlington Central Library is renamed George W. Hawkes Central Library after prominent newspaper publisher George W. Hawkes.
  - Johnnie High's Country Music Revue moves into the old Arlington Theater.
  - The Arlington Museum of Art opens in the old JCPenney building on Main Street.
- 1995 –
  - The University of Texas at Arlington celebrates its 100-year anniversary.
  - Downtown Arlington, Inc. is formed.
- 1996 –
  - Arlington Morning News begins publication.
  - City website online.
  - Tarrant County College Southeast Campus opens.
  - River Legacy Living Science Center opens to the public.
  - Amber Hagerman is abducted and killed after riding her bike on Abram Street, and the Amber alert is established and named after her.
- 1997 –
  - Elzie Odom becomes Arlington's first African-American mayor, focusing on expanding education as well as theater and arts in downtown.
  - Texas Health Resources nonprofit established.
  - A section of turf located behind Center Field at the Ballpark in Arlington is named Greene's Hill for the mayor's contributions to the Texas Rangers baseball club.
- 1998 – Cooper House is destroyed in an accidental fire on Halloween night.
- 1999 – Elzie Odom Athletic Center opens at 1601 N.E. Green Oaks Boulevard.
- 2000 –
  - Old Town Historic District opens.
  - Population: 332,969.

== 21st century ==
- 2001 –Eastern Star Home closes facilities.
- 2002 –
  - Mansfield Summit High School and Seguin High School open.
  - AMC Parks cinema opens.
  - Arlington voters overwhelmingly approve a street maintenance sales tax program that the city proposed.
- 2003 – Robert Cluck becomes mayor.
- 2004 –
  - Voters 'okay' a tax hike that helps pay for a brand new stadium for the Dallas Cowboys.
  - Mansfield Timberview High School established.
- 2005 - The commercial tree preservation ordinance is extended to residential developments.
- 2006 –
  - Downtown Arlington Management Corporation established.
  - Runaway Mine Train is designated an ACE Coaster Landmark by the American Coaster Enthusiasts.
  - Arlington celebrates its 135th birthday.
- 2007 –
  - UT Arlington becomes the second largest campus in the University of Texas system.
  - The Highlands shopping district opens.
  - Construction is set to begin on an upscale development called Glorypark by AT&T Stadium.
- 2008 –
  - Opening night of the Levitt Pavilion for the Performing Arts in Arlington with more than 1,800 people in attendance.
  - Plans for Glorypark by AT&T Stadium are shelved.
- 2009 –
  - Cowboys Stadium opens.
  - Texas Giant closes for renovations as the wooden coaster ages.
- 2010 – Population: 365,438 city; 6,371,773 metro; 19,728,244 megaregion.
- 2011 -
  - Texas Christkindl Market commemorates its first year during the holiday season.
  - Pentatonix forms and wins The Sing-Off, founded by Martin High School alumni.
  - New Texas Giant opens up as a hybrid wooden-steel coaster.
- 2012 –
  - University of Texas's College Park Center opens.
  - Pentatonix returns to their hometown to perform a free concert at the Levitt Pavilion, breaking the attendance record with 12,000 people attending.
- 2013 –
  - Former Eastern Star Home is demolished.
  - Metro Arlington Xpress (public transit) begins operating.
  - Arlington becomes the Fall location for retro gaming convention Retropalooza.
- 2014 –
  - Arlington changes its logo and slogan to "American Dream City."
- 2015 –
  - W. Jeff Williams becomes mayor.
  - George W. Hawkes Central Library is demolished after 40 years of service.
  - The original Sam Houston High School building demolishes.
- 2016 –
  - Proposition to build new stadium for Texas Rangers is passed.
  - The City and the Arlington Museum of Art begin a public art project called "Stars of Texas" with painted star statues scattered around the city.
  - Downtown Arlington is designated as a cultural district by the State of Texas.
- 2017 –
  - AISD opens the Dan Dipert Career and Technical Center after it was approved in a 2014 bond.
  - Officials breaks ground on the new Texas Rangers stadium.
  - Ride-sharing company Via becomes the city's only public transportation service, replacing Metro Arlington Xpress. First-year operations cost taxpayers $922,500.
  - Texas Christkind Market combines with Enchant Christmas to create the Enchant Christmas Light Maze and Market for the next two years.
- 2018 –
  - George W. Hawkes Central Library second location celebrates its grand opening.
  - Arlington Convention Center re-opens as Esports Stadium Arlington & Expo Center, the largest dedicated esports facility in North America.
  - Arlington citizens vote to implement term limits on the city council.
  - Yosemite Sam & the Gold River Adventure at SFOT semi-permanently closes after a bad storm.
- 2019 –
  - AISD opens the Arlington College and Career High School.
  - Live! By Loews opens as a joint venture between Loews Hotels and the Texas Rangers to bring an upscale hospitality experience to the entertainment district.
  - Arlington is chosen as the home of the National Medal of Honor Museum, set to be built in 2024.
  - General Motors employees strike for 40 days for additional compensation and benefits.
  - UTA receives funding to replace their School of Social Work building, the first Arlington High School building.
  - Medical City Arlington opens their Medical City Women's Hospital.
- 2020 –
  - Globe Life Field celebrates a delayed opening for AISD high school graduation, and a few months later for a crowdless MLB game.
  - Globe Life Field hosts the entirety of the World Series, the first time the World Series has played at a single location since 1944.
- 2021 -
  - Via Rideshare service expands city-wide. The annual taxpayer expense becomes $2.2 million.
- 2023-
  - A reimagined version of the original downtown mineral well as a fountain and clock tower is constructed and completed, dubbed the "Mineral Well Park Plaza."
  - Texas Rangers win the 2023 World Series, the first world series win in the history of the franchise since arriving in Arlington in 1972.

== See also ==
- List of mayors of Arlington, Texas
- National Register of Historic Places listings in Tarrant County, Texas
- Timelines of other cities in the North Texas area of Texas: Dallas, Denton, Fort Worth, Garland, Irving, Plano, Wichita Falls

== Bibliography ==
- "Arlington". Texas State Gazetteer and Business Directory. St. Louis: R.L. Polk & Co. 1884 – via Internet Archive.
- "Arlington". Texas State Gazetteer and Business Directory. Detroit: R.L. Polk & Co. 1890 – via Internet Archive.
- Freese; et al. (1952), City Plan for Arlington, Texas
- Arista Joyner, ed. (1976), Arlington, Texas: Birthplace of the Metroplex, Arlington Bicentennial-Centennial Celebration Committee
- Janet L. Schmelzer, Where the West Begins: Fort Worth and Tarrant County (Northridge, California: Windsor, 1985)
- Komatsu Architecture (1997), "Final Arlington Historic Resources Survey Update", Community Development & Planning – via City of Arlington
- Terri Myers (1999), The Hill: Arlington's African-American Communities, Austin TX
- Tom Cogdell (October 2013), "Arlington's First Property Owners – 1876", Newsletter, Texas: Arlington Historical Society
