= Spring Palace =

Spring Palace may refer to:

- Texas Spring Palace, an agricultural fairground in Fort Worth, Texas in 1889–1890
- Nicolae Ceaușescu's Spring Palace in Bucharest, Romania (now a guest house for VIPs)
- In Tang dynasty China, poet Wang Changling wrote "A Song of the Spring Palace".
- Spring Palace is described in the early 11th century novel-romance, The Tale of Genji
