= Timeline of Dallas =

This article contains a timeline of major events in the history of Dallas, Texas (US). It serves as an abridged supplement to the main history article for the city and its several subarticles on periods in the city's history.

== 19th century ==
- 1841 – John Neely Bryan settled on the east bank of the Trinity River, future location of Downtown Dallas.
- 1856 – Texas Legislature granted Dallas a town charter.
- 1860 – Fire destroyed most businesses on the courthouse square; three enslaved men hanged on suspicion of arson
- 1872-1873 – The Houston and Texas Central (1872) and Texas and Pacific (1873) railroads arrive
- 1888 – The Dallas Zoo was opened, making it the second zoological garden in the country.
- 1890 – Population: 38,067.
- 1900 – Population: 42,638.

== 20th century ==
=== 1900s–1950s ===
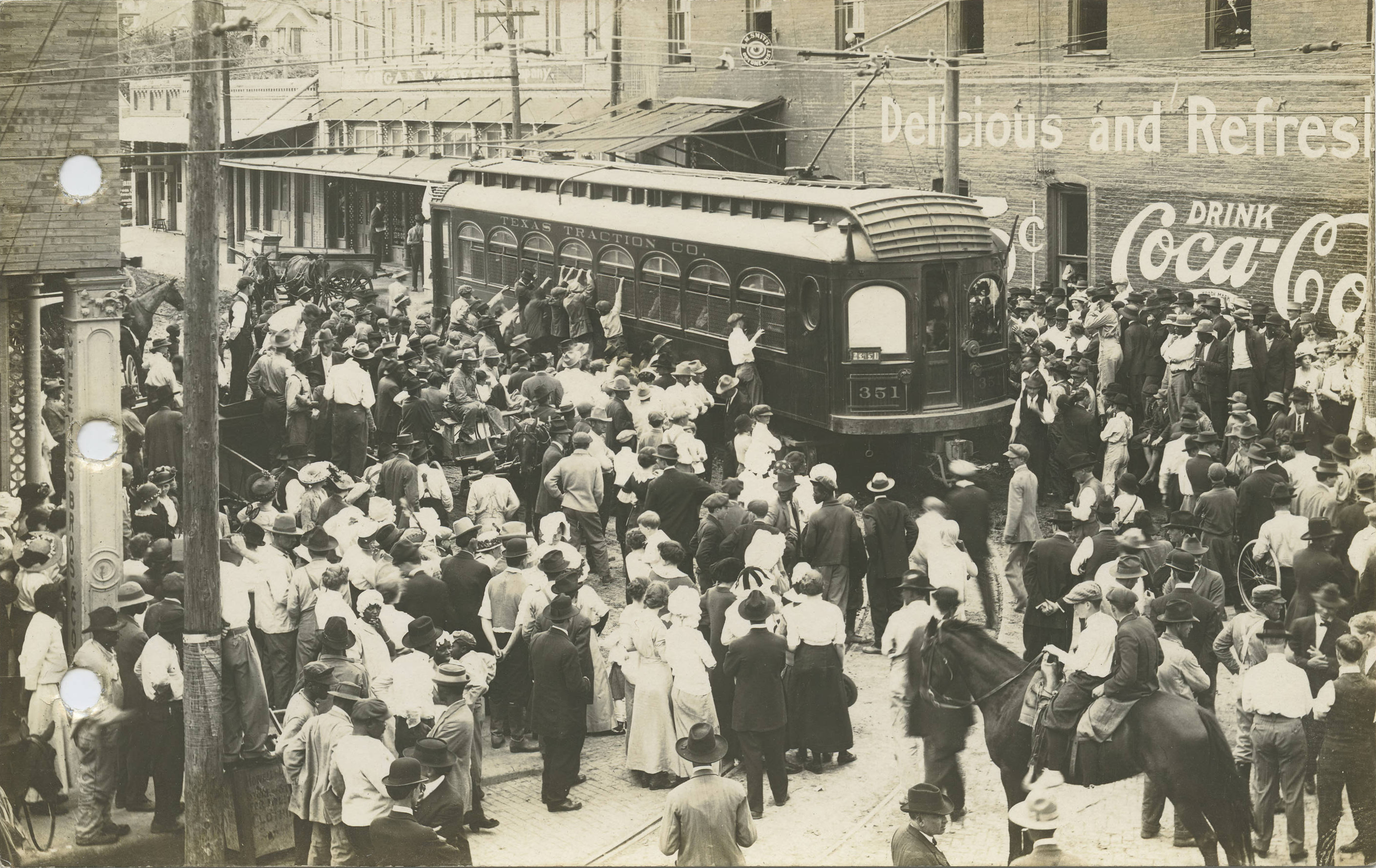
First Day of Passenger Service, Dallas & Sherman Interurban Railroad, 1908

- 1901 – Dallas Public Library was opened.
- 1903 – Dallas annexed town of Oak Cliff on the south side of the Trinity River, expanding its size by a third.
- 1908 – The Great Trinity River flood
  - Texas Electric launched Dallas interurban service.
- 1910 – Population: 92,104.
- 1917 – October 19: U.S. military Love Field (airfield) was created.
- 1920
  - WRR radio began its broadcasting.
  - Population: 158,976.
- 1921 – Kirbys Pig Stand eatery in business.
- 1922 - The Magnolia Building was opened. Its trademark neon Pegasus that would be erected in 1934 would come to be one of the city's most recognizable landmarks and representative of the city itself.
- 1927
  - Love Field (airport) was opened for civilian use.
  - The world's first convenience store was opened in Dallas by the Southland Ice Company, which would eventually become 7-Eleven.
- 1930
  - Columbus Marion Joiner struck oil 100 miles (160 km) northeast of Dallas. Dallas became a center of commerce for the Texas oil trade.
  - Bonnie and Clyde met in the West Dallas neighborhood of Dallas and began their crime spree across Texas, Oklahoma, and Louisiana.
  - Population: 260,475.
- 1934 – The criminal duo Bonnie and Clyde were buried in Dallas after being killed by police in Louisiana on May 23.
- 1949 – WFAA-TV and KRLD-TV (television) began broadcasting.
- 1958 – While working for Texas Instruments, Jack Kilby created the world's first integrated circuit at a Dallas laboratory in September, sparking an electronics revolution that changed the world and created a global market now worth more than $1 trillion a year.

=== 1960s–1990s ===
- 1963 – November 22 – United States President John F. Kennedy was assassinated in a motorcade while traveling west on Elm Street in Dealey Plaza. This event is memorialized by the nearby Kennedy Memorial and by the Sixth Floor Museum in the former Texas School Book Depository at the corner of Elm and Houston, Kennedy died at Parkland Memorial Hospital, 30 minutes after the shooting.
- 1965 - NorthPark Center was opened - on 97 acres leased from the Caruth Family Foundation by developer Raymond Nasher, anchored by Neiman Marcus, Titches-Goettinger, Pennys and other stores.
- 1968 – Cooper Aerobics Center in business.
- 1972 - City logo design was adopted.
- 1974 – Dallas/Fort Worth International Airport was opened.
- 1976 – Thanks-Giving Square was completed in downtown Dallas.
- 1978 – The soap opera Dallas was debuted with a CBS miniseries that was filmed entirely in Dallas. The actual series was later almost all filmed in a Los Angeles studio. The internationally popular show ran for 13 years.
- 1979 – US Congress passed the Wright Amendment, restricting passenger air service out of Love Field Airport.
- 1981 – USS Dallas (SSN-700), a nuclear submarine named after the city, was commissioned.
- 1984 – Dallas hosted the 1984 Republican National Convention
- 1985
  - The 72-story Bank of America Plaza (then InterFirst Plaza) was opened as the tallest building in Dallas.
  - Dallas Municipal Archives was established.
  - Teatro Dallas (bilingual theatre) was founded.
- 1987 - Annette Strauss was inaugurated as the first female mayor of Dallas.
- 1990 – Population: 1,006,877.
- 1993 - Old 97's musical group was formed.
- 1994 – Dallas hosted the 1994 World Cup through the quarter-finals.
- 1996 – Dallas Area Rapid Transit began operating the first light rail system in Texas (and the Southwest) and first commuter rail in Texas.
- 1997 – Congress passed the Shelby Amendment, which simplified some of the Wright Amendment restrictions on Love Field Airport.
- 2000 – December 18 – Dallas Area Rapid Transit opened the first full-service subway station in Texas (and the American South), Cityplace Station.

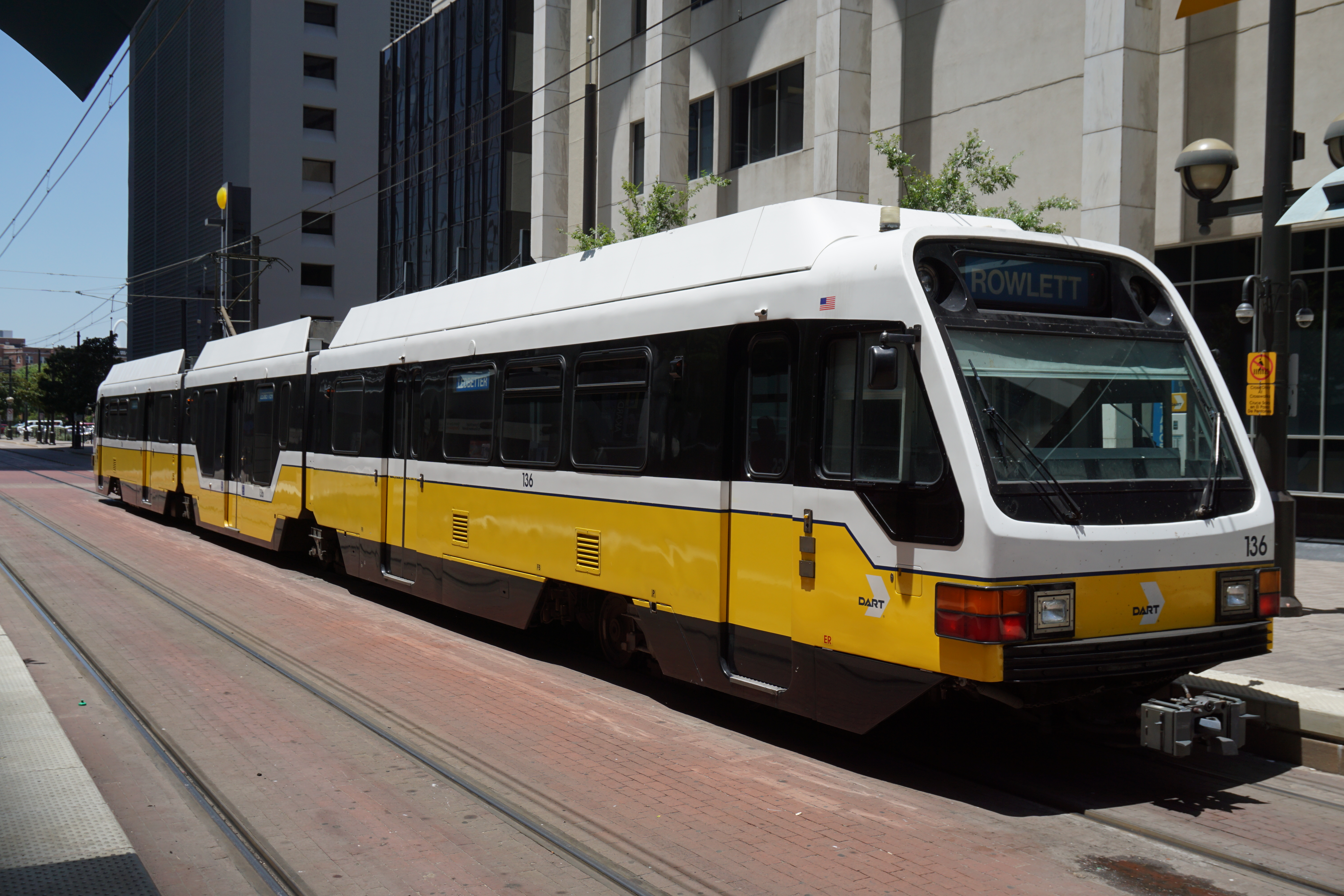
DART Blue Line train at Akard station in downtown Dallas heading towards Downtown Rowlett station

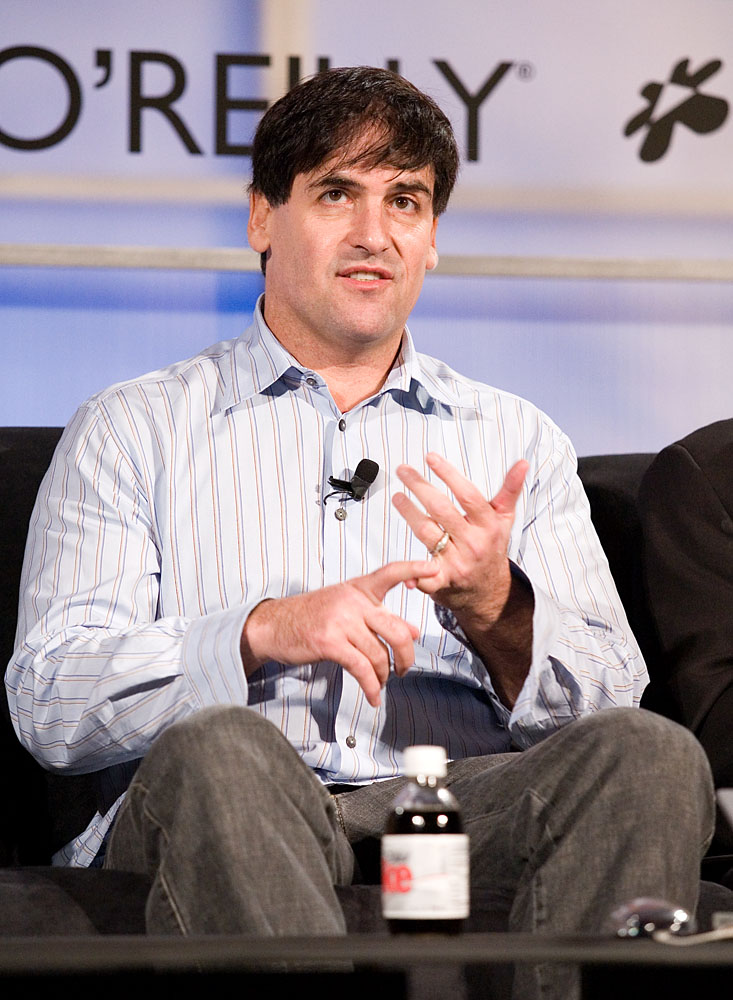
Cuban at the Web 2.0 Conference in 2005

January 2000, just a few months into the season. The deal has proven to be a financial success for Cuban and the team. The Mavericks are currently valued at $2.7 billion — ninth-highest in the NBA – according to Forbes.

== 21st century ==
- 2010 – Population: city 1,197,816; megaregion 19,728,244.
- 2014 – September 7 – Dallas became home of the first case of the Ebola Virus in the United States.
- 2016 – July 7 – A mass shooting targeting police officers during a protest occurred in downtown Dallas, resulting in the deaths of five officers along with the shooter, and the injuries of nine other officers and two civilians.
- 2019 – June 17 – A brief shooting occurred outside of the Earle Cabell Federal Building, leading to the death of the perpetrator and the injury of one other person.

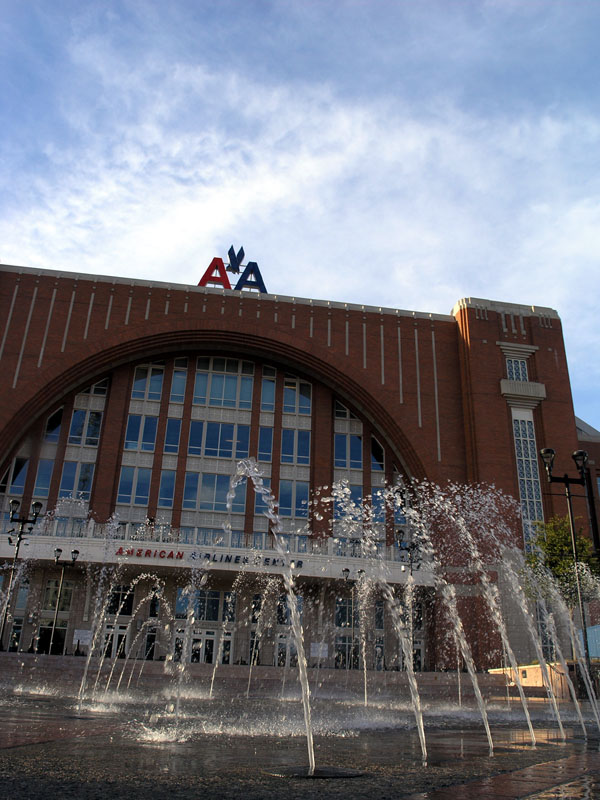
Mavericks began playing at the American Airlines Center in 2001.

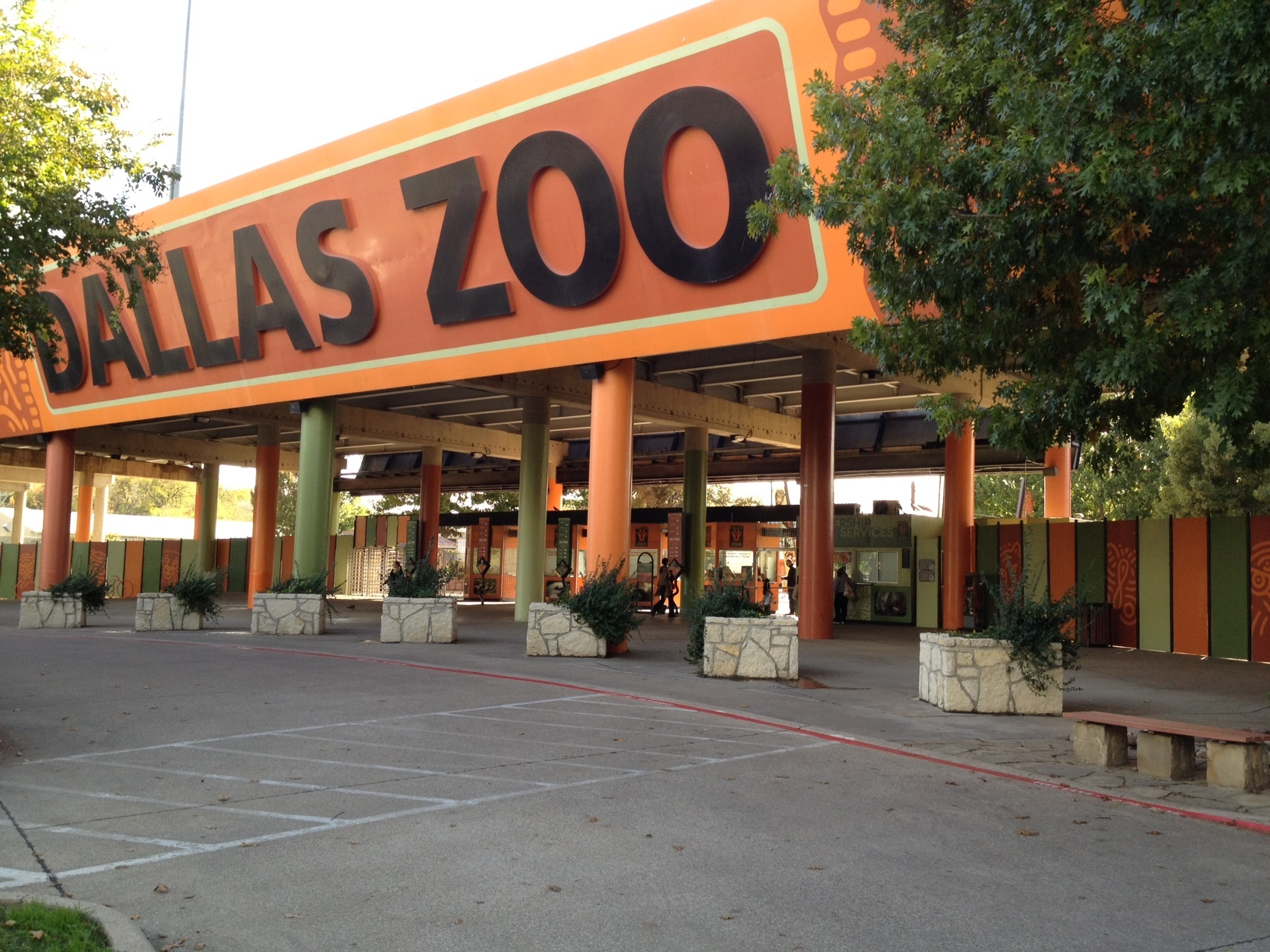
Dallas Zoo Entrance in 2011

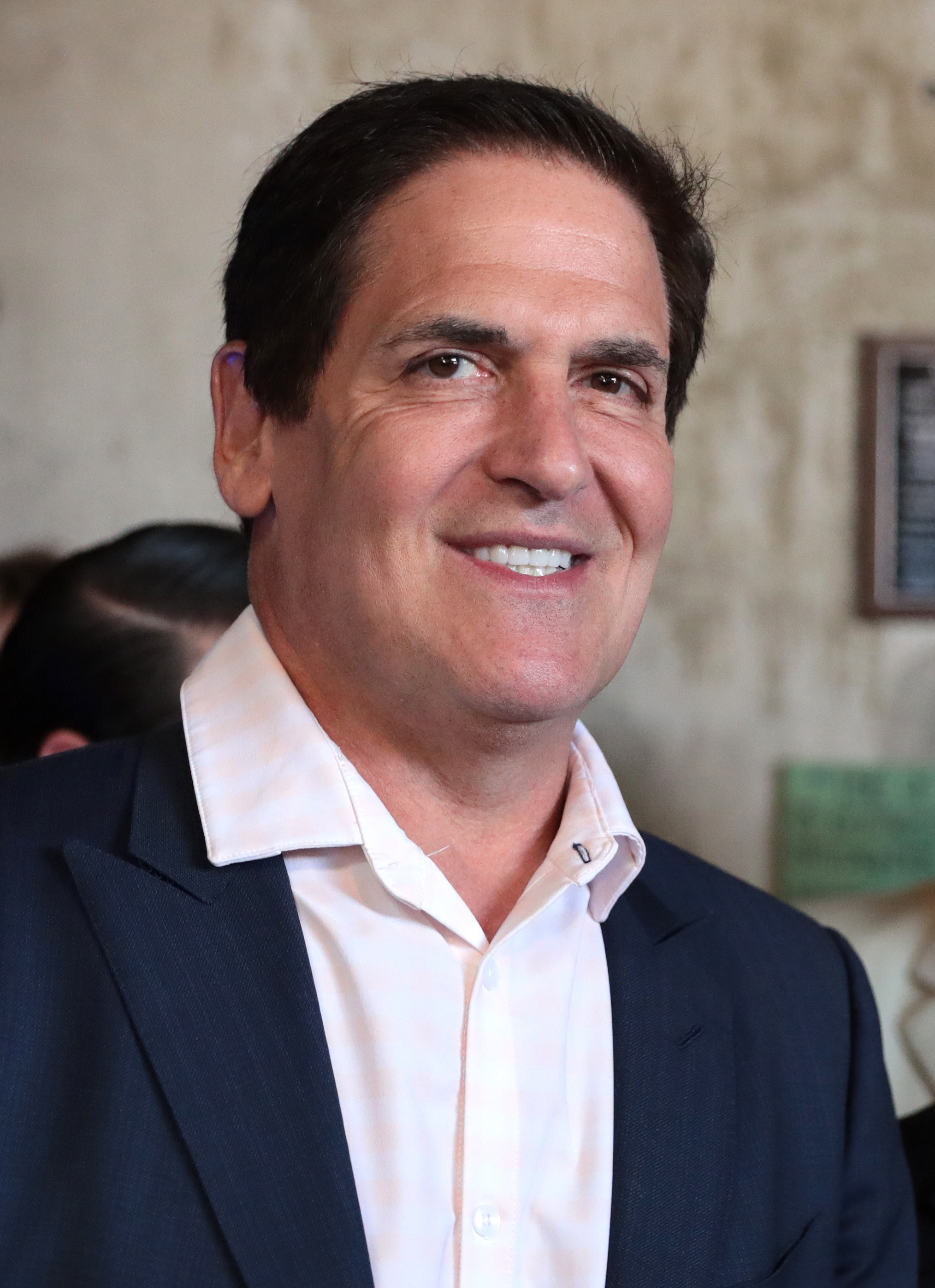
Mark Cuban in 2019, owner of the Dallas Mavericks

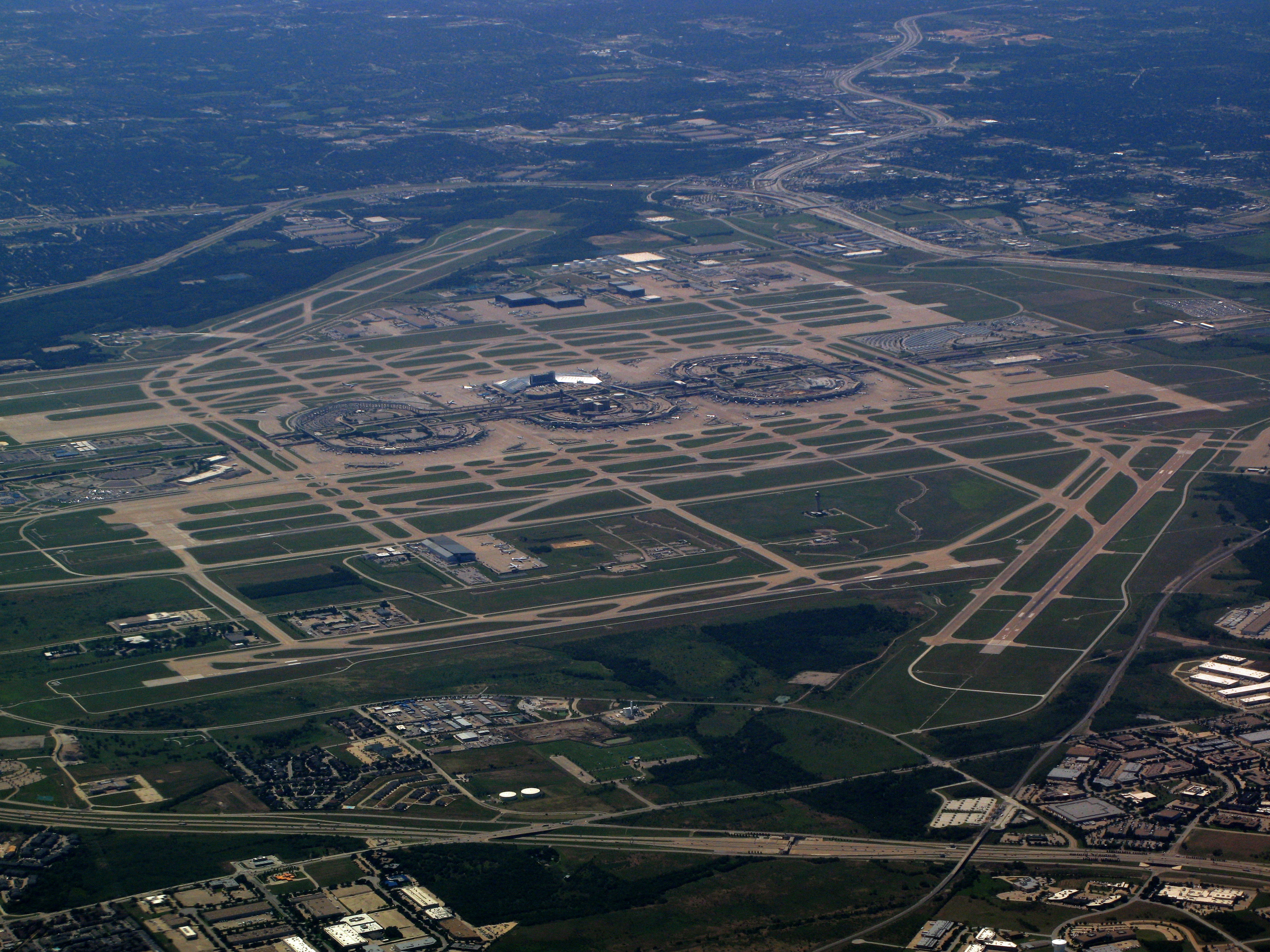
Dallas/Fort Worth International Airport (IATA: DFW, ICAO: KDFW, FAA LID: DFW) in 2013

== See also ==
- Timelines of other cities in the North Texas area of Texas: Arlington, Denton, Fort Worth, Garland, Irving, Plano, Wichita Falls
