= Timeline of Wichita Falls, Texas =

The following is a timeline of the history of the city of Wichita Falls, Texas, USA.

== 19th century ==
- 1879 - Barwise family settles in area.
- 1880 - Population: 433.
- 1881 - First United Methodist Church built.
- 1882 - Fort Worth and Denver City railroad begins operating.
- 1883 - First Baptist Church founded.
- 1886 - Drought begins.
- 1887 - Wichita Weekly Times newspaper begins publication.
- 1889
  - Town of Wichita Falls incorporated.
  - Otis T. Bacon becomes mayor.
- 1890 - Population: 1,978.
- 1896 - "Lynching of two bank robbers."
- 1900
  - Ladies Library Association organized.
  - Lake Wichita created near town.

== 20th century ==
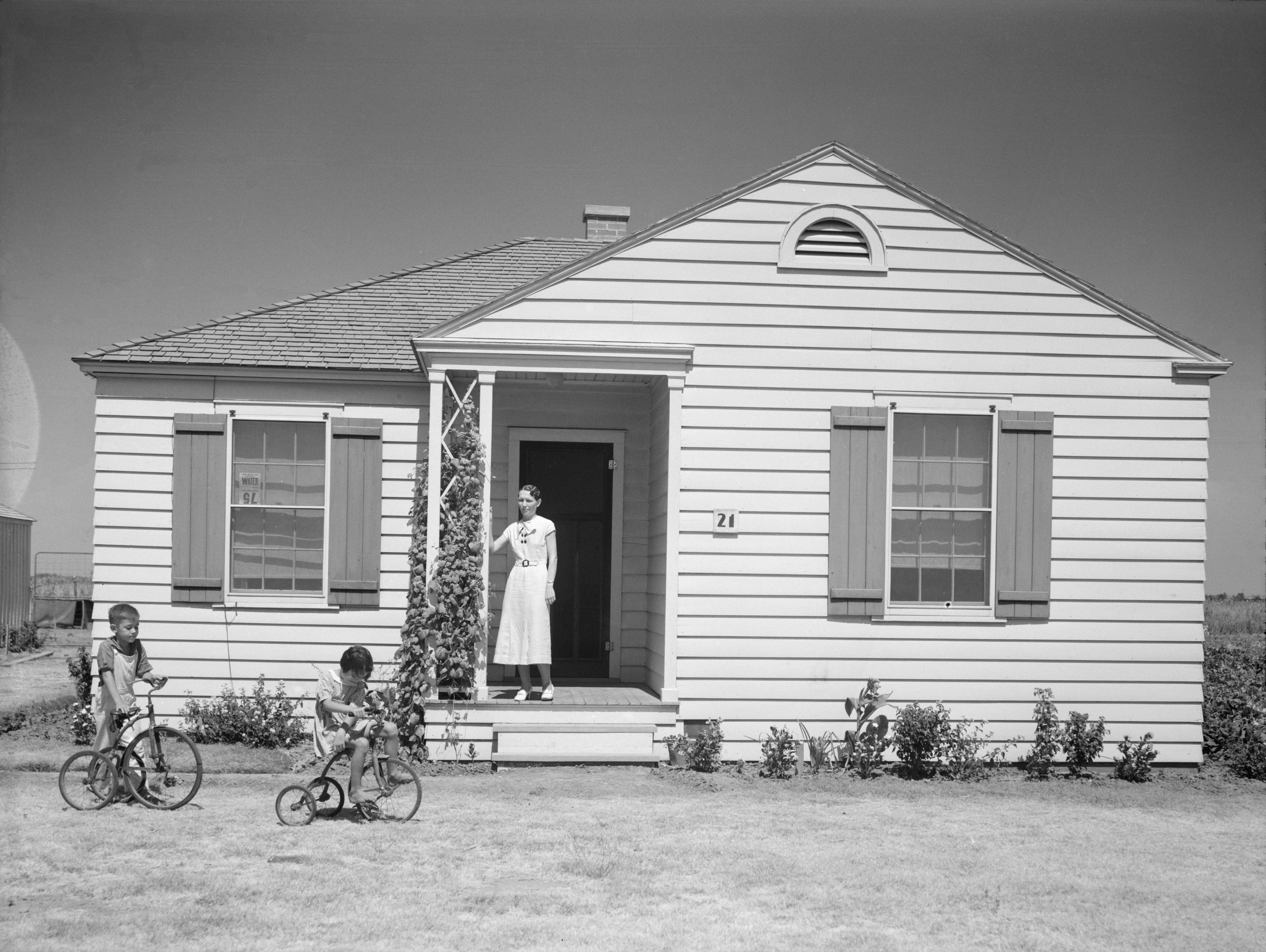
House in Wichita Gardens, built circa 1933 by U.S. Department of Interior Subsistence Homesteads Division

- 1909 - Electric streetcar begins operating.
- 1910
  - U.S. military Call Field (airfield) begins operating near town.
  - Union Station built.
  - Gem Theatre (cinema) in business.
  - Population: 8,200.
- 1911 - Electra oil field begins operating in vicinity of town.
- 1912 - Ball Brothers Glass Manufacturing Company plant in business.
- 1913 - Palace Theatre in business.
- 1917 - Drought begins.
- 1918
  - Kemp Public Library opens.
  - Burkburnett oil field discovered near Wichita Falls; oil boom begins.
- 1920
  - Burnett Street Bridge and Temple Israel synagogue built.
  - Population: 40,079.
- 1922
  - Wichita Falls Junior College established.
  - Women's "Manuscript Club" organized.
- 1924 - Lake Kemp and Lake Diversion created in vicinity of town.
- 1927 - Scott Avenue Bridge and Municipal Auditorium built.
- 1928 - "Airline passenger service" begins.
- 1930 - May 11: Dust storm.
- 1932 - Town/county 50th anniversary observed.
- 1933 - Wichita Gardens Homestead Colony for urban poor created (approximate date).
- 1937
  - Scott Avenue Overpass built.
  - Parking meters introduced.
- 1938
  - KWFT radio begins broadcasting.
  - Wichita Falls Day Nursery built.
  - Kamay oil discovered near Wichita Falls.
- 1941 - U.S. military Sheppard Field begins operating.
- 1947 - Lake Kickapoo created in vicinity of Wichita Falls.
- 1948 - U.S. military Sheppard Air Force Base active.
- 1950
  - Midwestern University active.
  - Population: 68,042.
- 1952 - Grant Drive-In cinema in business.
- 1953 - KAUZ-TV and KFDX-TV (television) begin broadcasting.
- 1960 - Population: 101,724.
- 1963 - Wichita Falls Ballet Theatre founded.
- 1964
  - April 3: Tornado.
  - Gates Rubber Company plant in business.
- 1966
  - Wichita Falls joins the Nortex Regional Planning Commission.
  - Lake Arrowhead created in vicinity of Wichita Falls.
- 1969 - Wilson Memorial Parkway dedicated.
- 1970
  - School's Memorial Stadium opens.
  - Board of Commerce and Industry active.
- 1978 - Wichita Falls Transit System begins operating.
- 1979 - April 10: 1979 Red River Valley tornado outbreak.
- 1982 - Wichita Falls Area Food Bank established.
- 1986 - Artificial waterfall built at Lucy Park.
- 1987 - Times Record News in publication.
- 1995 - Mac Thornberry becomes U.S. representative for Texas's 13th congressional district.
- 1999 - City website online (approximate date).

== 21st century ==
- 2010
  - Glenn Barham becomes mayor.
  - Population: 104,553.
  - Racially-motivated shooting spree kills one and injures four others, before the suspect committed suicide.

== See also ==
- Wichita Falls history
- List of mayors of Wichita Falls, Texas
- National Register of Historic Places listings in Wichita County, Texas
- Timelines of other cities in the North Texas area of Texas: Arlington, Dallas, Denton, Fort Worth, Garland, Irving, Plano

== Bibliography ==
- "Wichita Falls". Texas State Gazetteer and Business Directory. St. Louis: R.L. Polk & Co. 1884.
- "Wichita Falls". Texas State Gazetteer and Business Directory. Detroit: R.L. Polk & Co. 1890.
- "Wichita Falls". Texas State Gazetteer and Business Directory. Detroit: R.L. Polk & Co. 1914.
- Ellis A. Davis; Edwin H. Grobe, eds. (1926). "(Wichita Falls)". New Encyclopedia of Texas. Dallas: Texas Development Bureau. pp. 103–106. circa 1926?
- Jonnie R. Morgan, The History of Wichita Falls (Wichita Falls, 1931)
- Federal Writers' Project (1940), "Wichita Falls", Texas: A Guide to the Lone Star State, American Guide Series, New York: Hastings House, hdl:2027/mdp.39015002677667 – via HathiTrust
- Duty, Michael (1982). Wichita Falls: A Century of Photographs. Wichita Falls: Midwestern State University Press.
- Kelly, Louise (1982). Wichita County Beginnings. Burnet, Texas: Eakin Press.
- Wilson, Steve (1982). Wichita Falls: A Pictorial History. Norfolk, Virginia: Donning.
- Wishart, David J., ed. (2004). "Cities and Towns: Wichita Falls, Texas". Encyclopedia of the Great Plains. University of Nebraska Press. ISBN 0-8032-4787-7.
- Kenneth E. Hendrickson Jr. (2009). Wichita Falls. Images of America. Arcadia. ISBN 978-1-4396-4625-0.
