= Fort Worth Fire Department =

Fire Department in Fort Worth, Texas

Operational area
- Country: United States
- State: Texas
- City: Fort Worth

Agency overview
- Established: May 2, 1873
- Annual calls: 136,242 (2022)
- Employees: 1,036 (2023)
- Annual budget: $193,272,915 (2023)
- Staffing: Career
- Fire chief: Raymond Hill
- EMS level: ALS
- IAFF: 440
- Motto: To serve and protect our community through education, prevention, preparedness and response

Facilities and equipment
- Battalions: 8
- Stations: 46 (45 year round, 1 seasonal)
- Engines: 38 (1 seasonal)
- Trucks: 2
- Platforms: 3
- Quints: 14
- Rescues: 3
- Tenders: 2
- Airport crash: 5
- Wildland: 15
- Rescue boats: 3

Website
- Official website
- IAFF website

The Fort Worth Fire Department provides firefighting, rescue and emergency medical services to the city of Fort Worth, Texas.

== Mission ==
The Fort Worth Fire Department provides fire protection, fire prevention, arson investigation, and first responder emergency medical services to the city of Fort Worth, Texas.

=== Mission statement ===
“To serve and protect our community through education, prevention, preparedness and response.”

== History ==
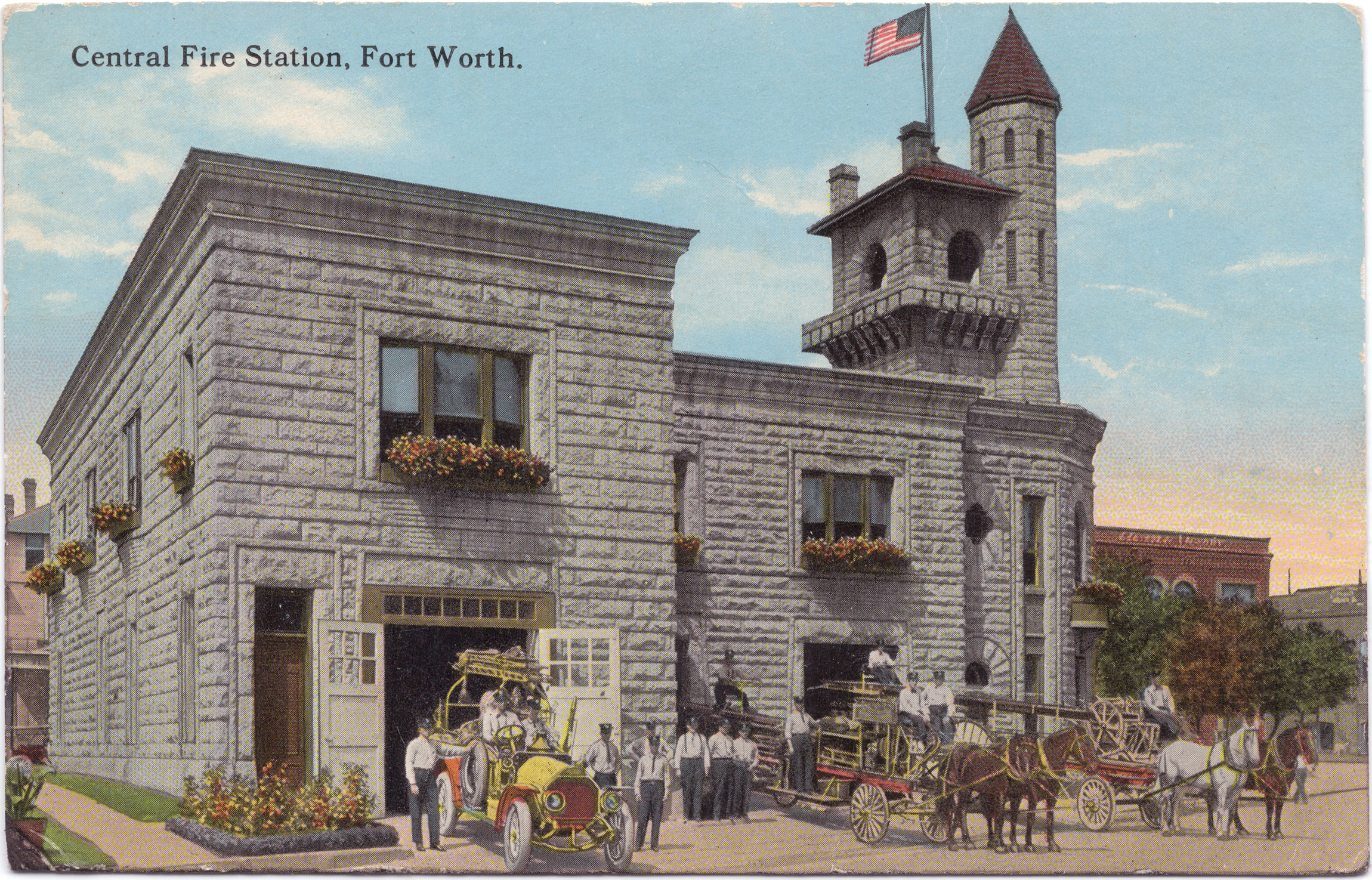
Postcard of Central Fire Station in Fort Worth, undated

=== First Volunteer Fire Department ===
In 1872 Fort Worth was incorporated by the Texas Legislature. It experienced rapid growth, later that year, when the plans for the Texas and Pacific Railway were announced. At that time most of the structures in the city were poorly built wooden structures or tents that burned easily. As was customary at the time, these structures were heated by wood stoves or fireplaces. Due to these conditions, large destructive fires were commonplace.

In 1873 Captain Buckley C. Paddock organized the Fort Worth's first fire company, Hook and Ladder Company #1. The company consisted of 60 volunteers. The company began raising funds and purchased a hook and ladder wagon for $600. Three years later a Silsby steam engine was purchased for the sum of $6,250 and the city soon realized that it need a reliable source of water for fire fighting. The city council then allocated the sum of $1,025 for the construction of 3 cisterns. These cisterns collectively held 63,000 gallons of water.

In 1882 Fort Worth constructed a system of water mains. This system had six miles of piping and a capacity of 4 million gallons of water a day. The city also installed an electric fire alarm system, the first ever in Texas, and 11 Gamewell pull boxes. However these and other fire department improvements had begun to strain the city's budget.

=== Texas Spring Palace fire ===
On the night of May 30, 1890 a fire broke out on the second floor of the Texas Spring Palace. An estimated 7,000 people were there when the fire started. In minutes, the building was engulfed in flames and guests began jumping out of second-story windows. There only one fatality, an Englishman named Al Hayne, who perished after rescuing several people from the fire. The fire at the Spring Palace became the catalyst for further improvements in fire equipment and personnel: on December 1, 1893, Fort Worth's first professional fire company was incorporated.

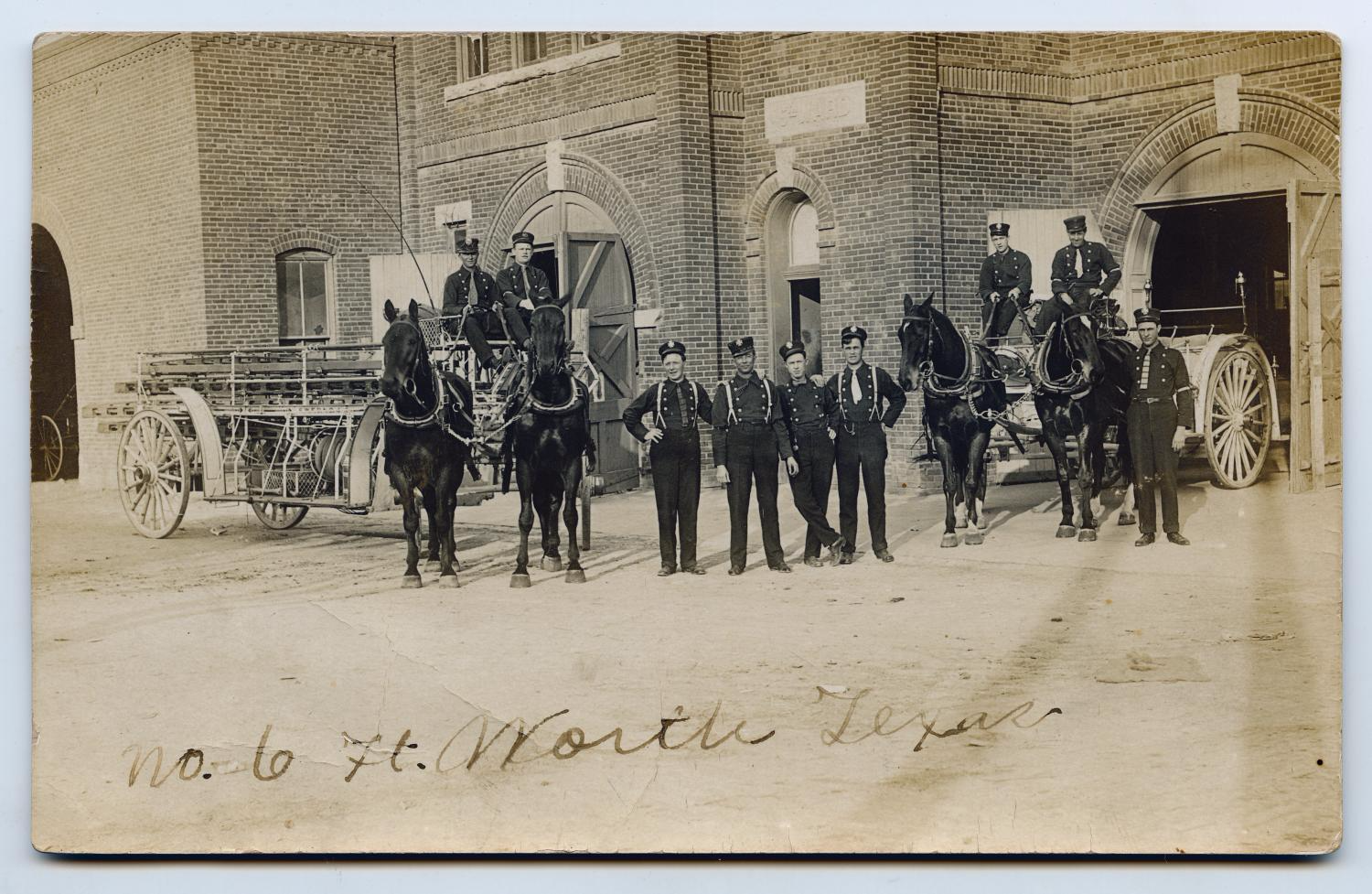
Horse-drawn fire apparatus of the Fort Worth Fire Department

=== White apparatus ===
1904 saw the beginning of the tradition of Fort Worth Fire Department apparatus being painted white. That year, Station #5 had been selected to represent Fort Worth at the annual Texas State Pump race at the State Fair of Texas in Dallas. The members of Company #5 were unable to take their regular apparatus and instead had to use a reserve pumper. The pumper was in poor shape, and with the city unwilling to provide funding, the men raised the money themselves. They took the pumper to E.E. Lennox buggy works and asked Mr. Lennox to make it the prettiest wagon he could. When the members of the company returned, they found the wagon painted white with the trim and lettering in gold. The company won the races and the $250 prize that year. Thereafter, citizens of Fort Worth began to compliment the fire department on how beautiful the wagon was. Pleased with all of the compliments, the fire chief declared that all new and refurbished equipment was to be painted white. Fort Worth's apparatus were completely white until 1981, when a blue stripe was added.

=== Great South Side Fire of 1909 ===
On April 3, 1909, the Fort Worth Fire Department responded to a fire on the city's south side. Aided by a 40 mph wind, the fire quickly grew and a general alarm was soon sounded. Two of the department's engines crashed while en route to the fire. Engine Company #8 crashed into a telephone pole and Hose Company #5 was also put out of action when one of its horses slipped and broke a leg. The fire grew so hot that the rubber hoses the department was using melted. The fire burned out of control until it came to the natural barrier created by the Texas and Pacific Railroad's locomotive roundhouse, shops, and yard. This barrier prevented the fire from spreading further north, thus sparing the downtown area. When the fire was finally put out, more than 26 square blocks and 290 structures, including the Texas and Pacific station, were destroyed.

=== 1909–1919 ===
In 1909 the city began purchasing motorized equipment for the department. The first motorized vehicle was a car at the cost of $2,140. By 1919 the department was completely motorized and all horse-drawn equipment was withdrawn from service. During these years the department hired its first Fire Marshal and the city began adopting several progressive fire codes.

=== 1920s and '30s ===
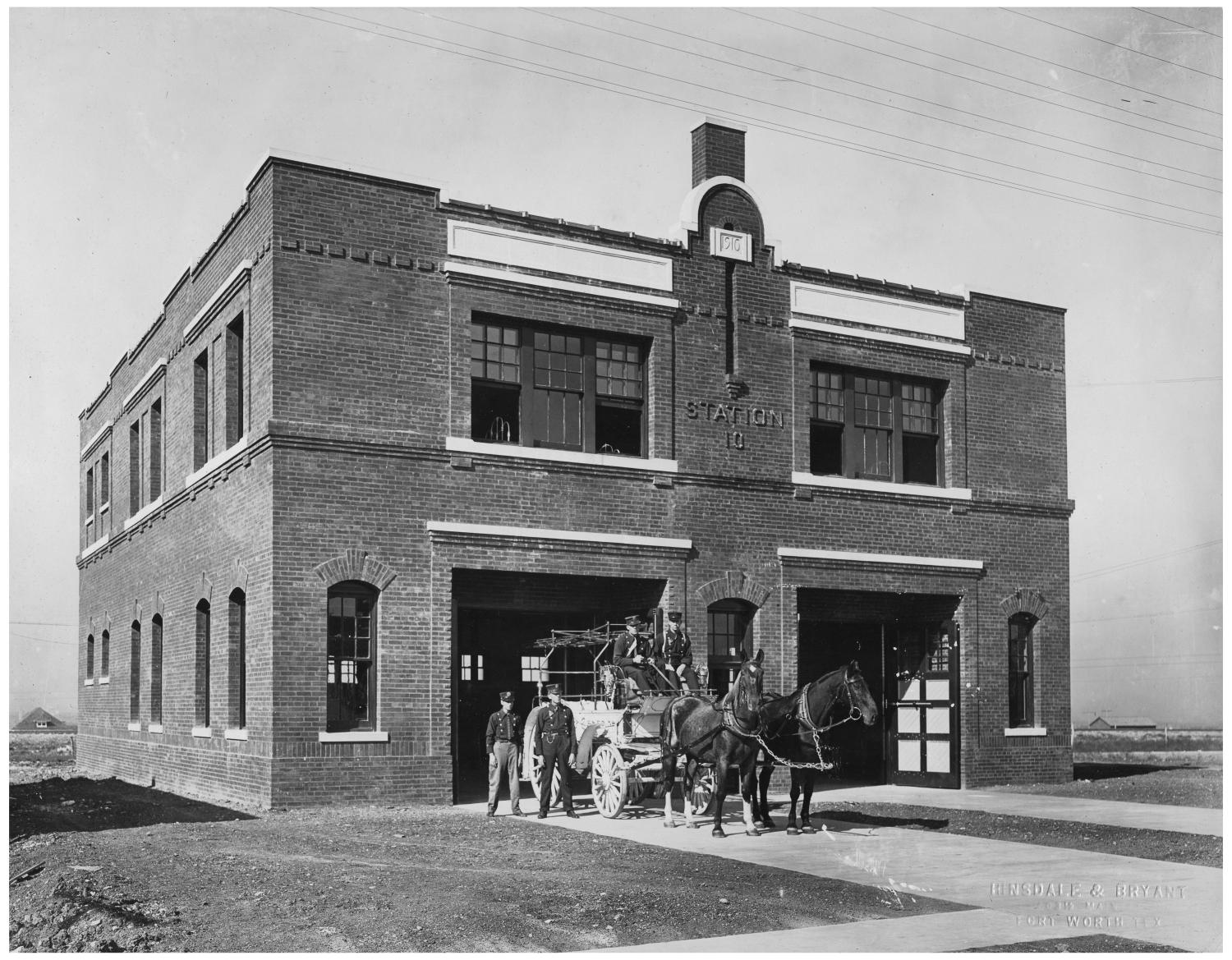
Men and Apparatus in front of Station 10 in Fort Worth circa 1910

During the 1920s and 1930s the department continued to expand along with the city. A new downtown headquarters and signal station at 1000 Cherry Street, designed by Wyatt C. Hedrick, began operation in December 1930. The department unionized in 1935. The union began pressing for a minimum wage law and in 1937 the Texas legislature passed the desired legislation. This put a strain on the already depleted city coffers, and the city was only able to pay about 75% of the minimum wage. The union sued for back pay, but the fire chief declared he was unable to back the lawsuit.

=== 1940s & '50s ===
During WWII, Fort Worth had difficulty replacing its older fire apparatus as the military had preference for all heavy equipment purchases. The city had been able to purchase some new equipment in the years before the US entered the war, but with 21 stations and the city expanding to 100 square miles, the department's resources were stretched thin. During this time, relations between the department management and the union continued to deteriorate. This came to a head in 1945 when the city manager demoted the fire chief to captain.

The post-war era saw many changes to the department, which was finally able to replace its outdated equipment. In 1947, the Texas Legislature passed a civil service act requiring police and fire departments to implement a competitive promotion system. This same law also forbade police and firefighters from going on strike.

During the 1950s the department began numerous public relations campaigns aimed at fire prevention. To this end, the Fire Safety division of the department was created in 1956. During the first six months, 415 programs taught 81,000 people about fire safety and prevention.

=== 1960s ===
1961 saw two firsts for the department. The department formed its first squad company to help with medical emergencies. In years prior, all department personnel had received training in first aid from the American Red Cross, but advances in rescue techniques and equipment led to the availability of more innovative training. The department also formed its dive team in 1961, using SCUBA techniques modeled after those used by famed French oceanographer Jacques Cousteau.

Also during the 1960s, the city spent almost $1.5 million replacing equipment and remodeling its fire stations. The biggest change was the opening of the city's Fire and Police Training center. Initially criticized, the training center proved to be a great success and was studied by cities nationwide.

=== 1970s and '80s to present ===
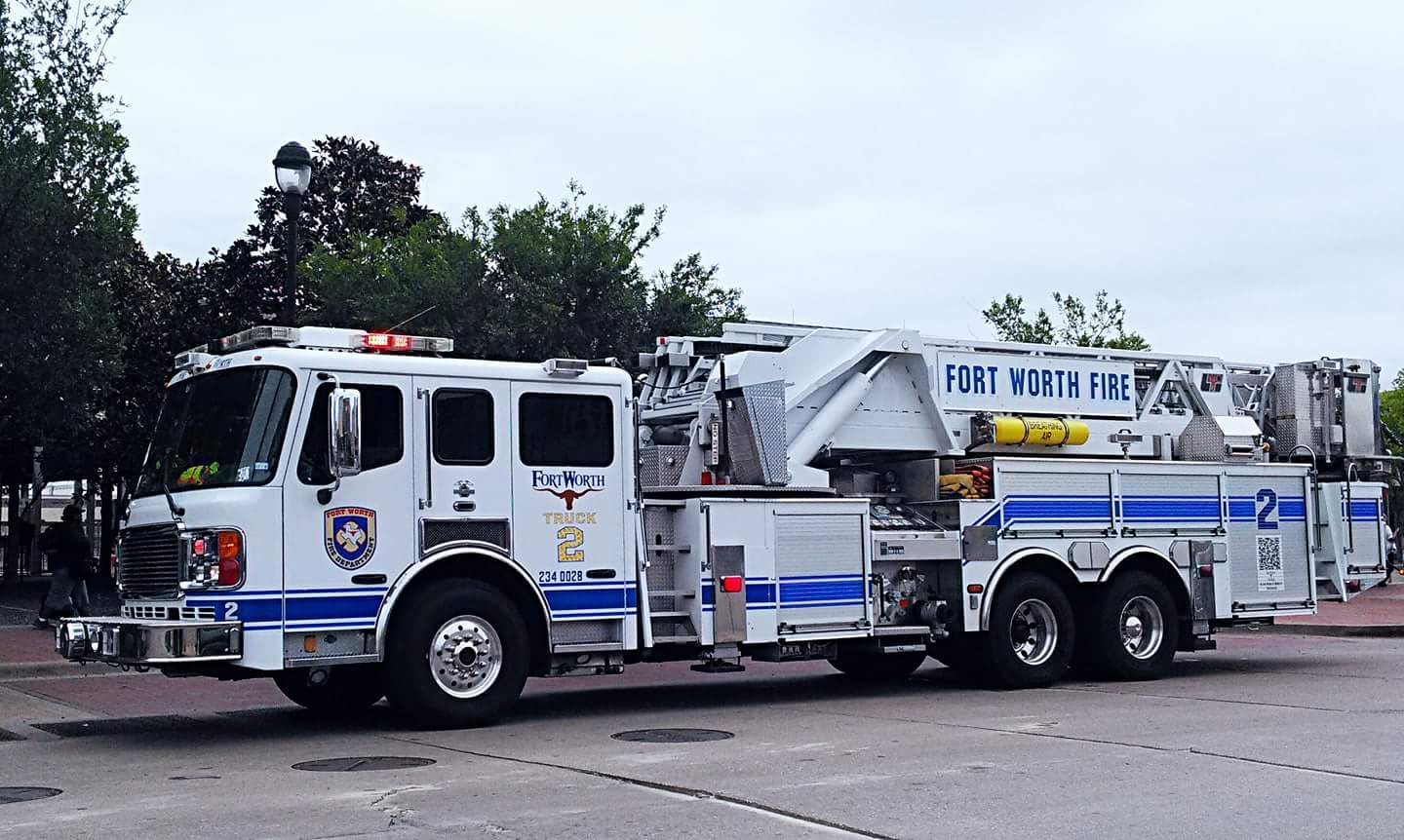
Fort Worth Fire Department's Truck 2 responding to a call

The 1970s and 1980s saw many changes to the department. The police and fire departments had been reorganized into the city's public safety department, while the fire department was also internally reorganized. A first responder program was initiated to train all firefighters as EMTs, and HAZMAT teams were formed during this time to respond to incidents where hazardous materials were involved. The department began requiring all of its members to participate in a physical fitness program. This program also mandated yearly physicals, at the department's expense.

Since the 1980s, the department has added new firehouses in the rapidly-growing area of Far North Fort Worth and replaced outdated firehouses throughout the city.

On July 1, 2025 Fort Worth Fire Department absorbed Medstar Mobile Healthcare, bringing on about 600 previous Medstar employees.
