= Timeline of Garland, Texas =

The following is a timeline of the history of the city of Garland, Texas, United States.

== 19th century ==
- 1874 – Duck Creek village founded.
- 1878 – Post office established.
- 1886 – Gulf, Colorado and Santa Fe Railway begins operating in vicinity of Duck Creek.
- 1887
  - Fire occurs; settlement relocated slightly northeast.
  - Garland News begins publication.
- 1888 – Relocated settlement named "Garland" after politician Augustus Hill Garland.
- 1890 – Population: 478.
- 1891
  - Town of Garland incorporated.
  - M. Davis Williams becomes mayor.
- 1895 – Garland Commercial Club formed.
- 1899
  - Fire.
  - William Sachse cemetery in use (approximate date).

== 20th century ==
- 1911 – Garland Independent School District established.
- 1913 – Travis College Hill area platted.
- 1920 – Population: 1,421.
- 1927 – May 9: Tornado.
- 1933 – Nicholson public library opens.
- 1941 – Plaza Theatre in business.
- 1950
  - Garland Road Drive-In cinema in business.
  - Population: 10,251.
- 1951 – City of Garland incorporated.
- 1968 – Garland Civic Theatre established.
- 1970 – Population: 81,437.
- 1972 – Richland Community College established in nearby Dallas.
- 1973
  - Garland Landmark Society active.
  - Dallas/Fort Worth Airport begins operating in vicinity of Garland.
- 1978 – Garland Symphony Orchestra formed.
- 1980 – Population: 138,857.
- 1982
  - Garland Center for the Performing Arts built.
  - Amber University active.
- 1986 – KIAB television begins broadcasting.
- 1987 - Walmart's first Hypermart USA concept store opened in this city, the first foray of Walmart into groceries.
- 1990 – Population: 180,650.
- 1997 – City website online (approximate date).
- 1999 – KAAM radio on the air.

== 21st century ==
- 2002 – Downtown Garland (DART station) opens.
- 2003
  - Hawaiian Falls Garland water park in business.
  - Pete Sessions becomes U.S. representative for Texas's newly created 32nd congressional district.
- 2005 – Firewheel Town Center (shopping mall) in business.
- 2007 – Ronald Jones becomes mayor.
- 2010 – Population: 226,876.
- 2013 – Douglas Athas becomes mayor.
- 2015
  - May 3: Curtis Culwell Center attack.
  - December 26: 2015 Garland tornado.
- 2021
  - December 26: 2021 Garland shooting

== See also ==
- Garland history
- List of mayors of Garland, Texas
- Timelines of other cities in the North Texas area of Texas: Arlington, Dallas, Denton, Fort Worth, Irving, Plano, Wichita Falls

== Bibliography ==
- "Garland". Texas State Gazetteer and Business Directory. Detroit: R.L. Polk & Co. 1890.
- "Garland". Memorial and Biographical History of Dallas County, Texas. Chicago: Lewis Publishing Company. 1892.
- Garland Local History & Genealogical Society Quarterly, OCLC 9147051 1972-
- Ory Mazar Nergal, ed. (1980), "Garland, TX", Encyclopedia of American Cities, New York: E.P. Dutton, p. 135, OL 4120668M
- Michael R. Hayslip (1991). Garland: its premiere century. Chatsworth, Calif.: Windsor Publications. ISBN 0897813774.
- Paul T. Hellmann (2006). "Texas: Garland". Historical Gazetteer of the United States. Taylor & Francis. ISBN 1-135-94859-3.
- Richard Abshire (2009). Garland: a Contemporary History. San Antonio: Historical Publishing Network. ISBN 978-1-893619-92-0.
- Paul Himmelreich (2014). Garland. Images of America. Charleston, SC: Arcadia. ISBN 978-1467132268.
