= Timeline of Plano, Texas =

The following is a timeline of the history of the city of Plano, Texas, USA.

== 19th century ==
- 1848 - Town of Fillmore founded.
- 1852 - Fillmore renamed "Plano."
- 1870 - Population reaches 155.
- 1872 - Houston and Texas Central Railway begins operating.
- 1873 - Town of Plano incorporated.
- 1883 - Telephone in use (approximate date).
- 1891 - Plano Public School established.
- 1894
  - Fire Department organized.
  - Plano Milling Company (flour mill) in business.
- 1900 - Population: 1,304.

== 20th century ==
- 1902 - Star-Courier newspaper begins publication.
- 1908 - Plano Station, Texas Electric Railway built.
- 1913 - Palace Theater in business.
- 1923 - City hall building constructed.
- 1951 - North Texas Municipal Water District established.
- 1960 - Population: 3,695.
- 1962 - City of Plano incorporated.
- 1965 - Population: 13,097.
- 1969 - Plano Drive-In cinema in business.
- 1970 - Population: 17,872.
- 1977 - John Clark Stadium (school stadium) opens.
- 1980
  - Dallas Area Rapid Transit bus begins operating.
  - Population: 72,331.
- 1981
  - Collin Creek Mall in business.
  - Plano East Senior High School established.
- 1985 - Dick Armey becomes U.S. representative for Texas's 26th congressional district.
- 1986 - Heritage Farmstead Museum opens (in 1891 farmhouse).
- 1990 - Population: 128,713.
- 1991
  - Republic of Texas Press in business (approximate date).
  - Sam Johnson becomes U.S. representative for Texas's 3rd congressional district.
- 1997 - Prestonwood Christian Academy established.
- 1999
  - City website online (approximate date).
  - Prestonwood Baptist Church (later megachurch) built.
  - Plano West Senior High School established.

== 21st century ==
- 2001 - Shops at Willow Bend in business.
- 2002 - Dallas Area Rapid Transit light rail begins operating; Downtown Plano station opens.
- 2009 - Phil Dyer becomes mayor.
- 2010 - Population: city 259,841; megaregion 19,728,244.
- 2013 - Harry LaRosiliere becomes mayor.
- 2015 - East Plano Islamic Center (EPIC Masjid) built.
- 2016 - Toyota North American headquarters built.
- 2017 - Marriott Renaissance hotel built in Legacy West.
- 2021 - A masked gunman suspected of an earlier murder in Garland is shot and killed after opening fire at the Plano Police Department headquarters, in what is believed to be an act inspired by terrorists.

== See also ==
- Plano history
- List of mayors of Plano, Texas
- Timelines of other cities in the North Texas area of Texas: Arlington, Dallas, Denton, Fort Worth, Garland, Irving, Wichita Falls

== Bibliography ==
- "Plano". Texas State Gazetteer and Business Directory. St. Louis: R.L. Polk & Co. 1884 – via Internet Archive.
- "Plano". Texas State Gazetteer and Business Directory. Detroit: R.L. Polk & Co. 1890.
- Friends of the Plano Public Library (1985). Plano, Texas: The Early Years. Wolfe City, Texas: Henington. ISBN 0965184102.
- Vicki Northcutt (1999). Plano: an Illustrated Chronicle. San Antonio, TX: Historical Publishing Network. ISBN 978-0-9654999-5-8.
- Paul T. Hellmann (2006). "Texas: Plano". Historical Gazetteer of the United States. Taylor & Francis. p. 1077. ISBN 1-135-94859-3.
- Historic Downtown Plano. Images of America. Arcadia. 2012. ISBN 9780738579023.
