= Timeline of Irving, Texas =

The following is a timeline of the history of the city of Irving, Texas, USA.

== 20th century ==
- 1903 - Irving founded by real estate developers Julius Otto Schulze and Otis Brown.
- 1904
  - Post Office relocated to Irving from nearby Kit settlement.
  - First Baptist Church of Irving founded.
  - Irving Index newspaper begins publication (approximate date).
- 1909 - Irving Independent School District established.
- 1914
  - Town of Irving incorporated.
  - Otis Brown becomes mayor.
- 1920 - Population: 357.
- 1940 - Population: 1,089.
- 1941 - Public library opens.
- 1951 - Irving Theater in business.
- 1952 - City of Irving incorporated.
- 1955 - Plymouth Park Shopping Center in business.
- 1956 - Catholic University of Dallas established in Irving.
- 1960
  - Irving Daily News Texan in publication.newspaper begins publication (approximate date).
  - Population: 45,985.
- 1964
  - "Trucking terminal" built.
  - Irving Community Hospital opens.
  - Park Plaza Drive-In cinema in business.
- 1970 - Population: 97,260.
- 1971 - Texas Stadium opens.
- 1973 - Las Colinas neighborhood created.
- 1974 - Dallas-Fort Worth Regional Airport begins operating.
- 1977 - North Lake College established.
- 1978 - Irving Heritage Society formed.
- 1981 - Irving city archives established.
- 1985 - August 2: Airplane crash occurs.
- 1990
  - Exxon Mobil Corporation headquarters relocated to Irving from New York.
  - Population: 155,037.
- 1991 - Sam Johnson becomes U.S. representative for Texas's 3rd congressional district.
- 1998 - City website online (approximate date).
- 2000 - December 24: Robbery of Oshman's Sporting Goods by the "Texas Seven" criminals

== 21st century ==
- 2003 - City centennial observed.
- 2010
  - April 11: Texas Stadium imploded.
  - Population: 216,290.
- 2011
  - Irving Convention Center at Las Colinas opens.
  - Beth Van Duyne elected mayor.
- 2012 - Dallas Area Rapid Transit rail begins operating.
- 2013 - Marc Veasey becomes U.S. representative for Texas's newly created 33rd congressional district.
- 2015 - September 14: Ahmed Mohamed clock incident.

== See also ==
- Irving history
- List of mayors of Irving, Texas
- Timelines of other cities in the North Texas area of Texas: Arlington, Dallas, Denton, Fort Worth, Garland, Plano, Wichita Falls

== Bibliography ==
- Ory Mazar Nergal, ed. (1980), "Irving, TX", Encyclopedia of American Cities, New York: E.P. Dutton, OL 4120668M
- Joseph Rice. Irving: A Texas Odyssey. Windsor Publications, Inc., 1989.
- Karen Sykes and Jeffery S. Covington. Irving: The Spirit and Dreams of Tomorrow. Atlanta: Longstreet Press, 1994.
- Paul T. Hellmann (2006). "Texas: Irving". Historical Gazetteer of the United States. Taylor & Francis. ISBN 1-135-94859-3.
- "Community Information Wiki". City of Irving. 2007-
- Roxanne Del Rio (2016). Irving. Images of America. Arcadia. ISBN 978-1-4396-5649-5.
