= Berachah Industrial Home for the Redemption of Erring Girls =

Coordinates: 32.7281°N 97.1166°W

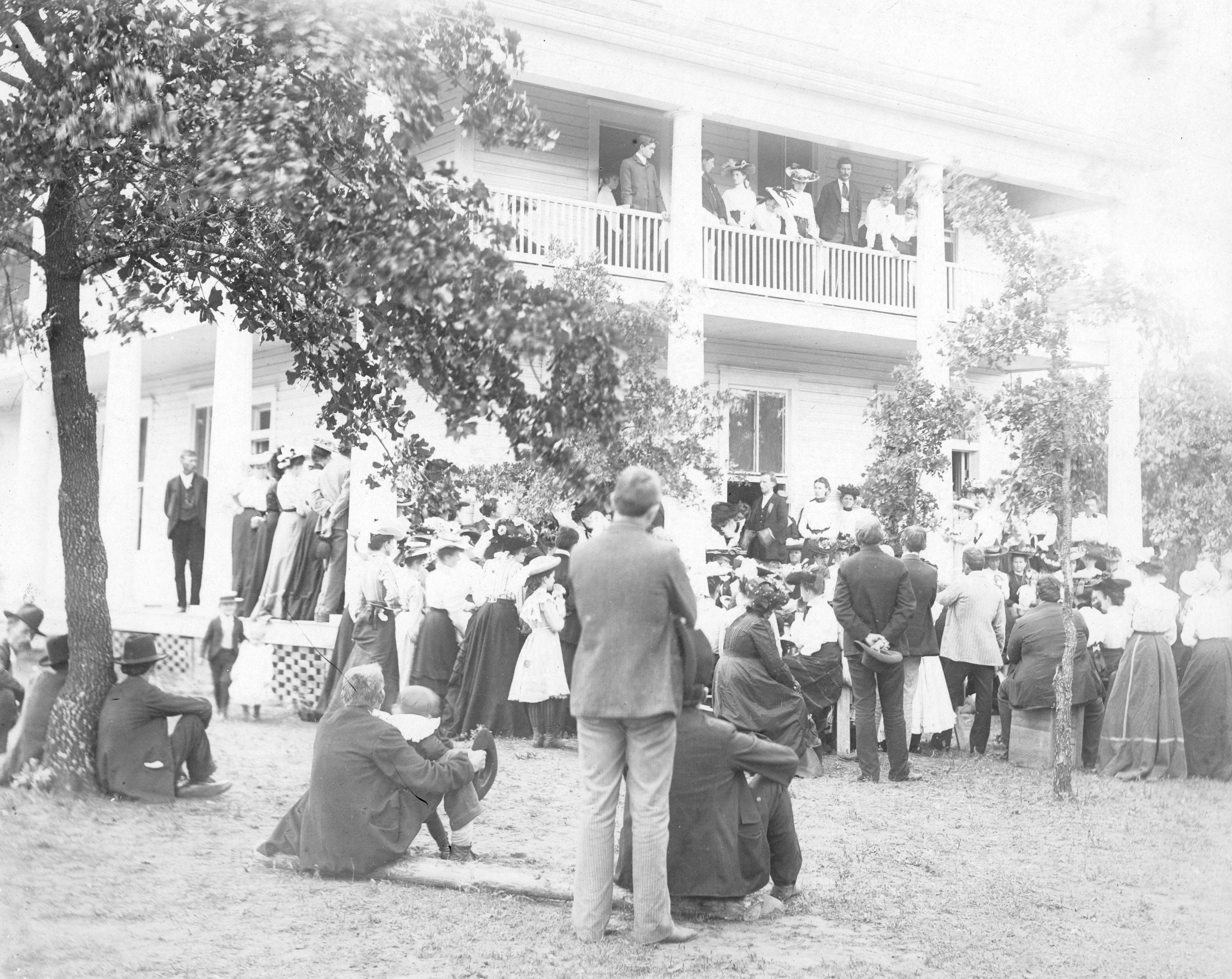
Berachah Home dedication service, May 1903

The Berachah Industrial Home for the Redemption of Erring Girls was a facility for unwed mothers in Arlington, Texas. Rev. James T. and Maggie May Upchurch opened the home on May 14, 1903, and it took in homeless, usually pregnant, women from Texas and the surrounding states. Unlike other homes for "fallen women", women at the Berachah Home were required to keep their babies; no children were placed for adoption. (see, Year: 1930; Census Place: Precinct 2, Tarrant, Texas; Page: 8B; Enumeration District: 0112; FHL microfilm: 2342132).

The home closed in 1935 but reopened as an orphanage named the Berachah Child Institute, which existed from 1936 to 1942. The University of Texas at Arlington purchased the property in 1963. On March 7, 1981, a Texas Historical Marker was installed and dedicated at the graveyard that served the Berachah Home.

== History ==
James T. Upchurch was born on October 29, 1870, in Bosqueville, Texas. While living in Waco, Upchurch joined the Methodist Church and began mission work by conducting religious services in jails and on the streets. In 1892, he married Maggie May Adams, who was born on December 5, 1873, in Jackson, Tennessee; together they pursued their religious work. After encountering a woman in the red-light district of Waco, J. T. Upchurch began to focus his work ministering to these "fallen women". In 1894, the couple together founded the Berachah Rescue Society to address this social issue. The name Berachah derives from the Bible: it is found in 2 Chronicles 20:26 ("And on the fourth day they assembled themselves in the valley of Berachah; for there they blessed the LORD: therefore the name of the same place was called, The valley of Berachah, unto this day." —KJV).

In 1899, the Upchurches relocated to the Oak Cliff neighborhood of Dallas and established a small mission. This mission moved from 612 Elm Street to 169 Main Street on October 31, 1899. J. T. Upchurch appealed to Christians in Dallas to help spread the gospel and reach out to "fallen" men and women as well as the city's street children. At this time, he also began to publish the Purity Journal. Written mostly by Upchurch himself, the journal describes the work being done by the Berachah Rescue Society.

On September 25, 1901, J. T. Upchurch met with Mr. and Mrs. J. D. Cooper of Arlington, Texas, to acquire seven acres of land. The Berachah Industrial Home for the Redemption of Erring Girls opened on that site on May 14, 1903. The home's charter stated its purpose was to provide a space for "redemption and support", as well as a place in which to educate and train "erring girls". In addition to the home, other structures erected on the property included a chapel, handkerchief factory, infirmary, print shop, and school. Also established was a cemetery that contains the remains of young mothers who died during childbirth, stillborn babies, and former residents of the home who died during the measles epidemic. Eunice Williams was the first girl from the home to be buried in the cemetery in 1904.

The Berachah Home, which operated just outside of the city limits, offered young women an opportunity to learning parenting and job skills to allow them to return to mainstream society. Funding for the home came from contributions made by local businessmen in the Dallas–Fort Worth area. By 1924, 129 women and girls were residents at the Berachah Home; their average age was 17. The home ultimately closed in 1935 due to insufficient funds. Women and girls at the home were relocated elsewhere.

The Berachah Child Institute opened on the Berachah Home grounds on Easter Sunday, 1936. The Berachah Institute was founded for the care of children from broken homes. The orphanage was operated by Frank Wiese until it closed in 1942. Rev. J. T. Upchurch died at his home in Dallas on September 12, 1950.
