= Texas Spring Palace =

Exhibition in Fort Worth, in Texas, US

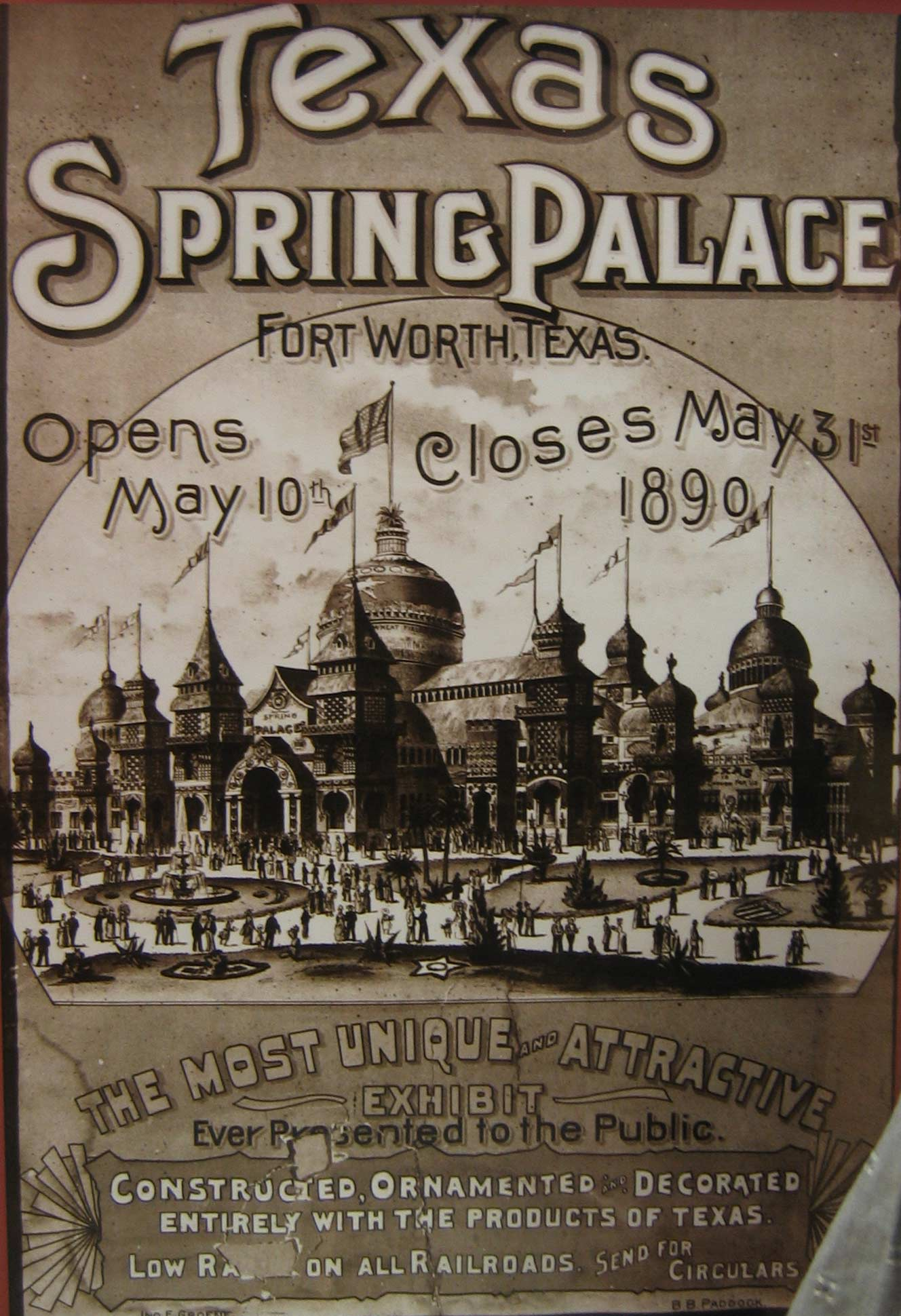
Texas Spring Palace promotional poster

The Texas Spring Palace was a regional agricultural and immigration exposition in Fort Worth designed to attract settlers and investors to Texas. Built in 1889 and lasting only two seasons, the fair's main structure was destroyed in a massive fire the following year and never rebuilt.

== Building ==
=== Development ===
The brainchild of Robert A. Cameron, an employee of the Fort Worth & Denver Railway, the Texas Spring Palace was a large-scale structure and fairground, which like various “crop palaces” and ice palaces across North America was inspired by London's Crystal Palace and Paris' Exposition Universelle. Built at the same time as the Eiffel Tower, the Texas Spring Palace was typical of a period of monumental structures, grand expositions, and spectacle.

=== Construction ===
A number of local railroad companies co-sponsored the Texas Spring Palace to boost tourism, investment, and immigration to Texas. The three-block-wide showcase building was designed by Arthur Albert Messer (1863-1934) of Fort Worth architecture firm Armstrong & Messer and featured eight towers and a massive dome. The exterior shell of the all-wood structure was built by the City of Fort Worth near the current location of the main Fort Worth post office on Lancaster Avenue, just south of downtown. The structure was built at a cost of $35,000 in just 31 days. The building's center dome was the second-largest in the nation, behind only the dome of the U.S. Capitol building; the interior featured an exhibit hall, a log cabin, a tipi, a prairie dog town, a man-made cave, and a fountain stocked with fish and waterfowl. Exhibits, such as working silkworms and Sam Houston's cane, were provided by “every willing Texas town, organization, and company,” and the interiors were decorated by women's clubs.

The building's exterior was liberally decorated with crop art made from a wide variety of Texas agricultural products, including wheat, corn, millet, cotton, grasses, mosses, cacti, coal, animal hides, seashells, cattle horns and skulls, and even a taxidermy steer. Grains of Texas corn and oats were embedded in the tar roof instead of the usual gravel. The building was expanded to double its original size for the 1890 season.

=== Fire ===
A flash fire of unknown origin erupted on the night of May 30, 1890, with over 5,000 visitors in the building attending one of the nightly balls held at the Texas Spring Palace. The wooden structure, covered in dried agricultural products that had already weathered more than a year of extreme Texas weather, was leveled in less than 15 minutes, and no part of the building could be saved. The fire and destruction of the Texas Spring Palace was front-page news nationwide. Remarkably, only one life was lost in the blaze. Al Hayne, a 40-year-old Fort Worth civil engineer originally from London, died of injuries he sustained while saving women and children from the massive fire. A monument was erected in honor of Hayne in 1893. Ada Large, a local 15-year-old, was also awarded a medal by the City of Fort Worth for her role in helping others out of the burning structure.

== Legacy ==
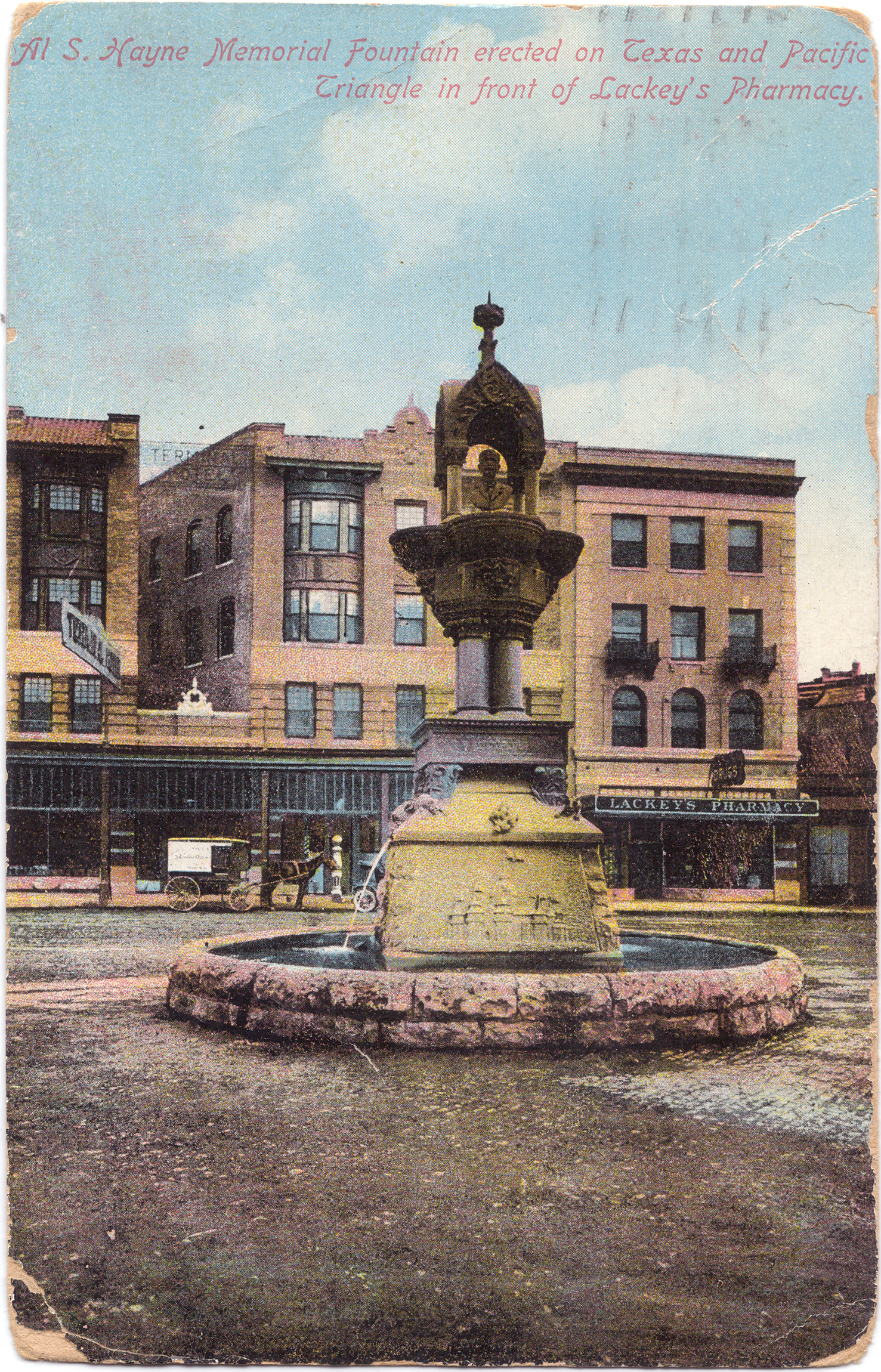
Postcard of the Al S. Hayne Memorial Fountain, 1910

Though it only lasted for two seasons, the Texas Spring Palace was ultimately a success for Fort Worth and the state of Texas; the event received national exposure in major cities, it brought businesses and investment to Fort Worth, and thousands of visitors learned about everything Texas had to offer. Visitors came from every state, plus England, Scotland, Iceland, Belgium, Canada, and Mexico. Nearly a third of all visitors came from outside of Texas. Another outcome of the Texas Spring Palace disaster was the formation of a professional fire department in 1893; Fort Worth only had a volunteer fire department until the Texas Spring Palace fire made obvious the need for full-time firefighting.

Although Fort Worth leaders fully intended to rebuild the Texas Spring Palace, plans were eventually scrapped after a decade of struggling to get the project off the ground. The Fort Worth Stock Show and the State Fair of Texas ultimately grew to include many of the popular components of the Texas Spring Palace.

Today, only a few reminders of the Texas Spring Palace remain in Fort Worth. A painting of the building by a San Antonio artist is on view in the Tarrant County Courthouse, and Al Hayne's tombstone can be seen at Oakwood Cemetery just north of downtown Fort Worth. The most well-known relic of the Texas Spring Palace is the Al Hayne Monument, which is part of the city's public art collection. Dedicated in 1893 by the Fort Worth Park League, the memorial was originally designed by local architecture firm Messer, Sanguinet, and Messer to be used as a fountain for watering horses. The construction of a new train station and related improvements required the monument to be moved and rebuilt in 1934. It now features a bronze bust of Hayne by Fort Worth artist Evaline Sellors atop a base of stone quarried in nearby Granbury, Texas. The monument is now located in a small park called the Haynes Memorial Triangle at the intersection of Lancaster Avenue and Main Street at the south end of downtown Fort Worth, close to the former site of the Texas Spring Palace.
