= Knott's Berry Farm =

Amusement park in Buena Park, California

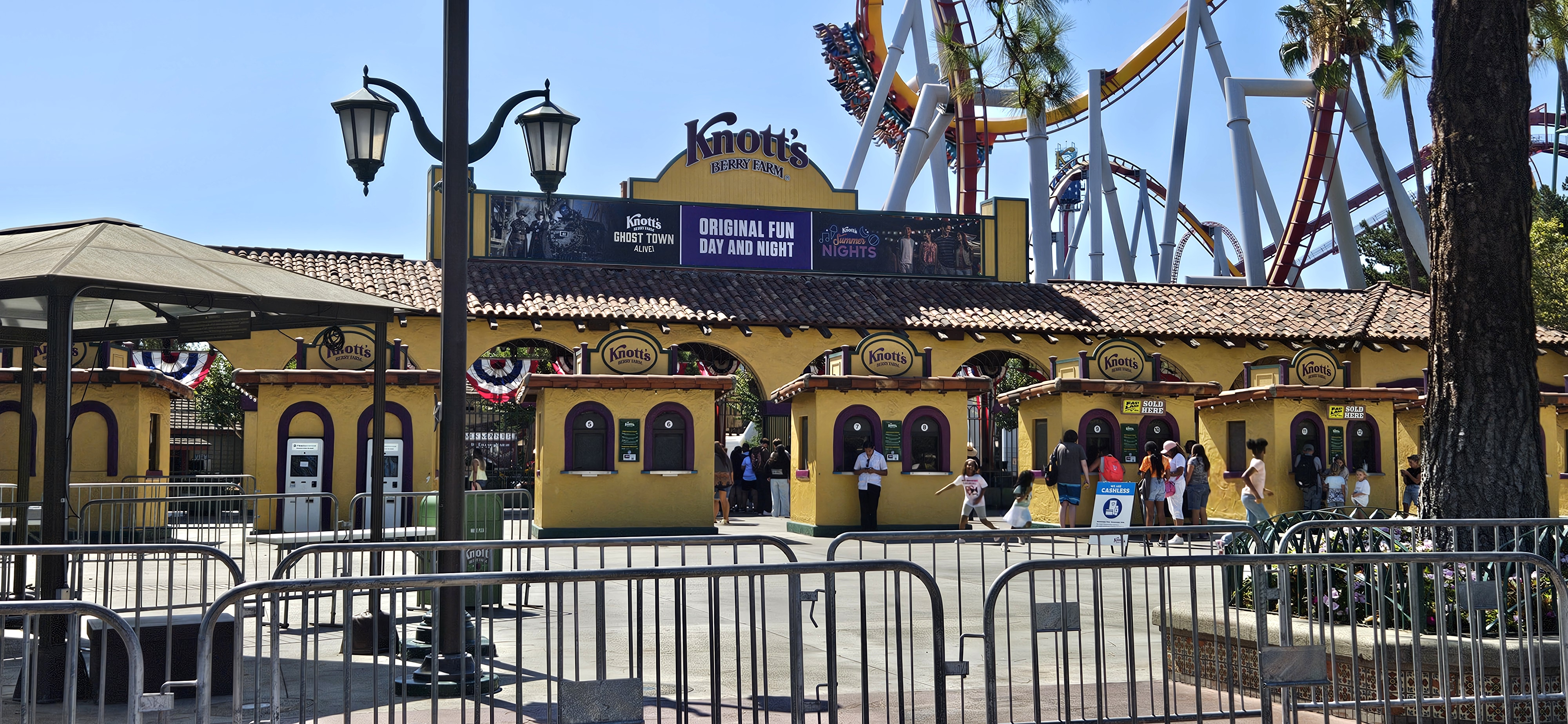
- Interactive map of Knott's Berry Farm
- Location: 8039 Beach Boulevard; Buena Park, California 90620, U.S.
- Coordinates: 33°50′39″N 118°00′01″W
- Status: Operating
- Opened: 1923 (103 years ago) (as a berry stand); July 17, 1941 (85 years ago) (as a theme park)
- Owner: Six Flags
- Park president: Raffi Kaprelyan
- Theme: The Old West and California history and culture
- Slogan: America's 1st Theme Park, California's Best Theme Park, The Friendliest Place in the West
- Operating season: Year-round
- Attendance: 4,503,000 (2024)
- Area: 57 acres (23 ha)

Attractions
- Total: 43
- Roller coasters: 10
- Water rides: 2
- Website: sixflags.com/knotts

Knott's Berry Farm is a 57-acre (23 ha) amusement park in Buena Park, California, United States. Owned and operated by Six Flags, the park officially opened as Knott's Berry Farm in 1947. Since 2016, it has averaged more than 4 million visitors per year, ranking it among the most-visited amusement parks in North America. The park features over 40 rides and attractions, including ten roller coasters.

Walter Knott and family first settled in Buena Park in December 15, 1920. The park began as a roadside berry stand along State Route 39 in California and with Jim Preston as a partner. The partnership broke up in 1927. Walter Knott built a permanent 80-foot stucco building in 1928 which houses a plant nursery, a berry market and a small tea room (later Mrs. Knott's Chicken Dinner Restaurant). A replica ghost town opened in July 17, 1941, as the site began to transition toward becoming an amusement park, later featuring a restaurant, several shops, and other attractions to accommodate a growing number of visitors. The park officially renamed as Knott's Berry Farm in August 28, 1947. The site continued its transformation into a modern amusement park over the next two decades, and an admission charge was added in 1968. In 1997, the park was sold for $300 million to Cedar Fair, which later merged with Six Flags in 2024.

== History ==
=== Origin ===
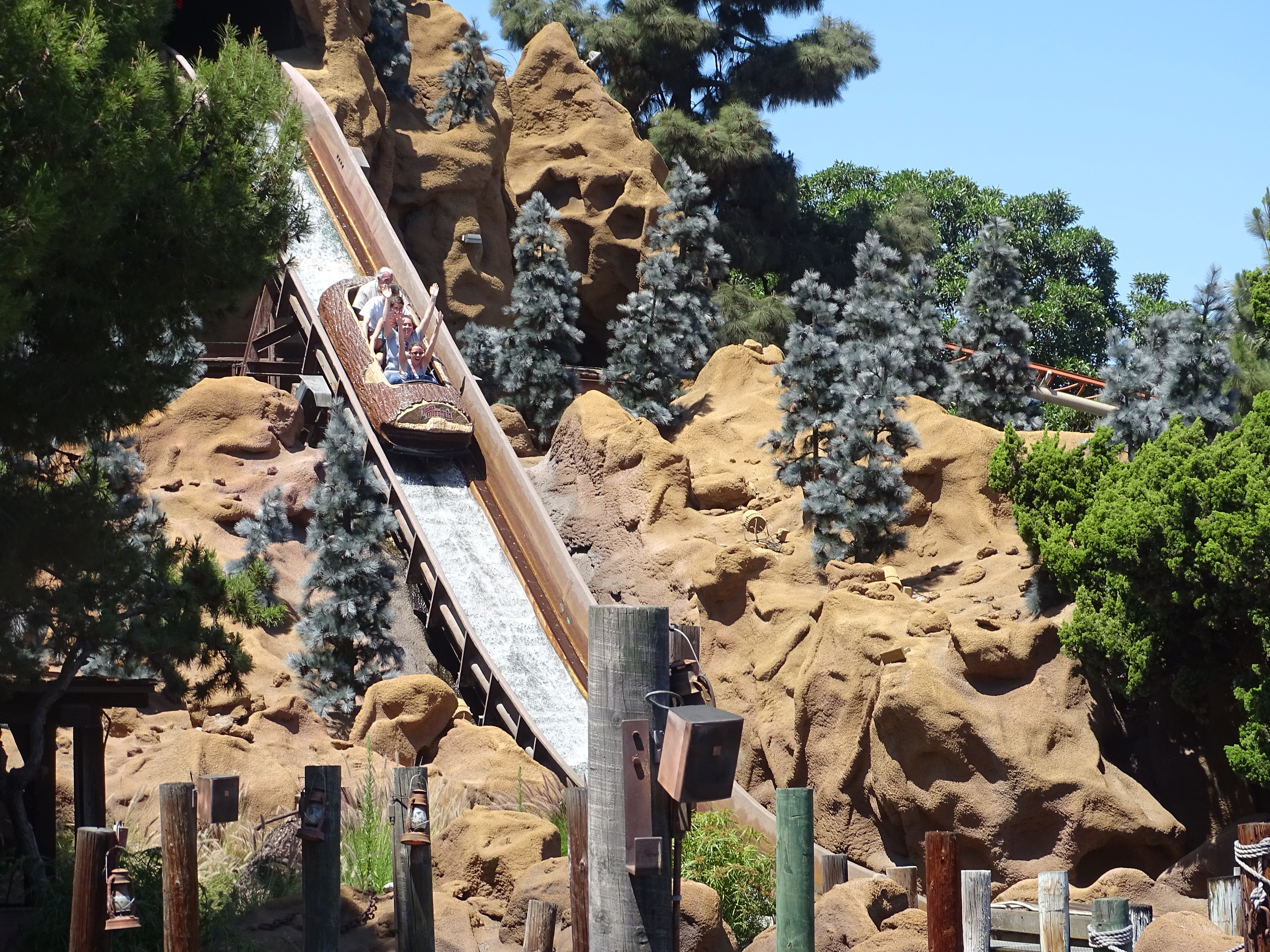
The Timber Mountain Log Ride is one of Knott's Berry Farm's most popular rides.

The park sits on the site of a former berry farm established by Walter Knott and his family who moved to Buena Park in December 15, 1920. In 1923, the Knott family and Jim Preston began selling berries, berry preserves, and pies from a roadside stand along State Route 39. In 1928, Walter Knott built a permanent 80-foot stucco building which housed a plant nursery, a berry market, a tea room and named it Knott's Berry Place. In June 13, 1934, the Knotts began selling fried chicken dinners at the 20-seat tea room, later named "Mrs. Knott's Chicken Dinner Restaurant." The dinners soon became a major tourist draw, and the Knotts built several shops and other attractions to entertain visitors waiting for a seat in the restaurant. In 1940, Walter Knott began constructing a replica Ghost Town on the property, the beginning of the present-day theme park, opening it following year. Ghost Town was Walter Knott's tribute to the pioneers, which included his own grandparents who came to California in a covered wagon from Texas in 1868 (when his mother was two years old). The idea of an amusement park picked up in the 1950s when Walter Knott opened a "summer-long county fair."

Knott's first theme park logo, composed of a prospector with a pack mule

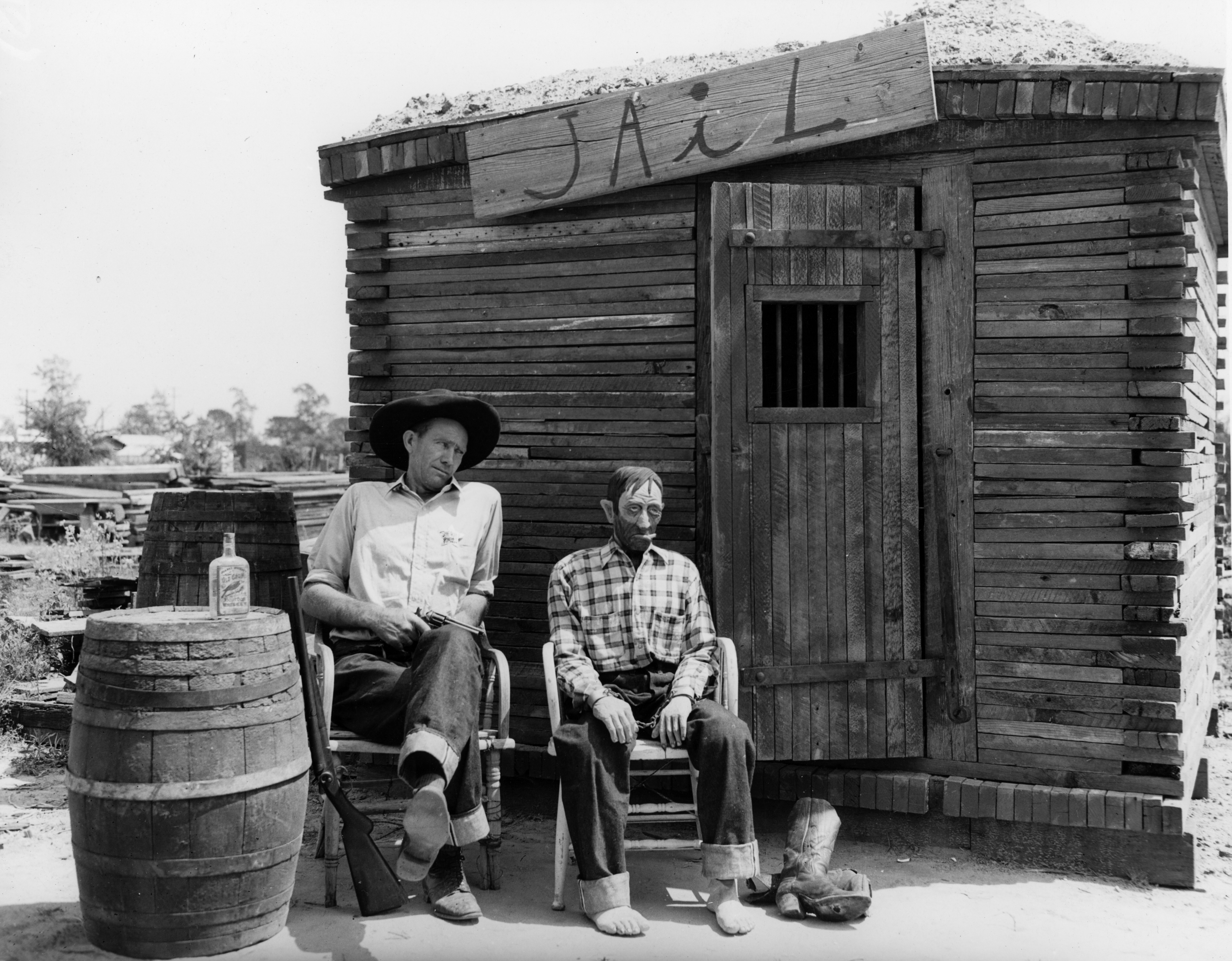
Wood carver H. S. "Andy" Anderson with Sad Eye Joe in the Ghost Town area of the park, 1941

Paul von Klieben was Walter Knott's key employee in the creation of the Ghost Town at Knott's Berry Farm and the restoration of the ghost town of Calico, California. In 1941, he joined Knott's as a staff artist, then served as art director there from 1943 to 1953. He traveled to ghost towns in the West, conducted research, and designed most of the Ghost Town section of Knott's Berry Farm. He created concept art for most of the buildings that were built there. He also drew up floor plans, oversaw the construction of buildings, and even spent some time painting concrete to look like natural rock. His Old West paintings and murals adorned the walls of many structures in the park, and a number of them still do. His art was also used extensively in Knott's newspapers, menus, brochures, catalogs and other publications.

In 1956, Walter Knott arranged with Marion Speer to bring his Western Trails Museum collection to Knott's Berry Farm. Speer had been an enthusiastic supporter of Walter Knott's efforts to create Ghost Town, and had written articles for Knott's newspaper, the Ghost Town News. In 1956, twenty years after creating his museum, Marion Speer (at age 72) donated the carefully cataloged collection of 30,000 items to Knott's in return for Knott's housing it, displaying it and naming Speer as curator. Speer continued in that position until he retired in 1969 at the age of 84.

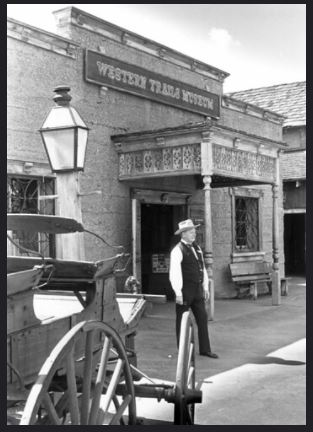
The original Western Trails Museum building at Knott's was either made of rammed-earth construction or concrete made to look like rammed-earth. This construction technique is fireproof and was used in the old mining town of Calico, California. This c. 1983 photo is courtesy of the Orange County Archives.

The museum was once housed in a building (which has since been razed) at Knott's Berry Farm between Jeffries Barn (now known as the Wilderness Dance Hall) and the schoolhouse. The Western Trails Museum at Knott's is now just south of the saloon in Ghost Town.

The park became a popular destination for conservative college students in the 1960s, especially as conservative organizations like the California Free Enterprise Association, the Libres Foundation, and the Americanism Educational League were based nearby. Its conservative appeal was so great that the final rally Barry Goldwater held prior to the 1964 Republican primary election in California, which boasted speakers including Goldwater himself and future president Ronald Reagan, was held at Knott's. According to Assistant Professor Caroline Rolland-Diamond of the Paris West University Nanterre La Défense:

it also appealed to conservative Americans, young and old, because the idealized representation of a past devoid of social and racial tensions that it offered stood in sharp contrast with the political and social upheavals affecting California since the Free Speech Movement erupted at the University of California at Berkeley in 1964.

— Caroline Rolland-Diamond, Revue française d'études américaines (2016)

In the late 1960s, a 10-foot-high (3.0 m) brick wall with barbed wire embedded into the top was constructed around "Ghost Town" and for the first time, in 1968, an admission price was required to get into that section of the park (ostensibly to keep out the "hippies" and local long-haired youth from freely "hanging out" in the park that were, on occasion, causing problems and degrading the Knott's "family" image). The entrance price originally being set at $1 for adults and 25¢ for children. Previous to this, entry was free and the cost was based on purchasing a ticket for each ride, using the A-E ticketing system similar to that of Disneyland. The Calico Log Ride (the original name of the Timber Mountain Log Ride) opened in 1969. Also during this period, an attempt to create a monorail system between Knott's and Disneyland was reportedly in the works for many years, however, project construction never began due to costs and legal issues obtaining needed property and gaining necessary right-of-way access.

When Cordelia Knott died on April 12, 1974, Walter turned his attention toward political causes. The Roaring Twenties rethemed Gypsy Camp in the 1970s with the addition of a nostalgic traditional amusement area, Wheeler Dealer Bumper Cars, and Knott's Bear-y Tales. A northward expansion featured a new area themed around a 1920s-era airfield featuring the Cloud 9 Dance Hall, Sky Cabin/Sky Jump and Motorcycle Chase steeplechase roller coaster, whose elevated track ran above the electric guided rail Gasoline Alley car ride.

The Sky Tower with the illuminated "K" in logo script at the top was built to support two attractions, the Sky Jump, operated from 1976 to 1999, and the Sky Cabin. The Sky Jump boarded one or two standing riders anticipating the thrill of the drop into baskets beneath a faux parachute canopy. From the top, twelve arms supported the vertical cable tracks of wire rope which lifted the baskets. The Sky Cabin ringed the support pole with a single floor of seats that are enclosed behind windows. Its ring revolves slowly as it rises to the top and back offering a pleasantly changing vista. It is very sensitive to weather and passenger motion, such as walking, which is prohibited during the trip. The attraction closed when winds exceeded 25 mph. When built, the tower was the tallest structure in Orange County (a distinction briefly held by WindSeeker before its relocation to Worlds of Fun in 2012.)

Motorcycle Chase, a modernized steeplechase rollercoaster built in 1976 by Arrow Development, featured single motorbike-themed vehicles racing side-by-side, each on one of four parallel tracks, launched together. One or two riders straddled each "Indian motorcycle" attraction vehicle. The tubular steel monorail track closely followed dips and bumps in "the road" and tilted to lean riders about the curves. Gasoline Alley, an electric steel-guide rail car ride below, was built together and intimately intertwined, which enhanced ride-to-ride interaction thrill value. Rider safety concerns of the high center of gravity coupled with the method of rider restraints caused it to be rethemed Wacky Soap Box Racers with vehicles themed to look like soap box racers, each seating two riders, strapped in low (nearly straddling the track), surrounded by the close-fitting car sides, and the dips and bumps of the track were straightened flat in 1980. Motorcycle Chase/Wacky Soap Box Racers was removed in 1996 for a dueling loop coaster Windjammer Surf Racers, and now Xcelerator, a vertical launch coaster, takes its place.

On December 3, 1981, Walter Knott died, survived by his children who would continue to operate Knott's as a family business for sixteen years.

In the 1980s, Knott's built the Calico Barn Dance featured Bobbi & Clyde as the house band. It was during the height of the "Urban Cowboy" era. The "Calico Barn Dance" was featured in Knott's TV commercials.

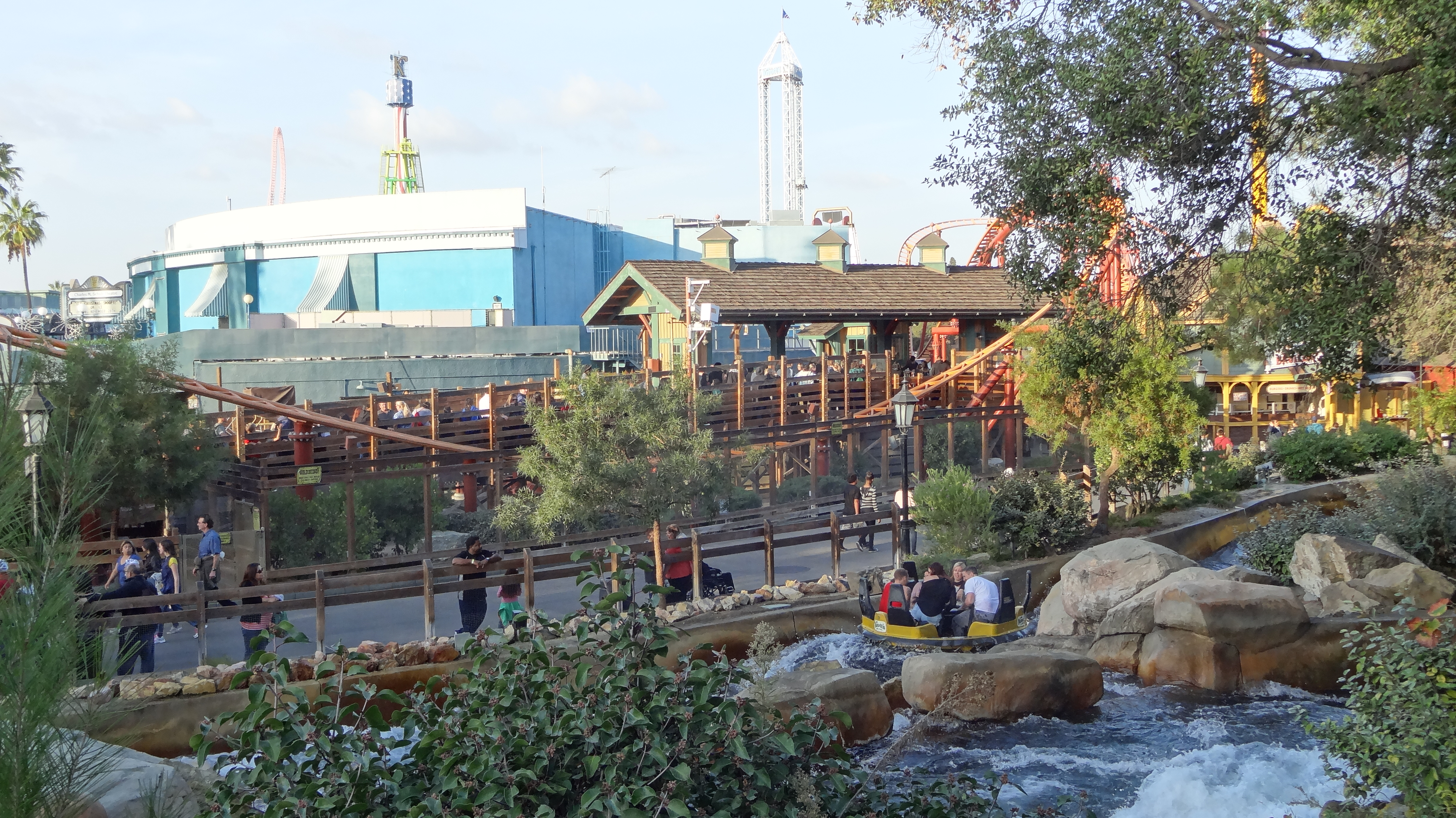
Bigfoot Rapids (now Calico River Rapids) was located in the Wild Water Wilderness section of the park.

During the 1980s, Knott's met the competition in Southern California theme parks by theming a new land and building two massive attractions: Kingdom of the Dinosaurs, a primeval retheme of Knott's Bear-y Tales), in 1987 and Bigfoot Rapids in 1988, a whitewater river rafting ride as the centerpiece of the new themed area Wild Water Wilderness.

The Boomerang roller coaster replaced Corkscrew in 1990 with a lift shuttle train passing to and fro through a cobra roll and a vertical loop for six inversions each trip.

The Mystery Lodge (1994), inspired by General Motors "Spirit Lodge" pavilion, was a live show augmented with Pepper's ghost and other special effects, which was among the most popular exhibits at Expo 86 in Vancouver, British Columbia, Canada, which was produced by Bob Rogers of BRC Imagination Arts and created with the assistance of the Kwagulth Native reserve in the village of Alert Bay, British Columbia. Mystery Lodge recreates a quiet summer night in Alert Bay, then guests "move inside" the longhouse and listen to the storyteller weave a tale of the importance of family from the smoke of the bonfire.

The Jaguar! was opened on June 17, 1995, to add another roller coaster to the mix of Fiesta Village alongside Montezooma's Revenge.

=== New owners ===
In the 1990s, after Walter and Cordelia died, their children decided to sell off their businesses.

In 1995, the Knott family sold the food specialty business to ConAgra Inc, which later resold the brand to The J.M. Smucker Company in 2008. In 2024, Smuckers discontinued sale of the Knott's Berry Farm jams in grocery stores.

On December 29, 1997, the Knott family sold the amusement park operations to Cedar Fair. Initially, the Knotts were given an opportunity to sell the park to The Walt Disney Company. The park would have been amalgamated into the Disneyland Resort and converted into Disney's America, which had previously failed to be built near Washington, D.C. However, the Knott family refused to sell the park to Disney out of concern that most of what Walter Knott had built would be eliminated.

In the late 1990s, Knotts also acquired the Buena Park Hotel, located at the northwest corner of Grand and Crescent avenues. It was then brought up to Radisson standards and branded as the Radisson Resort Hotel. In 2004, the park renamed the Radisson Resort Hotel the Knott's Berry Farm Resort Hotel.

=== Post-Cedar Fair acquisition ===
View of Silver Bullet from Sky Cabin

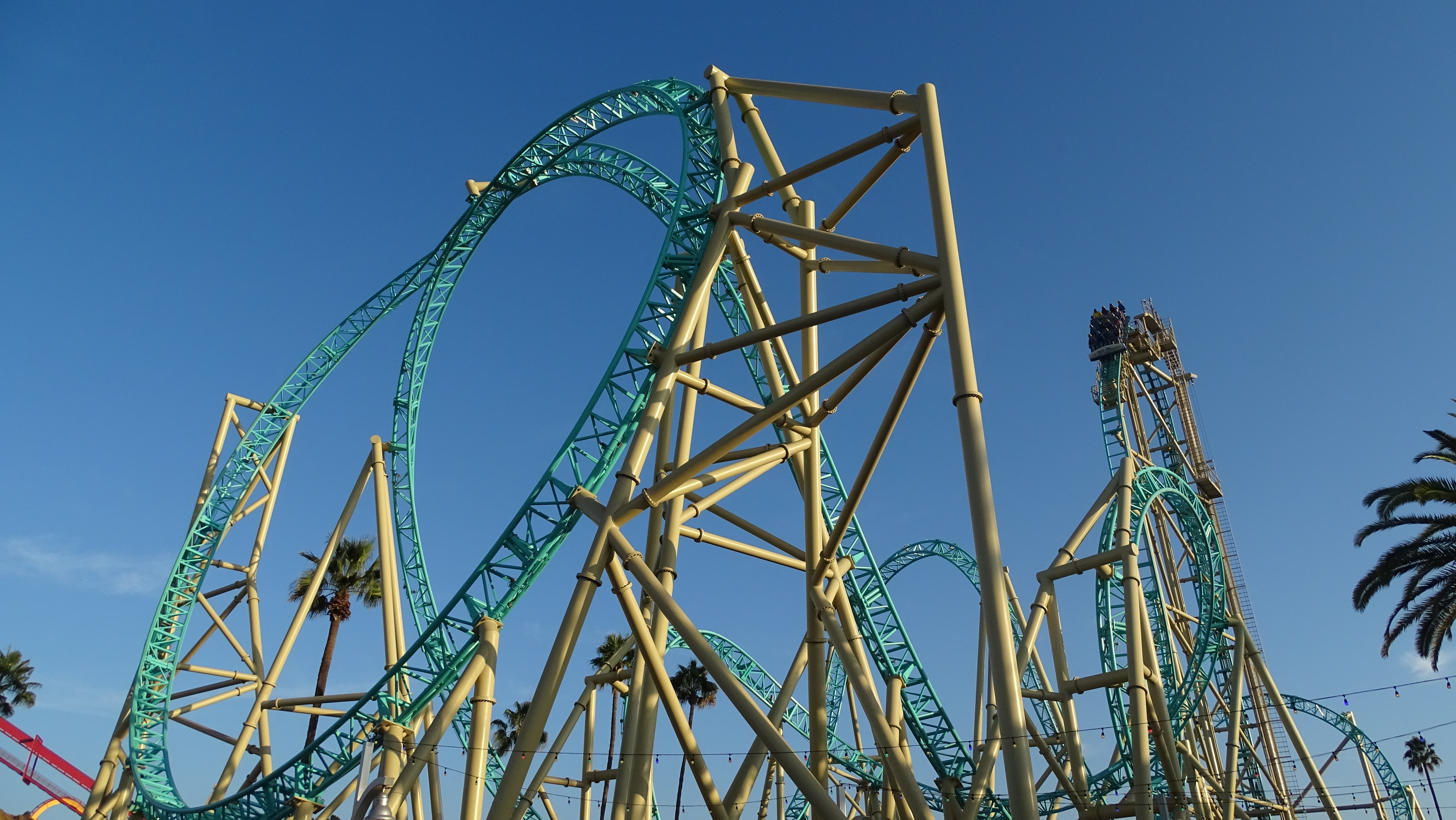
Hangtime debuted as the park's latest major roller coaster since Silver Bullet on May 16, 2018.

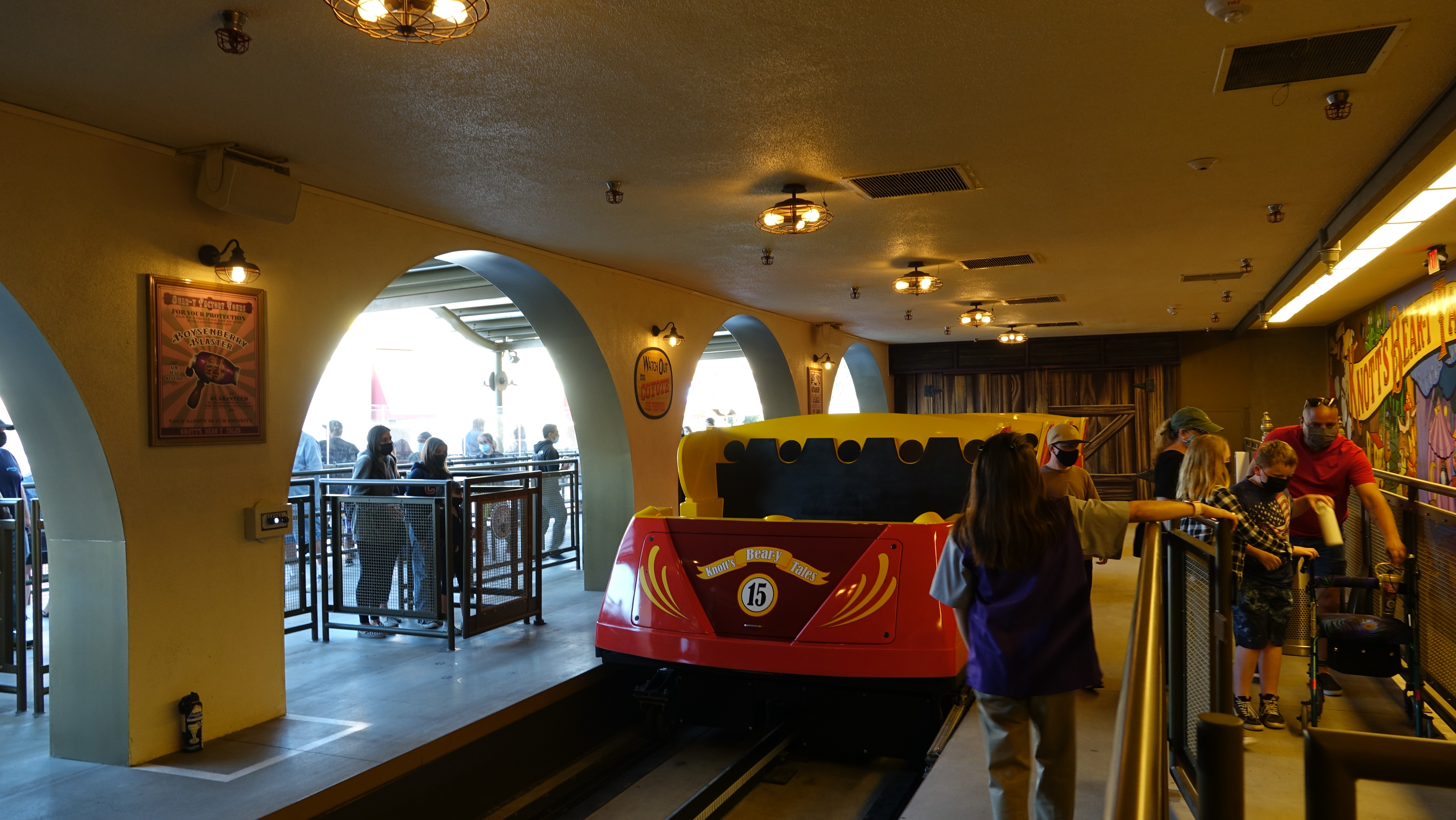
Knott's Bear-y Tales: Return to the Fair opened to season passholders on May 6, 2021.

Since being acquired by Cedar Fair, the park has seen an aggressive shift towards thrill rides, with the construction of several large roller coasters and the addition of a record-breaking Shoot-the-Chutes ride named Perilous Plunge. Perilous Plunge had the record of being the tallest and steepest water ride in the world until September 2012 when it was closed and removed. In 2013, Knott's Berry Farm announced that one of the most popular rides at the park, the Timber Mountain Log Ride, would be closed for a significant five-month refurbishment, led by Garner Holt Productions, Inc.

On May 25, 2013, Knott's Berry Farm added three new family rides on the site of the former Perilous Plunge, including a wild mouse called Coast Rider, a scrambler flat ride called Pacific Scrambler, and Surfside Gliders. All three were constructed in the Boardwalk section of the park. An old bridge that connected the exit of Coast Rider and the Boardwalk became the entrance to Surfside Gliders and Pacific Scrambler. Following the 2013 season, Knott's Berry Farm removed Windseeker and moved it to Worlds of Fun, where it reopened in 2014. For the 2014 season, the historical Calico Mine Ride underwent a major refurbishment completed in six months.

During the fall of 2019, Knott's Berry Farm announced the return of Knott's Bear-y Tales as an interactive 4D dark ride as part of the park's 100th anniversary in 2020 with the name Knott's Bear-y Tales: Return to the Fair. However, the park was indefinitely shut down due to the COVID-19 pandemic at the end of its operating day on March 13, 2020. Knott's Bear-y Tales and other planned changes to the park were postponed to 2021. In June 2020, Knott's Marketplace reopened with health guidelines in place. The following month, the park introduced Taste of Calico, an outdoor food festival on weekends located in the Ghost Town section of the park. The event evolved over the season, becoming Taste of Knott's when it expanded into Fiesta Village and the Boardwalk, Taste of Fall-o-ween during the fall season, and Taste of Merry Farm for the Christmas holiday season which was canceled in December 2020 due to the regional stay at home order issued by California Governor Gavin Newsom. Amusement Today recognized the Taste Of events in its annual Golden Ticket Awards, awarding the park under the category "Industry Leader: Amusement/Theme Park" for its innovative approach.

Knott's Berry Farm returned to normal operation on May 6, 2021, including the debut of the delayed Knott's Bear-y Tales attraction originally planned for 2020. On July 1, 2024, Cedar Fair merged with Six Flags, and the combined Six Flags Entertainment Corporation took over Knott's Berry Farm, making them part of the same company as longtime rival Six Flags Magic Mountain.

=== Timeline ===
Park timeline

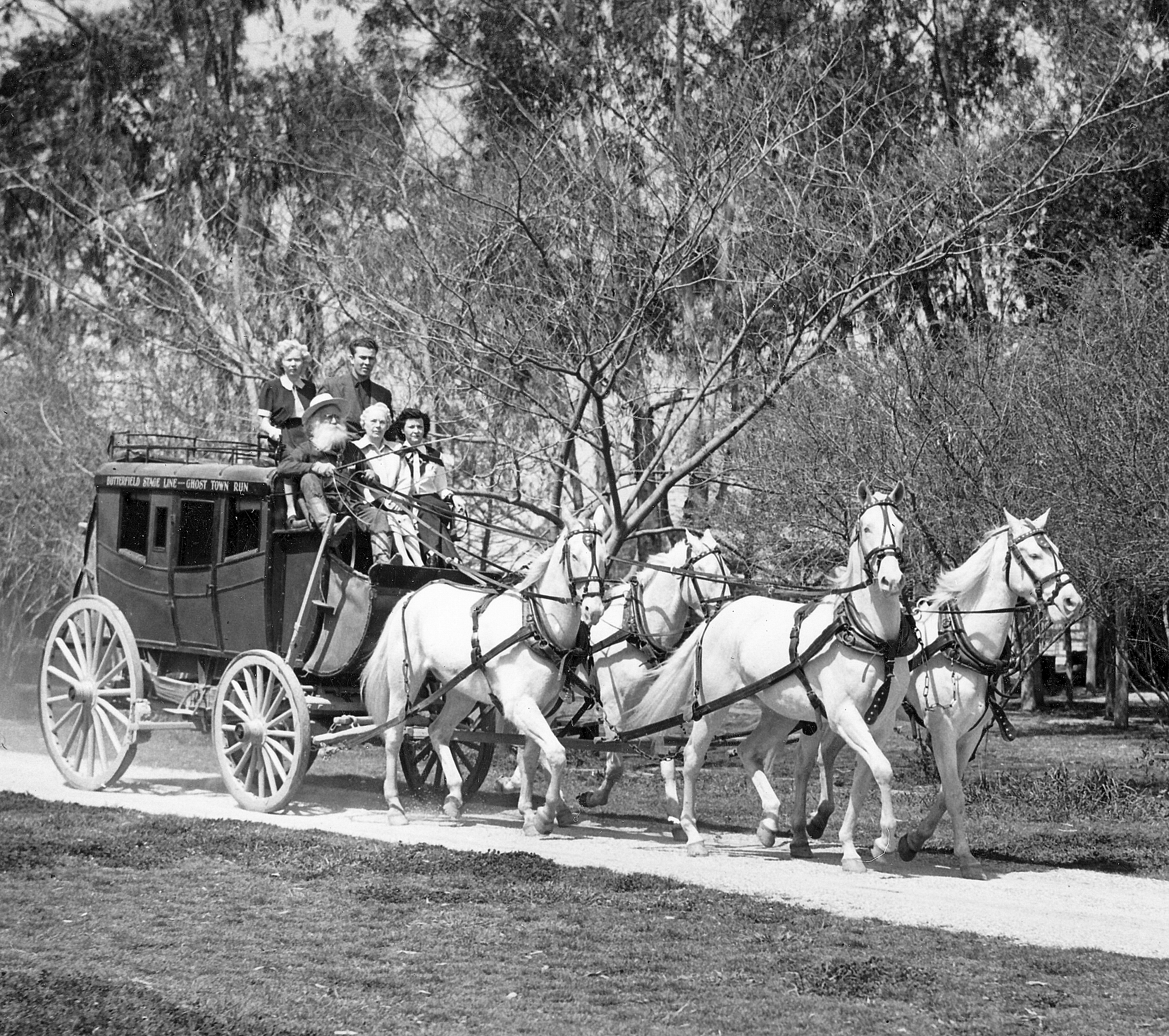
Stagecoach circa 1950, added as the first ride in 1949

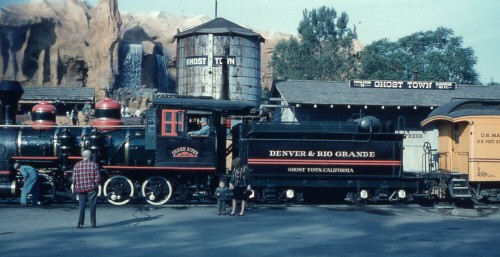
Knotts Berry Farm Denver & Rio Grand steam locomotive, added as Ghost Town & Calico Railroad in 1952

- 1920: Ten acres of berry farmland leased by Walter and Cordelia Knott
- 1927: Ten leased acres of berry farm purchased, named Knott's Berry Place
- 1929: Ten more acres are purchased
- 1932: Rudolf Boysen gives Walter his last six crossbreed berry plants, as yet unnamed
- 1934: Cordelia and her children serve the first chicken dinner to customers in their tearoom.
- 1936: Restaurant expanded to seat 70.
- 1939: Restaurant expanded to seat 600; Redwood Stump by the Information Room; Eucalyptus (variety: Viminilus) trees planted from gallon cans in what became Ghost Town the next year.
- 1940: Ghost Town buildings (such as the Jail, Goldie's Joint, Chinese laundry, Assay Office, Sheriff's Office, Barber Shop, Blacksmith Shop (Bill Shirley was the first blacksmith), Drug Store, Silver Dollar Saloon, and windmill) erected on what is now Main Street; Island created that became the Indian Village in 1952; the Volcano was built in about 1940
- 1941: 100 more acres of land are added, totals 120.
- 1941: Little Chapel by the Lake (aka the Adobe Chapel) built with Paul von Klieben's "The Transfiguration of Christ" exhibit (the farm's first attraction); Print Shop; "Old Betsey" borax engine brought from the desert just beyond Trona, California.
- 1942: Covered Wagon Show opens in the Gold Trails Hotel; Post Office built (It became a working post office in 1952); Well Fargo Office
- 1942: Restaurant is turning out 10,000 dinners a week.
- 1944: Bottle House, General Store; Arastra built in about 1944
- 1945: Bottle House (?) and Music Hall (designed by Paul von Klieben) completed. The Music Hall displayed the Knotts' collection of antique music boxes and the painting "Night Watch" by Charles Christian Nahl.
- 1946: Steakhouse; Gun Shop; Fandango Hall
- 1947: Name change from Knott's Berry Place to Knott's Berry Farm.
- 1947: Concrete bench figures Handsome Brady and Whiskey Jim (aka Whiskey Bill), the first of several sculpted by Claude Bell.
- 1947: Gold Mine, Jersey Lilly Saloon (Judge Roy Bean's)
- 1949: Bill Higdon's Covered Wagon Ride, and later Stagecoaches; Wagon Camp built; Log Cabin (by the Gold Mine) built
- 1950: Horse Arena built for the Mark Smith Horse Show
- 1951: Calico Saloon; Paul von Klieben painting "Saturday Night in Old Calico, 1888" (20 ft. x 16 ft.) is installed behind the bar (It now hangs in the Pitchur Gallery).
- 1951: Claude Bell initiates the Portraits in Pastel concession and runs it until 1986 (now operated by Kaman's Art Shoppes). Bell and his son build the Portraits in Pastel building (now used as the Geode Shop), and fireplace with relief of Mark Twain sculpted on it. The loft upstairs includes a large drafting table and access to the rooftop patio.
- 1952: Ghost Town & Calico Railroad; Mrs. Murphy's Boarding House (this building was originally the first post office in Downey)
- 1952: Schoolhouse brought in from Beloit, Kansas. About this time more buildings (designed by Paul von Klieben) are constructed on School Road, such as the Grist Mill, Barrel House, Box House and Boot Hill.
- 1953: Boot Hill; Box House (Knife Maker's Shop in front of the Barrel House); Doc Walker's Four-Room Log Cabin (brought in from the Ozarks) on School Road; Weaver's and Candlemaker's Shops (brought in from a neighboring farm)
- 1954: Haunted Shack; Bird Cage Theater; Miners' Bank; Seal Pool; Haunted House; Clock in Rose Garden; Concrete Bench figures depicting Calico Saloon performers Cecelia Peterson and Marilyn Schuler sculpted by Claude Bell; Indian Statues sculpted by Ross Yost (Claude Bell's assistant) on the hills behind Boot Hill depicting the figures in the "Night Watch" painting. The "Night Watch" painting by Charles Christian Nahl was later donated by the Knott Family to the Orange County Museum of Art.
- 1955: Dentzel Carousel (which was Wendell "Bud" Hurlbut's first concession at Knott's; Merry-Go-Round; Auto Ride (later the Tijuana Taxi); Hunter's Paradise Shootin' Gallery; Model 'T' Children's Ride; Cable Cars; Evan Middleton's Model Train Shop; First Baptist Church in Downey moved to Knott's and became the Church of Reflections; Sock-Maker's Shop; Jeffries Barn brought in; Old MacDonald's Barnyard
- 1956: Western Trails Museum; Models of California missions constructed by Leon de Volo
- 1958: Mott's Miniatures

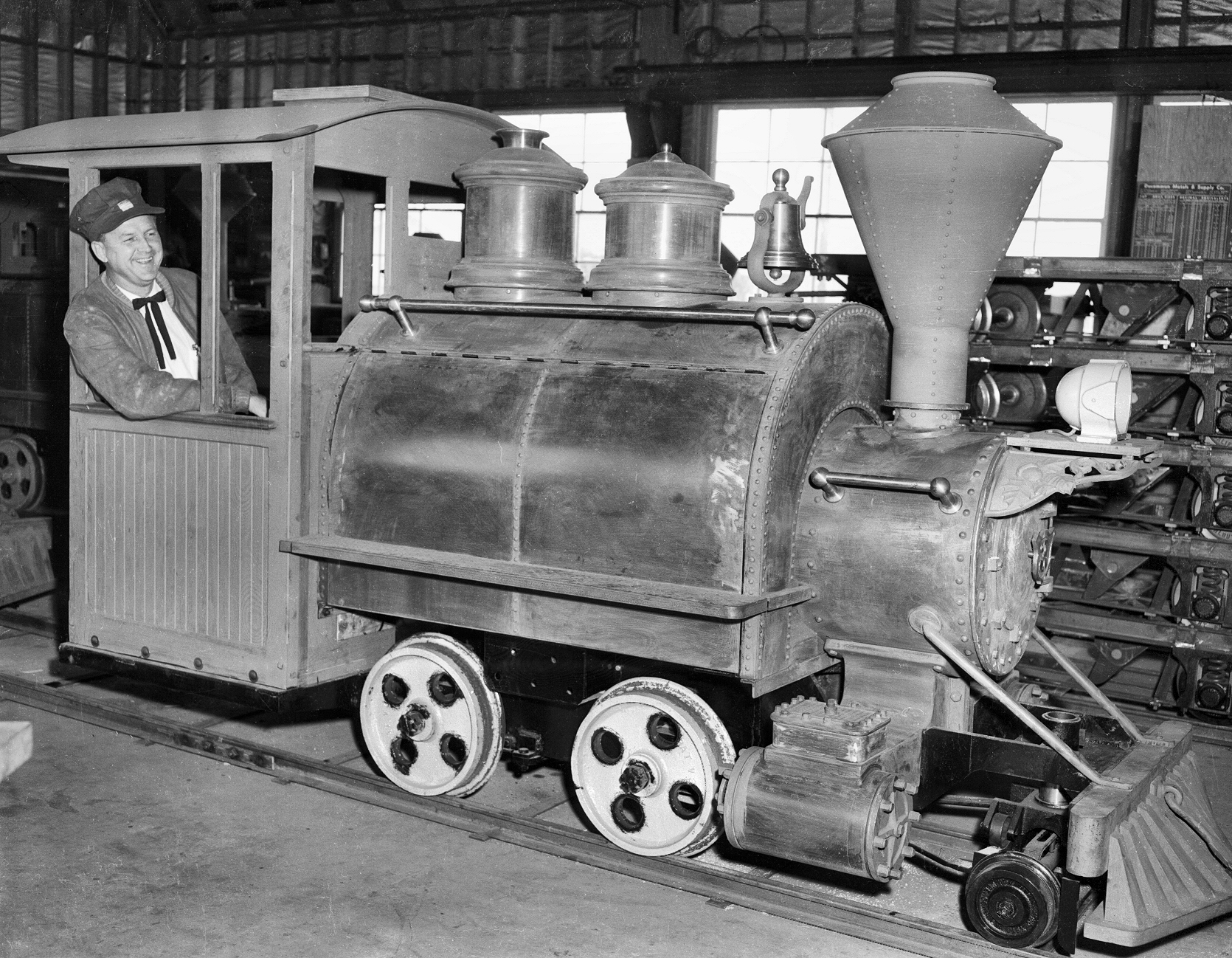
Bud Hurlbut in Calico Mine Ride engine, circa 1960

- 1959: "Bud" Hurlbut miniature train ride on the east side of Beach Blvd.
- 1960: Calico Mine Ride; Shootin' Gallery (aka Hunter's Paradise)
- 1963: "Cordelia K" christened
- 1965: "Bud" Hurlbut creates replica of the Liberty Bell for display in Independence Hall
- 1966: Independence Hall
- 1967: Bust of Walter Knott sculpted by Claude Bell (on display in Independence Hall)
- 1968: Fence surrounds the park, and admission is charged.
- 1969: Timber Mountain Log Ride; Fiesta Village themed area; Tijuana Taxi (re-themed from Auto Ride); Mexican Whip; Fiesta Wheel; Happy Sombrero.
- 1970: Claude Bell sculpts the Minuteman statue displayed near Independence Hall (at Crescent St. and Beach Blvd.)
- 1971: John Wayne Theater (later the Good Time Theater, then the Charles M. Schulz Theater); Gypsy Camp
- 1973: Inaugural Knott's Scary Farm Halloween event
- 1974: Wild West Stunt Show replaces Wagon Camp shows.
- 1975: Corkscrew; Knott's Bear-y Tales; Roaring 20s
- 1976: Motorcycle Chase; Sky Jump; Sky Cabin; Propeller Spin; Loop Trainer Flying Machine; Whirlpool; Gasoline Alley; Whirlwind.
- 197?: Knotts Berry Farm Hotel opened.
- 1978: Montezooma's Revenge; Old MacDonald's Farm removed; Cable Cars removed
- 1980: Dragon Swing; Wacky Soap Box Racers
- 1983: Barn Dance featured Bobbi & Clyde Country Western Dancing; Camp Snoopy themed area built, forcing the removal of Knott's Lagoon and its attractions around a lake which had been built north of Independence Hall, so that a parking area could be relocated.
- 1984: Studio K debuts. The most successful teen dance facility in the nation. Opened with a Dick Clark Special, "Rock Rolls On".
- 1986: Knott's Pacific Pavilion; Knott's Bear-y Tales removed; Tijuana Taxi removed; Fiesta Wheel removed; Mexican Whip removed.
- 1987: Kingdom of the Dinosaurs; Tampico Tumbler; Gran Slammer; Slingshot;; Bear-y Tales Funhouse; Happy Sombrero renamed Mexican Hat Dance.
- 1988: Bigfoot Rapids
- 1989: XK-1; Greased Lightning moved into an enclosed building and renamed Whirlwind. Corkscrew removed/refurbished and moved to Silverwood Theme Park in Idaho; Propeller Spin removed; Loop Trainer Flying Machine removed.
- 1990: Boomerang built on the former site of Corkscrew.
- 1991: Studio K closed.
- 1992: Indian Trails-themed area; Mott's Miniatures closes.
- 1994: Mystery Lodge.
- 1995: Jaguar!
- 1996: The Boardwalk-themed area (a retheme of Roaring 20's); HammerHead; Greased Lightning renamed HeadAche; Whirlpool renamed Headspin; Wacky Soap Box Racers with Gasoline Alley removed.
- 1997: Windjammer Surf Racers; Cedar Fair acquires the park; Bear-y Tales Funhouse removed.

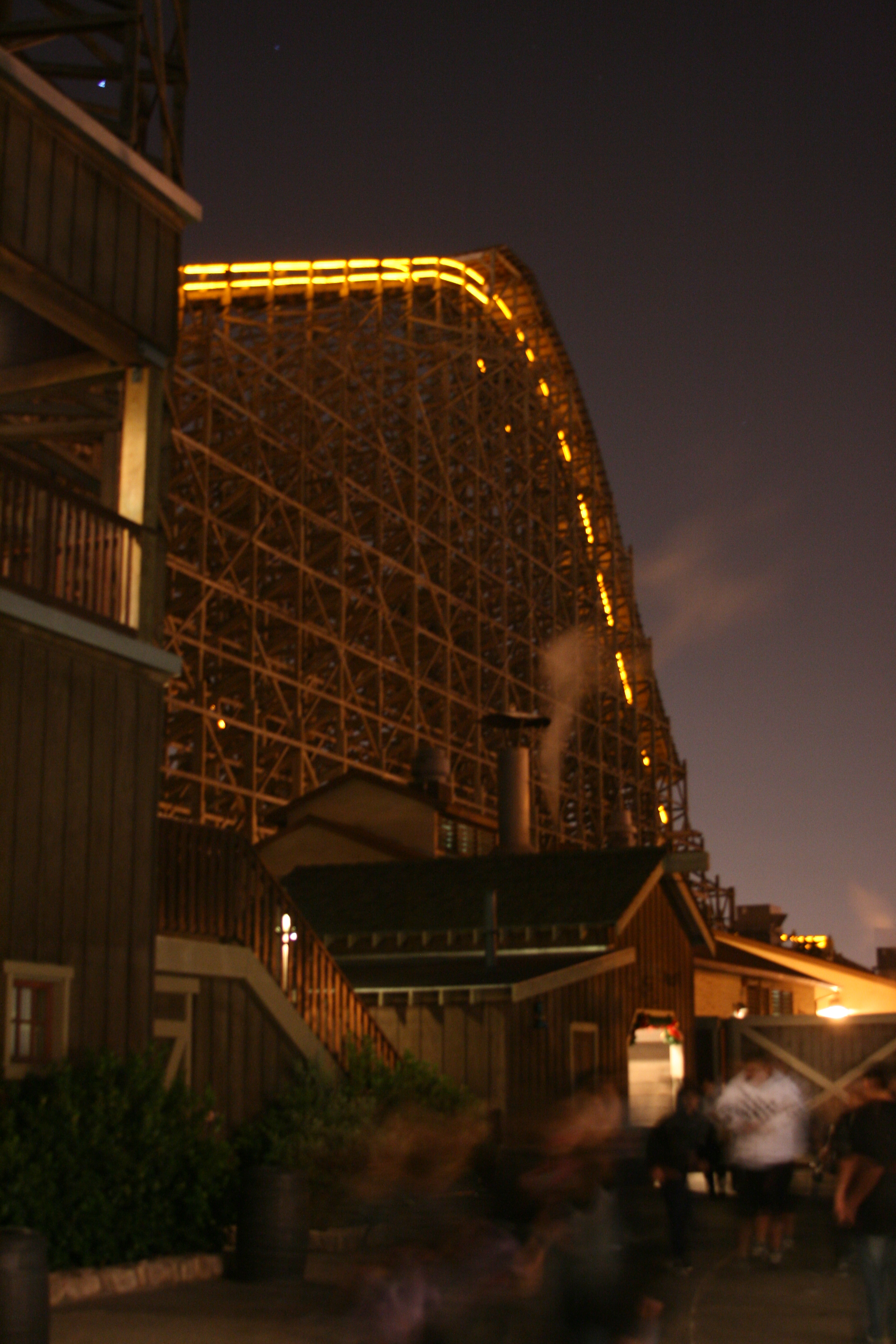
GhostRider at night

- 1998: GhostRider; Supreme Scream; Woodstock's Airmail; XK-1 removed; Knott's Pacific Pavilion removed; Slingshot renamed Wave Swinger; Mexican Hat Dance renamed Hat Dance.
- 1999: Wipeout; Coasters restaurant; Charlie Brown Speedway; Sky Jump removed; HeadAche removed and renamed The Blue Thunder at Miracle Strip Amusement Park; Pacific Pavilion removed; Radisson Resort Knott's Berry Farm.
- 2000: Perilous Plunge; Knott's Soak City U.S. water park; Windjammer Surf Racers closes; Haunted Shack removed.
- 2001: VertiGo; Wipeout relocated; Headspin relocated and renamed Wilderness Scrambler.
- 2002: Xcelerator; VertiGo removed
- 2003: Tampico Tumbler removed; Gran Slammer removed; La Revolución; Joe Cool's Gr8 Sk8; HammerHead removed.
- 2004: Silver Bullet; Lucy's Tugboat; RipTide; Screamin' Swing; Kingdom of the Dinosaurs closed; Church of Reflections relocated to outside of park; Radisson Resort Knott's Berry Farm renamed Knott's Berry Farm Resort Hotel. Grand Sierra Scenic Railroad shortened and the Little Chapel by the Lake (aka Adobe Chapel) removed to accommodate construction of Silver Bullet.
- 2005: TGI Fridays restaurant (California Marketplace).
- 2006: Pacific Spin (Soak City U.S.); Johnny Rockets restaurant; Walter K Steamboat removed; New Perilous Plunge boats put into operation; Woodstock's Airmail relocated.
- 2007: Sierra Sidewinder; Wilderness Scrambler removed.
- 2008: Pony Express; Peanut's Playhouse removed.

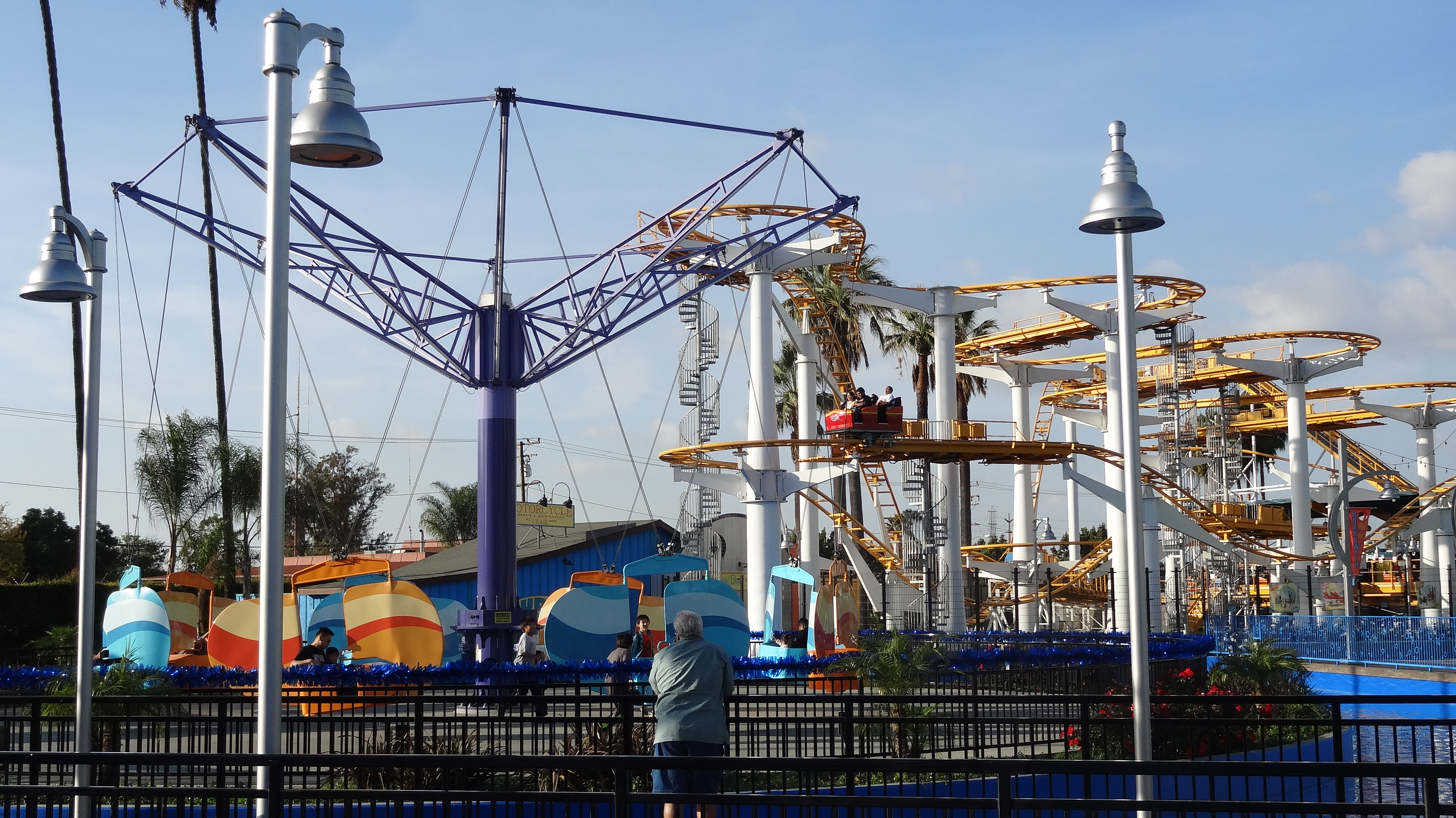
Coast Rider and Surfside Gliders opened in May 2013 as part of the boardwalk expansion.

- 2009: Pink's; Remodel and rebrand of Viva La Coasters in the California Marketplace.
- 2010: Snoopy's Starlight Spectacular added; Snoopy's Christmas Spectacular.
- 2011: WindSeeker
- 2012: Fast Lane; Park improvements – Replacing area theme music, removing boardwalks and pouring concrete replacements, rebuilding rotted wood structures, keeping open until park closing attractions, restaurants & shops which had previously closed early. More aggressive youth marketing & advertising; Perilous Plunge closes
- 2013: Boardwalk expansion: Coast Rider; Surfside Gliders; Pacific Scrambler (all replaced Perilous Plunge); WindSeeker removed; Bob Weir (who was the Knott's woodcarver from 1986 until retiring in 2024) begins restoring the models of the California missions. The missions had been removed in various renovations in the 1980s and 1990s, and in some cases had to be rebuilt from scratch. New enclosures for the missions were built and installed.
- 2014: Charlie Brown's Kite Flyer; Linus Launcher; Pig Pen's Mud Buggies; Grand Sierra Scenic Railroad, Lucy's Tugboat and Rocky Road Trucking Company rethemed as Grand Sierra Railroad, Rapid River Run and Rocky Mountain Trucking Company; Charlie Brown's Speedway, Joe Cool's GR8 SK8, Kingdom of the Dinosaurs, Log Peeler and Snoopy Bounce removed. La Tiendita removed.
- 2015: Voyage to the Iron Reef; Screamin' Swing closed in preparation for removal; GhostRider closed for major refurbishment.
- 2016: Ghost Town is renovated to celebrate its 75th birthday; RipTide officially closed and demolished due to technical issues; Starbucks replaces Dreyer's in the California Marketplace; Mrs. Knott's Chicken Dinner Restaurant undergoes major renovations; GhostRider reopens from its major refurbishment on June 10, 2016; Temporarily removed Wipeout for HangTime construction.
- 2017: Sol Spin; new Boardwalk Barbecue restaurant; Added VRCADE; Boomerang closes; Montezooma's Revenge receives new color scheme.; Brought back Ghost Town Alive; Extended Boysenberry Festival; Soak City gets an expansion
- 2018: HangTime; Sky Cabin reopened on February 10; Wipeout relocated and reopened in October; Bigfoot Rapids closes in September to undergo major renovation and new theming as Calico River Rapids.
- 2019: Calico River Rapids opened in May.
- 2020: Voyage to the Iron Reef closed on January 5, Knott's Bear-y Tales: Return to the Fair was set to open in the former spot of Voyage to the Iron Reef; the entire park was shut down on March 14 on grounds of COVID-19 pandemic.
- 2021: Knott's Berry Farm reopens after a year-long closure on May 6 to season pass holders; Knott's Berry Farm's grand reopening and Knott's Bear-y Tales: Return to the Fair opens to the general public on May 21; Knott's Berry Farm's 100th anniversary celebration begins May 21 to September 6, 2021.
- 2022: Montezooma's Revenge closed for a major renovation, set to reopen in 2023 as MonteZOOMa: The Forbidden Fortress.
- 2023: Sol Spin, La Revolucion, and Dragon Swing are all repainted to fit into the refreshed Fiesta Village; Casa California opens in place of the old arcade in Fiesta Village; Carousel was renamed Carrusel de California; Waveswinger renamed Los Voladores; Timberline Twister and Camp Bus removed.
- 2024: Snoopy's Tenderpaw Twister Coaster; Sally's Swing Along; Huff and Puff and High Sierra Ferris Wheel removed; Rocky Mountain Trucking Company and Grand Sierra Railroad are rethemed to Camp Snoopy's Off-Road Rally and Beagle Express.
- 2026: Montezooma's Revenge reopens as MonteZOOMA: The Forbidden Fortress on August 6.

== Annual park events ==
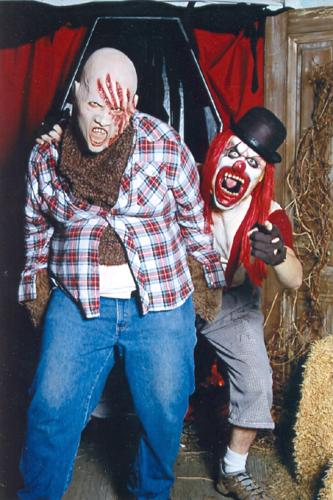
Knott's Scary Farm event

The park's annual Knott's Scary Farm has drawn crowds since 1973. The idea for this event was presented at one of the regularly scheduled round table meetings for managers by Patricia Pawson. The actual event was created by Bill Hollingshead, Gary Salisbury, Martha Boyd and Gene Witham, along with other members of the Knott's Berry Farm Entertainment Department as documented in the DVD Season of Screams. Initially, fake corpses and other static figures were rented from a Hollywood prop house, but Bud Hurlbut, the creator/concessionaire of the Mine Ride, Log Ride and other rides at Knott's, decided that this wasn't enough. He dressed up in a gorilla suit and started scaring guests on the Mine Ride. Halloween Haunt was an instant hit, and by the next year, the event sold out nightly. During this special ticketed event, the entire park (or major portions of it) re-themes itself into a "haunted house" style attraction in the form of mazes and "scare zones" in the evening. Over a thousand specially employed monsters are also scattered—often hidden out of view—throughout the park at this time. Some of the characters have become well-known, such as the Green Witch, which was portrayed by Charlene Parker from 1983 to 2017, the longest of any performer. Several attractions are decorated for the event including the Timber Mountain Log Ride and Calico Mine Train and there are 13 mazes of various themes. Elvira (actress Cassandra Peterson) was introduced into the Halloween Event in 1982 and was prominently featured in many Halloween Haunt events until 2001. According to postings on her My Space page, Cassandra was released from her contract by the park's new owners due to their wanting a more family-friendly appeal. She returned for one night in 2012 for the 40th anniversary of the event then again featured in her nightly show from 2014 to 2017. During October, Knott's Scary Farm generates half the revenue for Knott's Berry Farm's fiscal year.

Season of Screams is a DVD produced by an independent company that traces the beginnings of Halloween Haunt and the story behind how it all got started back in 1973. Season of Screams also highlights recent Halloween Haunts.

Winter Coaster Solace is an event that takes place on the first or second weekend of March every year when roller coaster enthusiasts can come before the park opens and stay after the park closes to ride the rides and eat at the Chicken Dinner Restaurant. It is intended to provide "solace" to visitors from other parts of the country where theme parks and roller coasters are seasonal, not year-round operations like the Southern California parks. Knott's Berry Farm also used to give attendees behind-the-scenes tours of the rides.

A Christmas event known as "Knott's Merry Farm" also happens annually. Previous Merry Farm events have included manufactured snow, handcraft exhibits, and a visit with Santa Claus. This event was created by Gary Salisbury in the fall of 1985.

Praise has been a Christian-themed celebration presented for many years as a mix-in special event of music and comedy on New Year's Eve.

Every spring, a boysenberry-themed food festival is held at Knott's that has food and drink prepared in a variety of ways with boysenberries. There are also special shows and music for the multi-week event.

== Areas and attractions ==
The park consists of four themed areas:

- Ghost Town
- Fiesta Village
- The Boardwalk
- Camp Snoopy

=== Ghost Town ===
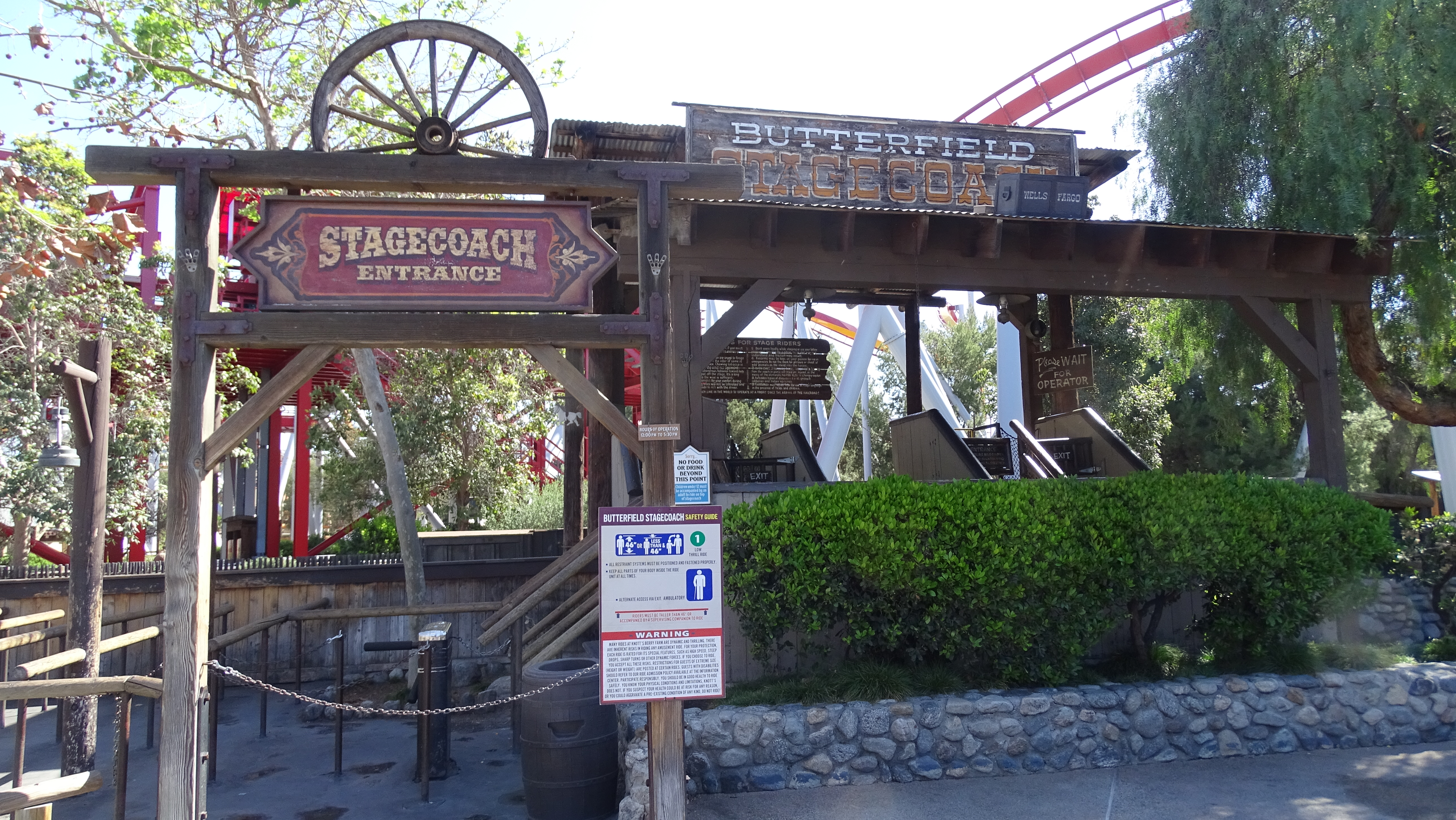
Butterfield Stagecoach's entrance

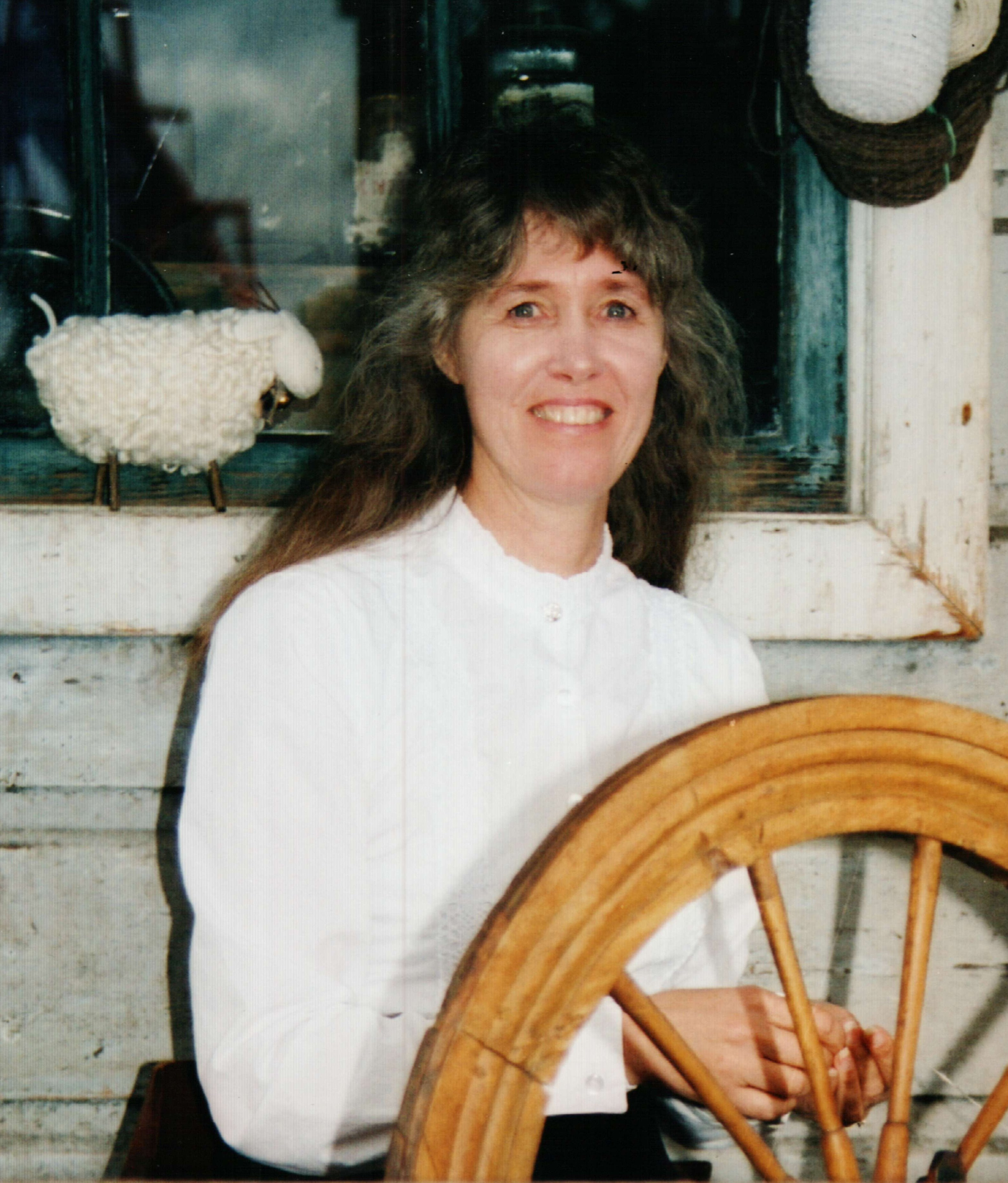
Charlene Parker, a spinner and weaver in Ghost Town

Ghost Town is based on the ghost town of Calico, California and other real ghost towns in the Western United States. Walter Knott inherited his uncle's silver mill and land, then bought more of the actual ghost town in 1951 and developed it. In 1966, he donated that property to the corporate-municipal County of San Bernardino which then made the town of Calico into a public historic park, for which it charged an entrance/parking fee.

Craftsmen in Ghost Town demonstrate the arts of the blacksmith, woodcarver, glassblower, sign cutter, and spinner. Demonstrations of narrow-gauge railroading and farm equipment hobbyists accompany additional merchant stalls of cottage-craft fairs seasonally at discounted admission which is restricted to Ghost Town only.

The Ghost Town area has a few other notable attractions. The Bird Cage Theatre is an old-fashioned theater in Ghost Town. It only hosts two seasonal entertainments—during "Knott's Merry Farm", which includes two small productions: "Marley's Wings" and "A Christmas Carol", for the 2021 season, and "The Gift of the Magi" and "A Christmas Carol" for the 2022 season, and as well as a Halloween Haunt thrill show. The Calico Stage, a large open-air stage in Calico Square, hosts a variety of shows and acts, big and small, from "Home for the Holidays", a Knott's Merry Farm Christmas skit with singing, those of elementary school students, Gallagher, a local band, and the summer-spectacular All Wheels Extreme stunt show featuring youthful performers demonstrating aerial tricks with acrobatics, trampolines, and riding ramps with skates, scooters, skateboards, and freestyle bikes to popular music. The Calico Saloon recreates the revelry of music, singing and dancing, with Cameo Kate hosting a variety of acts. Jersey Lily, Judge Roy Bean's combination courthouse/saloon, offers certified comical "genuine illegal hitchin'" alongside pickles, candy, and sports/soft drinks.

The park formerly featured a 5th area. Formerly known as Wild Water Wilderness, now part of Ghost Town, the area features two major rides: the Pony Express, a horse-themed family roller coaster installed in 2008 and Calico River Rapids, which opened in 1988 and was refurbished with a new theme for the 2019 season. Near Pony Express is Rapids Trader, a small merchandise stand. It is also home to Mystery Lodge, a multimedia show based on an Expo 86 pavilion featuring a Native American storyteller.

Western Trails Museum, relocated between the candy store and the General Store to accommodate Calico River Rapids (formerly Bigfoot Rapids), still features historical western artifacts large and small, from a hand-powered horse-drawn fire engine to a miniature replica of a borax hauling "Twenty Mule Team" and utensils necessary to survive the prairie and wilderness.

A common misconception is that at Knott's the terms "Ghost Town" and "Calico" are interchangeable, but that is not the case. Walter Knott explained that he built Ghost Town as a composite to represent ghost towns throughout the West, rather than as a replica of any one particular ghost town. The Calico Saloon was not named "Ghost Town" because it is supposedly located in Calico. Rather, it was named for the tradition of lining Gold-Rush-era buildings with red calico fabric. Also, the Ghost Town & Calico Railroad was named because "Ghost Town" and "Calico" are two separate places. Walter Knott always referred to the Old West section of Knott's Berry Farm as "Ghost Town", not "Calico."

Some parts of Ghost Town are forever lost to progress. The conversion of the Silver Dollar Saloon to a shooting gallery, Hunters Paradise shooting gallery to Panda Express and the original Berry Stand, moved several times with its last location now occupied by the Silver Bullet station.

Thrill level (out of 5)
1 (low) 2 (mild) 3 (moderate) 4 (high) 5 (aggressive)

Ride	Picture	Opened	Manufacturer	Description	Thrill level
Butterfield; Stagecoach		1949	Knott's; Berry Farm	A family stagecoach ride that takes guests through the areas of Fiesta Village, Camp Snoopy and the Indian Trails area.	1
Calico Mine Ride		1960	Bud Hurlbut	A 2 ft (610 mm) narrow-gauge mine train dark ride. Riders board ore cars headed by battery-powered locomotives and journey down a gravity railroad deep into a faux mining excavation site. The ride closed for refurbishment in January 2014 and reopened on June 14, 2014.	3
Calico River Rapids		1988	Intamin (Rethemed by Garner Holt Productions)	Formerly Bigfoot Rapids. A river rafting water ride. For the 2019 season, the attraction was refurbished to feature roughly 20 wildlife animatronics and water effects from Garner Holt Productions.	4
Ghost Town & Calico Railroad		1952	Baldwin Locomotive Works	An authentic 3 ft (914 mm) narrow-gauge train ride around the park. The ten-minute ride takes guests through the Wild Wilderness area, the Boardwalk area and Fiesta Village. All of the Passenger Cars came from the D&RGW, while one came from the Rio Grande Southern. Some of the D&RGW cars were used on the San Juan Express.	1
GhostRider		1998	Custom Coasters International (Retracked by Great Coasters International)	A wooden roller coaster featuring multiple un-banked turns.	5
Pony Express		2008	Zamperla	A steel roller coaster in which riders dip, turn and dive while harnessed in vehicles intended to simulate equestrianism.	4
Silver Bullet		2004	Bolliger & Mabillard	A Bolliger & Mabillard inverted roller coaster featuring 6 inversions.	5
Timber Mountain Log Ride		1969	Bud Hurlbut & Arrow Development	A family friendly and classic themed log flume dark ride attraction. The 4-minute ride features two major drops, of which the final drop is 42 feet. The ride opened in 1969 and re-opened in 2013 after an extensive refurbishment. The ride features more than 40 audio animatronics developed by Garner Holt Productions, forest scents and an exclusive ride soundtrack.	5

=== Fiesta Village ===
Fiesta Village was built in 1969 under the pretense of a Mexican theme. It was built to pay tribute to California's Spanish and Mexican heritage. It was the second area constructed after the completion of Ghost Town. Stores like Casa California, restaurants like Pancho's Tacos, La Papa Loca, and La Victoria Cantina, games like Shoot If Yucan, and themed rides like La Revolución, Jaguar!, and MonteZOOMa: The Forbidden Fortress, along with the former attraction Tampico Tumbler, all contribute to the Mexican and Aztec theme of the area. In 2013 colorful string lights were added for the summer season. In July 2022, Fiesta Village underwent a major renovation and reopened on May 26th, 2023.

Ride	Picture	Year opened	Manufacturer	Description	Thrill level
Carrusel De California		1955	Dentzel Carousel	One of the world's oldest working Dentzel Carousels, this 100-year-old ride still revolves to the strains of its antique Band Organ. Menagerie carousel's 48 hand-carved animals including lions, tigers, ostriches, camels, zebras, giraffes, pigs, cats and horses. A Wurlitzer No. 157 Band Organ is also present, but unrestored.	1
Dragon Swing		1980	Chance Rides	Formerly was themed to a swinging pirate ship. With the new reimagined renovation, the attraction was repainted to have the appearance of an alebrije.	3
Hat Dance		1969	Rauenhorst Corporation & Mack Rides	A Teacups type ride. Riders spin sombrero-themed cuencos as they rotate on counterrevolutionary turntables. Originally named Happy Sombrero.	3
Jaguar!		1995	Zierer	A steel family roller coaster.	4
La Revolucion		2003	Chance-Morgan	Riders rotate 360 degrees while simultaneously swinging back and forth in a pendulum motion.	5
Los Voladores		1986	Zierer	A classic family swing ride. Riders board individual swing sets before orbiting a central tower. Originally named Slingshot, then changed to Waveswinger until Fiesta's renovation in 2023.	3
MonteZOOMa: The Forbidden Fortress Formerly Montezooma's Revenge		1978	Anton Schwarzkopf	Riders accelerate from 0 to 55 mph (89 km/h) in 4.5 seconds. This coaster was awarded the American Coaster Enthusiasts Coaster Landmark Award on June 20, 2019. The coaster is the last Schwarzkopf Shuttle Loop left in the U.S. Formerly called Montezooma's Revenge (1978–2022).	5
Sol Spin		2017	Mondial	A thrilling topsy-turvy adventure over 6 stories high as they rotate in all directions on one of six spinning arms. It was built on the spot of Windseeker.	5

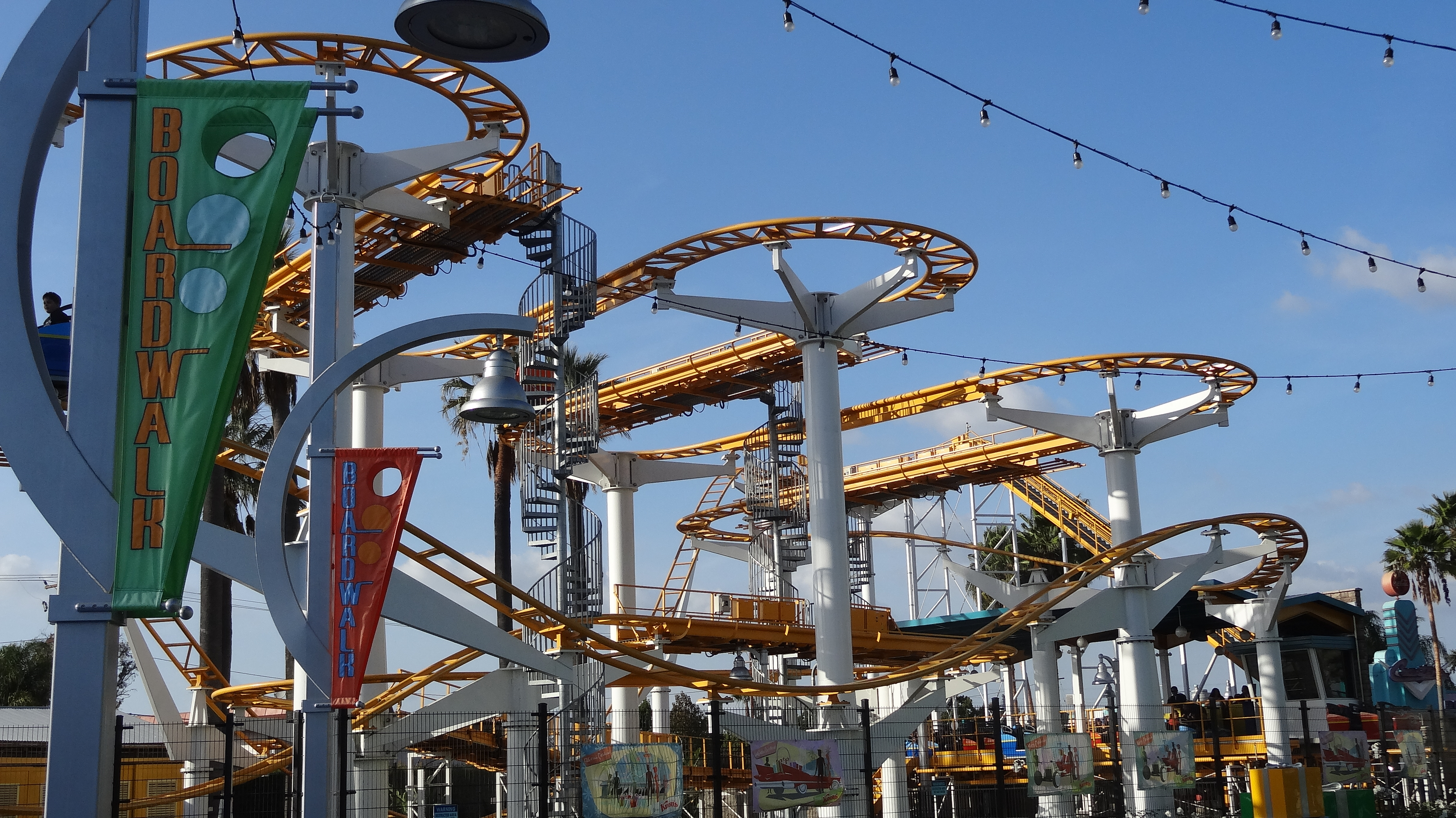
A view of The Boardwalk following its 2013 expansion

=== The Boardwalk ===
Boardwalk Games include physical challenges such as a three-point challenge, baseball, and test your strength. Hawkers pitch a variety of traditional games as well, such as water racers, bucket toss, whack a mole, and ping pong toss. In September 2012, Perilous Plunge – one of Knott's major thrill rides – closed for an expansion of the Boardwalk. The boardwalk reopened a year later with two flat rides and a new family roller coaster taking the place of Perilous Plunge. The Boomerang roller coaster was repainted in green and yellow. Boomerang was removed in 2017 to make way for HangTime.

At the south end of the boardwalk is the family interactive dark ride: Knott's Bear-y Tales: Return to the Fair. The world's largest Johnny Rockets restaurant was located at Knott's Boardwalk, featuring over 5,900 square feet (550 m^{2}) of indoor dining space for more than 260 guests, before being closed to make way for Crafty's Kitchen. Also located in The Boardwalk is the 2000-seat Walter Knott Theater hosting seasonal offerings, notably the ice-skating show "Snoopy's Night Before Christmas", with several different ice shows in the past, one of which, "Merry Christmas Snoopy!" relocated to California's Great America, another Cedar Fair park. It was renamed in 2020 from the Charles M. Schulz Theater to the Walter Knott Theater, as part of a refurbishment of the exterior for the park's 100th anniversary, which also included new LED signage to the theater's marquee.

Ride	Picture	Year opened	Manufacturer	Description	Thrill level
Coast Rider		2013	Mack Rides	A steel wild mouse roller coaster. The ride's layout is on the former site of Perilous Plunge.	4
HangTime		2018	Gerstlauer	A steel Infinity Coaster. The ride's layout is on the former site of Boomerang and Riptide. The ride is America's first and only coaster of this type. The ride features a 96-degree drop and 5 inversions.	5
Knott's Bear-y Tales: Return to the Fair		2021	Triotech	A 4D interactive dark ride that blends 3D projections and special effects, such as simulated wind and aromas, with physical sets. Debuted for the park's 100th anniversary and replacing Voyage to the Iron Reef, its theme pays homage to the retired Knott's Bear-y Tales.	2
Pacific Scrambler		2013	Eli Bridge Company	Originally "Whirlpool" from 1989 to 1996, Pacific Scrambler is a classic scrambler amusement ride. When the area opened in 1996, this was a ride called Whirlpool, it was housed inside a building that featured 'undersea' murals on the walls, musical soundtrack effects, and concert-style lighting effects. In 2000, it was replaced with a Shoot the Chutes ride called Perilous Plunge. The ride eventually closed down in 2012 and was replaced with three new rides, including Pacific Scrambler	3
Sky Cabin		1976	Intamin	A gyro tower that ascends over 180 feet in the slow-moving Sky Cabin for a 360-degree panoramic view of Orange County and the Los Angeles Basin.	2
Supreme; Scream		1998	S&S Worldwide	Supreme Scream features the highest drop in the park. A vertical ascending and descending drop ride. It features 3 Turbo Drop towers.	5
Surfside; Gliders		2013	Larson International	A Flying Scooters ride with a height of 28 feet. Riders can pilot and move the gliders as it offers them a good view of the Boardwalk area.	3
Wheeler Dealer Bumper Cars		1975	Majestic Manufacturing	A classic family bumper cars attraction.	4
Wipeout		1999	Chance Rides	A Trabant circular ride located between Hangtime and Sky Cabin.	4
Xcelerator		2002	Intamin	A launched roller coaster in which riders accelerate from 0 to 82 mph (132 km/h) in 2.3 seconds and climb 20 stories into the air. Xcelerator is currently the tallest roller coaster at Knotts Berry Farm. Xcelerator features the park's second-highest drop.	5

=== Camp Snoopy ===
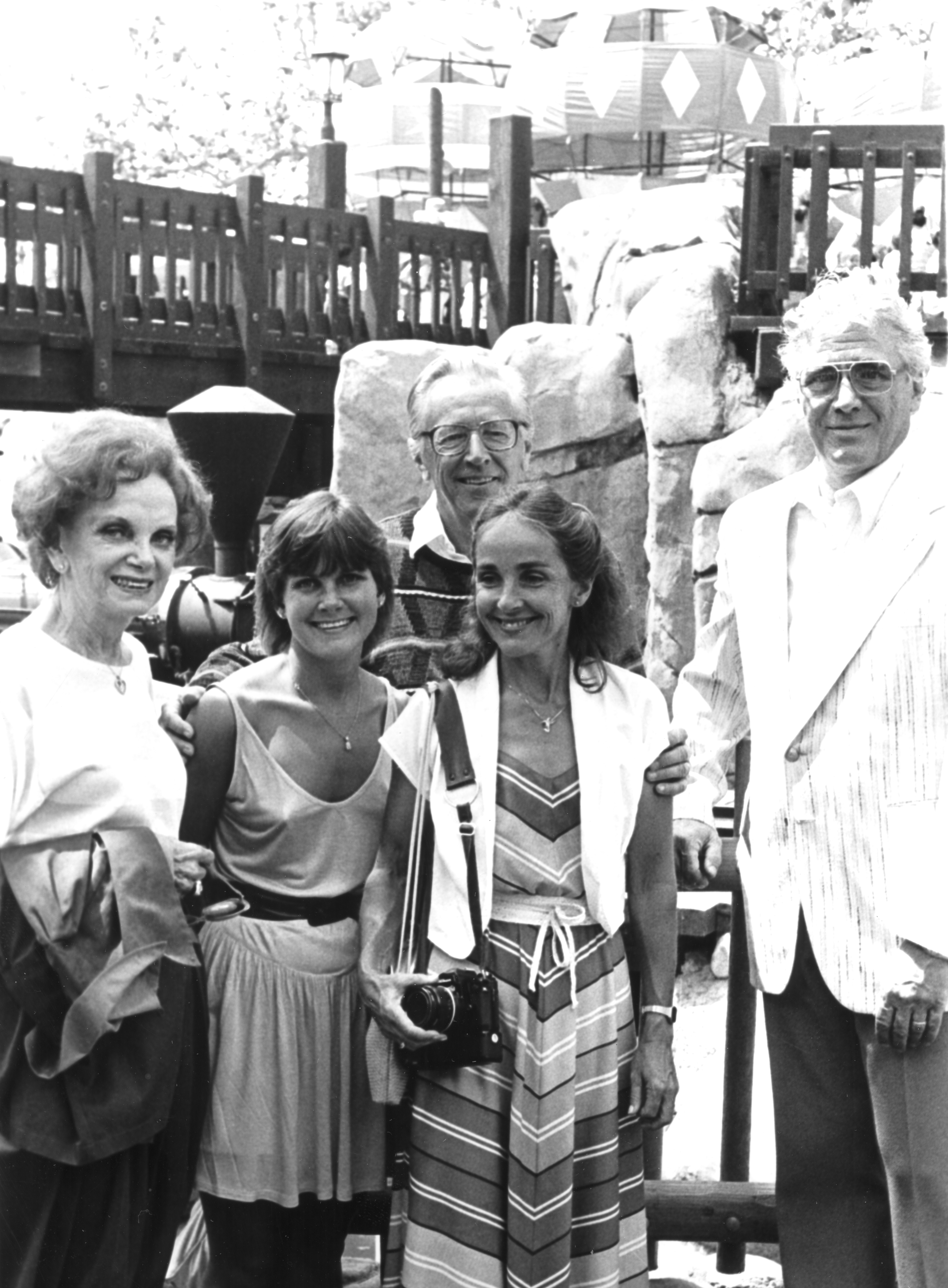
Peanuts cartoonist Charles M. Schulz (center) visits the construction site of "Camp Snoopy" with daughter Jill Schulz, Marion Knott and others, c. 1983

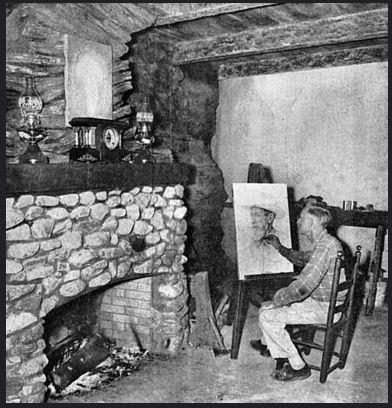
Claude Bell in his new Artist's Studio at Knott's Berry Farm, drawing Ed Strouse, Feb. 1954. This building is now the Rock & Geode Shop. Photo courtesy Orange County Archives.

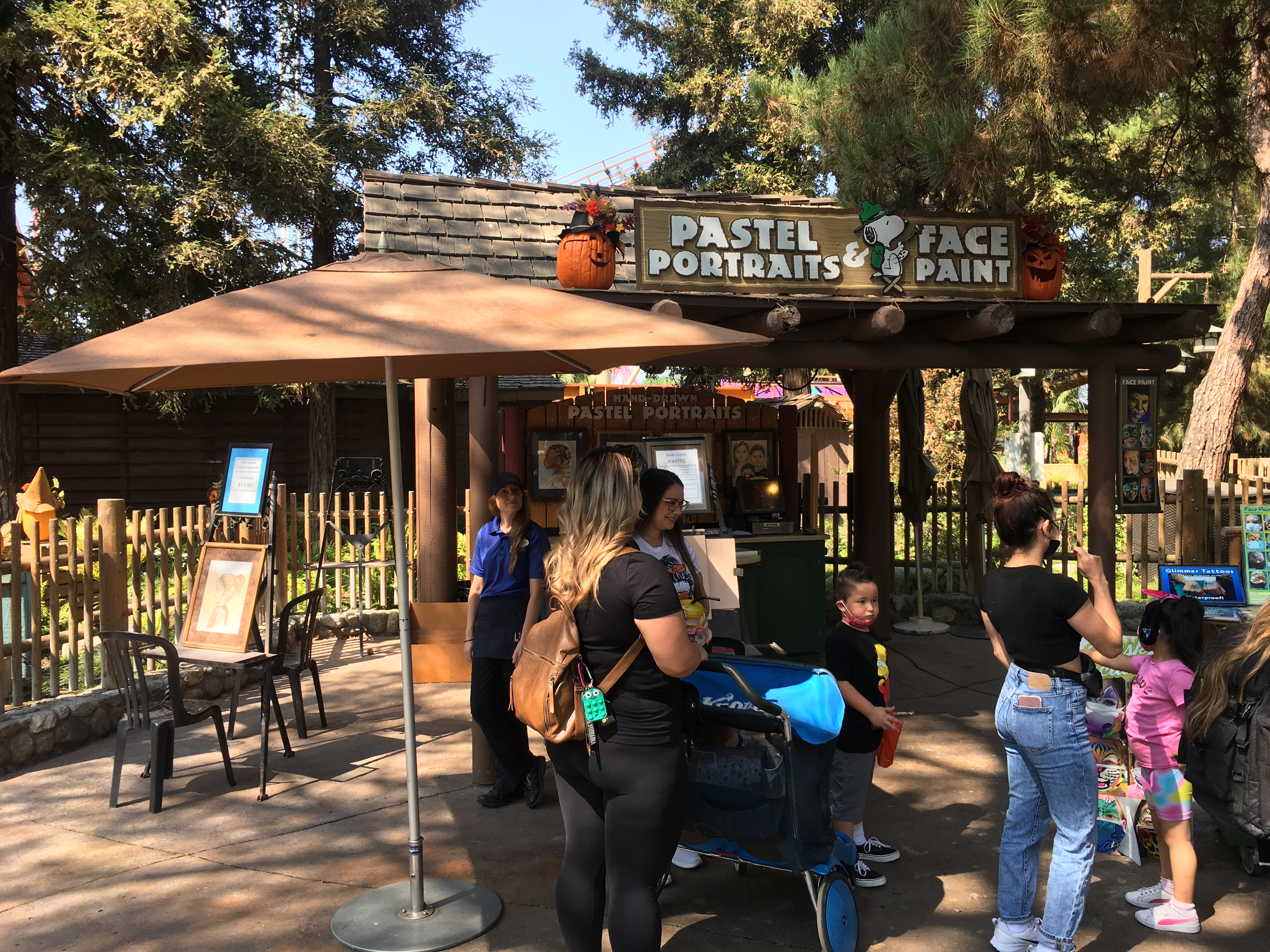
Portrait artists and face painting at the north end of Camp Snoopy.

Camp Snoopy is home to the park's family and children's rides, with many of the rides and attractions being built specifically for children and guests who cannot ride the park's more aggressive attractions. Its theme is Charles M. Schulz' "Peanuts" comic strip characters. Snoopy has been the mascot of Knott's Berry Farm since 1983, and the characters can now be seen at some of Six Flags' parks. For guests who cannot ride the park's more aggressive and thrilling rides, Camp Snoopy contains a good number of rides for guests of all ages including infants, children, and seniors. Except for Sierra Sidewinder, the rides are relatively tame.

Knott's Berry Farm also built the Mall of America's indoor theme park, which itself was originally called Camp Snoopy. (In fact, Charles M. Schulz hailed from St. Paul.) However, today the park is no longer affiliated with Knott's or Cedar Fair and is now called Nickelodeon Universe.

On November 22, 2013, Knott's Berry Farm announced major improvements in the area of Camp Snoopy. Camp Snoopy received a makeover for its 30th anniversary. In summer 2014, Knott's Berry Farm opened up new rides in Camp Snoopy.

The 2 ft (610 mm) narrow-gauge Beagle Express takes guest on a four-minute train ride through the reflection lake. The ride was made shorter with the construction of Silver Bullet. As part of the 30th Anniversary makeover, the train ride received a series of Peanuts vignettes (made by Garner Holt Productions) along the track and narration by the character Linus.

Knott's has portrait artists, as well as face painters and caricature artists in two different locations in Camp Snoopy operated by Kaman's Art Shoppes. Portrait artists have a long history at Knott's, dating back to 1951. Claude Bell, who created the concrete characters on the benches at Knott's, operated the portrait concession from 1951 to 1986. Bell also sculpted the minuteman statue on display at Independence Hall.

Ride	Picture	Year opened	Manufacturer	Description	Thrill level
Balloon Race		1983	Bradley and Kaye D. H. Morgan Manufacturing	Replaced w/new redesigned unit 1992	2
Charlie Brown's Kite Flyer		2014	Zamperla		2
Beagle Express Railroad		1983	Crown Metal Products	Underwent a 2013 Renovation by Garner Holt Productions. Originally powered by a Crown Metal locomotive, a new train was introduced in 2024.	1
Linus Launcher		2014	Zamperla	A kite flyer ride.	3
Pig Pen's Mud Buggies		2014	Zamperla		2
Rapid River Run		2004	Zamperla		2
Rocky Road Trucking Company		1983	Zamperla	A kiddie convoy ride.	1
Sierra Sidewinder		2007	Mack Rides		4
Camp Snoopy's Trail Trackers		2024	Zamperla		1
Sallys Swing-Along		2024	Zamperla		2
Snoopy's Tenderpaw Twister Coaster		2024	Zamperla		4

=== Indian Trails ===
Located next to the Bottle House in Ghost Town, Indian Trails is a small area sandwiched between Camp Snoopy, Ghost Town, and Fiesta Village, showcasing Native American art, crafts and dance.

=== Public area ===
Many of the original attractions are outside the gates of the current-day theme park along Grand Ave. at the California Marketplace, mostly things that would no longer be considered interesting to today's audience, or things that were merely decorative. Near the restrooms behind Berry Place are the waterfall overshooting the water wheel and historic gristmill grindstone, a replica of George Washington's Mount Vernon estate fireplace hearth, and what remains of the visible beehive. Some attractions still exist, but have been incorporated into backstage areas, such as the Rock Garden, now an employee smoking area. Other attractions have been removed, such as the historic volcano, and the cross-section of giant sequoia with age rings denoting historic events such as Christopher Columbus visiting America.

==== East property ====
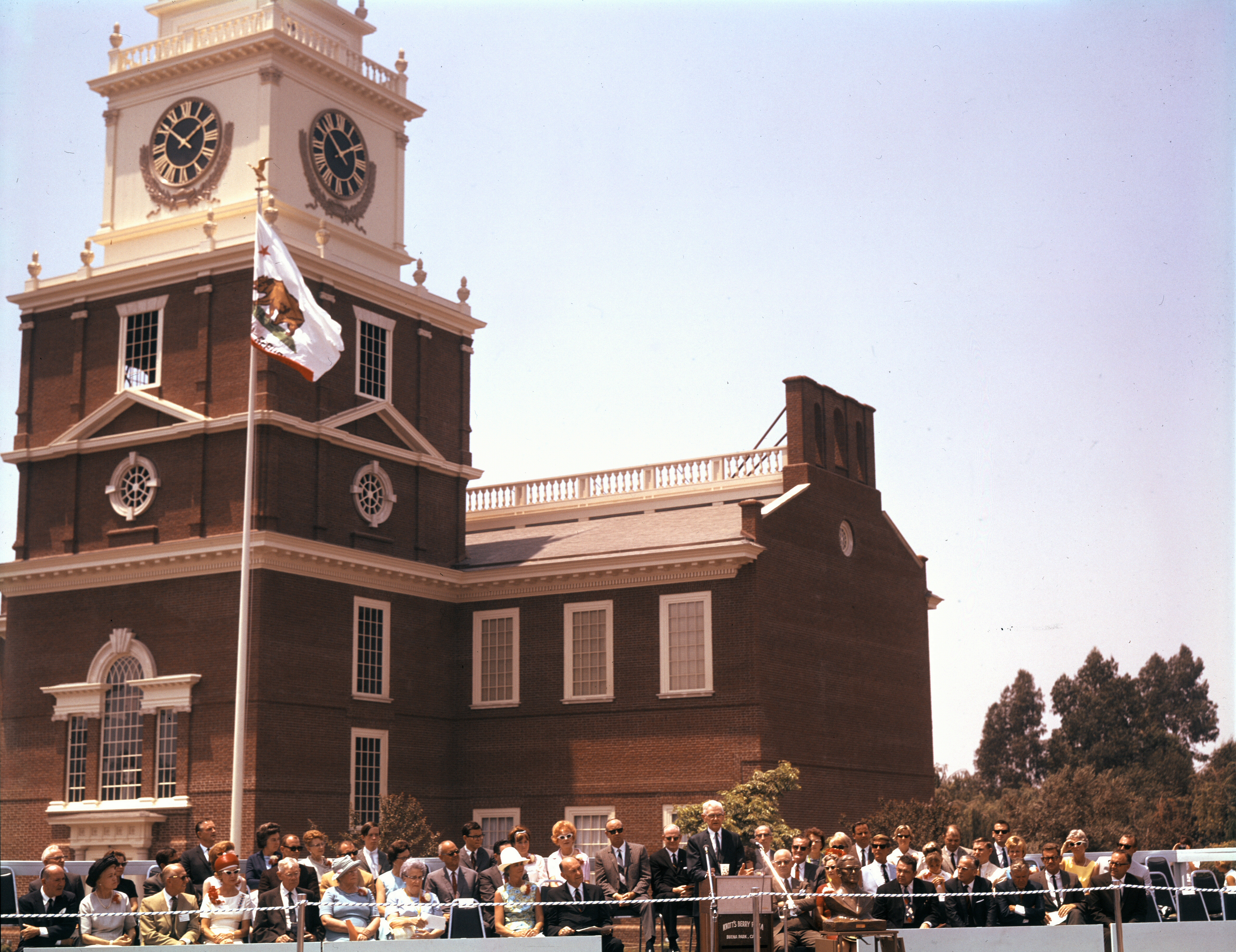
Walter Knott at the dedication of Knott's full-scale replica of Independence Hall, July 4, 1966.

The Independence Hall replica in 2013.

The east side of the property, divided by Beach Blvd., features the main parking lot, Knott's Soak City, a seasonal water park that requires separate admission, the picnic grounds rental areas, complimentary admission to Independence Hall and gift shop, and the Church of Reflections which was moved outside the theme park in 2004 and held non-denominational Sunday services until 2010. A tunnel and pedestrian underpass beneath Beach Blvd. connects the main parking lot to the shops, restaurants and theme park.

== Former attractions ==
- Boomerang – 1990–2017
- Cable Cars – 1955–1979
- Camp Bus – 1992–2023
- Charlie Brown's Speedway – 1992–2013
- Corkscrew – 1975–1989
- FearVR: 5150 – closed shortly after opening in 2016
- Fiesta Wheel – 1969–1986
- Gasoline Alley – 1969–1996
- Gran Slammer – 1987–2003
- Hammerhead – 1996–2003
- Haunted Shack – 1954–2000
- HeadAche – 1976–1999
- Henry's Auto Livery – 1957–1980
- Joe Cool's GR8 SK8 – 2003–2013
- Knott's Bear-y Tales/Kingdom of the Dinosaurs – 1975–2004
- Knott's Lagoon – 1964–1983
- Knott's Pacific Pavilion – 1986–1998
- Loop Trainer Flying Machine – 1976–1989
- Merry-Go-Round Auto Ride/Tijuana Taxi – 1969–1976
- Mexican Whip – 1969–1986
- Motorcycle Chase/Wacky Soap Box Racers – 1976–1996
- Mott's Miniatures – 1956–1992
- Perilous Plunge – 2000–2012
- Propeller Spin – 1976–1989
- RipTide – 2004–2016
- Screamin' Swing – 2005–2015
- Sky Jump – 1976–1999
- Tampico Tumbler – 1987–2003
- Timberline Twister – 1983–2023
- VertiGo – 2001–2002
- Voyage to the Iron Reef – 2015–2020
- Walter K. Steamboat – 1969–2004
- Whirlwind/Greased Lightning/HeadAche – 1976–1999
- Wilderness Scrambler – 2001–2007
- Windjammer Surf Racers – 1997–2000
- WindSeeker – 2011–2013
- XK-1 – 1990–1997

=== FearVR: 5150 controversy ===
For Halloween Haunt in 2016, Knott's Berry Farm introduced FearVR: 5150, a virtual reality attraction that was met with controversy from the mental health community regarding its perceived negative portrayal of mental illness. The ten-minute-long attraction immersed guests inside of a chaotic hospital haunted by a supernatural central character named Katie and zombie-like patients. The initial controversy came from the attraction's name, with 5150 referring to Welfare and Institutions Code section 5150, the California law that allows a law enforcement officer or clinician to involuntarily commit a person suspected of having a mental illness and determined "a danger to themselves or others". It also referenced the fact that guests experiencing the attraction had their arms strapped to a chair as part of the experience. The backlash was focused on Cedar Fair's use of painful experiences suffered by those dealing with mental illness and to have it "transmogrified into spooky entertainment". In response, Cedar Fair removed "5150" from the name, and after continued opposition, permanently closed the attraction on September 28, 2016, six days after its debut. A petition was signed by more than 2,000 people hoping Cedar Fair would bring it back, with the petition's organizer stating that Cedar Fair should not be "forced to shut down an attraction based on the words of people who had not even experienced the attraction".

== Knott's Soak City ==
Knott's Soak City is a water park. It opened on June 17, 2000, as Soak City U.S. It requires separate admission from Knott's Berry Farm. In addition to the water park across the street from the main theme park, Cedar Fair also formerly owned two other Knott's Soak City Parks, in Palm Springs and Chula Vista.

== Private police force ==
For much of the park's early history, Knott's Berry Farm had a unique arrangement with the Orange County Sheriff's Department where the park's security officers were sworn special deputies vested with full police powers. The Security Department, however, did not answer to the county sheriff, but rather to the park's Chief of Security (who for many years was Steve Knott, the grandson of Walter Knott). Knott's Berry Farm maintained a completely private police force, vested with full police powers, and overseen by park management.

Before the City of Buena Park was incorporated, Knott's Berry Farm's Security Department even provided police services to the nearby unincorporated area that would eventually become known as Buena Park, including writing traffic tickets. Then, in the early days of the incorporated City of Buena Park, Knott's Berry Farm Security provided vital mutual aid assistance to the Buena Park Police Department (formerly Buena Park Public Safety) during emergencies since Knott's Berry Farm's 34 sworn Special Deputies outnumbered, and were better equipped than the city's four-man Department of Public Safety.

The Orange County Sheriff Department discontinued this arrangement in the late 1980s but Knott's still maintains its own private (albeit unsworn) security force, and its "Station-K" public safety radio designation.

== Fast Lane ==
Fast Lane is a limited-access line queue system offered for an additional charge at Six Flags amusement parks. Visitors can purchase a wristband that allows them to bypass standard lines in favor of shorter ones at many of the parks' most popular attractions.

== Food products ==
The J.M. Smucker Company continued to sell the jam and preserves made famous by the Knott family for several years; however, other products, such as the syrups, were phased out due to low demand.

In November 2013, Knott's Berry Farm began selling its "Berry Market" brand of preserves at the park. The Berry Market brand is all-natural. They are unable to use "Knott's" on the label since Smucker's owns the rights to the name.

In January 2024, Smucker's discontinued the rest of the Knott's Berry Farm brand after low sales.

== Public transportation ==
Knott's Berry Farm can easily be accessed by various public transportation services. Service is available by the Los Angeles Metro and the Orange County Transportation Authority. Bus routes serving the park include Metro Express Line 460 which provides direct express service between Downtown Los Angeles and Disneyland and OCTA bus routes 29, 38 and 529.

== Attendance ==
2008	2009	2010	2011	2012	2013	2014	2015	2016	2017	2018	2019	2020	2021	2022	2023	2024
3,565,000	3,333,000	3,600,000	3,654,000	3,508,000	3,683,000	3,683,000	3,867,000	4,014,000	4,034,000	4,115,000	4,238,000	811,000	3,681,000	3,899,000	4,228,000	4,503,000

== See also ==
- Incidents at Knott's Berry Farm
- Old Maizeland School, a California Historic Landmark (no. 729) at Knott's Berry Farm
