= Calico River Rapids =

Ride at Knott's Berry Farm

Coordinates: 33°48′26″N 117°55′15″W

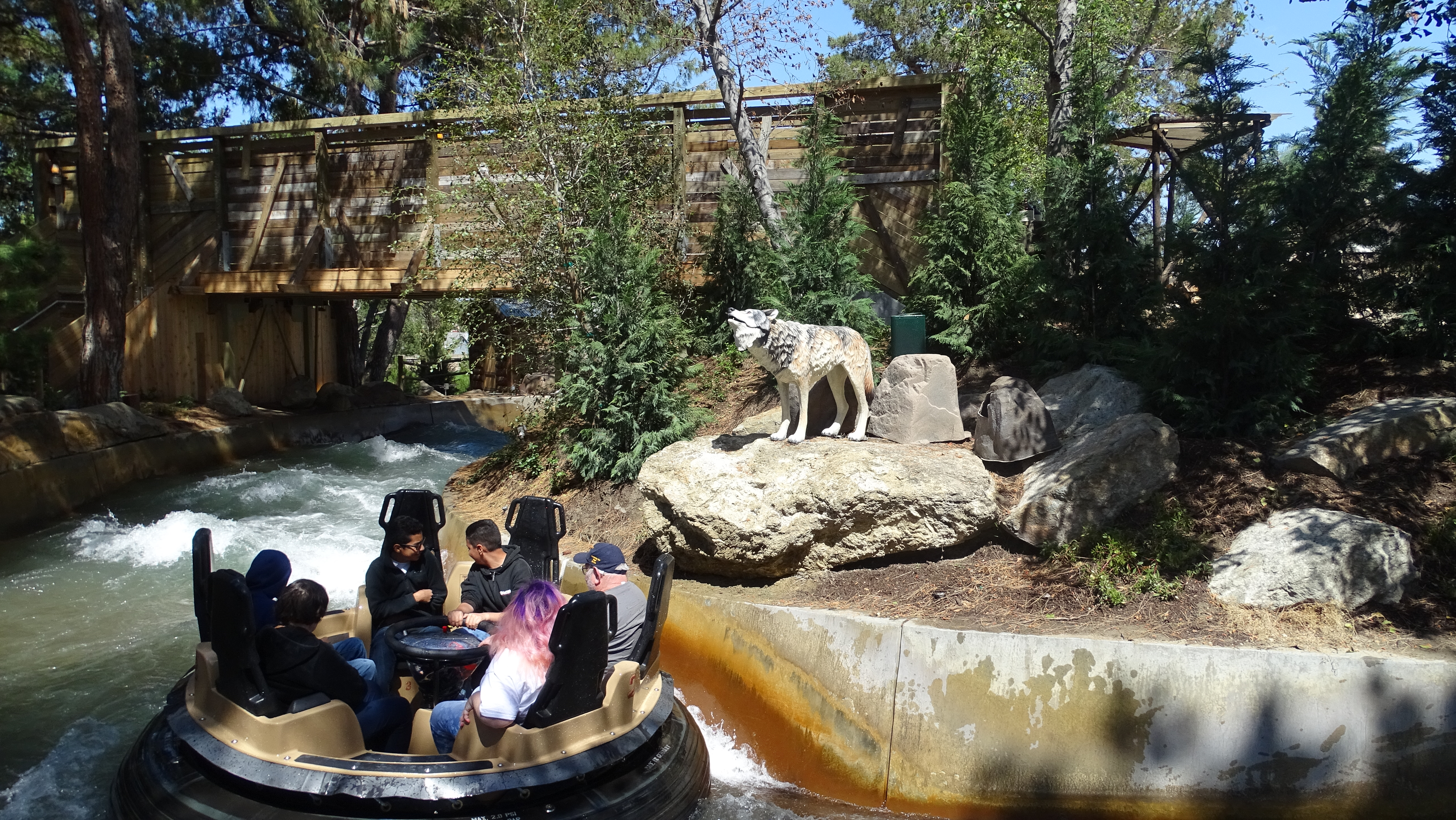

Knott's Berry Farm
- Area: Ghost Town
- Status: Operating
- Opening date: May 26, 1988

General statistics
- Type: River rapids ride
- Manufacturer: Intamin
- Designer: Garner Holt Productions, Chrestensen Design
- Duration: 4:00
- Boats: 25 boats. Riders are arranged 6 across in a single row for a total of 6 riders per boat.
- Height restriction: 46 in (117 cm)
- Control System: Dual Allen-Bradley PLC
- Theme: Calico ghost town
- Animatronics: 20
- Fast Lane available
- Must transfer from wheelchair

Calico River Rapids is a themed river rapids ride located at Knott's Berry Farm in Buena Park, California. The ride originally opened in 1988 as Bigfoot Rapids and was originally constructed by Intamin. For the 2019 season, the ride was refurbished with a western theme to match the well-themed Ghost Town section of the park. The renovated ride opened on May 17, 2019.

== Overview ==
Calico River Rapids provides a new back story of Ghost Town and takes place during the early days of Knott's Ghost Town. Moreover, the ride's backstory provides the introduction of two new characters in the fictional town of Ghost Town, Potts and Colter. Both of these characters served as the focal background story of Ghost Town and are played as actual characters during Knott's summer Ghost Town Alive season. Calico River Rapids provides guests an experience of setting the Calico River which Potts and Colter explored leading to the discover of the Calico River Territory.

== History ==
The ride originally opened on May 26, 1988 as Bigfoot Rapids and was originally constructed by Intamin. The ride was formerly in an area called "Wild Water Wilderness" but was never theoretically part of the well themed Ghost Town. Bigfoot Rapids featured trees throughout its surrounding area but minimal theming. Despite the name, the ride was never themed or featured any Bigfoot appearance.

As there was little to no theming about bigfoot, it served to be major criticism of the attraction. The ride's age and Knott's Berry Farm commitment to returning to its theme park roots were major factors which led to the retheming of the former Bigfoot attraction. Towards the end of the 2018 season, Knott's Vice President of entertainment, Ken Parks, encouraged the park to close down the ride for extensive refurbishment and rethemed and reopened it as Calico River Rapids for the 2019 season. Knott's Berry Farm along with the efforts of Garner Holt Productions and Chrestensen Design revamped the attraction as a whole new themed experience with roughly 20 new animatronic figures as part of the extensive refurbishment, including a proper appearance of Bigfoot.

The ride reopened as Calico River Rapids on May 17, 2019 to large crowds. Since the ride's reopening, Calico River Rapids has been well received by park visitors in part due to its much improved theming from its previous incarnation (Bigfoot Rapids) and has become one of the park's best family rides.

== See also ==
- Timber Mountain Log Ride; Knott's Berry Farm other themed water ride
