= Beagle Express Railroad =

Peanuts train ride at Knott's Berry Farm

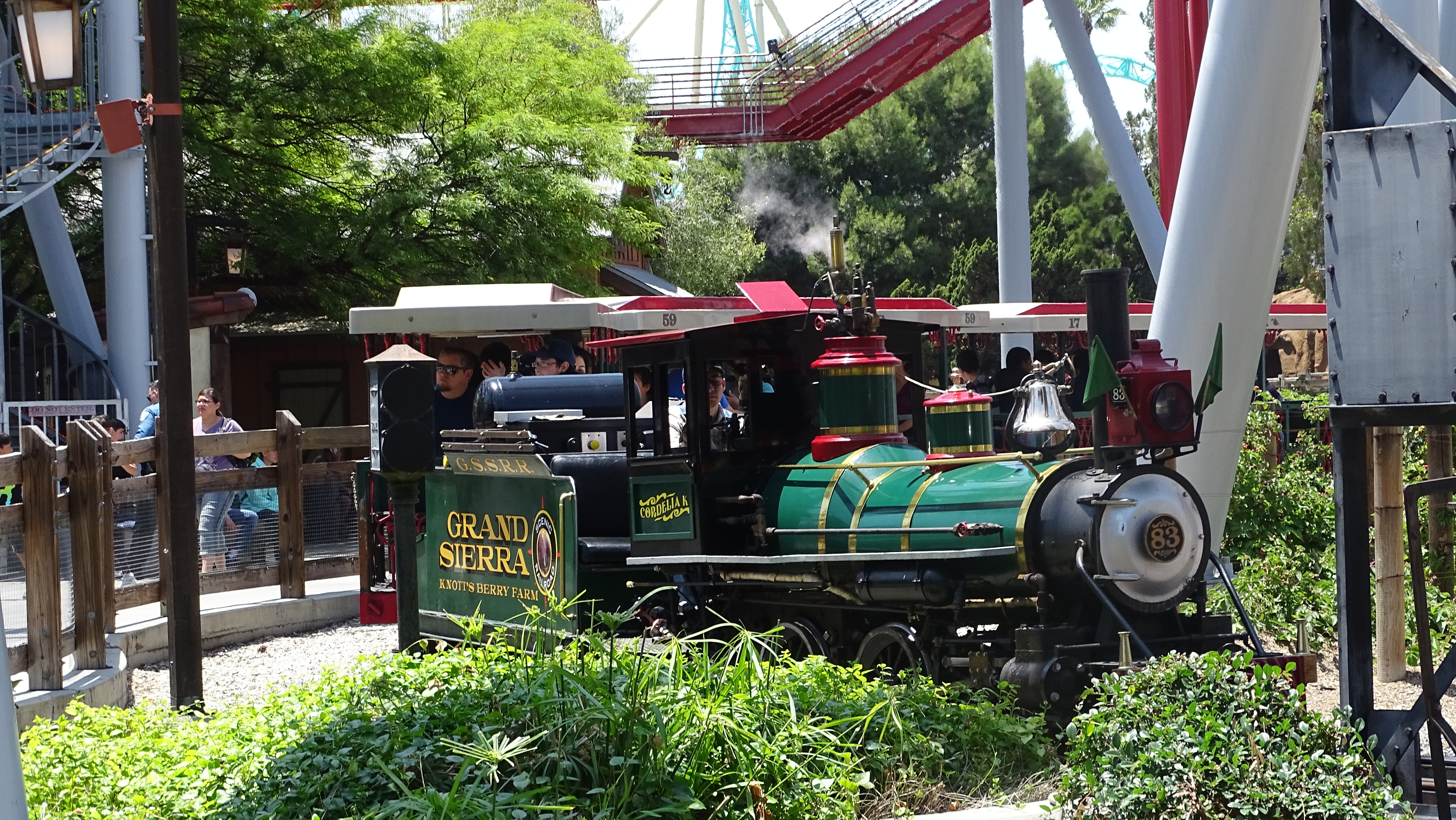
- The Beagle Express Railroad ride at Knott's Berry Farm, when it was known as the Grand Sierra Railroad. The train pictured, which was a 4-4-0 steam locomotive, has since been retired.

Overview
- Locale: Knott's Berry Farm
- Dates of operation: 1983–present

Technical
- Track gauge: 2 ft (610 mm)

The Beagle Express Railroad is a 2 ft miniatured themed Peanuts miniature railroad attraction located in the Camp Snoopy area of Knott's Berry Farm in Buena Park, California. Formerly known as the Grand Sierra Railroad, the four minute train ride transports guests on a journey around Reflection Lake and the surrounding Camp Snoopy and Fiesta Village. Riders must be 46 inches tall to ride by themselves, or no height restriction if accompanied by an adult.

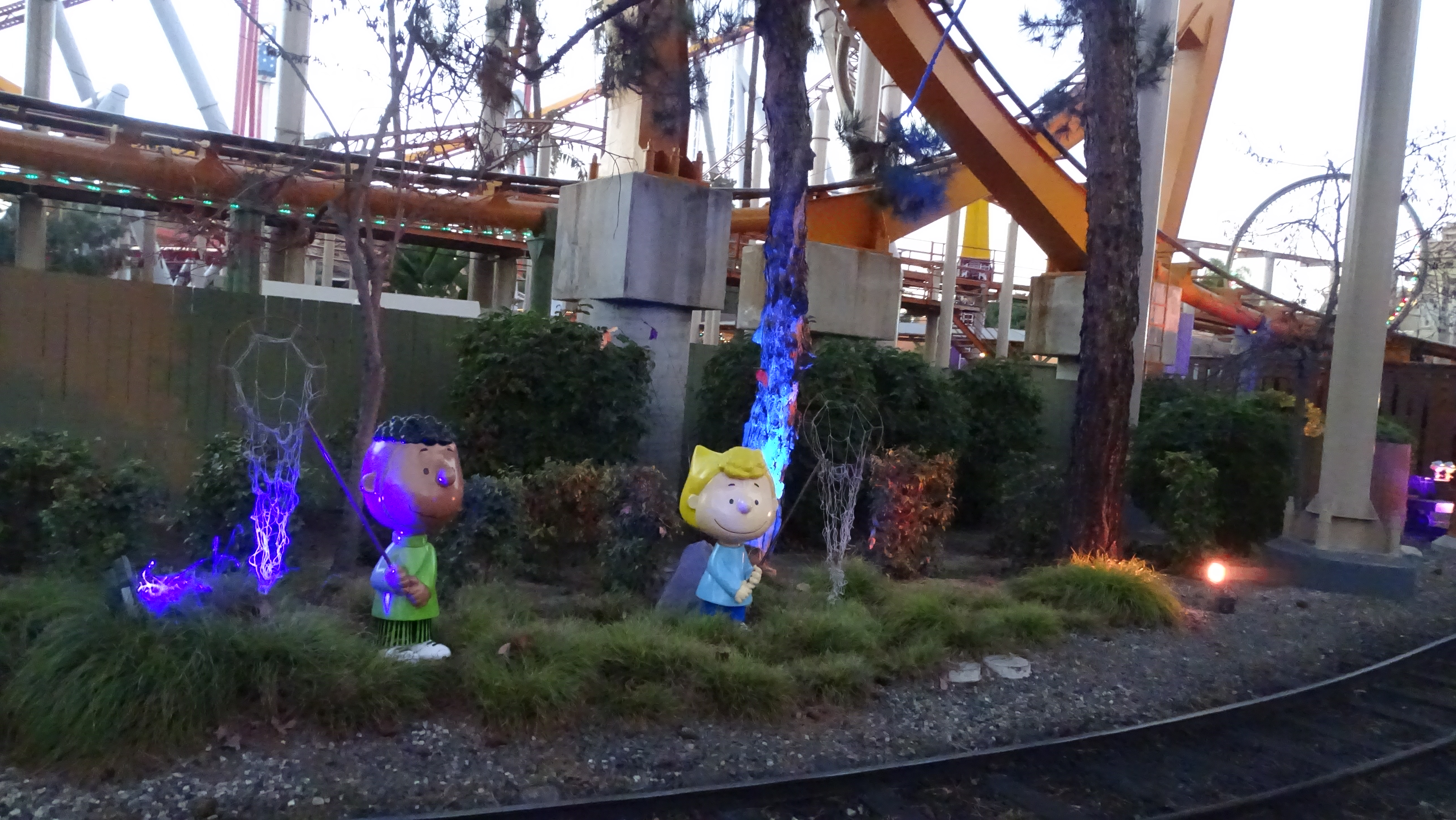
Beagle Express Railroad features Peanuts characters throughout the 4 minute ride.

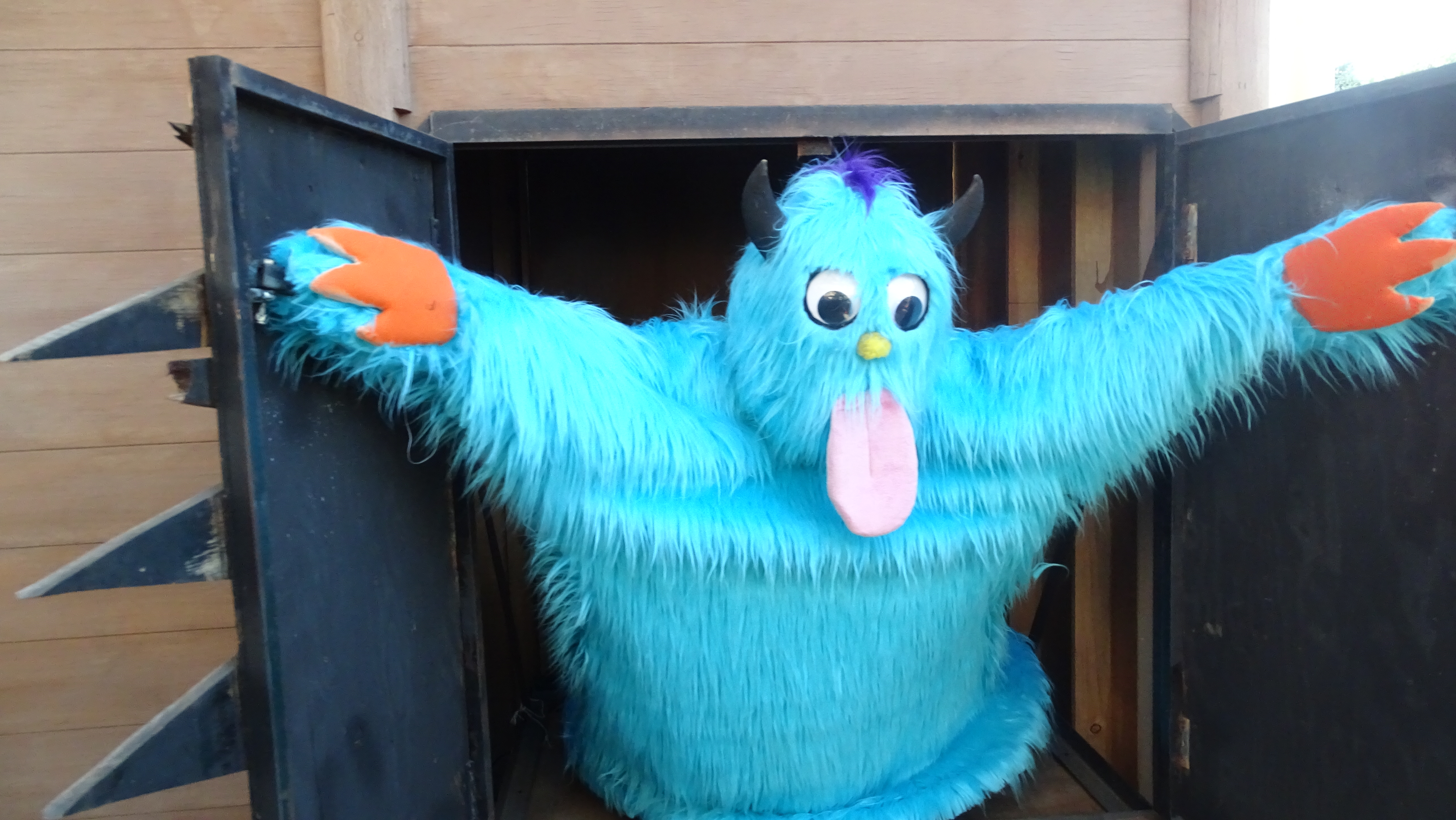
During Knott's Spooky Farm, the Beagle Express Railroad features a family friendly Halloween overlay.

== History ==
The ride opened in the 1983 season as part of the opening of Camp Snoopy. The train ride was previously longer prior to the opening of Silver Bullet. When Silver Bullet opened on December 7, 2004, the track layout of the Beagle Express Railroad was shortened in the Reflection Lake area.

Prior to the extensive refurbishment of Camp Snoopy, the Grand Sierra Railroad was not themed and was rather a basic train ride with views of Reflection Lake. A noticeable past feature of the Grand Sierra Railroad was the folding bridge over the lake. When the train ride was shortened, the Reflection Lake bridge no longer folded since water was no longer found underneath the bridge. Also, the Walter Knott steamboat was removed in 2004 as part of the construction for Silver Bullet. In early 2014, Knott's Berry Farm announced a makeover of Camp Snoopy for the 30th anniversary including an overlay for the Grand Sierra Railroad. Moreover, the ride reopened in the early summer 2014 season as part of the reopening of Camp Snoopy. The ride now features a great night light package featuring various Peanuts characters.

As part of a renovation, the original steam locomotive, which was built by Crown Metal Products, was retired in 2024 and replaced by a new electric locomotive.

== Ride ==
The Beagle Express Railroad station is located next to the Sierra Sidewinder roller coaster. Guests board a miniature steam locomotive train. As the train passes underneath the Balloon Race ride, guests encounter various small animatronic characters from the Peanuts universe. Snoopy, Linus, Sally, Woodstock and Charlie Brown are located throughout the 4 minute ride. During the middle of the ride, guests are given a great view of Reflection Lake where a small boat can be spotted featuring Charlie Brown and Sally.

== Gallery ==
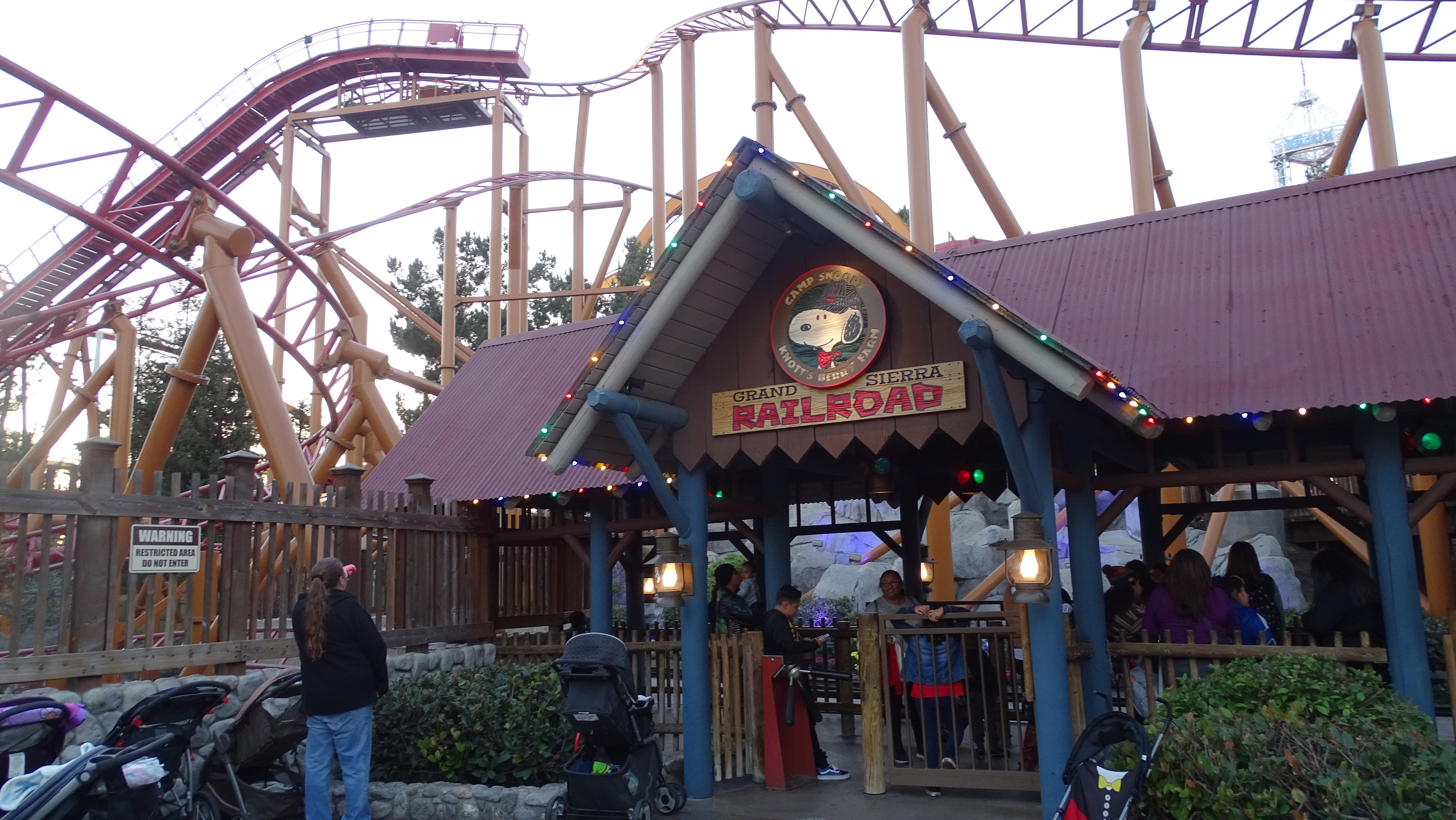
Grand Sierra Railroad station in Camp Snoopy.

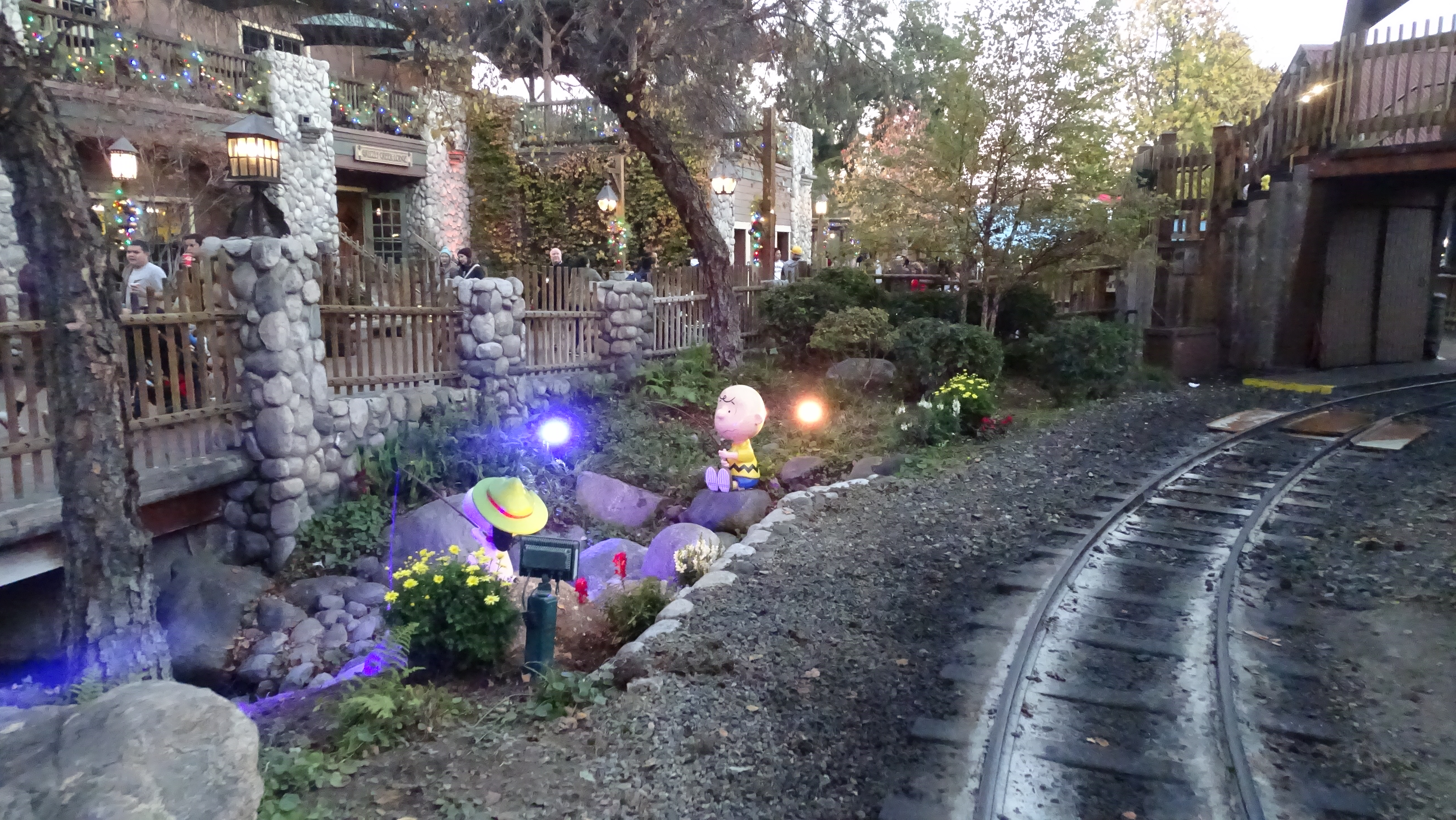
Grand Sierra Railroad features Peanuts characters throughout the 4 minute ride.

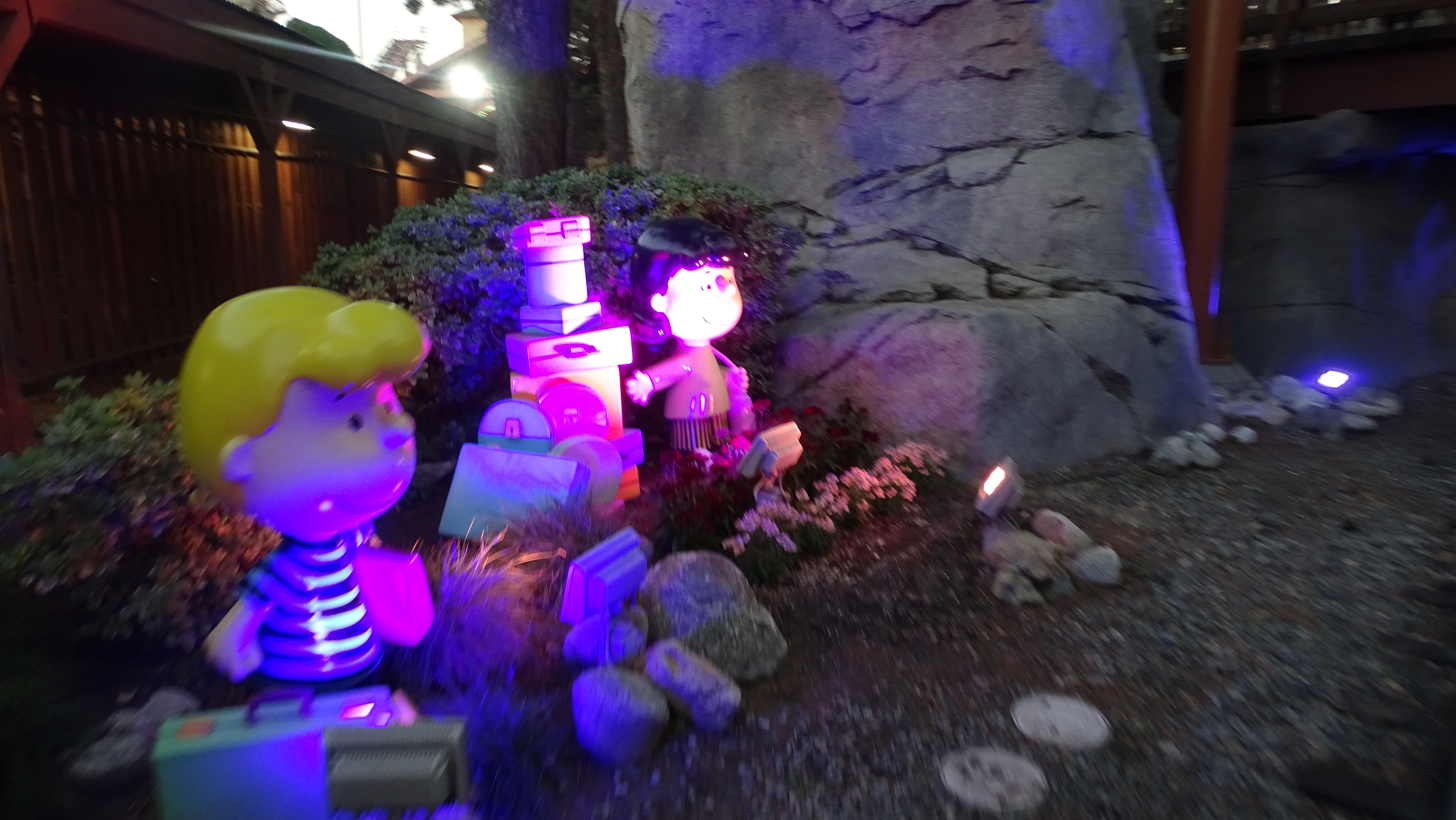
Peanuts characters viewed on a night ride.

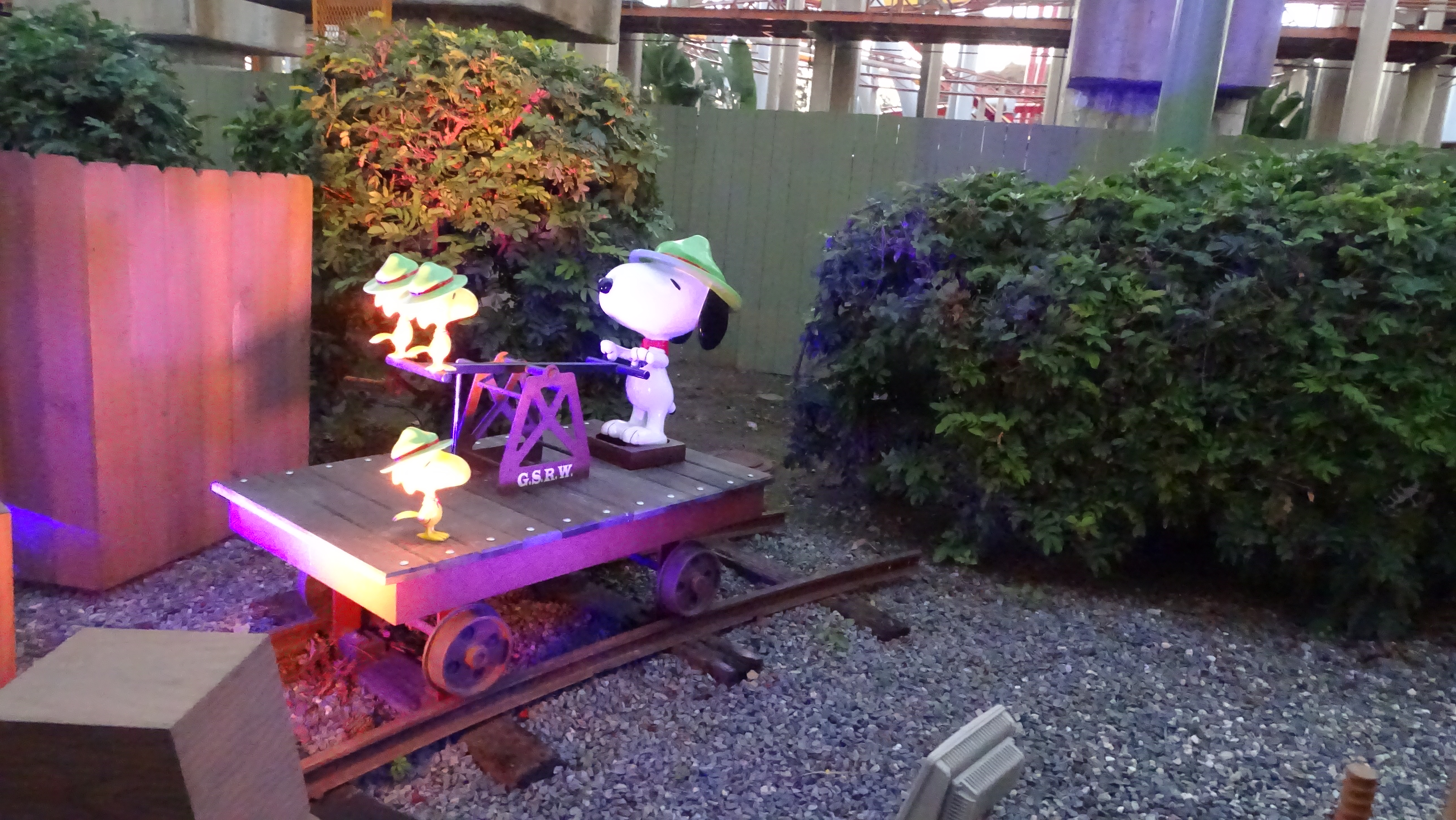
Snoopy and Woodstock on the Grand Sierra Railroad.

== See also ==
- Ghost Town & Calico Railroad - Knott's authentic larger train ride
