= Garner Holt =

American businessman

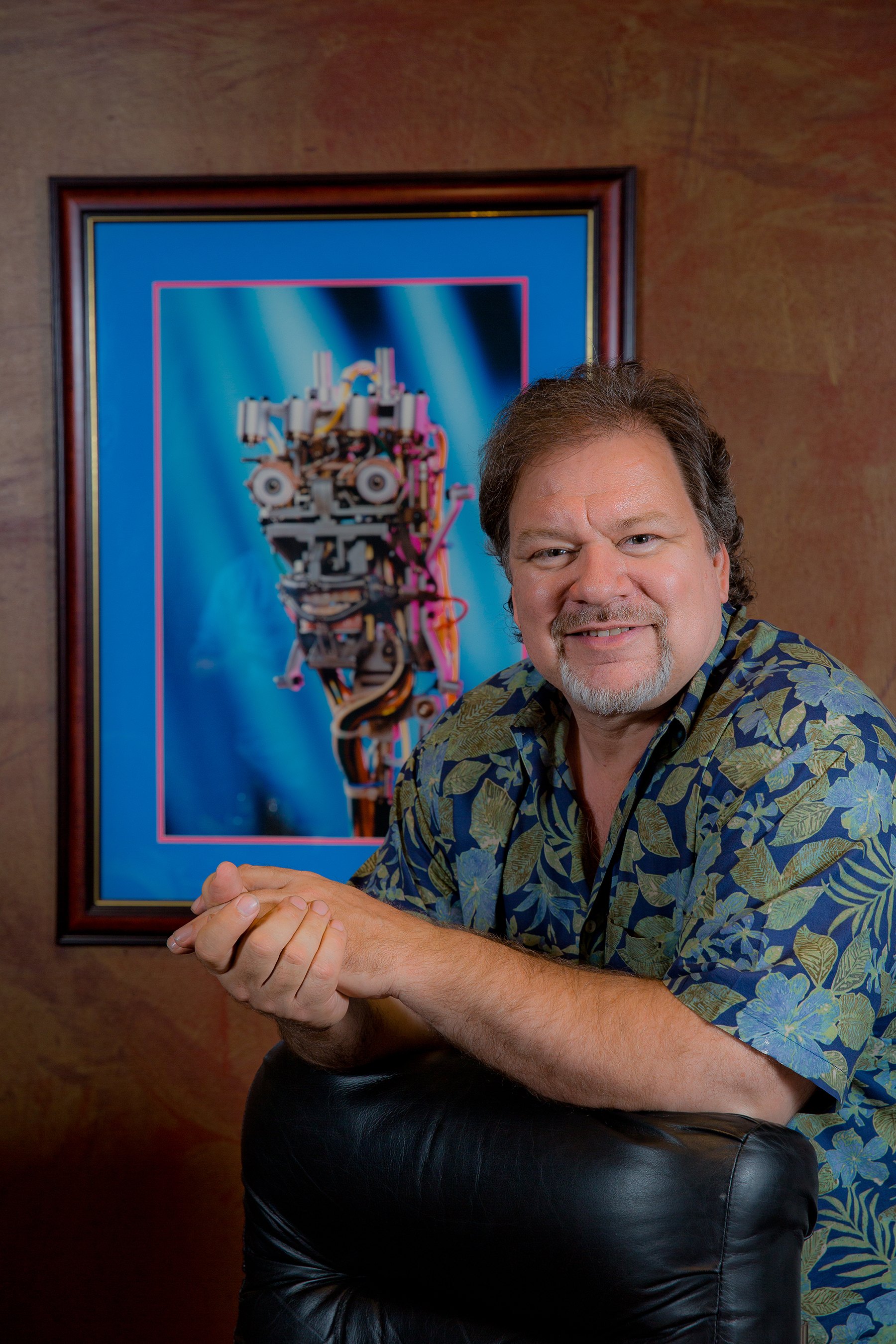
Garner Holt in 2017

Garner L. Holt is an American businessman. He is the founder and president of Garner Holt Productions, Inc., a designer and manufacturer of animatronic figures for entertainment locations, military training, and prosthetics. Garner is a native of San Bernardino, California.

Holt has received numerous awards for his entrepreneurial efforts as well as his company's creative achievements. His company has been honored with nearly two dozen of the Themed Entertainment Association's Thea Awards (including Holt's 2014 Harrison "Buzz" Price Award Recognizing a Lifetime of Achievements). In 2016 Holt received the Disneyana Fan Club's (DFC) Disney Legend Award.

Holt established his production facility in Redlands, California. In 2024, his foundation established "Garners Garage", a workshop to educate visitors on 20-30 types of jobs established in animatronics. The foundation also teaches students about STEM and STEAM careers.
