= Incidents at Six Flags parks =

This is a summary of notable incidents at the amusement parks and water parks that are operated by Six Flags Entertainment Corporation. In some cases, these incidents occurred while the park was under different management or ownership, such as legacy Cedar Fair parks.

This list is not intended to be a comprehensive list of every such event, but only those that have a significant impact on the parks or park operations, or are otherwise significantly noteworthy. The term incidents refers to major accidents, injuries, or deaths that occur at a park. While these incidents were required to be reported to regulatory authorities due to where they occurred, they usually fall into one of the following categories:

1. Caused by negligence on the part of the guest. This can be a refusal to follow specific ride safety instructions or deliberate intent to violate park rules.
2. The result of a guest's known, or unknown, health issues.
3. Negligence on the part of the park, either by ride operator or maintenance safety instructions, or deliberate intent to violate park rules.
4. Natural disaster or a generic accident (e.g., lightning strike, slipping and falling), that is not a direct result of an action on anybody's part.

== California's Great America ==
=== Breakers Bay ===
- On July 12, 2007, a 4-year-old boy drowned in a 2-foot (0.61 m) deep area of the wave pool (then called Great Barrier Reef). Lifeguards and emergency medical technicians tried to resuscitate him, but he was pronounced dead at a nearby hospital.

=== Demon ===
- On August 12, 1976, a roller coaster train on Turn of the Century (later renamed Demon) stopped automatically on the track using its braking system after a wheel assembly guide broke loose and fell to the ground. The event occurred seconds after exiting the ride's double corkscrew element, and the coaster, which was in its inaugural year, had experienced the problem twice in 9 days. None of its 24 passengers on board at the time were injured.

=== Drop Tower ===
- On August 22, 1999, a 12-year-old boy fell from the Drop Tower and died. His family claimed the shoulder harnesses were not locked properly. An investigation was inconclusive and no charges were filed.

=== Flight Deck ===
- On September 7, 1998, a 25-year-old man was struck by the dangling leg of a 28-year-old woman riding Flight Deck. It is alleged that the man, who was a native Spanish speaker, had difficulty understanding the park's English-language warning signs, and he entered the ride's restricted area to retrieve his hat. He was pronounced dead an hour later at Valley Medical Center. The woman riding suffered a broken leg.
- On June 12, 2015, a maintenance worker was critically injured after being struck in the head by a moving train on Flight Deck. A passenger sustained serious hand and leg injuries in the incident.

=== Halloween Haunt ===
- On October 28, 2017, police reported that they received multiple reports of 15-20 teenage boys assaulting and robbing park visitors. One person was arrested while others suffered minor injuries and some were taken to the hospital.
- On October 26, 2019, a group of teenagers sparked some firecrackers in the front gate causing guests to scramble, thinking it was a shooting. It was later determined to be due to a robbery. Concession stands within the park were also robbed by fleeing guests.

=== Independence Day ===
- On July 4, 2019, police were called near the entrance of the park where a woman was shot during the evening of the fireworks show. The victim was struck on the arm by a handgun. She did not suffer any serious injuries and was also treated at the scene. It was ruled as an altercation between two family groups.

=== Invertigo ===
- On August 10, 2009, 24 passengers on Invertigo were stuck on the ride 80 feet (24 m) up its lift hill after it malfunctioned. It took firefighters more than four hours to safely evacuate passengers down the staircase. No injuries were reported.

=== Logger's Run ===
- On July 4, 1989, two boys intentionally jumped out of the ride. One 9-year-old died and the other fell safely onto an emergency platform.

=== Rip Roaring Rapids ===
- In 1996, six people were injured when a raft on the Rip Roaring Rapids overturned.
- In 2005, a female park patron suffered broken ribs in an impact with the side of a seat after the raft came to a sudden stop.

=== Rue Le Dodge ===
- In 2005, a woman fractured her wrist while riding the bumper car ride with her son. Her lawsuit against the park was eventually lost in an appeal to the California Supreme Court, which ruled 6-1 in favor of California's Great America, stating that guests assume "an assumption of risk" when riding, similar to a sport activity.

=== Whizzer ===
- On March 29, 1980, a 13-year-old boy riding Whizzer was killed and eight other passengers were injured when two trains collided. The U.S. Consumer Product Safety Commission charged the park with not reporting a possible defect in the ride's braking system. Marriott Corporation settled the civil penalty action brought by the U.S. Consumer Product Safety Commission with a US$70,000 payment (equivalent to $274,000 in 2025). The Commission found that eleven other incidents happened on the ride between 1976 and 1979, resulting in an unknown number of injuries.

=== Yankee Clipper ===
- In 1991, two couples sustained injuries after their boat hydroplaned and capsized, temporarily trapping them under the overturned boat. A bump was later added to the bottom of Yankee Clipper's splashdown to prevent hydroplaning.

== Canada's Wonderland ==
- On May 11, 2003, two guests were involved in a fight over $10 worth of marijuana at the front gate of the park, which led to a shooting death. Metal detectors were added at the front gate, along with the implementation of bag checks for additional security following the incident.
- On October 26, 2014, two people were stabbed in the parking lot after the park had closed. One of the victims, a 21-year-old man, was pronounced dead at the scene. The other victim, an 18-year-old man, was taken to an area hospital with "life-threatening injuries" but was later released. Police arrested and charged an 18-year-old man in connection with the attack several weeks later. They believed the attack was part of a confrontation between two groups that began inside the park and escalated in the parking lot.
- On October 13, 2023, a police officer was patrolling the parking lot when he noticed a 17-year-old male behaving suspiciously and exited his vehicle. The teen then ran away from the officer and reached Jane Street between Norwood Avenue and Avro Road where he was fatally struck by a vehicle. He was rushed to the hospital in serious condition. He died six days later on October 19 due to his injuries. The province's police watchdog Special Investigations Unit (Ontario) was notified of the incident.
- On July 12, 2025, there was a report of a possible firearm seen at Leviathan. No firearm was found during the investigation and the park was slowly emptied after the incident.

=== Bat ===
- On July 20, 2004, at around 9 p.m., 20 people were stranded on the coaster 30 metres (98 f) above the ground for 20 minutes due to a malfunction.

=== Lumberjack ===
- On July 18, 2021, riders on Lumberjack were stranded upside down for 5 minutes due to a possible control malfunction. Nobody was injured. The ride reopened at 1:41 p.m. the same day.
- On September 23, 2023, during the park's Halloween Haunt event at approximately 10:40 p.m., riders on Lumberjack were stranded upside down for 25 minutes until the park's maintenance team brought it down by 11:05 p.m.

=== Splash Works ===
- On July 31, 2022, a small fire broke out at Splash Works shortly after a fireworks display destroying a section of the 'Super Soaker' water slide and a pump-house below it. Nobody was injured, but the water park remained closed the next day following the incident. It reopened one day later on August 2 with limited operations.

=== Swing of the Century ===
- On July 11, 2024, a 17-year-old girl fell from Swing of the Century while riding and was taken to a trauma center at a nearby hospital. The Wave Swinger model from Zierer reaches a maximum height of 42 feet (13 m), and the extent of the rider's injuries was not revealed.

=== Victoria Falls ===
- In 1988, an 18-year-old unauthorized swimmer drowned in the pond below the waterfall of Victoria Falls. After swimming for 10 minutes, he approached the falls to retrieve a frisbee. His brother attempted to help but was pulled underwater several times. Resuscitation efforts by park staff failed. Wonderland's Director of Engineering denied the pond had an undertow, but the incident was later blamed on a whirlpool effect created by the waterfall.

=== Woodstock Whirlybirds ===
- On August 23, 2003, the Jimmy Neutron Brainwasher (later renamed Woodstock Whirlybirds) had a single unit fall from its mounting spindle. Two children and their mother were sent to a hospital with broken bones and lacerations.

== Carowinds ==
- On June 9, 2016, a transformer exploded nearby, causing a park-wide power outage. Riders were stranded on various rides, including 17 on WindSeeker and an unspecified number on Thunder Striker and Fury 325. Some guests waited over an hour before being evacuated. No injuries were reported, and the park reopened the following day in limited capacity.
- On September 5, 2016, around the time the park was closing, police were notified that a 22-year-old man allegedly shot a 14-year-old boy in the bus parking lot. It was reported that the altercation began as an argument inside the park before escalating outside. The man was arrested by police, and the boy was rushed to a nearby hospital to treat life-threatening injuries.
- On August 7, 2023, multiple people assaulted a security guard who was attempting to escort a man out of the park. The man had reportedly become irate after employees told him he could not board a ride without a shirt on. As the security guard tried to escort the man, several of the man's friends and relatives assaulted the guard. The man and a 17-year-old were arrested at the scene and a 19-year-old man was arrested several days later. Police also sought the location of a woman believed to be involved.

=== Carolina Harbor ===
- On June 7, 1987, five people were arrested for allegedly shooting two people inside Carolina Harbor with an unregistered machine gun. A 16-year-old girl playing in the wave pool was killed after being shot by a large caliber bullet. The other victim was a 6-year-old girl who was shot in the abdomen but survived after hospitalization.
- On July 5, 1989, an 11-year-old boy drowned in the wave pool. Lifeguards pulled the unresponsive victim out of the water and unsuccessfully tried to resuscitate him. He was pronounced dead at Charlotte Memorial Hospital.

=== Copperhead Strike ===
- On August 18, 2019, a guest was taken to the hospital after injuring his hand while riding Copperhead Strike. The ride was shut down temporarily for investigation.

=== Drop Tower ===
- On May 17, 1996, one of the cars on Drop Tower failed to ascend to the top of the tower after the safety control system locked the brakes. Park maintenance was unable to manually release the braking system. Three riders were stranded 160 feet (49 m) in the air for nearly three hours before being rescued.

=== Fury 325 ===
- On June 30, 2023, a park guest reported that a support column on Fury 325 had suffered a crack that caused it to separate from the track. The ride was closed that day and remained closed while repairs were pursued. All trains and guests made it safely back to the station without injury or derailment. The ride has since reopened after the support column was replaced.

=== Hover & Dodge ===
- On June 4, 2018, a bumper car on the ride caught fire but was quickly extinguished by the ride attendant. There were no injuries. The ride passed inspection and resumed normal operation.

=== Mountain Gliders ===
- On July 11, 2021, an empty stroller remained in the ride's surrounding area and got caught between the ride's seats. Once the ride started moving, it was snagged and spun through the air until eventually being thrown off. The attendant maintaining the ride quickly pressed the emergency stop button. Once the issue was addressed, all passengers were safely evacuated from the attraction. There were no injuries and the ride continued to operate that same day.

=== Nighthawk ===
- On March 17, 2007, seven park employees sustained minor injuries during a test run of BORG Assimilator (later renamed Nighthawk) when the seats changed position during the ride. The ride operator accidentally pressed a button releasing the seat locking pins after the train departed, which were responsible for keeping the seats in a fixed position. The ride was later modified to disable the button while trains are in motion.

=== Rip Roarin' Rapids ===
- On May 8, 1982, eight people were injured when two boats jammed up, resulting in a collision with other boats moving down the ride. One was knocked over by a guardrail. All were treated for minor injuries.

=== Thunder Road ===
- On July 25, 1979, a malfunction brought a coaster train on Thunder Road to a sudden halt when the wheels became slightly dislodged. The train stopped abruptly on the tracks approximately 12 feet (3.7 m) above ground. A total of 27 passengers were lowered to the ground by a lift from the back of a truck. The coaster's track was damaged, but there were no injuries reported. A park spokesperson later referred to the incident as a "freak occurrence".
- On April 5, 1999, a roller coaster train failed to stop on the final brake run, leading to a collision with another train parked at the station. Seven of the 16 passengers involved were taken to a local hospital and treated for minor injuries.

=== WhiteWater Falls ===
- On September 16, 1987, during construction for the new water ride, a sewage pipe collapsed off its supports, trapping and killing a 49-year-old male construction worker underneath 2 feet of dirt inside a 10-foot trench for almost 25 minutes before his body was recovered. An autopsy conducted by the York County Coroner's Office revealed that the victim's pulse had stopped once his body was found, and he was pronounced dead due to suffocation.

=== WindSeeker ===
- On July 28, 2013, 65 passengers were stuck on Carowinds' WindSeeker for over an hour when a safety mechanism halted the ride.
- On April 11, 2015, a safety mechanism halted the ride, stranding 60 passengers 150 feet (46 m) in the air for approximately 15 minutes.
- On March 6, 2019, a third-party contractor critically injured a hand while inspecting the WindSeeker at Carowinds before its seasonal opening. He was treated at a nearby hospital.

== Cedar Point ==
=== Park-wide incidents ===
- On May 28, 2018, Cedar Point suffered a park-wide power failure, caused by a car hitting a nearby utility pole outside the park. Guests were stranded on multiple rides including Millennium Force in 90 °F (32 °C) heat, and it took up to two hours for power to be fully restored. No injuries were reported.

=== Blue Streak ===
- On the afternoon of August 24, 1980, five people were injured and treated for superficial injuries in a collision on Blue Streak. Park spokesmen said the incident occurred when an irate customer "interfered with a roller coaster operator", resulting in an incoming train colliding with a departing train.

=== Cedar Creek Mine Ride ===
- On May 24, 1984, a 5-year-old boy riding Cedar Creek Mine Ride suffered a fractured skull and bruises after falling from the train's front seat during its 30 feet (9 m) drop. The ride had a 48-inch height restriction when it opened in 1969, but this was later relaxed to 48 inches or accompanied by a parent, so the boy may have been too small to ride. The park reinstated the original 48-inch height restriction and added thicker lap bars after the incident.
- On July 30, 1988, injuries were reported after an empty train was released from the station and collided with a train full of passengers stuck on the coaster's second lift hill. Twelve people filed lawsuits against the park, eight of them passengers and four of them parents. On February 5, 1991, one of the plaintiffs was awarded $35,000 after the jury deliberated for about four hours. The victim suffered nerve, knee and back injuries.

=== Cedar Point and Lake Erie Railroad ===
- On June 28, 1970, a train bumped into another train at the main depot. Fourteen guests were treated at a local hospital for minor bruises, but none needed to be admitted.

=== Corkscrew ===
- On August 25, 1981, two people were injured on Corkscrew when one of the cars on a train suddenly disengaged.
- On August 29, 1999, during the time of its operation, the chain lift used on the ride broke with riders being stranded on one of the coaster's cars. Although none of those on board were seriously injured in the accident, four were taken to the park's first aid station as a precaution.

=== Disaster Transport ===
- On June 7, 1990, three people suffered injuries while riding Disaster Transport when a prop fell from the tracks onto them.

=== GateKeeper ===
- On July 13, 2013, a man riding GateKeeper was found unresponsive when one of the trains returned to the station. He was given CPR on-scene by Cedar Point police officers, then hospitalized at Firelands Regional Medical Center. A park spokesman said the man survived a medical condition unrelated to the ride, which reopened about six hours later after passing a mechanical inspection.
- On June 12, 2019, a strong gust of wind caused a train to stall and fail to return to the station. Safety mechanisms engaged, stopping the next train on the lift hill. All riders on both trains were evacuated safely.
- On June 12, 2021, one of the trains got stuck on the lift hill due to a broken chain.

=== Gemini ===
- On June 22, 1986, four people riding Gemini suffered injuries and were taken to a nearby hospital when two trains collided.

=== Guest altercations ===
- On May 26, 2026, an 18-year-old guest was arrested after pulling down a transgender woman's skirt and underwear from behind. The guest fled in the parking lot but was soon tased by police and transported to the Erie County jail, where he was booked on charges of public indecency, disorderly conduct, resisting arrest, and obstructing official business. He was released on 10% of an $8,000 bond, and was subsequently permanently banned from all Six Flags parks.

=== Magnum XL-200 ===
- On June 28, 1989, 33 passengers on Magnum XL-200 were rescued from a stuck train that stalled 80 feet (24 m) above ground due to a gust of wind.
- On May 26, 2007, a train moving at 10 mph (16 km/h) hit a parked train, causing minor damage to both and injuring at least three passengers. Two were treated on scene, and a third, who had an asthma attack, was taken to a local hospital. The ride returned to single-train service the next day. The park said the accident was caused by wet tracks from early morning condensation.

=== Mean Streak ===
- On August 1, 1992, a 20-year-old man injured one of his hands when it was caught between the coaster train and the loading platform as the ride was ending its run. He was taken to a nearby hospital where he underwent surgery for lacerations on his right wrist. The ride was temporarily shut down and reopened after inspections verified the coaster was operating properly.

=== Millennium Force ===
- On September 2, 2001, the cable used to haul trains up the lift of Millennium Force broke during a morning test run, resulting in the stranding of 30 park employees 275 feet (84 m) up the coaster's lift hill. There were no injuries, but the ride was temporarily closed for a week.
- On October 16, 2026, a small metal bracket became dislodged from a ride vehicle and fell into a guest area. No guests or employees were injured. The ride immediately closed down for an internal review and state inspection. The ride reopened later the following night on October 17, 2026.

=== Power Tower ===
- On August 10, 2025, a cable snapped on one of the towers, causing the car involved to stop midway through the ride. The ride was safely evacuated, manually bringing the car back to the ground. No injuries were reported. The ride reopened over a month later.

=== Raptor ===
- On June 21, 2015, a 37-year-old man injured his right leg when the gates in the ride's loading platform closed on him as he was boarding the ride. The incident resulted in a 4-inch-long gash (10 cm) on his lower-right leg, and he was taken to a nearby hospital where he received 11 stitches.
- On August 13, 2015, a 45-year-old man attempting to retrieve a dropped cell phone in the ride's restricted area was killed after being struck in the back of the head by a passing roller coaster train. Park emergency crews attempted to revive the man, but he was eventually pronounced dead on scene. The ride was temporarily closed for inspection and reopened the following day.

=== Scamper ===
- On June 29, 1963, a 17-year-old boy suffered fractures to his wrists while riding the coaster. He was treated at Good Samaritan Hospital.

=== Shoot the Rapids ===
- On July 19, 2013, a boat on Shoot the Rapids rolled back down the ride's lift hill and flipped over, injuring seven riders on board. Six were treated by park medical staff, and one was taken to a nearby hospital and later released. The ride was closed for the remainder of the 2013 season and reopened in 2014.

=== Skyhawk ===
- On July 26, 2014, a cable on Skyhawk for one of the carriages that attaches to the pendulum snapped, injuring two riders. One was treated on scene, while the other was taken to a local hospital and later released. Skyhawk reopened on August 1, 2014.

=== Snake River Falls ===
- On July 3, 2013, a boat on Snake River Falls failed to generate a splash at the bottom of its descent, causing it to become dislodged at the track's first turn. Cedar Point later determined that the water level was too low. No injuries were reported.

=== Space Spiral ===
- On May 18, 1985, ten people were stranded on Space Spiral for several hours inside its cab. The device responsible for raising and lowering the cab had partially failed, preventing the cab from returning to ground level. It had to be raised to the top of the tower, with its passengers being evacuated either by ladder or winch and harness.

=== Steel Vengeance ===
- On May 5, 2018, opening day for Steel Vengeance, a train returning to the station lightly bumped into another train that was parked in the station. Four riders were examined by the park's first aid team and released. The ride reopened later that day with only one train in operation. Normal operation resumed the following month.
- On July 21, 2018, a 17-year-old boy threw a packet of hot sauce at a train, which apparently exploded and hit some people in the face and eyes. The 17-year-old boy was charged with misdemeanor disorderly conduct. A Sandusky officer responded to a call from Cedar Point police at about 4:20 p.m. about riders being hit by hot sauce, according to a Sandusky police report. Seven Steel Vengeance riders were treated by Cedar Point EMS, the report states. One woman had to get her eyes flushed out after being exposed to the hot sauce. Seven people were treated at the park.
- On August 11, 2018, a tire from the drive system, located near the brake run, became detached and landed near the queue. The ride was evacuated and reopened later the same evening with no injuries reported.

=== Top Thrill Dragster ===
- On July 14, 2004, four people riding Top Thrill Dragster were struck by metal debris that sheared off the coaster's launch cable during launch. They were treated at the park's first aid station, and two sought further treatment at a nearby hospital. The metal pieces came from a cable that pulls trains on Top Thrill Dragster to speeds of 120 mph. The coaster train completed its route and was shut down for the evening.
- On August 7, 2016, a launch cable became detached on the ride. Two passengers were evaluated at the park's first aid station and later released, resuming their visit in the park. The ride remained closed through the next business day.
- On August 15, 2021, a guest waiting in line was struck in the head by a piece of metal after it became dislodged from the ride by a passing train that was nearing the end of its run. She was taken to a nearby hospital for treatment and then transferred to an intensive care unit, where it was determined that she had suffered a brain injury. The ride was shut down for the remainder of the 2021 season. The ride remained closed throughout the 2022 season and did not reopen. In September of that year, Cedar Point announced they were retiring the ride. The victim's family sued the park in 2023, but reached a settlement with confidential terms on April 13, 2024. The ride has reopened since 2024 as Top Thrill 2.

=== Valravn ===
- On June 26, 2019, two trains on Valravn suffered a minor collision in the station. Several riders were evaluated by the park's first aid staff, and no injuries were reported. The ride was temporarily closed for two weeks.

=== VertiGo ===
- On January 14, 2002, a 200-foot (61 m) portion of one of VertiGo's 265-foot (81 m) steel towers collapsed. It was later determined to be caused by the removal of the ride vehicle during off-season maintenance. When attached, the vehicle provided stabilization, preventing the towers from swaying past their 8-foot (2.4 m) sway allowance. On March 11, 2002, the park announced the removal of VertiGo rides from both Cedar Point and Knott's Berry Farm.

=== White Water Landing ===
- On July 20, 2002, two boats on White Water Landing became stuck at the bottom of the drop, and a third boat collided with them from behind. All six riders were examined at the hospital for minor injuries and released. The ride reopened the following day after an investigation.

=== WildCat ===
- On May 16, 2008, a car on WildCat rolled backward down the lift hill, colliding with another car. Ten riders suffered minor injuries. Inspections confirmed a suspected fault in the ride's anti-rollback system.
- On June 5, 2011, during the ride's last operating season, a car returning to the station collided with a stationary car. Seven riders suffered minor injuries, three of whom were evaluated at a nearby hospital.

== Dorney Park & Wildwater Kingdom ==
=== Ferris Wheel ===
- On July 11, 1940, a 9-year-old boy who was riding on the Ferris wheel fractured his skull after sticking his head out of an 8-inch opening at the top of the door which was bolted on the outside of a carriage he was sitting in. The child brought his head into contact with the framework of the wheel which then caused him to become severely injured when his head became stuck after coming too close. He was declared dead after being taken to Allentown Hospital.

=== Flying Dutchman ===
- On July 15, 1979, six people were injured after two coaster trains collided. Two out of the six passengers were hospitalized at Allentown and Sacred Heart Hospital Center. A park spokesperson claimed that the accident occurred due to a brake malfunction on one of the trains as it rear-ended another.
- In 1986, a 13-year-old girl suffered injuries to her chest and abdomen when the ride came to a complete halt.
- On August 26, 1986, one of the trains that two women were riding in collided with another due to a computer malfunction which caused the train to not stop at its brakes near the station after completing its run. Both riders sustained injuries in the accident and were taken to the hospital.

=== Halloween Haunt ===
- On January 31, 2019, a lawsuit was filed against the park when a mother claimed that her teenage daughter suffered injuries while visiting the park with her friends back in September 2017. One of the park employees dressed up as a ghost scared her by shouting loudly in her ear despite the girl and her friends pleading for employees not to scare them. She then fell to the ground and became injured afterwards. Her mother sought over $150,000 in damages from the park and its owner for her daughter's injuries.

=== Hercules ===
- On July 18, 1993, 15 passengers were injured when two trains collided on Hercules.

=== Journey to the Center of the Earth ===
- In 1982, one of the boats stopped at the bottom of its hill as another one collided into the back of it resulting in four people suffering injuries. A lawsuit was later filed on April 25, 1984, which claimed that a park employee saw that the first boat was stopped at a dangerous location and failed to press the emergency stop button before the second boat impacted.

=== Laser ===
- On May 10, 1986, a park attendant on Laser suffered injuries to his right foot after it was caught between the train and the loading platform.

=== The Monster ===
- On July 19, 1981, two girls narrowly avoided serious injury by deboarding the ride after one of its arms broke off and crashed to the ground. Both were taken to a nearby hospital after the accident. The ride was later repaired and put back in operation about a week later.

=== Scenic Railway ===
- On September 4, 1911, multiple passengers suffered minor injuries after two cars collided. The cars on the engine were badly damaged after their roofs collapsed while going through a tunnel.

=== Sky Ride ===
- On July 1, 1988, 19 passengers were evacuated off the ride by firefighters after being stranded for an hour when a car was bounced off the cable by a rowdy guest who was on board. There were no injuries, but witnesses claimed that the guest jumped from one of the lifts to the turnaround, which may have caused the pulleys to jump their main cable. The safety mechanism in turn engaged, stopping the ride.
- On August 12, 1995, 36 people were stranded on the ride in mid-air for nearly an hour after a malfunction abruptly stalled all 20 gondolas they were on.

=== Steel Force ===
- On June 22, 2019, a 31-year-old man allegedly punched a 14-year-old boy after an argument while waiting in line to ride Steel Force. He was arrested by the police and taken to the local county jail.

=== Stinger ===
- On May 2, 2014, two people were injured when Stinger rolled back into the station.

=== Thunder Creek Mountain ===
- On August 19, 1987, a woman suffered injuries as the log she was riding in along with her son collided when it suddenly stopped.
- On May 16, 2004, a log vehicle was stopped at the top of the lift hill, with other logs backing up behind it. Four riders received minor injuries while trying to escape and were taken to a nearby hospital as a precaution.

=== Thunder Creek Raceway ===
- In August 1990, a man suffered back injuries while riding in a go-kart. His vehicle was struck in the rear by another go-kart traveling behind.

=== Thunderhawk ===
- On July 24, 1926, Beatrice Lausterer of Allentown, Pennsylvania, a 16-year-old girl riding the Thunderhawk at Dorney Park died from injuries she sustained after falling from a coaster train.
- On July 21, 1990, two trains collided at the bottom of the lift hill. Seventeen people were checked in at local hospitals to receive treatment for minor injuries. Inspections on the ride could not identify any mechanical failures; the park's spokesperson said that operator error may have caused the accident. The ride was closed for the remainder of the day.

=== Wildwater Kingdom ===
- In June 1989, a woman claimed that she injured her right ankle while riding on the Riptide Run water slide. There were too many people riding down the slide and she was crushed against the side of the pool.
- On June 27, 1990, a girl was allegedly injured while riding in an inner tube on the Lightning Falls water slide. She was thrown from her tube after it collided with another that was stuck in a nearby tunnel. Her face struck the bottom and she lost one of her teeth and also suffered back, neck and head injuries.
- On June 16, 1994, a 14-year-old boy drowned in the wave pool. His body was found overnight by a construction worker after the park's closing. The incident occurred during a school field trip, and an investigation placed blame on six adults responsible for verifying swim capabilities of their students before releasing them in the water park. In addition, when the victim was reported as missing, an assistant principal failed to act accordingly. Dorney Park staff and lifeguards also received blame for a lackluster effort to find the missing child. In 2002, the victim's mother was awarded $10 million from Dorney Park and the New York City Department of Education after both were found negligent by a Bronx Supreme Court jury.
- On April 24, 2014, a 23-year-old worker had his foot crushed by a forklift during the construction of a new water slide complex attraction called Snake Pit. He was pulled in front of the moving forklift by a rope he was holding, which was attached to a suspended steel column. He suffered injuries to the foot and ankle, and his lower right leg was later amputated after infection set in. A lawsuit filed four years later on December 5, 2018, resulted in a $2.75 million settlement with the ride's manufacturer.

== Frontier City ==
=== Mystery River Log Flume ===
- On June 14, 2002, three people were injured on the ride when two boats bumped into each other. The three, all from Ada, Oklahoma, were taken to St. Anthony Hospital and treated in the emergency room. The Emergency Medical Systems Authority was called at about 9 p.m. to respond after the riders complained of back and neck injuries.
- On June 23, 2019, Marlena Perry suffered back injuries while riding on the log flume with her children. She slid backwards and hit a pole. A park spokesperson said that the ride's vehicle was already inspected and found to be operating normally.

=== Wildcat ===
- On June 21, 2019, two riders were injured when a falling tree branch toppled on top of them while on the coaster. One of them was taken to a nearby hospital while the other was treated for minor injuries. The ride remained closed following an investigation and was later reopened.
- On July 26, 2021, a man trespassed through a restricted area by climbing on the catwalk next to the wooden supports of the coaster's tracks to bring bottled water to passengers on board a train when it stalled on the lift hill. According to a statement provided by the park, his actions were unsafe and unwarranted and he and his family were escorted out of the park, with him being banned afterwards.

== Kings Dominion ==
- On April 18, 1995, five people were stabbed during a massive brawl inside the park. One victim was hospitalized and had surgery, while all of those injured were later reported to be in stable condition.
- On April 12, 2003, two men were shot, one of them critically, during a parking-lot altercation shortly after the sixth-annual Black Entertainment Television College Hip-Hop fest.

=== Dominator ===
- On July 20, 2012, a 48-year-old woman was found unresponsive in a car after the train returned to the unloading station on Dominator. She was reported to have had a "seizure-like episode" after her ride. She was taken to Memorial Regional Hospital in Mechanicsville, Virginia where she was pronounced dead. An autopsy discovered she had a brain aneurysm. The ride reopened on July 23, 2012, after passing two safety inspections.

=== Eiffel Tower ===
- On August 13, 1986, a 32-year-old man leapt to his death from a curved, 9-foot-high (2.7 m) restraining barrier on the tower's observation deck. The observation deck was enclosed after the incident to prevent future occurrences.

=== Flight of Fear ===
- On June 10, 1997, ten couples renewing their marriage got stuck on Flight of Fear for two hours.

=== Galaxi ===
- On September 10, 1983, a 13-year-old boy died after being found unconscious and slumped over in his seat after riding the coaster. A local coroner ruled the child's death accidental due to severe head injuries.

=== Shockwave ===
- On August 23, 1999, a 20-year-old man fell from his safety restraints to his death while riding Shockwave. An investigation discovered the restraints were working properly and still secured when the train returned to the station. No lawsuit was filed.
- On September 2, 1999, a 13-year-old boy claimed that he was not properly secured in his restraints as they became loose after intentionally slipping out of them when the coaster's train was going up the lift hill. He then escaped serious injury by jumping out of the train onto a nearby catwalk on the side of its tracks.

=== Snoopy Space Buggies ===
- On July 21, 2023, a child was attempting to exit their Space Buggies car prematurely, resulting in an injury. Park officials did not provide information about the extent of the child's injuries. Their First Aid team immediately responded and treated the child at the scene. The family chose to seek further evaluation at a local hospital.

=== Tornado ===
- On July 4, 2017, a woman suffered major injuries and a concussion on the Tornado water slide after the raft she was riding in flipped over. The ride closed shortly after this incident.

=== Twisted Timbers ===
- On June 10, 2018, a woman was hit in the forehead by a cellphone while riding Twisted Timbers. She was later taken to Johnston-Willis Hospital and received three stitches. Sometime later following the incident, multiple signs were put up around the entrance of the roller coaster saying that guests were forbidden from bringing cellphones on the ride.

=== Volcano: The Blast Coaster ===
- On June 23, 2006, debris went flying during a launch on Volcano: The Blast Coaster, cutting a man's leg. An investigation discovered a loose bolt had become lodged in the linear induction motor magnets used to launch the train.

=== White Water Canyon ===
- On August 7, 1990, a boat on the White Water Canyon Rapids ride flipped over, injuring three, when one boat caught up with another near the ride's midpoint. It was ruled as a "freak occurrence."

== Kings Island ==
- On August 5, 1989, a 39-year-old musician was killed in the employee parking lot when they were struck by lightning.
- On July 20, 2020, a 33-year-old man allegedly stole his grandmother's vehicle and led police on a high-speed chase before crashing outside the park on Interstate 71. The man then fled the scene on foot and entered the park illegally via a service road, triggering a park-wide lockdown.

=== Adventure Express ===
- On November 1, 2021, a woman filed a lawsuit against the park and its owners after she suffered serious injuries which eventually caused her to become permanently disabled from riding Adventure Express. According to the suit, she stated that the coaster was violent and rough during the time of her being on the ride two years prior in October 2019. Her attorneys alleged that the owners failed to safely maintain the ride to make sure that it was running properly within the usual standards and failed to inspect it to the Occupational Safety and Health Administration (OSHA). She is currently seeking $25,000 for negligence and punitive damages in the case.

=== Adventure Port area ===
- On June 9, 1991, a 20-year-old park security guard Darrell Robertson from Hamilton and a 21-year-old guest, William "Eddie" Haithcoat Jr. of Oakley who were trying to help another guest, 22-year-old Timothy Binning of Mariemont, who had fallen into a pond, were electrocuted by an underwater circulation pump. Investigators determined the pump lacked a ground-fault circuit breaker and fined Kings Island $23,500. Robertson and Haithcoat both died while Binning survived with burns on his arm and neck.

=== Banshee ===
- On June 19, 2024, around 8 pm, a 38-year-old man from Wilmington, Ohio attending with his family was struck and killed by the ride while it was traveling at 68 mph (109 km/h). He attempted to retrieve his keys by entering a restricted area while the ride was in motion. He was transferred to UC West Chester via AirCare, and later was transferred to University of Cincinnati Medical Center, though he died two days later on June 21, 2024.

=== Eiffel Tower ===
- On May 13, 1983, a 17-year-old boy attending a graduation party with his classmates fell approximately 200 feet (61 m) to his death down the elevator shaft of the Eiffel Tower. He had climbed a large fence onto an emergency stairwell and then into the shaft for an unknown reason. He was struck by the elevator's counterweight and became tangled in the cables, then fell when the elevator at the bottom started back up again.

=== Firehawk ===
- On August 8, 2009, a 38-year-old man appeared to have trouble breathing after the train he was riding on Firehawk returned to the station. He later died from natural causes at a nearby hospital. According to the Hamilton County Coroner's Office, the victim had a pre-existing heart condition and was recovering from a severe case of the flu and a respiratory infection at the time of his ride. The coaster reopened the following day after an inspection found the ride to be operating normally.

=== Flight Commander ===
- On June 9, 1991, an intoxicated 32-year-old woman Candy Taylor from Toledo fell 60 feet (18 m) from the ride and was pronounced dead at a nearby hospital. She had a blood-alcohol content of 0.30%. State investigators discovered a design flaw in the restraints that allowed limp patrons to slip out of their harness and slide to the unoccupied, adjacent seat. This accident occurred about an hour after two men were electrocuted and died in the Adventure Port area on the same day.

=== Flight of Fear ===
- On February 1, 1996, a 20-year-old male construction worker working on the roof of the Flight of Fear building fell 110 feet (34 m) to the ground. He suffered two broken legs and a broken pelvis.
- On June 2, 2014, smoke from an overheated electrical motor filled the attraction building. Two people were treated at the scene for smoke inhalation. Approximately 2 weeks later, an external electrical panel overheated and began smoking, but it did not cause any injuries.

=== King Cobra ===
- On August 8, 1984, eight people riding King Cobra were injured after the rear car suddenly stopped due to a broken wheel spindle.
- On July 19, 1990, an 18-year-old park employee was severely injured and placed in intensive care after getting struck by the wheel housing of a passing car. He was standing adjacent to the track, searching for a guest's lost article.

=== Lion Country Safari ===
- In April 1976, the wildlife preserve introduced 50 baboons into its Lion Country Safari attraction. On April 14, 1976, the entire troop escaped their enclosure and eluded capture, causing local concern and significant national news coverage. They roamed different areas of Warren County, Ohio, for a week until all were captured.
- On July 24, 1976, a lion mauled a 20-year-old park employee to death. His body was found 15 to 20 feet (4.5 to 6 m) from his vehicle in a section of the park's 100-acre wildlife preserve where about 50 lions lived. The ranger had a history of violating park rules. Investigators believed the ranger left the vehicle to relieve himself.
- On May 26, 1982, a lion attacked a 34-year-old park employee who was cleaning in the area. After climbing to a rooftop, he was rescued and taken to Bethesda North Hospital where he was treated for a punctured trachea and other cuts.

=== Skylab ===
- On August 9, 1990, the ride stopped abruptly mid-ride due to an electrical shortage, slightly injuring 19 people on board. A backup electrical system was installed to prevent future occurrences.

=== Skyride ===
- On April 24, 1977, a malfunction due to a storm and high winds stranded 27 people on board the gondolas, 95 feet (29 m) in the air. No riders were injured, but six were taken to a local hospital for evaluation.

=== Sling Shot ===
- On August 1, 2004, a park spokesperson claimed that two teenage boys suffered pain and discomfort after riding Sling Shot and were taken to a nearby hospital for evaluation. The ride closed temporarily pending an inspection.

=== Son of Beast ===
- On June 24, 2000, passengers on Son of Beast had to be evacuated and led down a staircase after its electrical sensor malfunctioned, causing the train they were riding to suddenly stop on the tracks before finishing its run.
- On July 9, 2006, a vertical support timber cracked, leading to two more support beam failures. This caused a slight dip in the track, creating a jarring pothole effect that injured 27 riders as they passed over. Most of the injured were released from a nearby hospital later that day, while two were kept overnight. None of the injuries were life-threatening. The ride reopened on July 4, 2007, with various changes. The loop was removed to allow for lighter trains and a smoother ride, according to park officials.
- In 2007, a man with a pre-existing medical condition was taken to the hospital after riding and died the next day. There was no evidence of malfunction and the incident was deemed accidental.
- On June 16, 2009, a 39-year-old woman reported a head injury after riding on May 31. After a CT scan found a damaged blood vessel, she was transferred to the local hospital's intensive care unit and released the next day. The ride was closed indefinitely, while a state investigation determined it had no irregularities. The ride never reopened and was demolished in July 2012.

=== The Bat (1993) ===
- On July 16, 2002, a park spokesperson claimed that one of the employees had left their vehicle nearby on an open path next to the coaster, which caused one of the trains to collide with it during a routine test run of The Bat, known as Top Gun at the time. There were no injuries, but the seats were severely damaged. The ride reopened two days later with only one train running.
- On July 26, 2003, a 34-year-old woman suffered a heart attack while riding the coaster. She was rushed to a nearby hospital and died the following day. A preliminary autopsy report found that she had an enlarged heart pre-existing condition.
- On June 22, 2022, a wheel came loose while the ride was in motion. Everyone on the ride was evacuated safely by park employees; no injuries were reported.

=== The Beast ===
- In September 1985, The Beast's structure was damaged by a grass fire, and 16 people suffered minor injuries.
- On October 14, 2001, twenty people were sent to the hospital after two trains collided on a rainy day.

== Knott's Berry Farm ==
- On July 9, 2021, police responded to a shooting located outside the park. There was no active shooter when they arrived. At least two were wounded from gunfire, and three others were reportedly hospitalized for other injuries.
- On July 16, 2022, police responded to numerous calls from park guests reporting gunshots from inside the park. Upon arrival, it was determined there were no gunshots, but multiple fights had broken out across the park, causing panic. The park was closed and evacuated three hours early and a chaperone policy for anyone under 15 years of age was instituted shortly thereafter.

=== Boomerang ===
- On June 1, 2001, the train became stuck in the cobra roll, and riders evacuated using the emergency staircase.

=== Butterfield Stagecoach ===
- In November 1983, a 4-year-old boy suffered severe injuries after being run over by the stagecoach's left rear wheel. The child was visiting the park during the week of Thanksgiving. A lawsuit was filed claiming negligence of the park for its loading procedure and for failing to add a barrier that would prevent small children from walking underneath the stagecoach.
- On August 20, 2003, the stagecoach lost control and crashed into a nearby fence, leaving one horse dead and another needing stitches. Two passengers and a park employee were treated at a local hospital for minor injuries.
- On December 30, 2012, a stagecoach tipped and fell to its side after its left rear wheel fell off. Three of the fourteen passengers were treated at a nearby hospital for minor injuries.

=== Calico Mine Ride ===
- On July 29, 2022, a train derailed while guests were riding it. The incident took place around 3 p.m. There were no reported injuries from the incident.

=== Calico Railroad ===
- On October 20, 1996, an employee was killed after being crushed between two of the ride's cars while trying to separate them.
- On January 27, 2001, an employee was trapped under a locomotive and his legs were seriously injured.

=== Calico River Rapids ===
- In June 1996, a 36-year-old woman fell from the ride and sustained several injuries, including a fractured rib and bruises. Although she later admitted she had stood up during the ride, she was still awarded $69,000 during a court case.

=== Calico Square ===
- On August 21, 1994, a stuntman was airlifted to UCI Medical Center after being critically injured while performing a show in a certain area inside the park.

=== Coast Rider ===
- On June 15, 2014, a 10-year-old boy was injured on Coast Rider when his left leg and foot were wedged between one of the trains as he was exiting. The train he was riding was completely stopped at the station. He was a wheelchair user for nearly three months following the incident. A lawsuit was filed against the park in March 2016 for his injuries.

=== GhostRider ===
- On August 25, 1999, five people sustained injuries on GhostRider after being struck by a piece of wood while riding.

=== Hammerhead ===
- On May 30, 1996, a portion of the ride's exterior was slightly damaged after a ride operator accidentally forgot to close the safety gate near the passenger loading area when it was in operation. Nobody was injured and park officials temporarily shut down the ride the following day.

=== Jaguar! ===
- On September 23, 2000, one of the trains on Jaguar! valleyed when a jacket wedged underneath the tracks, stranding 24 riders 30 feet (9.1 m) above ground for two hours.

=== Montezooma's Revenge ===
- On September 1, 2001, a 20-year-old woman died from a ruptured cerebral artery a day after riding Montezooma's Revenge. The ride was closed for several days pending an investigation. An autopsy revealed the woman had a pre-existing condition, and state investigators concluded the ride did not contribute to her death. Her family filed a wrongful death lawsuit in 2002, but it was dismissed in 2006.

=== Perilous Plunge ===
- On September 21, 2001, a 40-year-old woman fell out of Perilous Plunge during the drop sequence and died of multiple injuries sustained from blunt force trauma. California Division of Occupational Safety and Health officials stated the woman slipped through the ride's restraint system, falling into a pool at the base of the structure. Her seat belt and lap bar were closed and locked when the boat returned to the station.

=== Pony Express ===
- On October 7, 2010, the launch system of Pony Express failed to propel a train over the first hill and rolled back into the station, colliding with another train and causing minor injuries to ten people. An investigation discovered that paint on the brake fins impaired the braking system. The investigation also revealed a lack of proper testing procedures by the park to anticipate failed launches and rollbacks.

=== Sky Jump ===
- On October 30, 1983, an 18-year-old man fell 200 feet (61 m) to his death after climbing over the safety rail of the gondola he was riding in during the annual Knott's Scary Farm event. The incident was the first death in Knott's history. Details surrounding the incident indicated the man may have committed suicide, and the park claimed the ride was operating normally.

=== Sol Spin ===
- On November 18, 2024, 22 riders were stranded for over two hours when the Sol Spin ride malfunctioned and stopped mid-cycle. Park mechanics were eventually able to safely evacuate all of the riders.

=== Supreme Scream ===
- On July 17, 2021, a man climbed to the top of the Supreme Scream tower, prompting the temporary closure of most of the park's attractions and surrounding streets. He stood atop the structure for an hour before safely coming down on his own. He was taken to a local hospital for evaluation before being put into police custody.

=== Tampico Tumbler ===
- On July 15, 1993, a 34-year-old mentally disabled woman suffered severe head and internal injuries after falling 15 to 20 feet (4.6 to 6.1 m) from the spinning gondola ride to the ground. She was hospitalized in critical condition, and an investigation determined that the woman managed to climb out of her lap bar while the ride was still in motion. Tampico Tumbler was temporarily shut down for inspection and later reopened the same evening.

=== Timber Mountain Log Ride ===
- On July 27, 2014, a 6-year-old girl was riding Timber Mountain Log Ride with her father when her face smacked into the back of the seat in front of her, causing a loss of consciousness and lingering vision problems. A lawsuit was filed in May 2015.
- In 2016, a 6-year-old boy became injured when he fractured his eye socket while riding. His face smacked into the back of the seat in front of his position. A lawsuit was filed in August 2017.

=== Xcelerator ===
- On September 16, 2009, a launch cable snapped on Xcelerator, lacerating a 12-year-old boy's leg and injuring his father's back.

== Six Flags Darien Lake ==
- On July 26, 1987, a lightning strike killed three campers sleeping in tents on the campground.
- On September 6, 2009, the body of a Pennsylvania man, William Sutherland, was found in one of the small lakes at the park. Sutherland had been reported missing the previous night after attending a concert at the park. The cause of his death was not determined, but it "[did] not appear to be suspicious."

=== Ride of Steel ===
- On May 16, 1999, 37-year-old Michael Dwaileebe from Olean, New York, who weighed in at 365 lbs (165 kgs), was unable to secure his lap bar properly, and was ejected, falling approximately 9 feet (3 m) from the Ride of Steel roller coaster as the ride traversed one of its final airtime hills, causing him serious injuries. The victim sued the park and the ride's manufacturer, Intamin Amusement Rides, for negligence, and was awarded US$3.95 million following a court case.
- On July 8, 2011, 29-year-old James Hackemer fell to his death from the coaster. The rider, an Iraq War veteran whose legs had been amputated, was thrown from the train as it traversed an airtime hill. The accident was attributed to operator error, as the operators should not have allowed him to ride, because the restraints required passengers to have both legs restrained safely. Witnesses reported seeing the man let go of the restraint to reach for his hat that had flown off his head before he was ejected, and evidence suggested that he died instantly from blunt force trauma to the head when he came into contact with the front of a ride car. Following this incident, the ride temporarily ceased operation for two weeks before reopening again on July 22.

=== Silver Bullet ===
- On September 30, 2017, several guests on the Silver Bullet Swing Around ride suffered injuries as the ride came to a stop. The exact cause is unknown, though a park spokesperson said it was not due to a ride malfunction.

=== The Predator ===
- On October 5, 2019, 36-year-old Adam Cassel of Livonia, Michigan allegedly suffered shoulder and spinal injuries while riding the coaster when his seat's headrest broke during the ride. The victim claimed the headrest was partially broken before he boarded the train and that the attendants failed to notice and close off the seat.

== Six Flags Discovery Kingdom ==
=== Animal attacks and deaths ===
- On January 5, 1996, two trainers were injured by cougars during an exercise session. One trainer was in the cougar enclosure to take one of the animals for a walk. The cougars, Zuni and Tonto, had been playing among themselves and began aggressively playing with him, causing severe cuts on his face and upper torso. The backup trainer suffered minor cuts and bruises in his attempt to free the other.
- On July 31, 1998, Kuma, a two-year-old Bengal tiger, attacked and seriously injured 46-year-old Jaunell Waldo from San Jose, California, and slightly injured trainer Chad Zierenberg. The incident happened in a secluded area of the park set up to do private photo sessions with the big cats. The tiger was apparently startled when Waldo fell off the photo platform and landed on top of her. Zierenberg suffered a clawing while trying to free Waldo, who had received serious injuries to her head and upper torso.
- On June 2, 2004, a 23-year-old African elephant named Misha gored her trainer with her tusks while in her enclosure as the trainer walked beside her. This was Misha's second aggressive act following a previous swipe at a trainer two years prior.
- On September 5, 2007, a two-year-old giraffe died after a fire broke out overnight and its enclosure was destroyed. The animal was accompanied by two more who escaped. Investigators believed the fire was caused by an electrical short.

=== Batman Water Thrill Spectacular Show ===
- On June 6, 1999, a 38-year-old stuntman was injured while performing, after being thrown off a jet ski and being hit on the head by another one that was coming towards him. He was taken to John Muir Medical Center by helicopter for treatment of a small cut to his head.

=== Boomerang ===
- On August 25, 1999, 28 passengers were stranded on the Boomerang ride for several hours. After the train was pulled out of the station, the pull truck failed to release the train and it stopped on the initial incline for about ten minutes. While operators were attempting to restart the ride, the cable that pulled the train out of the station and was holding it on the hill snapped. The train proceeded through the station and into the first element with the pull truck and part of the cable still attached. Due to the extra weight and the fact that the pull truck was not designed to negotiate turns, the train came to a halt in the boomerang element. Riders, suffering from cases of severe dehydration and sunburn, were rescued and treated by firefighters in an aerial fire apparatus.

=== Monkey Business ===
- On July 21, 2001, a 42-year-old woman suffered a brain hemorrhage after riding the attraction. She was treated by the park's medical staff, taken to Kaiser Hospital and died two days later from her injuries. An autopsy wasn't performed to determine the exact cause of her death. State investigators temporarily shut down the ride, but later reopened it after no mechanical problems were reported.

=== Other incidents involving guests ===
- On July 3, 2010, one of the parking lot trams hit a swinging metal gate after someone accidentally pushed it which resulted in three people becoming injured at the scene. A 34-year-old man and his 2-year-old son were both taken to the hospital while another suffered minor injuries.
- On August 25, 2018, a fight broke out inside the park between five people, all of whom were arrested for causing a disturbance. A police officer suffered minor injuries.

=== Scat-a-bout ===
- On September 4, 1999, a nine-year-old boy was injured when he slipped below the restraining bar on the Scat-a-bout, a scrambler ride. The boy was thrown from the ride and landed in a nearby planter, receiving cuts on his legs. The park later stated that the accident was the result of the boy intentionally sliding beneath the safety restraint.

=== Starfish ===
- On May 12, 2001, 41-year-old Silvia Zavala from Antioch, California was thrown from the ride when a restraining bar failed as a result of a pneumatic valve being incorrectly installed. She landed on the pavement and suffered head and knee injuries. Her later lawsuit named both the park and the ride manufacturer Chance Rides as responsible parties.
- On June 8, 2002, a 4-year-old girl was critically injured when she slipped beneath the restraining bar and fell from the Starfish ride while riding with her mother, receiving critical head injuries. Investigators later blamed park employees for incorrectly seating the girl and not having proper signage indicating the proper seating arrangement for a larger and smaller rider.

== Six Flags Fiesta Texas ==
=== Other incidents involving guests ===
- On July 8, 2000, seven people were injured after a chlorine spill. They were all taken to local hospitals and released without any serious injuries.
- On July 11, 2007, 37-year-old Quan Tran was charged with improper photography and recording after allegedly acting suspiciously with a video camera by secretly filming young girls in the water park section. Authorities were notified and responded after employees had caught him in the act. Reports have said he was trying to film someone without permission in an attempt to arouse or gratify the sexual desire of a person.

=== Poltergeist ===
- On June 12, 2007, 14-year-old Hailey Kuhn was paralyzed after she fell into a gap between the roller coaster's cars, landing on a concrete floor about 10 feet (3 m) below the platform. Family members stated that she may have fainted due to the heat of the day.

== Six Flags Great Adventure ==
=== El Diablo ===
- On September 13, 2015, a female rider was injured when her safety restraints came undone as the ride started. As she exited the ride, it was shut down for technical difficulties. Two years later in 2017, her family filed a lawsuit against the park claiming that the staff did not check them before they were secured.

=== El Toro ===
- On August 19, 2016, a woman was injured after being struck in the face by an unknown object while riding the coaster. She was treated by the park medical staff before being taken to a local hospital for further evaluation. The attraction reopened the next day after park officials fully inspected the ride to make sure that it was running safely.
- On June 29, 2021, a train partially derailed when the rear car's up-stop wheels, which are designed to prevent the train from lifting off the track, moved out of place and up onto the track. The train came to a stop just short of the final brake run, where the riders were safely evacuated. No one was injured in the accident. The cause of the accident was not immediately clear, and the ride remained closed pending the outcome of an investigation. The ride reopened on April 2, 2022, opening day of the 2022 season.
- On August 25, 2022, 15 riders reported back pain and other minor injuries after riding the coaster. Of these, 5 were hospitalized and all 5 were released shortly after. Those injured complained of increased roughness at the bottom of the third drop - the ride completed its cycle and was closed for inspection. In a statement, the park said that the ride will be completely re-inspected by a third-party maintenance team and the state of New Jersey before reopening.

=== Employee/guest incidents ===
- On March 31, 1986, three parkgoers were stabbed in two separate incidents including an attempted robbery inside the park.
- On April 19, 1987, an unidentified gunman fired several shots into a crowd on the plaza inside the main gate, wounding one man and sending panicked guests running for safety. It was the third violent incident of the day, following two earlier unrelated stabbings. The park was evacuated a few minutes after the shooting, about an hour earlier than its scheduled 8:00 p.m. closing time. Park officials modified security after the incident, including adding metal detectors at the park's entrance.
- On July 14, 1987, a 32-year-old female worker from Plumsted Township, New Jersey suffered a fractured vertebra when a camel knocked her down. She remained in fair condition at Freehold Area Hospital.
- On September 1, 2017, a 19-year-old male worker was struck by a lift truck as he was stringing lights near a park fountain. He was taken to the hospital and later died from his injuries.
- On August 29, 2021, a woman entered a restricted area and suffered injuries to her leg after slipping off a rooftop as stated by a park spokesperson. She was taken to a local hospital for further evaluation. The incident occurred in a fenced off area between the Kingda Ka and Zumanjaro: Drop of Doom rides, both of which were temporarily shut down while the issue was addressed.

=== Haunted Castle ===
- On May 11, 1984, eight teenage visitors were trapped in the Haunted Castle attraction, and died when it was destroyed by fire. Six Flags Great Adventure and its parent company Six Flags were subsequently indicted for aggravated manslaughter, accused of recklessly causing the deaths by taking inadequate precautions against a fire. In the subsequent trial, the prosecution argued that repeated warnings by safety consultants to install sprinklers or smoke alarms had been ignored. The defendants denied any culpability and contended that the fire was arson and that no precautions would have saved lives. The trial jury found the defendants not guilty. A light bulb had burned out in one of the rooms of the attraction, and a 14-year-old boy lit a cigarette lighter to find his way through the darkness. The flame ignited some foam rubber padding which was used to protect people from bumping into a wall. A fire resulted, which quickly spread throughout the 17-trailer structure with the help of extremely flammable building materials. The fire eventually engulfed and destroyed the attraction.

=== The Joker ===
- In June 2016, a Philadelphia man received multiple injuries to his foot and knee while riding, when his leg struck a bar attached to the coaster. The victim sued the park for negligence in May 2018.
- On November 15, 2018, a girl's mother from Camden, New York filed a lawsuit after an injury. She claimed that her daughter, who was on a class trip to the park, was waiting in line to ride the coaster when a wayward metal washer weighing 10 pounds (4.5 kg) and measuring 10 inches (25 cm) fell from the ride, injuring her left shoulder.
- In August 2019, a paraplegic man who had a spinal cord injury was grievously injured when his legs became unsecured during the ride, causing him to land onto the restraining bar multiple times. A lawsuit was filed on August 6, 2021.
- On July 14, 2021, a 7-year-old boy suffered head injuries while riding the coaster and was taken to a nearby hospital for evaluation. The coaster was temporarily shut down for inspection, but was found to be operating normally.

=== Kingda Ka ===
- On June 8, 2005, a bolt failed inside a trough that the launch cable travels through. This caused the liner to come loose, creating friction on the cable and preventing the train from accelerating to the correct speed. The rubbing of the cable against the inside of the metal trough caused sparks and shards of metal to fly out from the bottom of the train. The ride was closed for almost two months following the incident, but later reopened on August 4.
- On July 26, 2012, 12-year-old Shane Matus from Howell Township, New Jersey was struck in the face by a bird while riding the roller coaster. He suffered minor injuries and was taken to a nearby hospital.
- In May 2018, before Steven Keim Jr. from Pennsylvania could ride, he was told by someone that no loose articles or objects could be brought into the attraction and a park employee told him he could leave his cellphone under some foliage in a nearby bamboo grove during the time of his ride. After he exited the attraction, he suffered serious injuries after stepping on a piece of bamboo that went through his shoe, penetrating through the sole of his right foot. A lawsuit was then filed for the injuries he sustained.
- On May 29, 2019, Christopher Fabricant, who was apparently a doctor from Red Bank, New Jersey, filed a lawsuit against the park and claimed that he became injured after riding the roller coaster with his son back in 2017. He suffered a spinal cord injury.

=== Lightnin' Loops ===
- On June 17, 1987, 19-year-old Karen Brown from Chester, Pennsylvania, was killed after falling from the Lightnin' Loops shuttle loop roller coaster. An investigation by the State Labor Department concluded that the ride itself was operating properly, but that the ride operator started the ride without checking that all of the passengers were securely fastened by the safety harnesses. The Department's Office of Safety Compliance further concluded that the accident would not have occurred if proper procedures had been followed. The park was found to be in violation of the Carnival/Amusement Ride Safety Act and was subsequently charged with the maximum state fine of $1,000.

=== Parachuter's Perch ===
- In May 2019, Sharon Glass from Williamstown, New Jersey suffered facial injuries when a park worker accidentally raised the ride's security bar too high which led to her having a fractured nose and a portion of her ear being removed. A lawsuit was filed two years later on June 9, 2021, in response to the injuries she sustained in the accident.

=== Rolling Thunder ===
- On August 16, 1981, Scott Tyler, a 20-year-old park employee from Middletown Township, New Jersey, fell to his death from the Rolling Thunder roller coaster during a routine test run. An investigation by the New Jersey Labor Department concluded that the man may not have secured himself with the safety bar. A park representative later confirmed this conclusion, saying that the employee "may have assumed an unauthorized riding position that did not make use of safety restraints." The ride was inspected, and the Labor Department concluded that the ride was "operationally and mechanically sound."
- On August 29, 1981, a 19-year-old woman from Philadelphia, Pennsylvania was found to have been slumped over in her seat when the train returned to the station. She was taken to Freehold Area Hospital where she was pronounced dead after arrival. An autopsy revealed that she choked to death from aspiration of gastric contents while riding the coaster.
- On May 7, 1983, six people were injured when a coaster train failed to stop at the loading platform and collided with another that was heading up the lift. The ride was modified a year later to prevent the train from entering the station until the one ahead of it cleared the lift.
- On August 6, 1990, 19-year-old Kurt Koester from New Providence, New Jersey suffered severe injuries and remained in critical condition at CentraState Medical Center after falling 50 feet (15 m) from the ride. Police and park officials claimed that he and another person who were both on board the train they were sitting in tried to stand up when it curved around part of its track. The ride remained closed until being fully inspected by state officials to make sure that it was up and running again as usual.

=== Runaway Mine Train ===
- On August 28, 1977, a train collided with another one that was at the station, causing 14 people to be injured, with one person hospitalized. When the ride finally reopened after already being checked for inspection beforehand, only one of the coaster's trains was running.

=== Sarajevo Bobsled ===
- On July 22, 1987, a 33-year-old man from Binghamton, New York suffered injuries to his leg when a park employee started and stopped the ride while the guest was still boarding the train.

=== Saw Mill: Log Flume ===
- On June 13, 2021, two riders were taken to a local hospital after a boat nearly tipped sideways. Several passengers were treated by first aid staff and the ride was closed for inspection and evaluation.

=== Skyride ===
- On August 16, 1977, a 24-year-old mechanic who was trying to repair the ride got caught in the drive wheel when one of the cars suddenly began to move. He later died from the injuries sustained in the accident.

== Six Flags Great America ==
From 2004 to September 2007, OSHA inspected Six Flags parks five different times and found a total of four violations. On September 10, 2007, OSHA cited Great America with 38 safety violations, alleging "multiple serious and repeat violations at the amusement park, ranging from defective emergency brakes on an industrial truck to a lack of labeling procedures for preventing inadvertent machine start-ups." OSHA fined the park US$117,700.

=== American Eagle ===
- On September 9, 1984, three guests were hospitalized after two trains collided in the station.
- On September 7, 1997, the three rearmost cars of a coaster train became detached from the other two, causing minor injuries for four riders, who were treated at St. Therese Medical Center in Waukegan.
- On May 22, 2002, 11-year-old Courtney Philbin from Glenview, Illinois suffered a traumatic brain hemorrhage after riding on the coaster. She was taken to Glenbrook Hospital in Glenview late that night, then transferred to Children's Memorial Hospital in Chicago, Illinois, where she underwent brain surgery. She was then in a coma for about four days, and stayed in the hospital for two weeks before her release.

=== Cajun Cliffhanger ===
- On August 10, 1993, 11-year-old Tyson Burke of Cary, Illinois had his foot trapped between the spinning wall and floor of the ride. He was taken to a Waukegan hospital by one of the park's courtesy cars.
- On May 8, 1995, 17-year-old Adrienne Loduha of Wauwatosa, Wisconsin slipped down from the wall of the ride and had both feet become caught in the ride's floor. She was taken to a Waukegan hospital in an ambulance.
- On July 19, 2000, 12-year-old Kati Konstantaras from McHenry, Illinois suffered two crushed toes after the floor of the ride was improperly raised prior to the ride coming to a complete stop. A second guest also had her foot trapped in this accident. During an ensuing lawsuit, the two previous injuries on the Cajun Cliffhanger were publicly disclosed for the first time, alongside 11 other incidents and minor injuries that occurred between 1993 and 2000. The ride was permanently shut down as part of an out-of-court settlement.

=== Demon ===
- On July 13, 1993, a train collided at slow speed with another one at the station, causing injuries to eight people. All of them were treated at local hospitals and released the same day. After the incident, the ride remained closed for a short period of time for repairs, following an investigation from the park staff and the fire department.
- On April 18, 1998, 23 riders were stranded upside down in the middle of the ride's second vertical loop. Firefighters used an aerial fire apparatus to bring riders to safety, although some were on the ride for as long as three hours. The incident was the result of a partial derailment.

=== The Edge ===
- On May 22, 1984, three teenage boys were seriously injured when the ride vehicle fell back down the lift shaft.

=== Guest-related altercations ===
- In May 1987, two teenagers were shot in the amusement park's parking lot, leading the park to cancel their "grad night" event.
- On September 23, 2017, at around 9 p.m. during the park's annual Fright Fest event, a family from Batavia, Illinois was hospitalized with non-life-threatening injuries when they were attacked by several teenagers. All nine of the teens were arrested by police at the scene.
- On June 13, 2021, multiple sources claim that four people suffered injuries and a suspect reportedly used pepper spray on a crowd of people as numerous fights broke out inside the park. The people who were involved in the fight were treated by paramedics, including one victim who sustained a significant laceration and required stitches.
- On June 27, 2021, a man was reportedly knocked unconscious during a fight that occurred inside the park on Sunday evening and was seen convulsing on the ground near X-Flight. The Gurnee police and fire department were called to the scene and the victim was then transported to Advocate Condell Medical Center in Libertyville, Illinois.
- On July 19, 2022, a 32-year-old man from Chicago, Illinois, was arrested after the man shoved a police officer and resisted arrest while the officer was trying to control an altercation between adults and children.
- An incident occurred on August 14, 2022, when unknown assailants shot three people in a drive-by shooting at the park's parking lot in a white sedan, with initial reports suggesting there was an active shooter inside the park. The incident had occurred near park closing, and all guests were evacuated. Gurnee police had stated that the shooting was not a random act, and was a targeted shooting. All victims suffered non-life-threatening injuries. Two of the victims were transported to Advocate Condell Medical Center in Libertyville, Illinois; both were released from the hospital the following day.
- On May 29, 2023, six teenagers ranging from ages 14 to 18 from Illinois and Indiana were arrested for causing a fight near the front entrance of the amusement park, which resulted in police using pepper spray. Three of the teenagers and four officers from the Gurnee Police Department were taken to Advocate Condell Medical Center in Libertyville, Illinois, after sustaining injuries.
- On July 7, 2025, around 8:20 PM, gunshots were fired in the parking lot. It is believed to have started from an argument. No injuries were reported. The Gurnee Police Department stated that there was no threat to the public.

=== Lawsuits ===
- In June 1999, a 19-year-old ride operator who worked on Yogi Bear's Yahoo River Ride was accused of molesting three young girls between the ages of 5 and 7 while he was unbuckling them from the ride. The ride operator was charged with aggravated criminal sexual abuse and was sentenced to four years in prison. After the families of two of the girls filed a civil suit against the park, Six Flags agreed to pay $1.4 million to each of the families.
- In 2019, Six Flags faced a lawsuit that went to the Illinois Supreme Court over Great America's collection of biometric data, including fingerprint scans, from its guests. Stacy Rosenbach sued the park after her teenage son was asked to provide a thumbprint scan during a 2014 field trip. In the case of Rosenbach v. Six Flags Entm't Corp, the park and its owners were found to be in violation of Illinois' Biometric Information Privacy Act. The class action lawsuit over the use of fingerprint scanners at the park entrance in the case of Rosenbach v. Six Flags Enm't Corp was settled for $36 million on June 12. Each guest would receive $200 if they visited the park between October 2013 and December 31, 2018. A final hearing was on October 29.

=== Non-ride incidents ===
- On June 8, 1981, a tank of chlorine gas used to purify the water in the park's two log flumes, Logger's Run and Yankee Clipper, leaked. 53 park guests and employees were sent to nearby hospitals after being exposed to a cloud of the gas, with eight people requiring inpatient care.
- On July 14, 1988, a two-hour-long power outage in Gurnee caused about half of the park's rides and attractions to abruptly stop functioning. Several rides were required to use backup generators to safely bring guests to the ground, and all affected areas were successfully evacuated within 20 minutes of the start of the outage. The park did not close early for the day, but some rides did not reopen after power was restored.
- On January 22, 1999, the entire Pizza Orleans fast-food restaurant was destroyed by a fire. The flames threatened the adjacent Theater Royale, but firefighters were able to prevent it from spreading. The restaurant was declared a total loss and damages were estimated at $125,000.
- On October 12, 2008, a park employee dressed up as a werewolf suddenly lost balance while walking on stilts and fell through a window inside the park's restaurant, injuring a guest who was standing nearby the window. The victim was taken to a nearby hospital, treated for injuries and later released. The employee was not injured.

=== The Orbit ===
- On June 2, 1988, 13-year-old Angela Austin of Blue Island, Illinois, suffered cardiac arrest while waiting for the ride to begin. Unaware that anything was wrong, operators started the ride normally and ran it to its completion. After her condition was discovered, Austin was taken to St. Therese Medical Center in Waukegan, where she was reported to be in critical condition.

=== Ragin' Cajun ===
- On May 29, 2004, Jack E. Brouse, a 52-year-old ride mechanic from Zion, Illinois, was struck by a roller-coaster car as he attempted to cross the tracks resulting in a traumatic head injury. He died several days later at Froedtert Hospital in Milwaukee.

=== Raging Bull ===
- On May 3, 2003, 11-year-old Erica Emmons from Gary, Indiana collapsed after riding the Raging Bull coaster while on a trip with her sisters, cousins and aunt. She died after being taken to St. Therese Hospital in Waukegan. Emmons had been chewing on a piece of chewing gum while on the ride, and the Lake County coroner initially said that she most likely died from choking on the gum. In response, Six Flags placed signs in front of all Great America rides stating that food and drink were prohibited. However, a further investigation by a coroner's jury determined that the gum was not a factor in Emmons' death and ruled that she died of cardiomegaly, for which she had received treatment from a cardiologist.

=== Sky Trek Tower ===
- On June 22, 2015, the ride came to an unexpected stop. Riders were evacuated down a 330-foot staircase, a process that took two hours. No injuries were reported.

=== Splashwater Falls ===
- On March 11, 2008, 46-year-old worker Thomas Lee of Pleasant Prairie, Wisconsin, fell 40 feet (12 m) from the defunct ride during demolition. He suffered head and chest trauma and was later pronounced dead after being taken to Advocate Condell Medical Center.

=== Sprocket Rockets ===
- On August 16, 2006, 10-year-old Jaclyn Silberman from Arlington Heights, Illinois collapsed and died after riding the Spacely's Sprocket Rockets roller coaster in the Camp Cartoon Network area. An autopsy showed that she died of a congenital heart anomaly. Her family said that she had a history of the anomaly.

=== Superman: Ultimate Flight ===
- On September 9, 2017, 50-year-old Scott Barnes from Andersonville, Indiana, died after riding the flying roller coaster. Exiting the attraction, the man complained of feeling sick, then collapsed on the ramp. He was taken to nearby Advocate Condell Medical Center, where he later died from what was termed a "natural death".

=== Viper ===
- On June 25, 1997, a 14-year-old Waukegan boy's arm was injured when he dangled it outside the car. His limb got caught between the car and the platform as the ride reentered the station and slowed to a stop.

=== Whizzer ===
- On July 24, 1976, two trains on Willard's Whizzer collided in the station area. 13 or 14 riders sustained minor injuries and were treated at local hospitals.
- On August 18, 1976, another collision occurred on the ride. According to the U.S. Consumer Product Safety Commission, as many as 18 riders were injured.

== Six Flags Hurricane Harbor Arlington ==
=== Lazy River ===
- On September 5, 2011, 64-year-old Linda Forbes from Allen, Texas was found unresponsive and drowned in the park's lazy river. She was pulled from the water, taken to Arlington Memorial Hospital's ICU and later died.

=== Tornado ===
- On August 9, 2012, six lifeguards suffered minor injuries on the Tornado water slide during a training session. Park officials say it was the result of 'inappropriate horseplay'.

=== Other incidents ===
- On June 23, 2021, a fight between six and eight people broke out in the parking lot. An off-duty police officer attempted to break up the fight, but 16-year-old Dai'trell Teal was hit by a gunshot, severely injuring him. He later died at a local hospital.

== Six Flags Hurricane Harbor Chicago ==
=== Hurricane Bay ===
- On June 29, 2005, 68-year-old Felipe Luna from the South Maplewood section of Chicago, Illinois had a heart attack and died in the wave pool.

=== Wahoo Racer ===
- On June 2, 2017, a woman filed a lawsuit against the park saying that she was injured while riding the Wahoo Racer waterslide back in July 2011. She suffered cuts and torn ligaments to her wrist and hands after riding and was taken to a nearby hospital to have surgery on her left hand. A court upheld $1.5 million for the case.

== Six Flags Hurricane Harbor Concord ==
=== Banzai Pipeline ===
- On June 2, 1997, the Banzai Pipeline suffered a catastrophic failure after a section of the slide collapsed under the weight of a group of over 30 students who had congregated in a section of the slide, resulting in the students falling from the destroyed section. 32 people were injured, and one of the students died.

=== Other altercations ===
- On July 13, 2019, a man from Stockton, California suffered severe injuries after being shot outside of the water park's parking lot following a parking dispute with 28-year-old Donald Sims from Oakland, California. The victim was taken to a hospital in Walnut Creek, while the suspect was arrested by Concord police.

== Six Flags Hurricane Harbor Los Angeles ==
=== Venom Drop ===
- On September 30, 2012, a 19-year-old man fell from the Venom Drop water slide. According to a spokesperson for the water park, the man cut in line at the slide, fought through the lifeguards, and jumped onto the slide headfirst. The man tumbled onto the slide and slipped over the edge, falling 60 feet (18 m) onto a fence below the slide tower. The local sheriff's office reported that the man was transported to an area hospital with life-threatening injuries.

=== Other incidents ===
- On September 15, 2001, 25-year-old Dharmesh Rupareliya was arrested after falsely reporting a bomb threat when he told a park employee that he had left a stick of dynamite inside one of the lockers. The incident resulted in over 2,000 park visitors being evacuated from the property.

== Six Flags Hurricane Harbor New Jersey ==
=== King Cobra ===
- In August 2015, Tolyndra Pierre from Brooklyn, New York, was celebrating her 20th birthday at the park. She broke her ankle while riding the King Cobra waterslide with a friend using a double tube, which was prohibited on that particular slide. Each rider also exceeded the 200-pound weight limit for single riders. As a result of the excessive weight, the raft slammed into the snake's mouth at the top of the uphill portion. She sued the park in 2016 for negligence, demanding $3 million. The waterslide was closed in 2017 and never reopened. It was dismantled in 2018.

=== Tornado ===
- On September 6, 2021, a guest was taken to the hospital complaining of back and neck pain after riding the Tornado waterslide.

== Six Flags Hurricane Harbor Rockford ==
=== Splash Blaster ===
- In July 2014, a dozen lawsuits were filed against the park and the Rockford Park District after many guests complained of suffering spinal and back injuries while on the ride. All of the lawsuits were settled for $2.53 million. The ride was removed in September 2015 following these incidents.

== Six Flags Hurricane Harbor SplashTown ==
- On April 12, 2019, a worker fell to his death from a structure. Authorities ruled it an accident.
- On July 17, 2021, over 60 people were decontaminated after being exposed to an airborne chemical leak inside the water park. 26 people were treated at local hospitals including a 3-year-old who was in severe condition. Following this incident, the water park was temporarily closed for the remainder of the day as a safety precaution. The park did not reopen for the remainder of the 2021 summer.
- On May 21, 2022, a 12-year-old was hospitalized after becoming unresponsive due to a cardiac event on a water slide. CPR was performed by employees at the scene and the child was then transported to the hospital.

== Six Flags Magic Mountain ==
- On April 18, 1993, 40 people were treated for minor injuries and 16 of them were taken to two different hospitals after a massive brawl occurred inside the park against several youths who went on a rampage during a TLC and Paperboy concert at the park. No one was arrested by the police during the scene, but the park had to close earlier than expected.
- In 2006, there were 109 complaints by Magic Mountain guests due to various incidents, according to an annual report from the Amusement Safety Organization. Reports ranged from nosebleeds and heat exhaustion to neck and back injuries from various rides. Included in those 109 complaints were 18 reports of people blacking out on the Goliath roller coaster. Other complaints were safety-related, such as notices of ride operators talking on cell phones while operating rides. The report stated that the state of California received notice of 80 injuries at Magic Mountain between January 2001 and December 2006.

=== Colossus ===
- On December 26, 1978, 20-year-old Carol Flores died after falling out of the ride. The lap bar was locked in place but it proved to be ineffective, due to the woman's obesity. This incident prompted Colossus to be closed for a year while the trains were replaced and other adjustments were made. One of the old cars has been sent to the Sky Tower.
- On June 6, 1993, one of the coaster's trains rear-ended another that was parked inside the station which resulted in seven riders suffering minor injuries. They were taken to Henry Mayo Newhall Memorial Hospital and later released. The coaster was temporarily shut down in order for the brakes on the tracks to be adjusted, plus safety tests were made to make sure it was operating normally as usual.

=== Twisted Colossus ===
- On July 7, 2022, 8-year-old Evie Evans received ten stitches on her forehead at a nearby hospital after she was hit in the face by a cellphone while riding.

=== Eagle's Flight ===
- On February 5, 1978, a newlywed couple riding Eagle's Flight fell 50 feet (15 m) to the ground when the gondola car slipped from the cable. The husband died on impact and his wife suffered disabling injuries.

=== Full Throttle ===
- On July 10, 2021, a person suffered minor injuries after getting their foot lodged between the coaster's cars and the station platform. Park staff responded immediately to the incident and the victim was safely removed from the ride and then transported to a local hospital for further evaluation.

=== Goliath ===
- On June 2, 2001, 28-year-old Pearl Santos died of a brain aneurysm while riding Goliath. Her family sued the park, claiming that managers were aware of other complaints from Goliath riders and continued to operate the coaster anyway.

=== Ninja ===
- On August 30, 2008, 20-year-old Carlos Ibanez was hospitalized after being hit by the train and knocked unconscious when he allegedly climbed multiple security fences to retrieve a hat. Airlifted to the UCLA Medical Center, he was pronounced dead at 2 a.m. the following day, due to blunt force trauma.
- On the evening of July 7, 2014, a pine tree branch fell across the coaster's track, causing the first car of the train to derail, stranding the riders aboard. Four people were injured in the accident and two were treated in the hospital, all for minor injuries. Twelve days after the incident, Six Flags Magic Mountain reopened the coaster on July 19, 2014.

=== Revolution ===
- On July 18, 1978, the braking system on the coaster malfunctioned which caused the train to go 3 feet (0.91 m) backwards on the ride's lift hill when it was up the 75 feet (23 m) incline of its midpoint. Of the 22 people who were on board the ride, 10 of them suffered injuries and were taken to Henry Mayo Newhall Memorial Hospital for treatment. The ride had already been inspected earlier that morning with no mechanical problems during its test runs.
- On May 30, 1996, 25-year-old park attendant Cherie La Motte of Valencia, California was killed while crossing the tracks in the roller coaster's station. She slipped and fell into a shallow pit beneath the tracks and was struck by a train that was pulling into the station.
- On June 13, 2015, 10-year-old Jasmine Martinez who was riding the roller coaster was found unconscious but breathing after returning to the ride's station. She died the following day at nearby Northridge Hospital. A coroner's report said the girl died from natural causes unrelated to the ride itself as an autopsy wasn't performed to determine the exact cause of her death, as requested by her parents.

=== Scream ===
- On April 9, 2004, 21-year-old park employee Bantita Rackchamroon died after being struck by the roller coaster while underneath the track during a test run before the park opened that day. The roller coaster was allowed to be reopened the next week after an OSHA inspection found no mechanical issues.

=== X2 ===
- On June 24, 2022, a 22-year-old man died one day after allegedly suffering a brain injury while riding X2. His family sued the park, claiming that the ride's sudden stop caused the injury that led to his death and that he had otherwise been in "excellent health." The lawsuit was settled as of August 2026.
- In July 2026, two separate incidents of park guests sustaining severe head injuries on X2 occurred in one week. The guests were a 40-year-old woman from Hawaii and a 25-year-old woman from Los Angeles. Both required hospitalization and emergency brain surgery. As of November 2026, the 25-year-old woman remains in a coma.

=== Wonder Woman: Flight of Courage ===
- In early August 2022, 9-year-old Kaiya Kriesberg was struck in the face with a cell phone that flew from another rider. She was scarred by the phone and her family pushed Six Flags to be more strict on loose articles aboard their attractions.

== Six Flags México ==
- On June 8, 2014, around 10 a.m., a fire broke out in a warehouse of stuffed animals. Injured men and women were evacuated, leaving a 500-meter area affected. It has been established that the cause of the fire was a short circuit. At the time of the fire, the park was closed.

== Six Flags New England ==
=== Blizzard River ===
- On August 7, 1999, eight riders suffered injuries when their raft flipped over, trapping them underneath the water.

=== Cyclone ===
- On July 8, 1983, a 19-year-old rider was ejected from the roller coaster during the course of the ride after his seatbelt unfastened. A mechanical inspection was performed and no problems were found with the ride; it reopened the following day. The rider suffered a fractured pelvis.
- On September 3, 1983, a train filled with riders collided into the back of another train which was leaving the station. Five passengers were injured and were treated at local hospitals. No mechanical problems were found and operator error was ruled the cause.

=== Other incidents involving guests ===
- On June 2, 2017, a group of people who were on a class trip visiting the amusement park suffered injuries when the tram they were riding hydroplaned in the parking lot after a rainstorm, resulting in guests being tossed around. Two students were reported to have concussions according to the school's superintendent. Five of them were taken to the hospital for evaluation.

=== Superman: The Ride ===
- On August 6, 2001, one of the trains failed to stop at the ride's brake run, colliding with the other train in the loading station. 22 people were taken to hospitals with minor injuries, and 1 with critical injuries. The ride reopened twelve days later on August 18, 2001.
- On May 1, 2004, 55-year-old Stanley Mordarsky from Bloomfield, Connecticut fell out of his coaster seat during the last turn and was killed. Reports show that the ride attendant had not checked that the guest's ride restraint was secure as his girth was too large for the T-bar-shaped ride restraint to close properly. The victim's family said that due to his various medical conditions, such as cerebral palsy, he shouldn't have been allowed to ride. The park stated that the federal Americans with Disabilities Act forbids them from denying a ride to a person with a disability as long as the person can get on the ride unassisted.

=== Thunderbolt ===
- On June 25, 1995, the red train failed to stop at the station and collided with the blue train which had already started to climb the lift. According to the Hartford Courant, nine people were treated and released at area hospitals. Human error was cited as the cause of the accident; this marked the last time that two trains operated on the coaster.

=== Twisted Train ===
- On August 2, 2000, 12-year-old Joel Himmelstein from Amherst, New York began to have trouble breathing after exiting the ride, then collapsed. He was taken by ambulance to Baystate Medical Center in Springfield, Massachusetts, where he was pronounced dead shortly before 8 pm. A cause of death could not be determined, though he was found to have suffered no injuries from the ride itself. The medical examiner stated the most likely cause was an unknown pre-existing medical condition.

== Six Flags Over Georgia ==
=== Batman: The Ride ===
- On May 26, 2002, a 58-year-old Six Flags foreman was struck in the head and killed by the dangling legs of a passenger after he wandered into the ride's path after entering a locked, no-access area during the ride's operation. The passenger, a 14-year-old girl, was hospitalized with leg injuries and released.
- On June 28, 2008, a 17-year-old from Springfield, South Carolina was decapitated by the passing train after he climbed over two six-foot (1.8 m) fences and entered a restricted area. Reports said that the victim was trying to retrieve his lost hat and/or touch the ride. Additional eyewitnesses stated that the victim and a companion, who also entered the restricted area but was uninjured, were trying to take a shortcut to re-ride the ride to try to get in line first.

=== Georgia Cyclone ===
- On August 29, 1990, a 31-year-old from Duluth, Georgia claimed to have broken her neck while riding the coaster. She was taken to Gwinnett Medical Center by ambulance where she was reported to be in stable condition. Park officials temporarily shut down the ride for 45 minutes for inspection.

=== Goliath ===
- On July 27, 2006, a 45-year-old from Birmingham, Alabama died of a heart attack after riding Goliath. He was alert during the ride but was unconscious when the train arrived at the loading platform. An autopsy showed that the man had a congenital heart condition, and it was expected that the medical examiner would announce that he died of natural causes. Goliath was closed for two hours for an inspection, but was found to be operating normally.
- On October 12, 2026, a 42-year-old from Atlanta, Georgia was killed and 4 other riders were injured after he was ejected from the ride. It is unknown whether the man's fall was due to operator error or a mechanical failure.

=== Great Air Racer ===
- On May 27, 1984, four passengers were injured after a computer malfunction caused the ride's cables to drop the planes out of position.

=== Hurricane Harbor Atlanta ===
- On May 29, 2014, a 14-year-old fell ill while using the park's wave pool. Guests had to be evacuated from the area after it smelled strongly of chlorine and was temporarily shut down for inspection once additional chemicals were added. The girl died, possibly unrelated to this incident, at Egleston Children's Hospital on July 18, 2014, after she had difficulty breathing for nearly two months.

=== Log Jamboree ===
- On August 7, 1984, a 17-year-old park worker was pulled from the water after falling 25 feet (7.6 m) from the attraction. The victim, who suffered a mild concussion and lacerations, was taken to Parkway Regional Hospital.

=== Other incidents involving guests ===
- On March 6, 2021, a 2-year-old was fatally struck by a car in the parking lot. The Cobb County Police were called and the child was subsequently taken to Children's Healthcare of Atlanta where he later died.
- On March 2, 2024, opening day of the season, Cobb County police officers were called to the park to assist in dispersing "a sizeable unruly crowd" consisting of 500 to 600 people. While police were leading the crowd out of the park, multiple people began shooting, and an unoccupied patrol car was hit. A police officer fired his weapon during the incident, striking a 15-year-old who was subsequently charged with criminal conduct.

=== Six Flags Railroad ===
- On May 13, 2018, the train engine caught fire. Two employees were taken to the hospital. While no park guests were on the ride at the time of the accident, one park guest was treated at the park's medical center and released.

=== The Riddler Mindbender ===
- On April 22, 1978, a 12-year-old’s right arm was injured when it was caught between one of the cars he was sitting in and the loading platform. His father filed a $1 million lawsuit against the park for injuries sustained.
- On June 3, 1984, a mechanical problem caused a train to stop abruptly, causing four people to be hospitalized. Following the incident, the ride was repaired and put back into service.

=== Wheelie ===
- In May 2009, four children became ill when the attraction failed to stop at the end of its cycle. After returning to a horizontal position, a limit switch failed and the ride continued to spin for five to ten minutes. The park's first-aid staff treated the children, while one was transported to an area hospital by his parents; the child was not admitted, however. An investigation determined that the ride operator did not engage an emergency stop switch due to a miscommunication between her and her supervisor; the park's ride operators are trained in how to stop their rides in the event of a malfunction. Since then, additional safety features have been added to ensure that the attraction automatically stops within 15 seconds if the limit switch were to fail.

=== Z-Force ===
- On July 18, 1989, an 11-year-old from Talladega, Alabama, became unconscious while riding Z-Force. Park staff performed CPR, but the victim was pronounced dead after being taken to HCA Parkway Medical Center. An autopsy failed to pinpoint the cause of death.

== Six Flags Over Texas ==
=== Big Bend ===
- On July 1, 1972, five people were injured, two seriously, after two cars collided. The victims were taken to Memorial Hospital where one person underwent surgery and another was placed in an intensive care ward.
- On March 31, 1974, a woman was reported to be in critical condition after being taken to Arlington Memorial Hospital due to her suffering broken ribs, a fractured pelvis and lacerations after falling 20 feet (6.1 m) from the ride. The attraction closed temporarily for investigation, but park officials failed to find any evidence of the exact cause of the incident or how the woman fell off the train. On July 23, 1974, the victim filed a $250,000 lawsuit to cover medical expenses, lost past and future wages, and for "anguish" caused by a "disfiguring" facial scar.

=== Butterfield Stagecoach ===
- On May 27, 1967, 4-year-old Brenda Patterson from Haltom City, Texas was seriously injured when she was pinned by one of the coaches as the right wheel collapsed when it overturned. She was taken to Harris Hospital and had surgery on both her feet. Ten more people who were on board the ride also suffered injuries in the accident but they were all released from Arlington Memorial Hospital after receiving emergency treatment.

=== El Sombrero ===
- On August 8, 1968, ride operator John Raymond Nelson approached the ride before it stopped so he could quickly unload the passengers. Nelson lost his balance and fell into the pit beneath the ride. An ambulance later arrived and carried him to Arlington Memorial Hospital, where he was pronounced dead on arrival.

=== The Gunslinger ===
- On March 12, 2006, ten people suffered minor injuries when the Gunslinger, a Chance Rides Manufacturing "Yo-Yo" attraction, was brought to an abrupt stop and several swing seats collided with each other. Five people were sent to the hospital after complaints of back pain; the others were treated at the on-site first aid station. In October 2008, Chance recalled 85 Yo-Yo rides to repair defects that were found in this accident and one other.

=== La Vibora ===
- On May 31, 1995, 16-year-old park employee Christine Reed suffered injuries after she fell onto the tracks in the station and was run over by an incoming car.

=== Mr. Freeze ===
- On April 10, 2022, at around 6:30 pm, several guests were evacuated from the ride's surrounding area when an electrical malfunction caused smoke to spread around its interior. Five people were treated at the scene for smoke inhalation while seven were taken to a local hospital for further evaluation.

=== New Texas Giant ===
- On July 19, 2013, 52-year-old Rosy Esparza from Dallas, Texas, fell 75 feet (23 m) to her death while riding the New Texas Giant roller coaster. According to one eyewitness account, the victim – described as overweight – was concerned about being properly secured after boarding the ride. She heard other restraints click three times but only reported hearing hers click once. A ride attendant assured her that as long as she heard a click, it was secure. Some riders informed investigators that the woman was thrown from the roller coaster as it rounded a turn, and one rider tweeted that he saw the restraint come undone. Other eyewitnesses believed the seat restraint remained locked in the lowered position when the train returned to the station. The ride closed for two months during the investigation. The victim was found on top of the metal roof of one of the coaster tunnels, near the Music Mill Amphitheater. Due to its similarity to Texas Giant, Iron Rattler was closed temporarily by Six Flags Fiesta Texas following the incident. It reopened almost a month later with added seat belts. Representatives from Gerstlauer, the German company that designed and built the ride's trains, participated in the investigation. While Gerstlauer would not discuss any specifics, they released a statement saying their restraint system could not open while the ride was in motion. The investigation was completed on September 10, 2013, and Texas Giant reopened on September 14, 2013. Each train's restraint system was modified, seat belts were added, and a seat replica was placed at the entrance allowing riders to test before waiting in line. The woman's family filed lawsuits against both the park and manufacturer, both of which blamed and sued each other for the accident. On November 18, 2014, attorneys for the victim's family announced that they had reached an undisclosed settlement with both Six Flags and Gerstlauer, with a spokesperson saying the family "is very pleased with the settlement and appreciates the condolences offered by Six Flags and Gerstlauer".

=== Other incidents involving guests ===
- On March 19, 2021, a group of teenagers started a riot outside the amusement park as one person shot another in the arm. Other people were injured in the immediate aftermath when the incident took place as they ran away on foot with some frantically running towards the park exit amid panicked screams. Some also hopped fences and ducked underneath counters for safety and a large group of people hid inside a building, packed close together. The suspected shooter was arrested by the police and also charged with aggravated assault. The victim who was shot suffered non-life-threatening injuries sustained when leaving the park.
- On September 11, 2021, multiple fights broke out which prompted the park to close 30 minutes early as a precautionary measure. An 18-year-old man was arrested at the scene as he faced criminal charges.

=== Roaring Rapids ===
- On March 21, 1999, 28-year-old Valeria Cartwright of West Helena, Arkansas was killed and ten other guests were injured, when the raft they were on overturned in 2–3 feet of water due to sudden deflation of the air chambers that support the raft. The raft then became caught on an underwater pipe, which provided leverage for the rushing water in the ride to flip the boat over. In a subsequent settlement, Six Flags agreed to pay US$4 million to the victim's family, and the company said it would join the family in a lawsuit against Canyon Manufacturing Co., the company responsible for parts that were related to the accident.

=== Runaway Mine Train ===
- On August 9, 1973, ten people suffered minor injuries when two cars from a coaster train derailed as it was running through a tunnel. All were treated at Arlington Memorial Hospital and released.

=== Shock Wave ===
- On August 31, 1980, Jamie Pratt, a 17-year-old female park employee from Irving, Texas, was reported to be in serious but stable condition at Arlington Memorial Hospital after falling 25 feet (7.6 m) from the coaster during its routine test run. She was in the first car of the coaster train accompanied by another park employee, but due to her safety bar not being lowered and fully restrained properly, she fell into a grassy area below the tracks at the ride's lowest point after the train went through its vertical loops and drops. Park officials temporarily shut down the coaster for investigation.

== Six Flags White Water ==
=== Tornado ===
- On March 6, 2016, two individuals broke into the park, went past three fences, and skateboarded down the Tornado water slide as a half pipe. They were arrested on felony charges of criminal damage to property, having caused an estimated $20,000 in damage to the fiberglass coating covering the slide.

=== Maintenance building ===
- On July 11, 2010, a fire broke out in a maintenance building during operating hours, forcing the evacuation and closure of the park. The fire was contained to a single building, located adjacent to the park's wave pool and used principally for storage. Spokespeople for the water park and for the Cobb County fire department noted that everyone was evacuated safely and that there were no reported injuries. The park reopened two days later on July 13 after crews had sealed off the damaged area caused by the fire.

== 2012 WindSeeker incidents ==
During the 2012 season, all WindSeeker installations, except the Kings Island's location, experienced issues with a safety mechanism that would engage and strand riders in the air. Knott's Berry Farm experienced two occurrences, and in one of those, riders were stranded for nearly four hours. The California Occupational Safety and Health Administration ordered the closure of the ride on September 19 pending an investigation into the cause. On September 21, Cedar Fair decided to close all WindSeekers, pending an internal review. An evacuation system designed by the ride's manufacturer, Mondial, was installed at all Windseeker locations, beginning with Knott's Berry Farm. The system involves an employee riding in a metal cage that ascends the ride's shaft, enclosing up to four seats to safely evacuate riders.

== Former properties ==
=== Six Flags New Orleans ===
==== Joker's Jukebox ====
- On July 10, 2003, 52-year-old Rosa Donaldson was strapping her 4-year-old grandson in when the ride started up. She was struck by a ride vehicle and later died at Lakeland Hospital from blunt-force internal injuries. The park added mirrors to the ride for ride operators to view around the blind spot where the accident occurred, and then introduced a safety announcement which notified the guests that the ride was about to start.

=== Geauga Lake/Six Flags Worlds of Adventure ===
==== Baywatch Water Show ====
- On August 17, 1996, a boat driver lost control of his boat during a Baywatch-themed water ski stunt show, crashing it into the stadium. Seventeen people were hospitalized, four were reported in critical condition, and five people were treated on-scene.

==== Big Dipper ====
- On September 26, 1999, two trains collided on Big Dipper, three people received minor injuries, and only one required treatment.

==== Dominator ====
- On May 30, 2000, a 17-year-old female park employee suffered injuries after falling 10 to 12 feet (3.0 to 3.7 m) from the passenger loading area of Dominator, then known as Batman: Knight Flight.

==== Double Loop ====
- On May 23, 1997, a 14-year-old girl began to have trouble breathing while on Double Loop and collapsed after the ride ended once she got off the coaster train. She was taken to Columbia Solon St. Luke's Medical Center where she was pronounced dead after arrival, having been suffering through an asthma attack. A park spokesperson claimed that the girl's death was not related to the ride itself and was deemed accidental. Double Loop was temporarily shut down for about an hour that same day, but resumed normal operation the next day after passing a safety inspection.

==== Hurricane Harbor ====
- On August 16, 2000, 11-year-old Jordan Fish was reported to be in critical condition at Cleveland MetroHealth Medical Center after nearly drowning in the Hooks Lagoon section of the waterpark. While doing a handstand in the 42-inch deep water, her head got sucked into a 12-inch by 12-inch pipe underwater. The pipe she was stuck in was normally covered by a grate, but the grate was described as "mushy", and that water flow was twice what it should've been through it. When she was pulled out, she was unconscious with no pulse, she had been under for four minutes.

==== Mr. Hyde's Nasty Fall ====
- On August 5, 1998, two cars collided injuring four teenagers.

==== Raging Wolf Bobs ====
- On June 16, 2007, a train on Raging Wolf Bobs failed to climb a hill and rolled backwards. The back of a train partially derailed, but there were no injuries. The ride never reopened, as the park closed at the end of the 2007 season.

==== Sky Glide ====
- On June 21, 1978, a cable malfunctioned on the ride leaving 26 passengers stranded 40 feet (12 m) in the air. All were safely removed from the ride by firefighters. The attraction reopened the next day after being fully inspected by park officials.

==== Villain ====
- On July 2, 2000, a 44-year-old woman riding Villain was injured after being hit by other guests throwing rocks at the ride. She suffered a fractured skull and a broken nose.
- On July 4, 2002, a 12-year-old girl received stitches on her forehead after being struck by an object while riding the coaster.

=== Six Flags America ===
==== Batwing ====
- On September 22, 2001, 16-year-old Samantha Allen was in distress shortly after riding the roller coaster and died after being taken to Prince George's Hospital Center. An autopsy revealed that her death was caused by a pre-existing heart condition.
- On July 8, 2025, Batwing was closed indefinitely due to an accident involving the front decorative fiberglass part of the train falling off and shattering. No riders were injured. However, the ride closed immediately after the incident. Nearly two months later, this incident resulted in the roller coaster exiting the park line-up ahead of the park's scheduled closure date.

==== Hurricane Harbor Maryland ====
- On July 13, 1983, while operating under the name Wild World, 9-year-old Chrisiti Davis drowned in the wave pool. Lifeguards reported that the boy appeared to have a seizure, but the Medical Examiner determined there was no seizure.
- On August 20, 1987, a dead, prematurely born baby boy was found abandoned behind the women's changing rooms.
- On July 4, 2005, 29-year-old Maria Salazar from Gettysburg, Pennsylvania was found unconscious after coming down the Shark Attack waterslide. She was taken to Bowie Health Center where she later died. It was concluded she had suffered a sudden heart attack during the ride.
- On June 13, 2018, a 14-year-old boy was admitted to the hospital in very critical condition after he was rescued from the wave pool. Park staff and paramedics treated the boy before he was transported to the hospital.
- On August 14, 2021, a young boy slipped and fell into the park's wave pool. Several minutes later, swimmers at the pool discovered the boy, underwater and unconscious, prompting them to notify the lifeguards, who pulled him out and performed CPR. He was reported to be in stable condition at a local hospital, although with serious injuries.

==== Octopus ====
- On August 3, 2007, a 6-year-old girl fell from the Octopus while the ride was in motion and suffered minor injuries to her head, hip, and leg. Park officials said that they assume the girl fell because she was standing up while the ride was moving.

==== Other incidents involving guests ====
- On July 8, 1997, four young men were stabbed at the park (known as Adventure World at the time). They had come to the aid of a female friend of theirs who had been sexually harassed by a guest named Rasheed Kareem Friday. When her four companions came to her defense, an altercation ensued and Friday stabbed all four. The four victims were taken to the hospital, where one underwent abdominal surgery for his wound.
- On September 26, 2014, a 15-year-old boy from Prince George's County, Maryland was severely injured in the parking lot during the annual Fright Fest event after a fight broke out. He was punched twice by someone, fell to the ground in the parking lot, and smashed his head on the concrete. The boy was put into a medically induced coma and taken to a hospital; there, he underwent head surgery in which a portion of his skull was removed so that his swollen brain could expand and heal. Two more people were injured in the incident and were also hospitalized.

==== Park-wide incidents ====
- On July 13, 2016, a bomb threat was called in right before the park opened. The Prince George's County Fire Department bomb squad and security personnel were deployed around the park and found two unattended backpacks that were determined not to be explosive. The all-clear was announced after a search of the park around 2:45 p.m. Six Flags announced that the park would be open until 8 p.m. that evening.
- On September 10, 2016, at 1:30 p.m., an unspecified phone threat caused an evacuation of the park, though a security sweep did not detect any suspicious activity. The park remained closed for the remainder of the day, but reopened as normal the following day.
- On September 25, 2021, multiple fights broke out and videos were circulated online on social media which temporarily resulted in the park closing an hour earlier than expected and officials had to change their normal operational hours for the remainder of the season. Police were still investigating the full circumstances of the incident and several victims have filed numerous reports during the time when it took place. No arrests were made.

==== Renegade Rapids ====
- On June 28, 2000, eight people were trapped when their raft overturned during the ride. All riders escaped but two were injured.

==== Two Face: The Flip Side ====
- On July 1, 2003, a roller coaster train stalled 140 feet (43 m) off the ground after a malfunction occurred, leaving a total of 24 passengers on board stranded for more than two hours. All passengers were examined by paramedics as a safety precaution once they got off, including one person who had an asthma attack and later recovered.
- In October 2007, a roller coaster train unintentionally rolled back into the station hitting a pipeline carrying hydraulic fluid which sprayed onto several riders. All suffered minor injuries, with 10 people treated at the scene and two sent to a local hospital for further evaluation. Following this incident, the roller coaster was closed indefinitely as it did not reopen for the 2008 season and was dismantled a year later in 2009.

=== La Ronde ===
==== Dolphin Lake ====
- On 8 July 1973, two police officers drowned in Dolphin Lake after attempting to rescue an intoxicated woman who had fallen into the water.

==== The Mississippi Boat ====
- On 8 July 1979, the sightseeing boat The Mississippi capsized on Dolphin Lake, throwing approximately 50–60 passengers into the water. Three people drowned and ten were hospitalized.

On 22 July 1979, a fourth individual drowned attempting to swim across Dolphin Lake after the park had closed.

==== Alcan Aquarium dolphin ====
- In 1980, during a 41-day strike by blue-collar workers at La Ronde's Alcan Aquarium, care for the dolphins ceased and three dolphins died due to neglect. The aquarium permanently closed in 1991.

==== Le Monstre ====
- On 23 May 1999, a train on the wooden coaster Le Monstre stopped on the lift hill due to a mechanical malfunction; all 28 passengers were evacuated by firefighters.
- In 2001, a burned-out motor circuit breaker caused a train to stop; passengers were safely evacuated via safety harness.
- On 19 July 2003, the lap-bar on a car lifted near the ride's apex; passengers remained safe due to gravity. Six Flags added seatbelts afterward.
- In 2006, an operations director fell into a transfer mechanism during train removal, fracturing both arms and sustaining serious internal injuries, caused by a procedural lapse.
- On 18 May 2009, a train stalled mid-course with 26 riders; firefighters escorted them down after more than an hour; no injuries occurred.

==== Boomerang ====
- On 6 July 2010, two adolescent riders experienced unlocked harnesses mid-ride; shaken but unharmed. The ride was inspected, and a faulty release switch was repaired before reopening.

==== Le Vampire ====
- On 6 July 2012, a 67-year-old maintenance worker entered a restricted zone under the moving Le Vampire coaster and was struck and killed. CSST investigation cited task misassignment and poor hazard-area management.

==== Bumper Cars ====
- On 16 July 2018, a 7-year-old child was injured while riding the bumper cars when their face struck the central steering wheel during a collision. The impact caused a small cut to the inside of the mouth and minor swelling. Park first aid treated the injury on site, and the ride was temporarily closed for inspection. No mechanical issues were found, but additional padding was added to the steering wheels and staff were reminded of height-requirement enforcement.

==== Ferris Wheel ====
- On 21 August 2019, two gondolas on the Ferris Wheel flipped upside down during a film shoot due to a weight imbalance; three people were rescued after 30 minutes; no injuries reported.

==== Super Manège ====
- On 25 August 2019, a safety harness broke during initial ascent, triggering an emergency stop. Passengers were evacuated safely. It marked the ride's final day of operation.

==== Le Titan ====
- On 16 August 2025, the ride experienced a major mechanical failure, causing the structure to shake violently. Some riders also reported oil dripping from the pendulum motor above them. The ride was safely evacuated, and no injury was reported. The ride was shut down for inspection.

=== Six Flags AstroWorld ===
==== Alpine Sleigh Ride ====
- On January 12, 1974, a woman suffered injuries after the car she was in was struck from behind by another car.

==== Excalibur ====
- On August 9, 1997, a 51-year-old maintenance worker was killed after being struck by a roller coaster train. He was working on a section of track when the train was sent out for a test run.

==== Mayan Mindbender ====
- In 2001, 13-year-old Sam Nguyen was ejected from the ride due to a faulty lap bar and suffered broken bones in his head, pelvis, and legs.

==== Texas Cyclone ====
- On August 18, 1977, 15-year-old Lorraine Winkler was injured after falling 15 feet (4.6 m) from the ride. A park manager claimed that her lap bar might have come undone during the ride.
- On October 19, 2003, 26 people were treated and released from a local hospital after a wooden board fell into the middle of a roller coaster train while the ride was running.

==== Texas Tornado ====
- On May 10, 1998, a six-car train had nearly reached the top of the first hill when smoke began wafting from the track. The train lost its grip on the tire-driven lift, slid back down the hill into the station, and crashed into a fully occupied train. Seven people went to the hospital and at least two sued after developing neck and back problems.

== See also ==
- Amusement park accidents
