= Perilous Plunge =

Defunct water ride

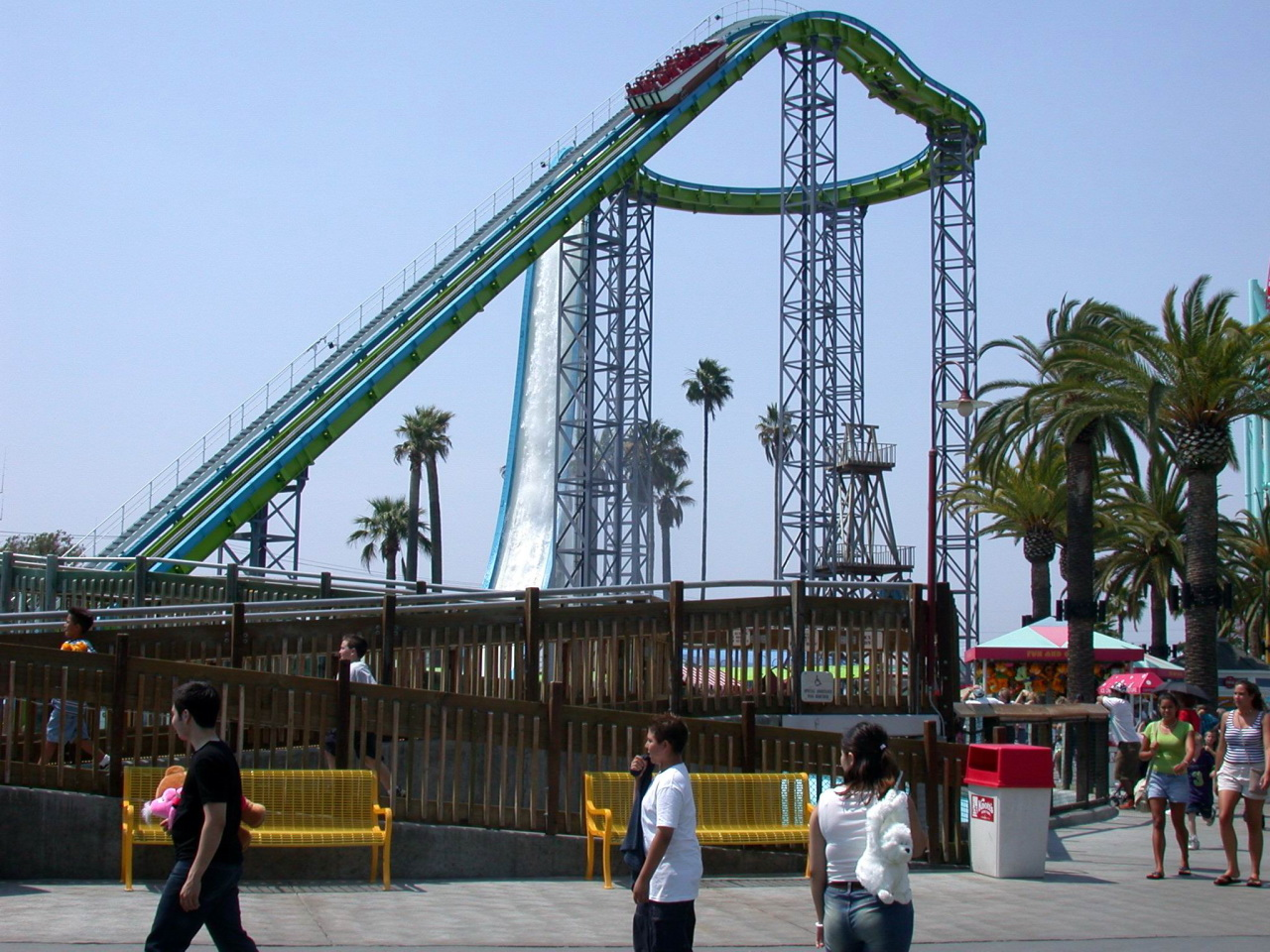

Knott's Berry Farm
- Area: The Boardwalk
- Coordinates: 33°50′43″N 118°00′07″W
- Status: Removed
- Cost: $9,000,000
- Opening date: September 15, 2000
- Closing date: September 3, 2012
- Replaced by: Coast Rider; Pacific Scrambler; Surfside Gliders

General statistics
- Type: Shoot the Chute
- Manufacturer: Intamin
- Model: Mega Splash, Figure 8
- Lift system: Chain
- Height: 121 ft (37 m)
- Drop: 115 ft (35 m)
- Length: 865 ft (264 m)
- Speed: 53 mph (85 km/h)
- Max vertical angle: 77.8°
- Capacity: 1900 riders per hour
- Duration: 1:30
- Height restriction: 48 in (122 cm)

Perilous Plunge was a shoot-the-Chutes style attraction located at Knott's Berry Farm in Buena Park, California. The ride opened on September 15, 2000, and closed on September 3, 2012.

== History ==
On August 12, 1999, Knott's Berry Farm announced that they would be adding Perilous Plunge. It would be the world's tallest water ride, surpassing Tidal Force at Hersheypark. The ride would be located in the Boardwalk section. Construction of Perilous Plunge began in November 1999 when a construction wall was erected from Hammerhead to Coasters Diner and the entrance to Boomerang. During the construction progress, the walkway was moved 40 feet (12 m) closer to the coaster. Perilous Plunge would also replace the HeadAche ride.

Perilous Plunge was originally planned to open in July 2000, but the opening was delayed due to technical issues. The new attraction had required an extensive amount of tweaks, which forced the park to push back the opening. On September 15, 2000, Perilous Plunge officially opened to guests.

On August 13, 2012, Knott's Berry Farm announced that Perilous Plunge would be closing for good on September 3, 2012, in order to make way for a new attraction. The ride has been replaced by three new rides: Coast Rider, Surfside Gliders and Pacific Scrambler, which all opened in 2013.

== Ride experience ==
The attraction was based on the pleasure piers of the past along Southern California's famed beaches such as Huntington Beach. 24-passenger boats were towed to a height of 121 feet (37 m) where a brief U-turn was taken before a world record 115-foot (35 m) water chute into a 650,000-gallon "splashdown" lagoon.

== Records ==
Perilous Plunge made its debut as the tallest and steepest water-based amusement park attraction in the world. Its drop was 115 feet (35 m). It was the first water-based amusement park ride in the world to utilize an adjustable electromagnetic braking system to control the volume of the splash.

== Changes ==
Perilous Plunge opened with a harbor-themed blue-and-white color scheme and with three 24-passenger boats, with passengers held in place by lap bars and individual seat belts. However, after a September 2001 incident in which a guest fell out of the boat during the descent and was killed, the boats were retrofitted with four-point harnesses. Shortly after the incident the ride received a more vibrant color scheme consisting of a green and blue track with lavender-gray supports. After a period of time, Knott's received two new boats with over-the-shoulder restraints. These new boats were drastically different in design and thus created a much smaller splash than the first set of boats. In addition, newer designs caused problems with the lift chain. Stress fractures appeared in the lift chain shortly after the arrival of the new boats. The ride was shut down, and a new chain was ordered. This time, the lift chain snapped (though the anti-rollback device prevented the boat from reversing down the lift hill). Finally, the problem was diagnosed and a new chain was ordered.

== See also ==
- 2012 in amusement parks
- Incidents at Cedar Fair parks
