= Jaguar! =

Junior roller coaster

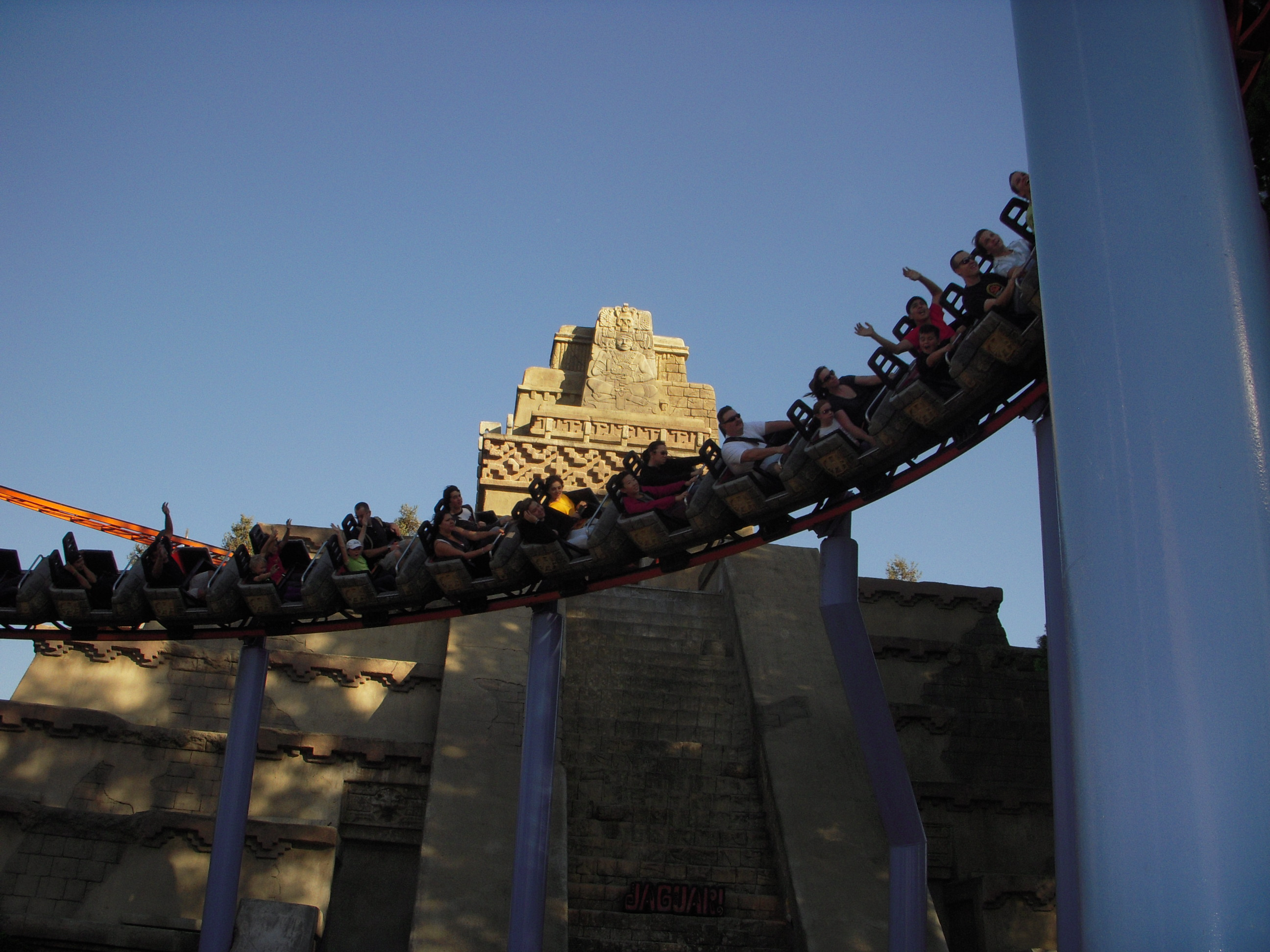

Knott's Berry Farm
- Location: Knott's Berry Farm
- Park section: Fiesta Village
- Coordinates: 33°50′45″N 117°59′57″W
- Status: Operating
- Opening date: June 17, 1995
- Cost: $10,000,000

General statistics
- Type: Steel
- Manufacturer: Zierer
- Designer: Ingenieur Büro Stengel GmbH
- Model: Tivoli
- Lift/launch system: Two Drive Tire Lifts
- Height: 65 ft (20 m)
- Drop: 45 ft (14 m)
- Length: 2,602 ft (793 m)
- Speed: 35 mph (56 km/h)
- Inversions: 0
- Duration: 2:00
- Max vertical angle: 25°
- Capacity: 1800 riders per hour
- Height restriction: 48 in (122 cm)
- Trains: 2 trains with 15 cars; riders arranged 2 across in a single row for a total of 30 riders per train
- Fast Lane available
- Jaguar! at RCDB

Jaguar! is a steel family roller coaster at Knott's Berry Farm in Buena Park, California, United States. Built by Zierer and designed by Werner Stengel, the coaster opened to the public in 1995.

== History ==
In December 1994, Knott's Berry Farm announced that Jaguar! would be coming to the park. The ride would cost $10 million to build. Although it was set to open in May 1995, this was delayed. Jaguar! would open on June 17, 1995.

One of the first changes to the ride may have been the removal of the fire effect from the top of the temple and the steaming from the jaguars located in the Station Approach section of the track during Cedar Fair's corporate take over. Another change that occurred during the operation of Jaguar! was the addition of fabric seatbelts; very similar to the ones found on Montezooma's Revenge and GhostRider, also due to Cedar Fair. A second more noticeable change was the repainting of the attraction. It was changed from a red track with brown supports to a bright orange track with light blue supports. In 2016, the colors were returned to red track and light brown supports.

== Ride experience ==
=== Queue ===
Riders approach the ride through the temple in the Fiesta Village section of the park. Many Mayan-style drawings and paintings can be seen on the walls throughout the entire temple. The bottom queue is the most themed part. On one side, riders can see prisoners that were imprisoned in the temple that are now just skeletons. On another side, riders see a giant Aztec idol with skulls on the side of him. The bottom walls are painted to show Aztec gatherings with prisoners and others. The queue winds through a series of rooms and tunnels. As riders walk up the next ramp, they can see more skulls into the temple. Straight ahead, there is giant stone tablet of some more Mayan Jaguar Warriors with the head of a jaguar. To the left of that, there is another Mayan idol head. Riders can sometimes hear the roaring of the Jaguar, activated when the train enters the helix located at the end of the coaster. Tribal drums and other Mayan sound effects can also be heard. The queue rises in elevation to the station where riders board the roller coaster.

=== Layout ===
The ride starts out with ascending a lift hill after exiting the station. Next, the coaster goes to the left and down slightly. After that, the coaster does a banked right turn up, and then travels through the top of the temple (where the fire effect used to occur) and then goes through the loop of MonteZOOMa: The Forbidden Fortress. The train then turns right and travels up a second lift hill. The track bends left, and the coaster goes through a series of bunny hills. As the track approaches the Timber Mountain Log Ride, it turns around. The train travels through some more bunny hills, then does a banked helix to the left. Finally, it goes into a brake run and arrives back in the station.

=== Trains ===
There are 2 trains, each with 15 cars. Each car seats two in a single row for a total of 30 riders. This allows for a theoretical capacity of 1,800 riders per hour. The cars have two types of wheels attached to them: Track wheels on top and guide wheels on the side. Every car has a brake fin underneath it to help in propelling the train through the drive tires and to assist in braking. Each car can seat two riders. There are three locking positions for the restraint system. The trains are themed to match the architectural style of the temple and surrounding area, with a man on the front that the employees, specifically the maintenance personnel, call Victor, in honor of a maintenance person who once worked at Knott's Berry Farm that had an uncanny resemblance to the man on the front of the train, but untimely died from a car accident.
