= Coast Rider =

Roller coaster at Knott's Berry Farm

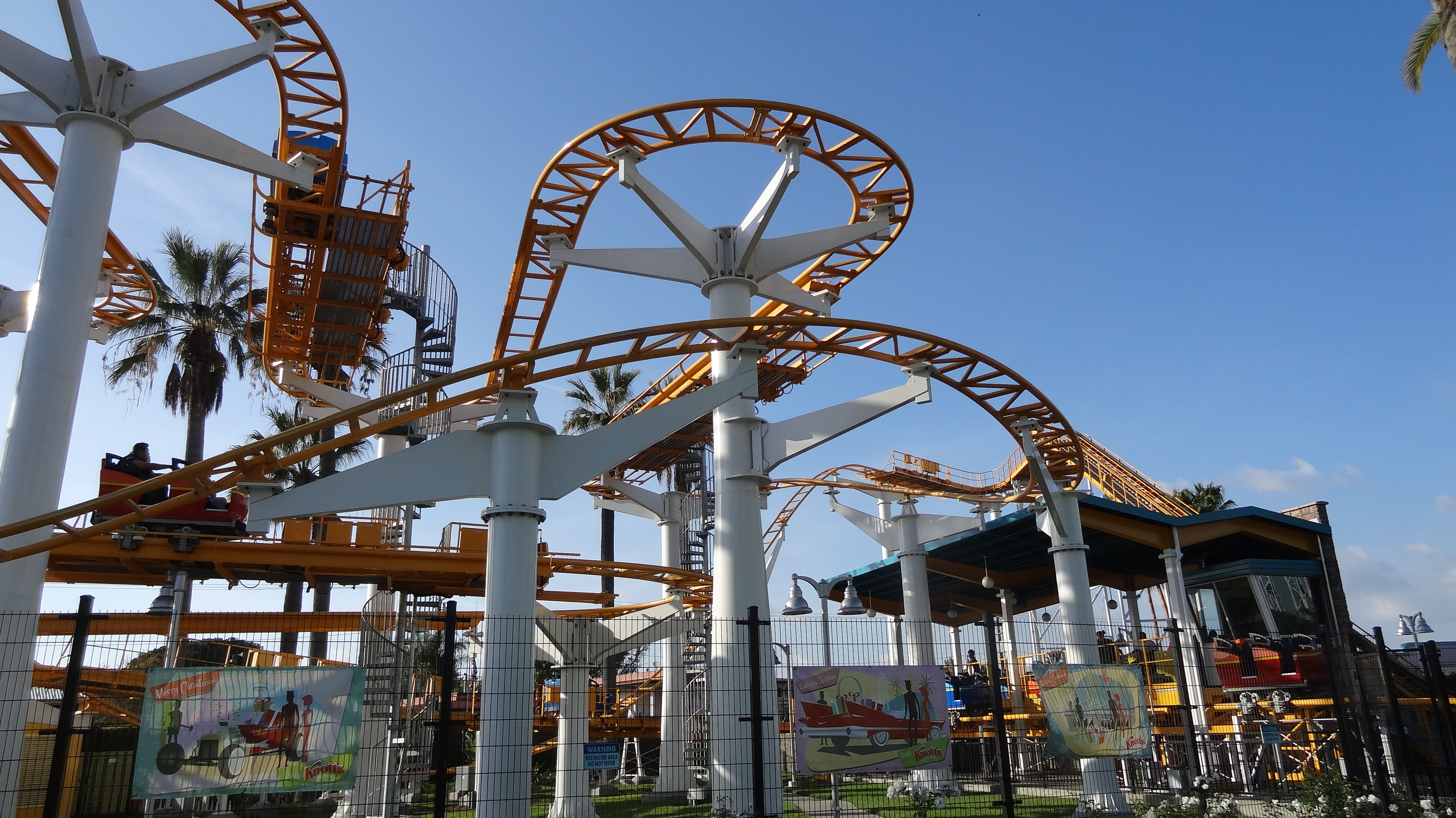
- Coast Rider at Knott's Berry Farm.

Knott's Berry Farm
- Location: Knott's Berry Farm
- Park section: The Boardwalk
- Coordinates: 33°50′42″N 118°00′07″W
- Status: Operating
- Opening date: May 25, 2013
- Replaced: Perilous Plunge

General statistics
- Type: Steel – Wild Mouse
- Manufacturer: Mack Rides
- Model: Wild Mouse (large park)
- Track layout: Wild Mouse
- Height: 52 ft (16 m)
- Length: 1,339 ft (408 m)
- Inversions: 0
- Duration: 2:30
- Height restriction: 44 in (112 cm)
- Trains: 10 trains with a single car; riders arranged 2 across in 2 rows for a total of 4 riders per train
- Fast Lane available
- Coast Rider at RCDB

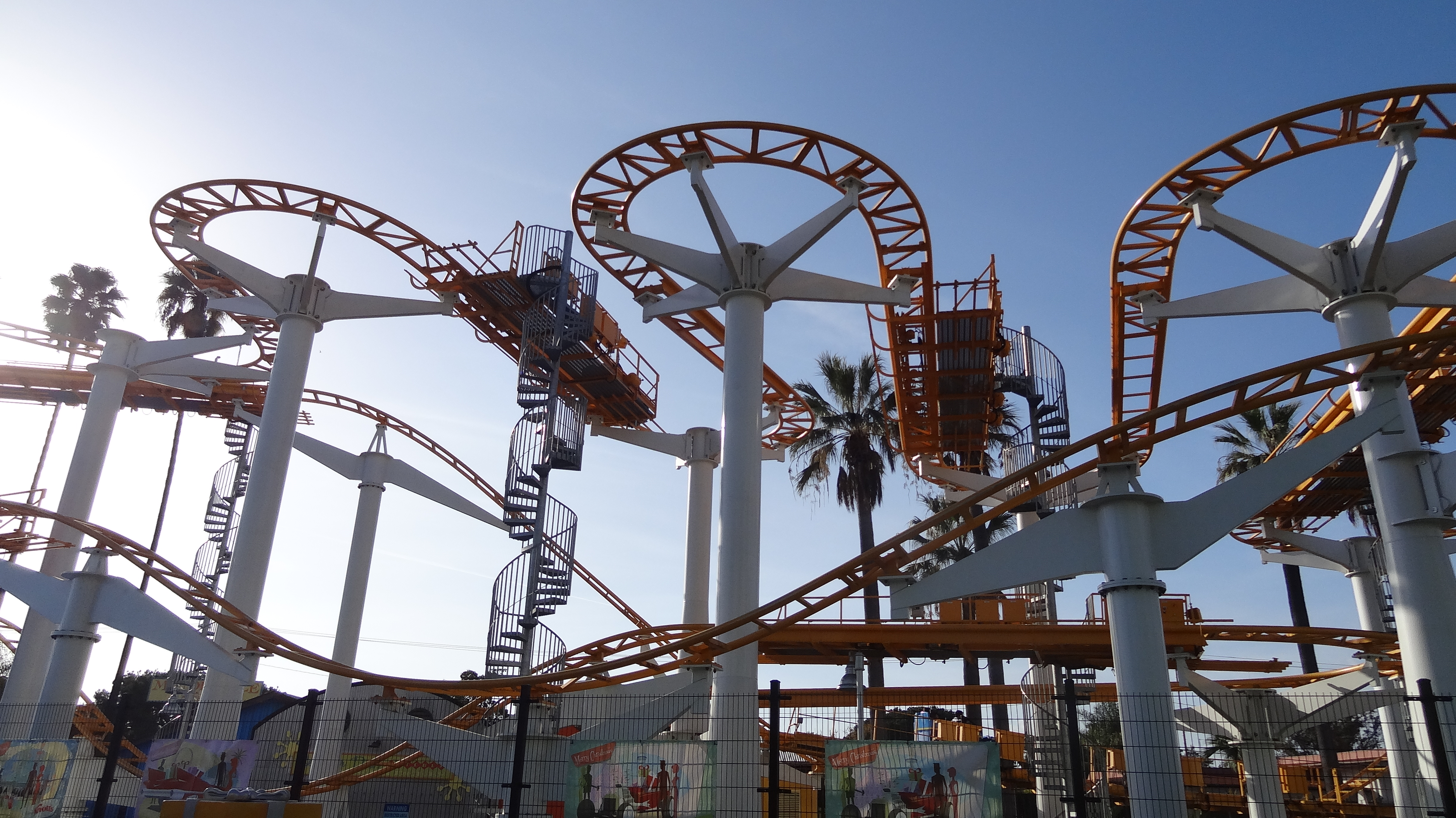
Coast Rider features a 52 foot drop and moderate turns.

Coast Rider is a steel wild mouse roller coaster at Knott's Berry Farm in Buena Park, California.

== History ==
Coast Rider operates on the former site of Perilous Plunge. Perilous Plunge closed on September 3, 2012. Cedar Fair Entertainment Company filed a trademark for Coast Rider on October 22, 2012. Knott's Berry Farm officially announced Coast Rider and two other rides on November 1, 2012. The ride opened up along with the rest of the brand new boardwalk on May 25, 2013.

== Ride experience ==
Coast Rider has a 52 foot ascent and 1,339 feet of track filled with hairpin turns, twists and spins.

The design is a reverse replica of the Apple Zapple roller coaster at sister park Kings Dominion. The ride is the same ride experience and layout, as Legoland's Lego Technic Test Track roller coaster.

== Characteristics ==
Coast Rider operates with a maximum of 10 trains. Each train contains a single car, which sit two across in two rows for a total of 4 riders.

== See also ==
- 2013 in amusement parks
