= MonteZOOMa: The Forbidden Fortress =

Roller coaster at Knott's Berry Farm

- Previously known as Montezooma's Revenge (1978–2022)
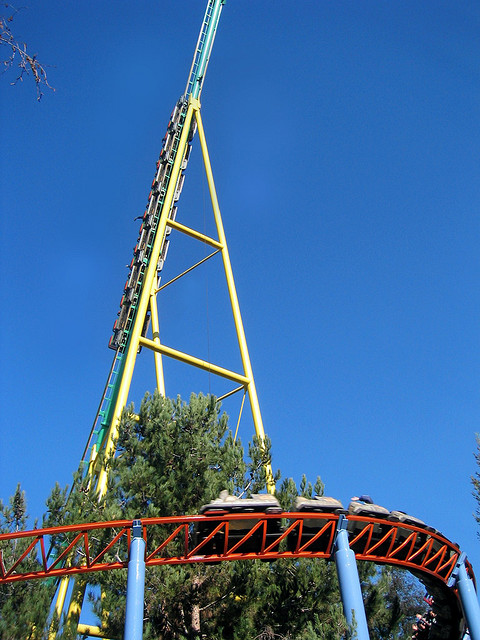
- MonteZOOMa on the tower right after the loop

Knott's Berry Farm
- Location: Knott's Berry Farm
- Park section: Fiesta Village
- Coordinates: 33.8456°N 117.9990°W
- Status: Operating
- Opening date: May 21, 1978 (original) August 6, 2026 (revival)
- Closing date: February 8, 2022 (original)

General statistics
- Type: Steel – Launched – Shuttle
- Manufacturer: Anton Schwarzkopf
- Designer: Werner Stengel
- Model: Shuttle Loop - Flywheel
- Track layout: Shuttle Loop
- Lift/launch system: Flywheel launch (original) LSM (revival)
- Height: 148 ft (45 m)
- Length: 800 ft (240 m)
- Speed: 55 mph (89 km/h)
- Inversions: 1
- Duration: 0:36 (original), 0:54 (post-refurbishment, classic cycle)
- Capacity: 1344 riders per hour
- Acceleration: 0 to 55 mph (0 to 89 km/h) in 4.5 seconds
- Height restriction: 48–79 in (122–201 cm)
- Trains: Single train with 12 cars; riders arranged 2 across in a single row for a total of 24 riders per train
- Fast Lane was available
- MonteZOOMa: The Forbidden Fortress at RCDB

MonteZOOMa: The Forbidden Fortress, previously known as Montezooma’s Revenge, is a shuttle roller coaster located at Knott's Berry Farm in Buena Park, California, United States. Designed by Werner Stengel and built by Schwarzkopf Industries GmbH, the ride opened to the public on May 21, 1978. Prior to 2022, it was one of eight flywheel-launched units around the world and the oldest looping shuttle coaster still operating in its original location. Montezooma’s Revenge closed in early 2022 for a major refurbishment. Originally scheduled to reopen in 2023, MonteZOOMa: The Forbidden Fortress had its reopening postponed several times due to construction delays, with the ride eventually reopening on August 6, 2026.

== History ==
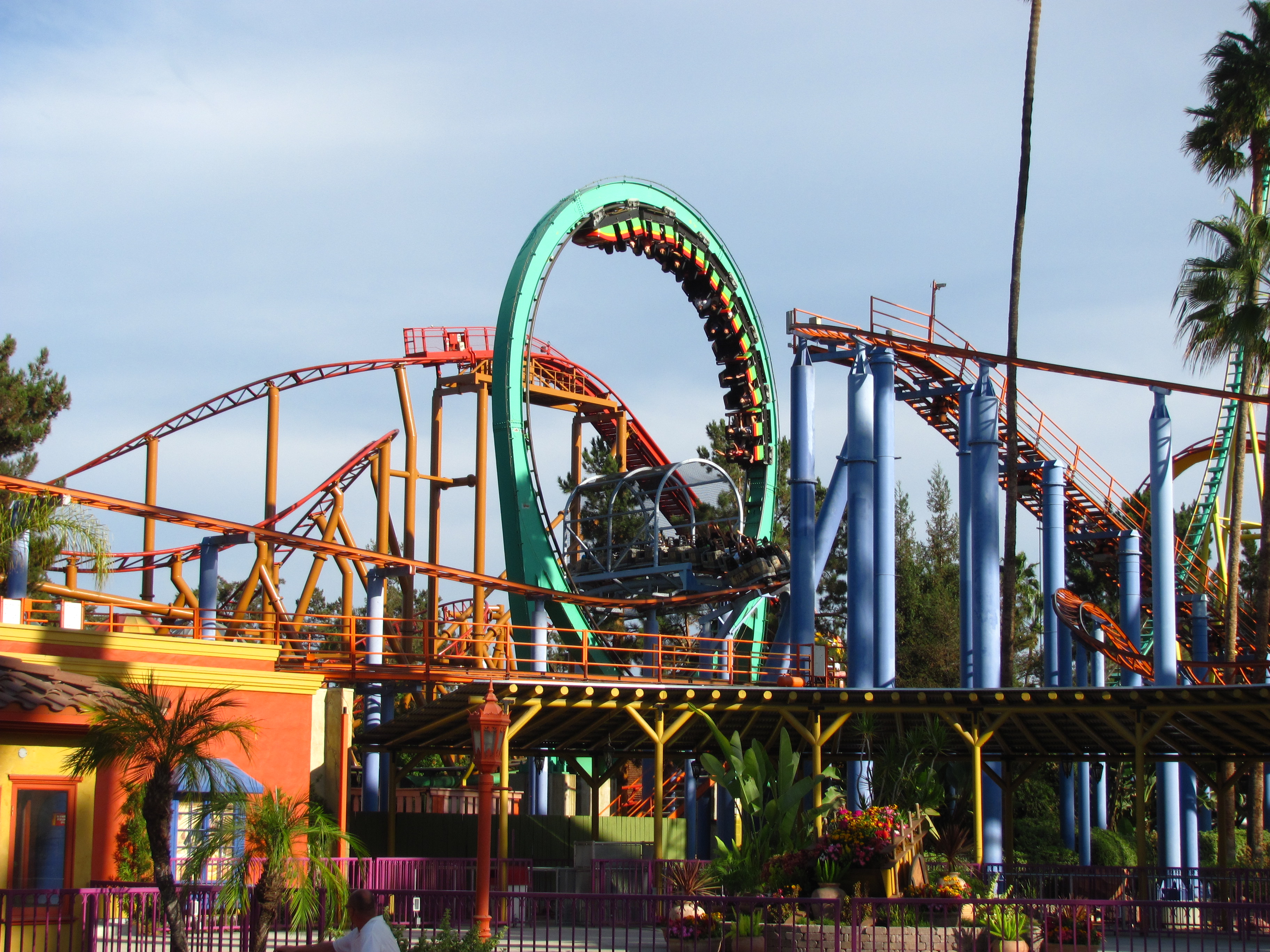
Train traveling along the center loop of Montezooma's Revenge

Montezooma's Revenge was named after the bluegrass group, Montezuma's Revenge, a musical act that performed regularly in the wagon camp at Knott's Berry Farm. Based on the launch mechanism for aircraft carriers, the flywheel-launched shuttle loop is a successor of the drop-tower launch shuttle, and predates modern LIM and hydraulic launch systems by over 15 years. The drop tower models had a large silo with a weight inside connected to a similar launch system. The weight would drop, thus pulling the cable and bob, launching the train. Drawbacks included no adjustments for inclement weather. Also, the drop-tower launch was nowhere as intense as the flywheel launch, taking almost two seconds longer to reach the same speed.

The nearby Jaguar! roller coaster, which opened in 1995, passes directly through the center of Montezooma's loop. In 2002, Montezooma's Revenge was repainted in a bright green and yellow color scheme. In 2008, Knott's opened Pony Express, a small "out and back" steel roller coaster with a flywheel launch system much like Montezooma's Revenge.

In 2017, Montezooma's Revenge was painted with orange track and dark green supports.

=== Refurbishment and new name ===
Montezooma’s Revenge closed with little notice in 2022 for a major refurbishment. The abrupt closure prompted the park to accommodate fans and reopen the ride the following day, giving enthusiasts another chance to ride before the extended closure. At the time, it was expected that the refurbished ride would reopen in 2023 along with a revamped Mexican-themed Fiesta Village area, but the date was postponed multiple times.

Some of the changes include a modernized launch and braking design, as well as an updated treasure-hunting theme and backstory. The refurbished coaster would also be renamed "MonteZOOMa: The Forbidden Fortress". The updates to the ride were provided by Dutch-based manufacturer Kumbak.

During construction, the ride's loop was replaced with an identical design painted red – the original loop was donated to the National Roller Coaster Museum and Archives along with the original signage and trains.

An opening date was set for July 20th, however it was delayed due to operational and maintenance issues. The ride would properly reopen on August 6, 2026.

== Ride description ==
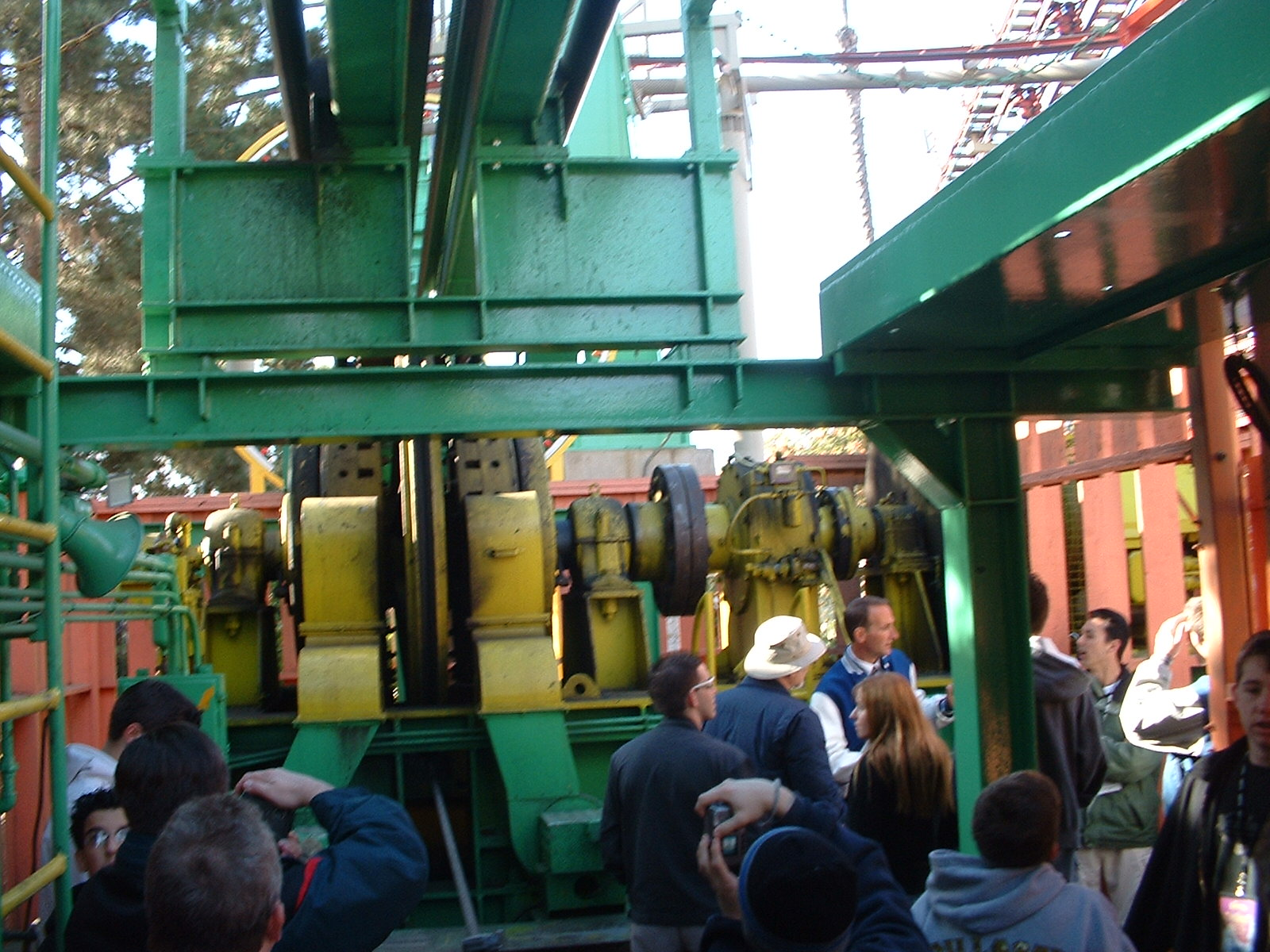
The flywheel launch system.

=== As Montezooma's Revenge ===
The ride used a flywheel mechanism to accelerate the train to 55 mph (89 km/h) in 4.5 seconds. The train goes through a vertical loop, then ascends a tower and reverses direction. It passes through the station in reverse and ascends another tower behind the station before returning back. The 7.6 tonnes (7.5 long tons; 8.4 short tons) flywheel, located outside the station and adjacent to the loop, is attached to a clutch and cable system, which in turn connects to a small four-wheeled catch car known as a "bob". On the front of the bob is a launch pin that seats in a socket in the back of the train. Once the bob is seated, the operators receive the ready light.

At launch, the clutch system engages the cable to the spinning flywheel, pulling the bob and train rapidly forwards. During the launch sequence, enough kinetic energy is removed from the flywheel to reduce its speed from approximately 1044 rpm to 872 rpm. The train negotiates a 76-foot (23 m) diameter vertical loop before ascending the 148-foot (45 m) front tower, then descends backwards, going through the loop a second time, running at full speed backwards through the station, and ascending the 112-foot (34 m) rear tower. The train then returns to its starting position after being slowed by 66 sets of brakes, 33 in the station and 33 to the rear of the station.

Unlike traditional looping coasters that use over-the-shoulder restraints, Montezooma originally only relied on a conventional lap bar restraint to secure riders. Following Cedar Fair's 1997 acquisition of Knott's Berry Farm, fabric seat belts were added as a secondary restraint to complement the existing lap bar restraints.

=== As MonteZOOMa: The Forbidden Fortress ===
Blue strobe lights first go off, and the eyes of the face in the front of the station gradually light up red. One of four random voicelines is then played. Right after the voiceline concludes, the strobe lights go off again and a fog effect rises from the track, which is lit up red. The ride is then launched out of the station using a system of linear synchronous motors, accelerating the train to 55 mph (89 km/h) in 4.5 seconds. The ride goes through a trim brake before going through a vertical loop, and then up the first spike. The train then reverses direction and goes through the loop backwards. After passing the same trim brake and coasting through the station, it passes through two more trim brakes before going up the second spike. It then passes through the station again and stops just outside of it through the use of the linear synchronous motor system. The ride then reverses and stops in the station.

The launch system does not contain a braking resistor, which means that if the ride suddenly stops power, the ride will only rely on friction and the trim brakes to bring the ride to a stop. This can cause issues with reliability as maintenance can only be called until the ride has stopped if the ride stops in the launch sections due to park policy.

This ride uses an over-the-shoulder lap bar, as well as two red shoulder straps as restraints. No seatbelts are present, which differs from the original.

== Incidents ==
Justine Dedele Bolia, a 20-year-old female tourist from the Republic of Congo, died on September 1, 2001, one day after riding Montezooma's Revenge. Bolia suffered a ruptured middle cerebral artery and an autopsy revealed a pre-existing condition. The ride was closed for several days while an investigation was conducted. Though state investigators concluded that the ride did not contribute to her death, a wrongful death lawsuit was later filed by her family in 2002. The lawsuit was dismissed in 2006.

== Awards and rankings ==
On June 20, 2019, Montezooma's Revenge was designated as a Roller Coaster Landmark by the American Coaster Enthusiasts, officially recognizing the ride as the last coaster of its kind in the United States and the longest standing in its original location. A plaque was awarded commemorating the achievement.

Preceded by King Kobra (tied with Tidal Wave and White Lightnin')	World's Tallest Roller Coaster; 1978–1983	Succeeded by Moonsault Scramble
