= Log flume (ride) =

Type of amusement ride

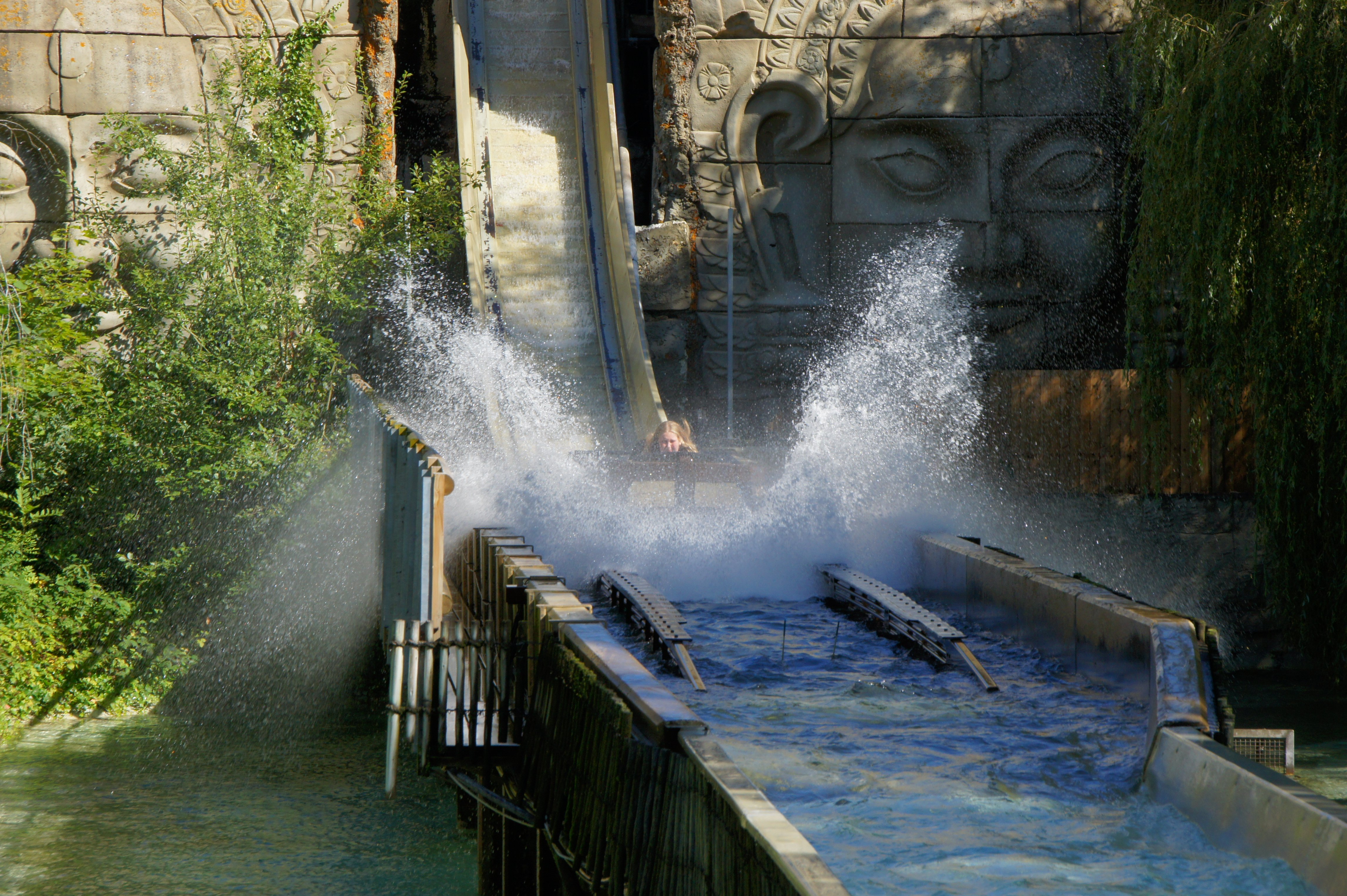
Dragon Falls at Chessington World of Adventures, Southwest London, United Kingdom

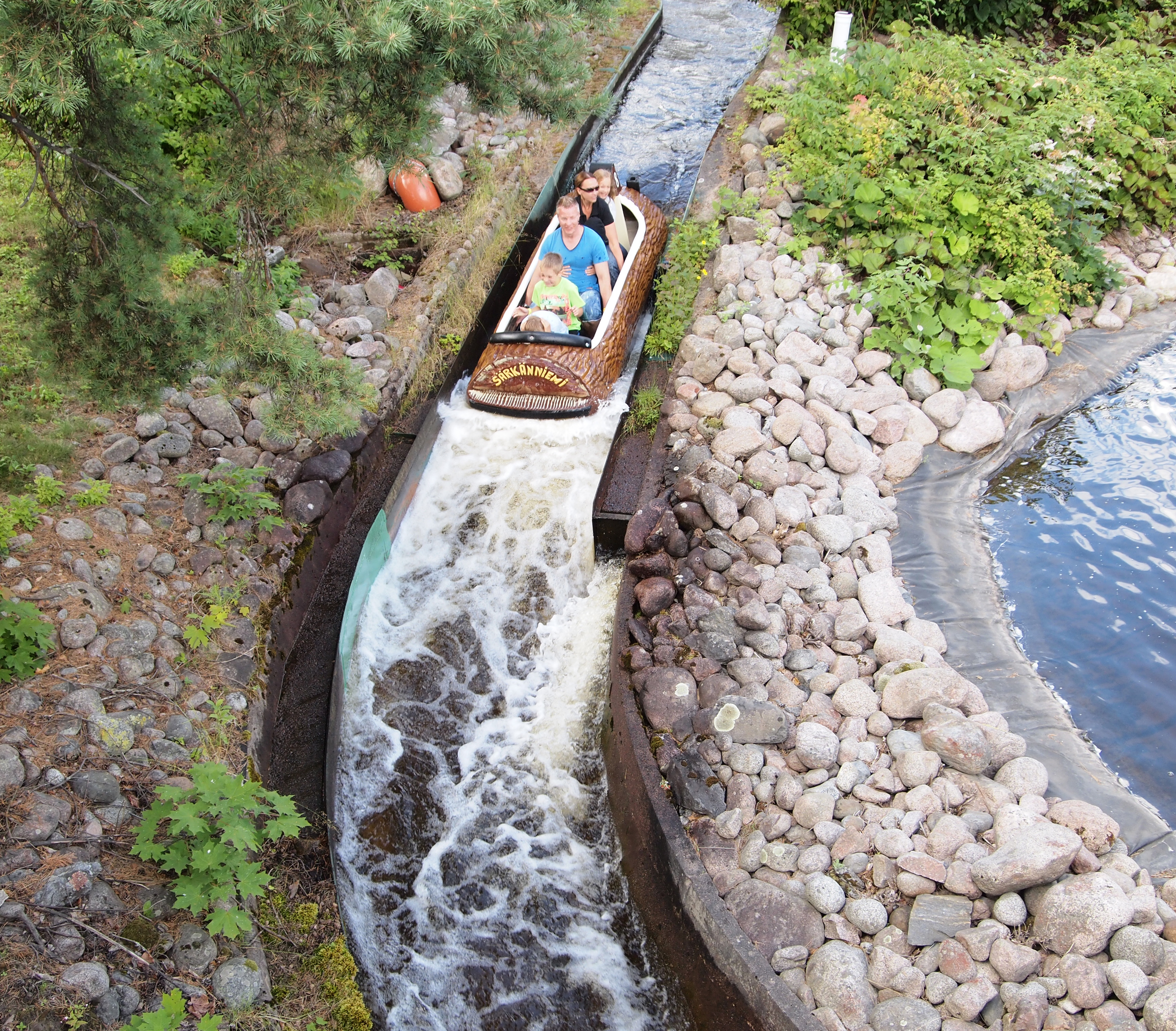
Tukkijoki at Särkänniemi, Tampere, Finland

Log flumes (colloquially known as log rides) are amusement rides consisting of a water flume and (artificial) hollow logs or boats. Passengers sit in the logs, which are propelled along the flume by the flow of water.

The ride usually culminates with a rapid descent and splashdown into a body of water, which may happen more than once (normally the largest drop being just before the end). It provides people with a way to get wet and cool off on a hot summer day, with certain seating sections usually being splashed with more water. Log flume rides are named for log flumes used in logging.

== History ==
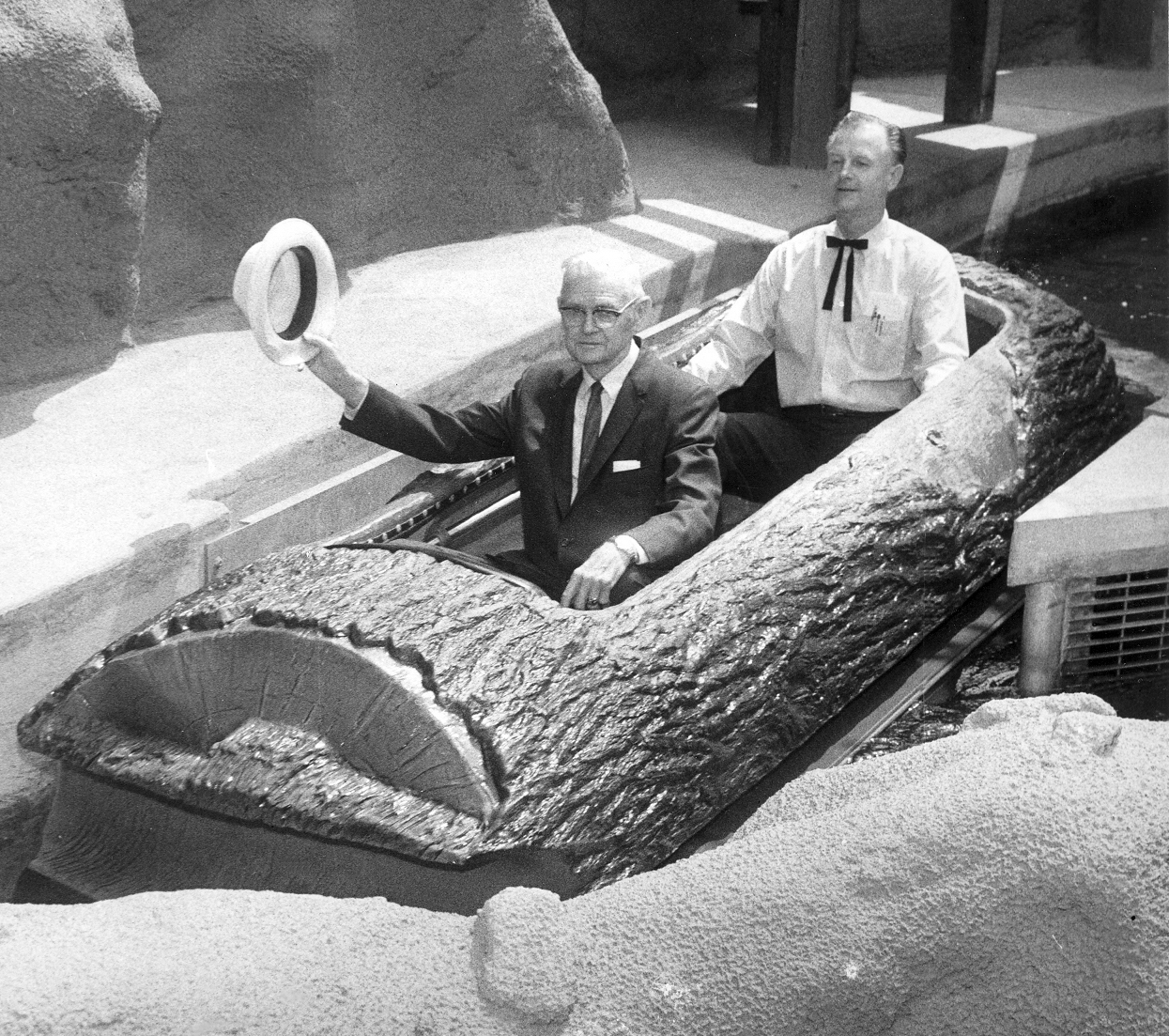
Walter Knott and Bud Hurlbut ride the Timber Mountain Log Ride at Knott's Berry Farm

Log flumes are a variant of the chute rides and old mill rides that were popular in the United States in the early 20th century. Shoot the Chute rides continue to be built today. Both of these types of rides took rather simple approaches to handling water flow. It was not until Karl Bacon of Arrow Development got involved and studied hydrodynamics that the use of water flow in an amusement ride was fully exploited.

The first modern day log flume amusement ride constructed by Arrow was El Aserradero at Six Flags Over Texas in Arlington, Texas, which opened in 1963 and is still in operation. The Mill Race, Arrow Log Flume number two, opened just a few weeks later at Cedar Point. Log flumes proved to be extremely popular and quickly became staples at amusement and theme parks throughout the world. The ride was so popular that some parks started adding second flume rides to help reduce the long lines. Cedar Point added Shoot the Rapids in 1967, and Six Flags Over Texas and Six Flags Over Georgia both added second flumes in 1968. When Six Flags Over Mid America opened in 1971, it featured twin flumes.

In the 1960s and early 1970s Arrow had a monopoly on the log flume business, producing over 50 flumes by 1979. In 1976, the French company Reverchon Industries started building flumes and in 1979 Hopkins Rides entered the flume building business. Mack Rides cooperated with Arrow to start building log flumes in 1977 and Intamin followed with building its first log flume in 1986.

== Ride design ==
Log flumes are generally out in the open, though some may contain enclosed or tunneled sections. The flume is usually made of fiberglass, concrete or galvanized steel. In a typical course, the boatful of riders floats through a small section of channel upon leaving the station, then engages a lift hill that takes them on a winding course in the water-filled trough. A second lifthill then culminates with an exciting drop and a splashdown finale. The amount of splash can be controlled by using rubber belting of differing widths and differing heights. To increase the chance of being soaked, the flume can be designed to be turbulent, or to run underneath waterfalls. Water cannons (typically coin-operated) aimed along the path are sometimes installed alongside the flume. Additionally, the exit path from the ride may cross over or go near to the flume, such that departing riders are drenched by the boat currently en route.

== Notable flumes ==
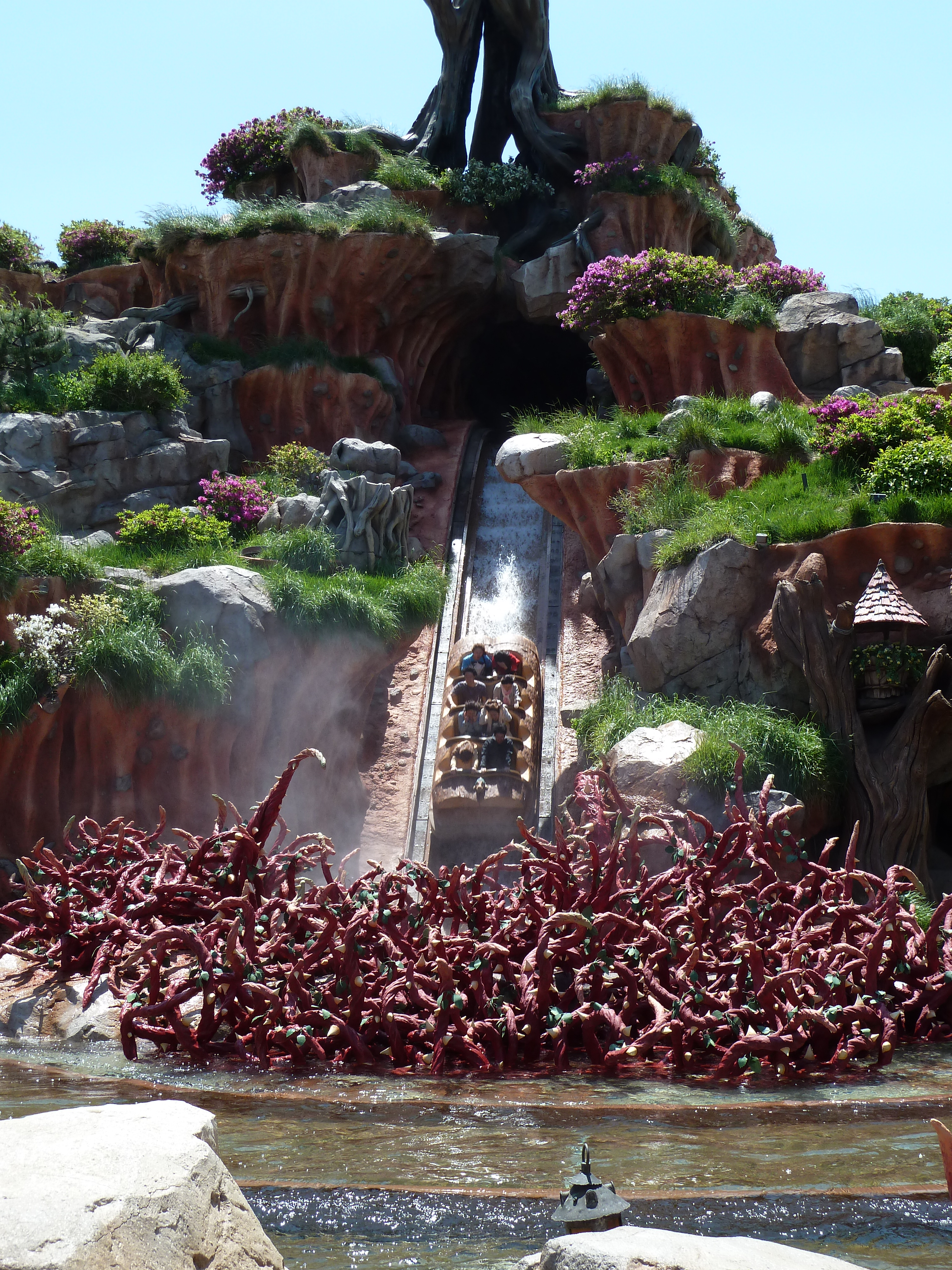
Splash Mountain

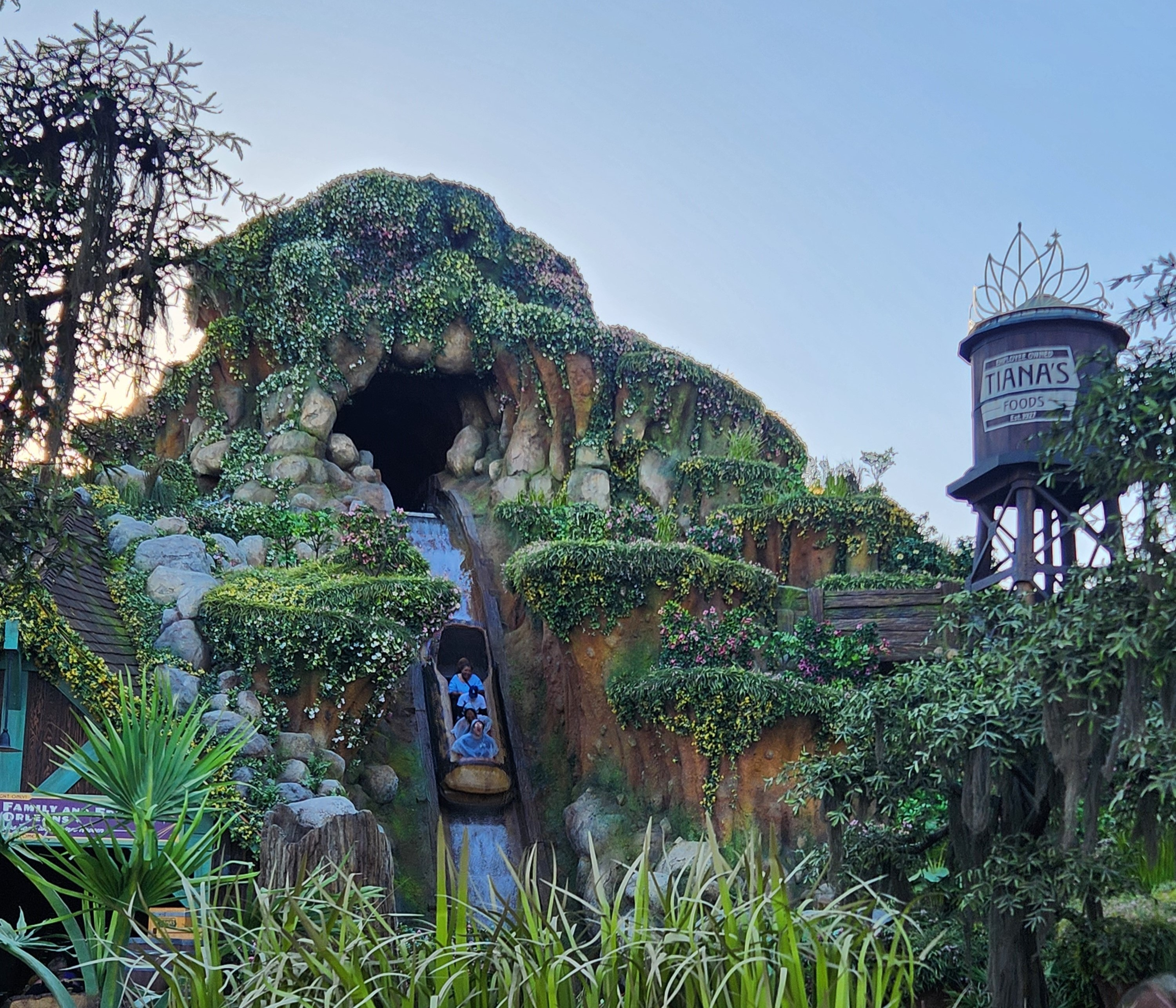
Tiana's Bayou Adventure (pictured at Disneyland)

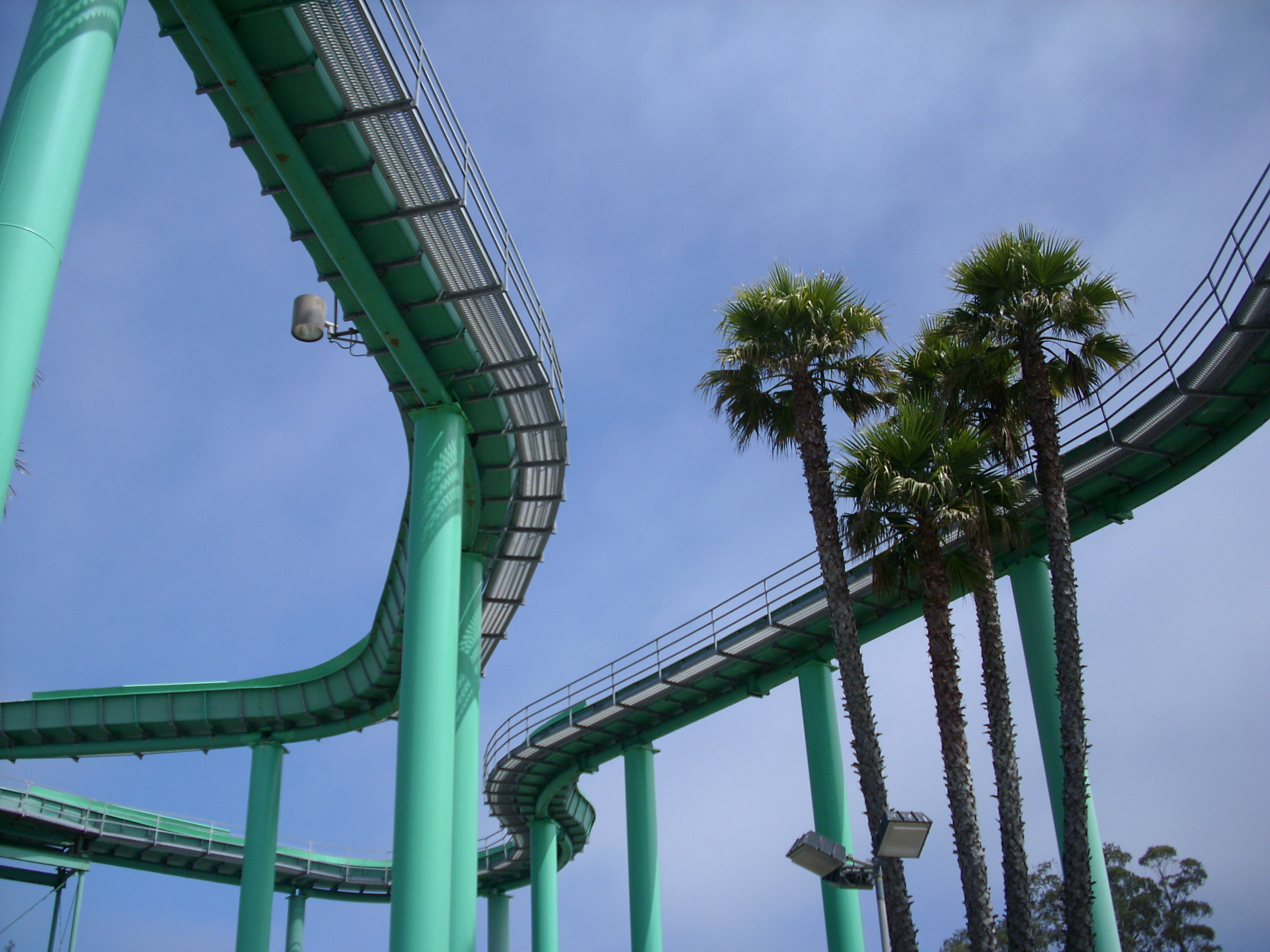
The Logger's Revenge at the Santa Cruz Beach Boardwalk

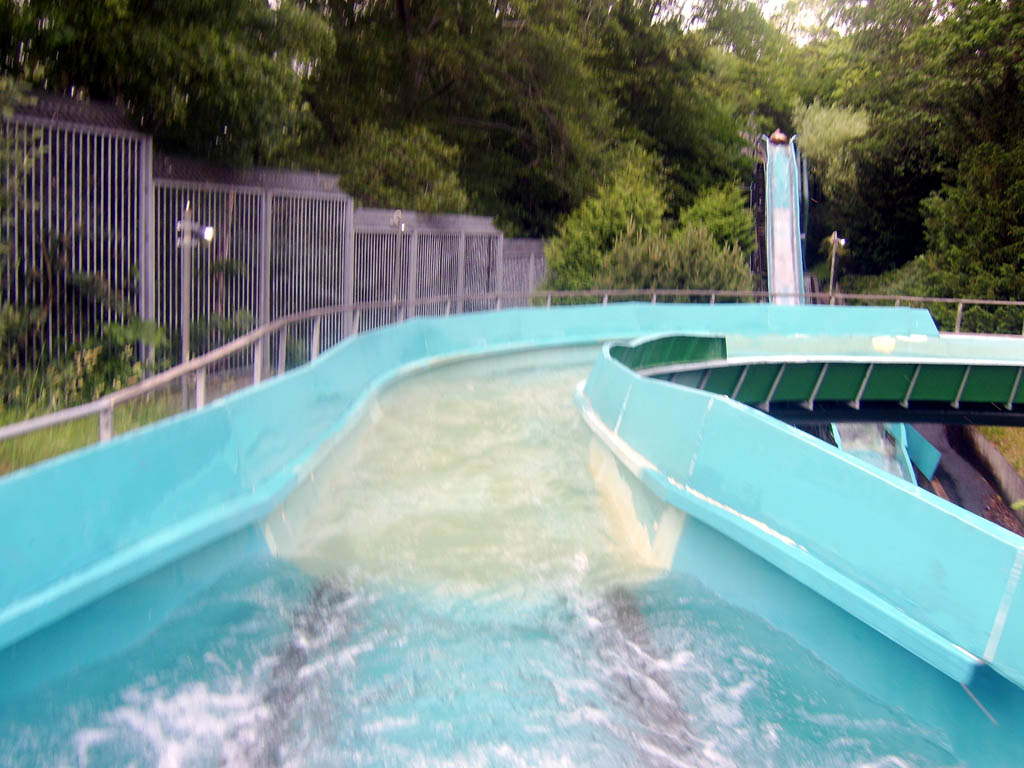
Flumeride, at Liseberg, Sweden

One of the first elaborately themed flumes was Timber Mountain Log Ride at Knott's Berry Farm. Originally built as a concession run by Hurlbut Amusement Company, most of the ride is inside a man-made mountain. Bud Hurlbut and his right-hand man Harry Suker were responsible for the theme of the ride. Upon his retirement, Hurlbut sold the ride to Knott's Berry Farm where it is still in operation.

Log Chute at Mall of America's indoor park Nickelodeon Universe contains sections within a large rocky structure and some out in the open.

Splash Mountain at Tokyo Disneyland is based on the animated sequences of Disney's 1946 film Song of the South. It consists of a single trough running in a continuous circuit through the middle of a show building containing Audio-Animatronics characters, with the largest drops and a few turns positioned outside the show building.

Tiana's Bayou Adventure at Magic Kingdom and Disneyland is based on Disney Animation's 2009 film The Princess and the Frog. It includes Audio-Animatronics characters and is a re-theme of the versions of Splash Mountain that were located at those parks, reusing the same flume layout.

Luna Park's Wild River contains a few turns, then a lifthill which holds the riders (usually 4 or 5) upwards for 15 seconds then the log turns left and drops down. The second lifthill lifts up higher with audio playing in the back and then a drop occurs and the riders return.

Dudley Do-Right's Ripsaw Falls at Universal Islands of Adventure is themed to the animated character Dudley Do-Right. The ride was manufactured by Mack Rides and features multiple smaller drops before a 75-foot drop at the end. In addition, the ride is one of the few of its kind to use lap bars as a method of restraining riders.

=== Manufacturers ===
- ABC Rides
- Arrow Dynamics
- Barr Engineering
- Bear Rides
- Big Country Motioneering
- D.P.V. Rides
- Fabbri Group
- Hafema
- Hopkins Rides
- I.E Park
- Intamin
- Interlink
- L&T Systems
- Mack Rides
- Mimafab
- Preston & Barbieri
- Reverchon Industries
- Rides and Fun
- SBF Visa Group
- Schwarzkopf
- Senyo Kogyo
- Soquet
- Van Egdom
- Venture Rides
- WGH Transportation Engineering
- WhiteWater
- Zamperla

== Installations ==
Name	Park	Location	Manufacturer	Opened	Status
Unknown	Funtown Pier	United States	Arrow Development	1977	Removed
Unknown	Bali Festival Park	Indonesia	Hopkins Rides	1996	Removed
Unknown	Varde Sommerland	Denmark	Big Country Motioneering	1990	Removed
Adventure Canyon Log Flume	Buffalo Bill's	United States	Arrow Dynamics	1994	Closed
Adventure River	Antibesland	France	Reverchon Industries	Unknown	Operating
African River	Zoosafari Fasanolandia	Italy	Reverchon Industries	Unknown	Operating
Aguas Turbulentas Hidrovertigo	Parque de la Ciudad	Argentina	Intamin	1987	Closed
Akuatiti	Terra Mítica	Spain	Bear Rides	2000	Operating
Alpine Log Flume	Gulliver's Warrington	United Kingdom	Big Country Motioneering	1989	Operating
Amazon Volcano	VinWonders Phú Quốc	Vietnam	WhiteWater	2022	Operating
American Plunge	Silver Dollar City	United States	Barr Engineering	1981	Operating
Anaconda	Isla Mágica	Spain	Mack Rides	1997	Operating
Anbata Peka	Sofia Land	Bulgaria	L&T Systems	2002	Removed
Aquagaudi	Wiener Prater	Austria	Reverchon Industries	2013	Operating
Aquaman Splashdown; Formerly Yankee Clipper	Six Flags Great America	United States	Arrow Development	1976	Operating
Aserradero	Parque de Atracciones de Madrid	Spain	Zamperla	2006	Operating
Atlantique Sud	Parc du Petit Prince	France	Soquet	2017	Operating
Autosplash	Mirabilandia	Italy	Intamin	1992	Operating
Baby Flum	Didiland	France	Soquet	2018	Operating
Badewannen-Fahrt zum Jungbrunnen	Erlebnispark Tripsdrill	Germany	Mack Rides	2000	Operating
Bamboo Chutes	Story Land	United States	Hopkins Rides	1993	Operating
Bamboo Shoot	Six Flags AstroWorld	United States	Arrow Development	1968	Removed
Bambooz River	Walibi Rhône-Alpes	France	Soquet	2012	Operating
Beaver Creek Log Ride; Formerly Wild River Log Ride	Funland	United Kingdom	L&T Systems	2006	Operating
Beaver Rapids	Lightwater Valley	United Kingdom	Reverchon Industries	1999	Removed
Bedrock River Adventure	Warner Bros. World Abu Dhabi	United Arab Emirates	Unknown	2018	Operating
Biberburg	Familypark Neusiedlersee	Austria	Intamin	2022	Operating
Big Mama	Skyline Park	Germany	Mack Rides	2017	Operating
Big Splash	Wonderland Amusement Park	United States	Hopkins Rides	1980	Operating
Big Splash Log Flume	Western Playland	United States	Hopkins Rides	1982	Removed
Big Timber Log Ride	Enchanted Forest	United States	E&F Miler	1996	Operating
Blizzard Falls	Funland	United Kingdom	L&T Systems	Unknown	Operating
Blue River	Zoomarine	Italy	L&T Systems	2005	Operating
Boat Chute	Lake Winnepesaukah	United States	Carl O. Dixon	1927	Operating
Boji Falls Log Ride	Arnolds Park	United States	Arrow Development	2001	Operating
Bugs' White Water Rapids	Six Flags Fiesta Texas	United States	Hopkins Rides	1998	Operating
Canoa	Italia in Miniatura	Italy	In-house	1991	Operating
Canoes	PortAventura Park	Spain	Zamperla	1995	Operating
Canyon Falls Log Flume	Gillians Wonderland Pier	United States	Hopkins Rides	1992	Closed
Canyon River Log Flume	The Flambards Experience	United Kingdom	Zamperla	1990	Operating
Cascade Falls	Palace Playland	United States	Unknown	Unknown	Operating
Cataratas del Nilo	Terra Mítica	Spain	Mack Rides	2000	Operating
Castoria	Fiabilandia	Italy	Preston & Barbieri	2012	Operating
Cheyenne River	Mer de Sable	France	Soquet	1996	Operating
Chiapas	Phantasialand	Germany	Intamin	2014	Operating
Chicago Log Race	Old Chicago	United States	Arrow Development	1975	Removed
Cliff Drop	Yokohama Cosmoworld	Japan	Senyo Kogyo	1992	Operating
Coal Cracker	Hersheypark	United States	Arrow Development	1973	Operating
Colorado	New Jesolandia	Italy	Reverchon Industries	2009	Operating
Colorado Boat	Gardaland	Italy	Mack Rides	1984	Operating
Colorado Boats	Cavallino Matto	Italy	Preston & Barbieri	1993	Operating
Colorado River	Djurs Sommerland	Denmark	Interlink	1991	Operating
Colorado River	Magic World	France	Interlink	1995	Operating
Concert'O	Walibi Rhône-Alpes	France	Interlink	2013	Operating
Congo Splash	Knuthenborg Safaripark	Denmark	ABC Rides	2014	Operating
Country Fair Falls	Dollywood	United States	Arrow Development	1970	Removed
Crazy River	Walibi Holland	Netherlands	Mack Rides	1994	Operating
Crazy River	Europark	France	Unknown	Unknown	Operating
Crossing Jurassic World	China Dinosaurs Park	China	Unknown	Unknown	Operating
Daredevil Falls	Dollywood	United States	Hopkins Rides	1998	Operating
DinoSplash	Plopsaland	Belgium	Mack Rides	1989	Operating
Descente des Rapides	Mirapolis	France	Mack Rides	1987	Removed
Desperado Plunge	Six Flags Great Escape	United States	Arrow Development	1972/1978	Operating
Dino Island	Legoland Malaysia	Malaysia	ABC Rides	2012	Operating
Dino Splash	Parc Saint-Paul	France	Interlink	2001	Operating
Dragon Falls	Twinlakes Park	United Kingdom	L&T Systems	2011	Operating
Dragon River	Etnaland	Italy	Hafema	2012	Operating
Drakkar; Formerly Rio Grande; Formerly Rivière Sauvage	Walibi Sud-Ouest; Walibi Belgium	France	Unknown	1996; 1978 to 1994	Operating
Drench Falls Log Flume	Blackpool Pleasure Beach	United Kingdom	Arrow Development	1967	Removed
Donau Jump	Wiener Prater	Austria	Reverchon Industries	1991	Removed
Dora's Big River Adventure	Movie Park Germany	Germany	Preston & Barbieri	2008	Operating
Double Splash Flume	Dutch Wonderland	United States	Arrow Development	1977	Operating
Dschungel X-Pedition	Legoland Deutschland	Germany	Intamin	2002	Operating
Dudley Do-Right's Ripsaw Falls	Universal Islands of Adventure	United States	Mack Rides	1999	Operating
Dulcimer Splash; Formerly Flume Zoom	Opryland USA	United States	Arrow Development	1972	Removed
El Aserradero	Six Flags Over Texas	United States	Arrow Development	1963	Operating
El Caimán Bailón	Isla Mágica	Spain	Zamperla	Unknown	Operating
Enchanted Forest Log Flume	Rainbow's End	New Zealand	Unknown	1984	Operating
Escape from Crocodile Creek	Sealife Weymouth	United Kingdom	ABC Rides	2009	Removed
Expedition Zork; Formerly Backstroke	Toverland	Netherlands	Mack Rides	2004	Operating
Fantasy Flume	Fantasy Island	United Kingdom	WGH Transportation Engineering	Unknown	Operating
Flash Back	Walibi Belgium	Belgium	Mack Rides	1995	Operating
Fluch des Pharao	Belantis	Germany	Hafema	2003	Operating
Flume Boat	Merlin's KinderWelt	Czech Republic	Unknown	Unknown	Operating
Flume Ride	Hi Impact Planet	Nigeria	Unknown	Unknown	Operating
Flume Ride	Khan Shatyr	Kazakhstan	Unknown	Unknown	Operating
Flume Ride	Lotte World	South Korea	Intamin	1986	Operating
Flume Ride	Wonderland	United Arab Emirates	Hopkins Rides	1995	Removed
Flume Ride	Al-Rawdah Sharaco Amusement Park	Saudi Arabia	Intamin	1986	Operating
Flume Ride	Kumdori Land	South Korea	Intamin	1993	Removed
Flume Ride	Toshimaen	Japan	Arrow Development	1970	Removed
Flume Ride	Qingdao International Beer City	China	Hopkins Rides	1998	Removed
Flume Ride	Magic Park	Greece	L&T Systems	2001	Operating
Flume Ride	Europark	Italy	Fabbri Group	2007	Operating
Flume Ride	Magic World	Italy	Unknown	Unknown	Removed
Flume-Ride	Zoomarine	Portugal	Unknown	Unknown	Removed
Flumeride	Liseberg	Sweden	Arrow Development	1973	Operating
Flumeride	DaftöLand	Sweden	Interlink	2011	Operating
Flumeride	Kneippbyn	Sweden	Unknown	Unknown	Operating
Fossen	Kongeparken	Norway	ABC Rides	2013	Operating
Frightful Falls	Holiday World	United States	Hopkins Rides	1984	Operating
Gator Falls	Lowry Park Zoo	United States	Unknown	Unknown	Removed
Giant Flume	Knoebels Amusement Resort	United States	Hopkins Rides	1990	Operating
Gold Mine Exploration	Formosan Aboriginal Culture Village	Taiwan	Mack Rides	Unknown	Operating
Grand Canyon	Spreepark	Germany	Mack Rides	1995	Removed
Gran Tikal	Parque de Atracciones de Zaragoza	Spain	Reverchon Industries	Unknown	Operating
Great Expectations Log Flume Ride	Dickens World	United Kingdom	WGH Transportation Engineering	Unknown	Closed
Haunted River	Kings Dominion	United States	Arrow Development	1980	Removed
High Seas	Playland's Castaway Cove	United States	Unknown	Unknown	Operating
Hydrolix	Parc Astérix	France	Reverchon Industries	2014	Operating
Midi Flume Ride	Gloria's Fantasyland	Philippines	Unknown	Unknown	Operating
Indiana Logs	Siam Park City	Thailand	Unknown	1987	Removed
Terra Magma; Formerly Indiana River	Bobbejaanland	Belgium	Intamin	1991	Operating
Jelajah	Trans Studio Indoor Theme Park Bandung inside the Transmart Bandung Supermall	Indonesia	Interlink	2011	Operating
Jet Stream	Six Flags Magic Mountain	United States	Arrow Dynamics	1972	Operating
Jonas Adventure	Beijing Shijingshan Amusement Park	China	Bear Rides	1998	Operating
Jungle Log Jam	Enchanted Kingdom	Philippines	Hopkins Rides	1995	Operating
Jungle River	Drievliet	Netherlands	Reverchon Industries	2001	Operating
Jungle River	Luneur Park	Italy	Rides and Fun	Unknown	Removed
Jungle River	Bayside Pleasure Park	United Kingdom	Reverchon Industries	Unknown	Removed
Redwood Falls	Rides At Adventure Cove in the Columbus Zoo and Aquarium	United States	Hafema	2008	Removed
Jungle Splash; Formerly Wild River	Star City	Philippines	Unknown	Unknown	Operating
Jurassic River	Cavallino Matto	Italy	Technical Park	2018	Operating
Jurassic Island	Trans Studio Cibubur	(Indonesia)	Interlink / Simworx	2019	Operating
Kenton's Cove Keelboat Canal	Kings Island	United States	Arrow Development	1973	Removed
Kinder Wildwasserbahn	Schwaben Park	Germany	ABC Rides	2007	Operating
King Neptune's Revenge	Clementon Amusement Park	United States	Unknown	Unknown	Operating
Klondike Creek	Flamingo Land	United Kingdom	Reverchon Industries	1999	Removed
Kongo River	Hollywoodpark	Germany	Van Egdom	1994	Operating
Koskenlaskurata	Wasalandia	Finland	Mack Rides	1988	Removed
Krokobahn	Familypark Neusiedlersee	Austria	ABC Rides	2006	Operating
Kwai River	PowerLand	Finland	Interlink	2013	Operating
La Cascade	Zygo Park	France	Reverchon Industries	1987	Removed
La Isla	Allou Fun Park	Greece	L&T Systems	2002	Operating
L'Alaska	Tibidabo Amusement Park	Spain	Zamperla	1989	Operating
La Mina d'Or	Tibidabo Amusement Park	Spain	Reverchon Industries	1997	Operating
La Pitoune	La Ronde	Canada	Arrow Development	1967	Removed
La Rivière Canadienne	Le Pal	France	Soquet	1992	Operating
La Rivière Castor	Fraispertuis City	France	Soquet	2014	Operating
La Rivière Des Castors	Mer de Sable	France	Unknown	2007	Operating
La Riviere Emeraude	Fami Parc	France	Reverchon Industries	Unknown	Removed
Legend of the Labyrinth	Lagunasia	Japan	Hopkins Rides	2001	Operating
Lego Canoe	Legoland Billund	Denmark	Unknown	1992	Operating
Le Flum	Fraispertuis City	France	Soquet	1991	Operating
Le Scoot Log Flume	Busch Gardens Williamsburg	United States	Arrow Development	1975	Operating
Les Flobarts	Bagatelle	France	Unknown	2000	Operating
Les Rapides De l'Ouest	Magic Park Land	France	Reverchon Industries	Unknown	Operating
Les Rapides Du Colorado	Lillom	France	Unknown	1985	Removed
Loch Ness Expplorers	Adlabs Imagica	India	I.E. Park	2013	Operating
Lodki Wyspa Skarbow	Energylandia	Poland	SBF Visa Group	Unknown	Operating
Log Chute; Formerly Paul Bunyan's Log Chute	Nickelodeon Universe	United States	Hopkins Rides	1992	Operating
Log Flume	Great Yarmouth Pleasure Beach	United Kingdom	Mimafab	1989	Removed
Log Flume	Gulliver's Matlock Bath	United Kingdom	Big Country Motioneering	1988	Operating
Log Flume	Gulliver's Milton Keynes	United Kingdom	Big Country Motioneering	1999	Operating
Log Flume	Hamanako Pal Pal	Japan	Hopkins Rides	1998	Operating
Log Flume	Rye Playland	United States	Hopkins Rides	1993	Operating
Log Flume	Fantasy Island	United States	Arrow Development	Unknown	Removed
Log Flume; Formerly Over The Falls	Seabreeze Amusement Park	United States	Hopkins Rides	1984	Operating
Log Flume	Silverwood Theme Park	United States	Arrow Development	1987/1990	Operating
Log Flume; Formerly The Ice Mountain Splash; Formerly The Plunge; Formerly The Hoo Hoo Log Flume	Six Flags St. Louis	United States	Arrow Dynamics	1971	Operating
Log Flume	Family Kingdom Amusement Park	United States	Hopkins Rides	1999	Operating
Log Flume	Camden Park	United States	Hopkins Rides	1983	Operating
Log Flume	Lagoon Amusement Park	United States	Arrow Development	1976	Removed
Log Flume	Casino Pier	United States	Unknown	Unknown	Removed
Log Flume	LeSourdsville Lake Amusement Park	United States	Barr Engineering	Unknown	Removed
Log Flume	Myrtle Beach Pavilion	United States	Hopkins Rides	1984	Removed
Log Flume	Hunt's Pier	United States	Arrow Development	1970	Removed
Log Flume	Magic Harbor	United States	Arrow Development	1969	Removed
Log Flume; Formerly Cataratas	Blackpool South Pier	United Kingdom	Reverchon Industries	2010	Operating
Log Flume	Barry Island Pleasure Park	United Kingdom	Reverchon Industries	1980	Removed
Log Flume	Camelot Theme Park	United Kingdom	Mimafab	1986	Removed
Log Flume	Southport Pleasureland	United Kingdom	Arrow Development	1968	Removed
Log Flume	Drayton Manor Resort	United Kingdom	Reverchon Industries	1981	Removed
Log Flume	Frontierland	United Kingdom	Arrow Dynamics	1982	Removed
Log Flume	Rotunda Amusement Park	United Kingdom	Big Country Motioneering	1987	Removed
Log Ride	Pontchartrain Beach	United States	Arrow Development	1974	Removed
Loggers Leap	Thorpe Park	United Kingdom	Mack Rides	1989	Closed
Loggers Leap	Loudoun Castle	United Kingdom	Reverchon Industries	1995	Removed
Logger's Revenge	Santa Cruz Beach Boardwalk	United States	Arrow Development	1977	Operating
Logger's Run	California's Great America	United States	Arrow Development	1976	Removed
Logger's Run	Michigan's Adventure	United States	Arrow Dynamics	1983	Operating
Logger's Run	Six Flags Great America	United States	Arrow Development	1976	Operating
Log Jam	Joyland Amusement Park	United States	Hopkins Rides	1985	Removed
Log Jamboree	Six Flags Over Georgia	United States	Arrow Dynamics	1968	Operating
Log Jammer	Kennywood	United States	Arrow Dynamics	1975	Removed
Log Jammer	Kiddieland Amusement Park	United States	Hopkins Rides	1992	Removed
Log Jammer	Six Flags Magic Mountain	United States	Arrow Development	1971	Removed
Log Ride	Gold Reef City	South Africa	Unknown	Unknown	Operating
Log Ride	Castle Park	United States	Hopkins Rides	1989	Operating
Lo Strozzagorgo	Miragica	Italy	SBF Visa Group	2009	Operating
Lucky River	Parc Spirou	France	Hafema	2019	Operating
MamiWata	Fantasiana Erlebnispark Straßwalchen	Austria	Hafema	2015	Operating
Maya Splash	Plopsa Coo	Belgium	Mack Rides	1986	Operating
Menhir Express	Parc Astérix	France	Hopkins Rides	1995	Operating
Mighty Mountain Flume Adventure	Leofoo Village Theme Park	Taiwan	Intamin	1995	Operating
Mill Race	Cedar Point	United States	Arrow Development	1963	Removed
Mill River	PowerLand	Finland	Zamperla	2005	Operating
Mini Flum	Europark	France	Interlink	2011	Operating
Mini Flume Ride	Parque de Atracciones de Madrid	Spain	Unknown	1991	Removed
Mini Rapide	Mirabilandia	Italy	L&T Systems	2001	Operating
Mississippi Boat	Leolandia	Italy	Zamperla	1998	Operating
Monkey Falls	Ratanga Junction	South Africa	Hopkins Rides	1998	Removed
Montaña de Agua	Pola Park	Spain	Reverchon Industries	Unknown	Removed
Mühlbach-Fahrt	Erlebnispark Tripsdrill	Germany	ABC Rides	2003	Operating
Mystery River Log Flume	Frontier City	United States	Hopkins Rides	1983	Operating
Newton	Skara Sommarland	Sweden	Bear Rides	2003	Operating
Niagara	PPS Park Platja d'Aro	Spain	Unknown	Unknown	Operating
Niagara gara	Dunia Fantasi	Indonesia	Unknown	Unknown	Operating
Niagara Falls	Sunway Lagoon	Malaysia	Unknown	Unknown	Operating
Nightmare Niagara	The American Adventure	United Kingdom	Big Country Motioneering / WGH Transportation Engineering	1987	Removed
Nilen	Dyreparken	Norway	Unknown	Unknown	Operating
Ohio River Adventure	Kentucky Kingdom	United States	Arrow Dynamics	1987	Removed
Old Hickory Log Flume	Libertyland	United States	Arrow Development	1976	Removed
Old Mill Scream	Fantasy Island	United States	Unknown	1986	Removed
Old No. 2 Logging Company	Magic Springs and Crystal Falls	United States	Bradley & Kaye	1978	Operating
Over The Edge	MGM Grand Adventures Theme Park	United States	Intamin	1993	Removed
Ozarka Splash; Formerly Cypress Plunge	Six Flags New Orleans	United States	Hopkins Rides	2000	Closed
Paul Bunyan's Loggin' Toboggan	Idlewild and Soak Zone	United States	Unknown	Unknown	Operating
Papea Flume; River Splash	Papéa Parc; Legendia	France	Reverchon Industries	2010; 2008 to 2009	Operating
Pepsi Plunge; Formerly Gold Rush	Geauga Lake	United States	Unknown	1972	Removed
Pinguine! Abenteuer Antarktis	Sea Life Abenteuer Park	Germany	ABC Rides	2013	Removed
Piranha	Southport Pleasureland	United Kingdom	Reverchon Industries	2012	Operating
Pirat River	Pirat Parc	France	Reverchon Industries	Unknown	Operating
Pirate Adventure	Drayton Manor Resort	United Kingdom	Mack Rides	1990	Closed
Pirate Adventure	Lunapark Fréjus	France	Reverchon Industries	Unknown	Operating
Pirate Falls Treasure Quest; Formerly Pirate Falls Dynamite Drench; Formerly Pirate Falls	Legoland Windsor	United Kingdom	Zamperla	1996	Operating
Pirateninsel	Skyline Park	Germany	Mack Rides	2006	Removed
Pirateninsel	Eifelpark	Germany	Mack Rides	2018	Operating
Pirate River	Barry Island Pleasure Park	United Kingdom	Reverchon Industries	2016	Operating
Pirate's Plunge	Galveston Island Historic Pleasure Pier	United States	Interlink	2012	Operating
Pirates Plunge	Pirate Adventure Park	(Republic of Ireland) Ireland	Zamperla	Unknown	Operating
Piratfisken	Djurs Sommerland	Denmark	ABC Rides	2009	Operating
Pirati Splash	Leolandia	Italy	Zamperla	2005	Operating
Poland Spring Plunge; Formerly Red River Rapids	Six Flags New England	United States	Reverchon Industries	1979	Removed
Policy Pond Saw Mill Log Flume	Canobie Lake Park	United States	Hopkins Rides	1982	Operating
Pottwal	Potts Park	Germany	Bear Rides	1997	Operating
Race For Your Life Charlie Brown; Formerly The Wild Thornberrys River Adventure; Formerly Kings Mills Log Flume	Kings Island	United States	Arrow Development	1972	Operating
Rafting	Mtatsminda Park	(Georgia (country)) Georgia	Interlink	2007	Operating
Raging River	Ocean Park	Hong Kong	Arrow Huss	1984	Removed
Raging River	Adventure Island	United Kingdom	Interlink	1996	Removed
Raging River Log Flume	Paultons Park	United Kingdom	Reverchon Industries	1999	Operating
Rapid Toon's	Luna park Cape d'Agde	France	Unknown	Unknown	Operating
Raskapuska	Beto Carrero World	Brazil	Unknown	Unknown	Operating
Rio Salto	Walibi Belgium	Belgium	Unknown	1986	Removed
Río Bravo	Parque Warner Madrid	Spain	Intamin	2002	Operating
Rio Bravo	Bracalandia	Portugal	Reverchon Industries	1990	Removed
Rio Bravo	Magikland	Portugal	Unknown	Unknown	Operating
Ripsaw Falls	Attractiepark Slagharen	Netherlands	Reverchon Industries	1992	Operating
Riptide	Six Flags Great Adventure	United States	Arrow Development	1975	Removed
River Rapids Log Flume	Adventureland	United States	Unknown	1974	Removed
River Slide	Azurpark	France	Reverchon Industries	Unknown	Operating
River Splash; Formerly Ch'Plouf	Bagatelle	France	Reverchon Industries	1976	Operating
Rio Do Café	Bellewaerde	Belgium	Reverchon Industries	1980	Operating
Rivière Canadienne	Nigloland	France	Mack Rides	1989	Operating
Rivière Canadienne	Walibi Rhône-Alpes	France	Unknown	Unknown	Removed
Rivière des Chèvres	Jardin d'Acclimatation	France	Reverchon Industries	2018	Operating
Riviere Sauvage	Didiland	France	Soquet	1995	Operating
Rivière Sauvage	Toison d'Or	France	Mack Rides	1990	Removed
Rivière Sauvage	Walygator Parc	France	Soquet	1992	Operating
Roaring Creek Log Flume	Silverwood	United States	Arrow Dynamics / Hopkins Rides	1990	Operating
Roaring Springs	Lowry Park Zoo	United States	Unknown	2018	Operating
Rocky Hollow Log Ride	Dreamworld	Australia	Dreamworld	1981	Removed
Rocky Mountain Rapids	Cliff's Amusement Park	United States	Hopkins Rides	1985	Operating
Rocky River Falls	Wicksteed Park	United Kingdom	Big Country Motioneering	2008	Operating
Rocky's Rapids	Indiana Beach	United States	Unknown	Unknown	Operating
Rocky Slider	Fuji-Q Highland	Japan	Arrow Dynamics	1974	Removed
Saugreen Lumber Mill	Centreville Amusement Park	Canada	Arrow Development	1972	Operating
Sawmill River	Crystal Beach Park	Canada	Hopkins Rides	1981	Removed
Saw Mill Log Flume	Six Flags Great Adventure	United States	Arrow Development	1974	Operating
Saw Mill Plunge	Lake Compounce	United States	Arrow Dynamics	1986	Operating
Seal Falls	Paultons Park	United Kingdom	Zamperla	2002	Operating
Shenandoah Lumber Company	Kings Dominion	United States	Arrow Development	1975	Operating
Shoot D Chute	Celebration City	United States	Unknown	Unknown	Removed
Shoot The Chute	Beijing Shijingshan Amusement Park	China	Unknown	Unknown	Operating
Shoot-the-Rapids	Cedar Point	United States	In-house with Arrow Development hardware	1967	Removed
Shoot the Rapids	Cedar Point	United States	Intamin	2010	Removed
Silverforsen	DaftöLand	Sweden	Interlink	2011	Operating
Silver River Flume	PortAventura Park	Spain	Mack Rides	1995	Operating
Sissiboo Sizzler; Formerly Cariboo Log Chute	Upper Clements Parks; Expo 86	Canada	Intamin	1989; 1986 to 1988	Removed
Skull Mountain	Six Flags America	United States	Intamin	1997	Removed
Skull Rock; Formerly Camelot Cascade Log Flume	Oakwood Theme Park; Camelot Theme Park	United Kingdom	Mimafab	2013; 1986 to 2012	Operating
Sparklett's Splash	State Fair of Texas	United States	Unknown	Unknown	Operating
Splash	Frontier City	United States	Hopkins Rides	Unknown	Operating
Splash	Bosque Mágico	Mexico	Hopkins Rides	1993	Removed
Splash	Luna Park Palavas-les-Flots	France	Unknown	Unknown	Operating
Splash Boat	East Park, Kingston upon Hull	United Kingdom	Charles Wicksteed	1929	Operating
Splashdown	Castles N' Coasters	United States	Hopkins Rides	1991	Operating
Splash Kids	Walygator Parc	France	Zamperla	1989	Operating
Splash Mountain	Disneyland	United States	Hopkins Rides	1989	Removed
Splash Mountain	Tokyo Disneyland	Japan	Hopkins Rides	1992	Operating
Splash Mountain	Magic Kingdom	United States	Hopkins Rides	1992	Removed
Splash Mountain	OK Corral	France	Reverchon Industries	2001	Operating
Splash-o-Saure	Parc du Bocasse	France	Soquet	2017	Operating
Splash River	La Coccinelle	France	Soquet	2015	Operating
Splash River	Happyland	Switzerland	Mack Rides	2006	Operating
Spleshi	Hopi Hari	Brazil	Unknown	Unknown	Operating
Splinter	Blue Bayou and Dixie Landin'	United States	Unknown	Unknown	Operating
Splinter	Elitch Gardens	United States	Arrow Development	1978	Removed
Splish Splash	Allou Fun Park	Greece	Unknown	Unknown	Operating
Splyw Kopalnia Zlota	Energylandia	Poland	SBF Visa Group	2014	Operating
Stanley Falls	Busch Gardens Tampa	United States	Arrow Development	1973	Removed
Stonewash Creek	Phantasialand	Germany	Unknown	1992	Removed
Stormforce 10	Drayton Manor Resort	United Kingdom	Bear Rides	1999	Operating
Sturmfahrt der Drachenboote	Hansa-Park	Germany	L&T Systems	2007	Operating
Sungai Rejang Flume Ride	Genting Highlands	Malaysia	Unknown	Unknown	Removed
Super Splash	Dream World	Thailand	Hopkins Rides	1995	Operating
Super Splash	Hansa-Park	Germany	Intamin	1986	Operating
Tchibum	Beto Carrero World	Brazil	Unknown	Unknown	Operating
Texas Splashdown	SeaWorld San Antonio	United States	Arrow Development	1987/1991	Removed
The Big Splash	Rainbow Springs	New Zealand	Intamin	2012	Operating
The Flume	Alton Towers	United Kingdom	Mack Rides	1981	Removed
The Flume	Playland	Canada	Reverchon Industries	1985	Operating
The Log Flume	Miracle Strip Amusement Park	United States	Arrow Development	1972	Removed
The Plunge	Aussie World	Australia	Unknown	2011	Operating
The Rugrats' Lost River; Formerly Beaver Creek Log Flume	Blackpool Pleasure Beach	United Kingdom	Arrow Dynamics	1992	Operating
Thunder Creek Mountain	Dorney Park	United States	Barr Engineering	1982	Operating
Thunder Falls	Crealy Great Adventure Park Cornwall	United Kingdom	Unknown	Unknown	Operating
Thunder Falls	Fort Fun	United Kingdom	Interlink	2007	Operating
Thunder Falls	Everland	South Korea	WhiteWater	2016	Operating
Thunder Falls Log Flume	Funtown Splashtown USA	United States	Hopkins Rides	1984	Operating
Thunder Rapids	Six Flags Darien Lake	United States	Arrow Huss	1981	Removed
Thunder River	Waldameer & Water World	United States	Hopkins Rides	1996	Operating
Tiana's Bayou Adventure	Magic Kingdom	United States	Hopkins Rides	2024	Operating
Tiana's Bayou Adventure	Disneyland	United States	Hopkins Rides	2024	Operating
Tidal Wave	Crealy Great Adventure Park Devon	United Kingdom	L&T Systems	2003	Operating
Tiger Rock; Formerly Dragon Falls; Formerly Dragon River	Chessington World of Adventures	United Kingdom	Mack Rides	1987	Operating
Timber Falls	Calaway Park	Canada	Hopkins Rides	1983	Removed
Timber Falls	Calaway Park	Canada	WhiteWater	2014	Operating
Timber Falls Log Flume	Pleasurewood Hills	United Kingdom	Reverchon Industries	1992	Operating
Timber Mountain Log Ride	Knott's Berry Farm	United States	Arrow Development	1969	Operating
Timber Splash	Kingoland	France	Reverchon Industries	2017	Operating
Timber Wolf Howling Log Flume	Timber Falls Adventure Park	United States	Hopkins Rides	1994	Operating
Tiny Timbers	Hersheypark	United States	Venture Rides	1989	Removed
Tivoli Agua	Tivoli World	Spain	Unknown	Unknown	Operating
Tømmerstupet	Tusenfryd	Norway	Arrow Dynamics	1988	Operating
Træstammerne	Fårup Sommerland	Denmark	Big Country Motioneering	1991	Operating
Treasure Falls	Legoland California	United States	Unknown	Unknown	Removed
Tronchi	Edenlandia	Italy	Unknown	Unknown	Removed
Tronchi sull'acqua	Safari Park	Italy	L&T Systems	2007	Operating
Troncos	Parque Mundo Aventura	Colombia	Unknown	Unknown	Operating
Troncosaurus	Movieland Park	Italy	L&T Systems	2003	Operating
Troncos Veloces	Mundo Fantasía	Spain	Unknown	Unknown	Operating
Tukkijoki	Särkänniemi	Finland	Reverchon Industries	1983	Operating
Turtle Splash	Barry's Amusements	United Kingdom	I.E. Park	2006	Removed
Twin Mercury	Space World	Japan	Hopkins Rides	1999	Removed
Tiroler Wildwasserbahn	Europa-Park	Germany	Mack Rides	1978	Operating
V12 Enter the Engine	Ferrari World Abu Dhabi	United Arab Emirates	Unknown	2010	Removed
Vadvizi Utazas	Vidam Park	Hungary	Reverchon Industries	2002	Removed
Valhalla	Blackpool Pleasure Beach	United Kingdom	Intamin	2000	Operating
Vandrotten	BonBon-Land	Denmark	In-house	1995	Operating
Vandrutschebanen	Bakken	Denmark	Reverchon Industries	Unknown	Operating
Viking River Rapids Ride	VinWonders Phú Quốc	Vietnam	WhiteWater	2022	Operating
Viking Voyage	Emerald Park	(Republic of Ireland) Ireland	Interlink	2017	Operating
Viking Voyager	Worlds of Fun	United States	Arrow Development	1973	Operating
Viking's Revenge Flume Ride	Sea World	Australia	Unknown	1978	Removed
Volcano Adventure	Lihpao Land	Taiwan	Hopkins Rides	2002	Operating
Vulcano Rapids	Gulliverlandia	Italy	Unknown	2002	Operating
Wasserbob	Panorama Park	Germany	Unknown	1979	Removed
Water Chut	Luna Park Marseillan Plage	France	Unknown	Unknown	Operating
Water Chute	Amigoland	France	Unknown	Unknown	Operating
Water Chute	Harbour Park	United Kingdom	D.P.V. Rides	2007	Operating
Water Chute	Peasholm Park, Scarborough	United Kingdom	Unknown	1932	Operating
Waterchute	Wicksteed Park	United Kingdom	Charles Wicksteed	1926	Operating
Waterfall Flume Ride	OCT East	China	Bear Rides	Unknown	Operating
Water Flume	Astroland	United States	Arrow Development	1964	Removed
White Lightnin' Log Flume	Bell's Amusement Park	United States	Arrow Development	Unknown	Removed
White Water Express	Beech Bend Park	United States	Reverchon Industries	2002	Operating
White Water Landing	Cedar Point	United States	Arrow Dynamics	1982	Removed
White Water Log Flume	Codona's Amusement Park	United Kingdom	Reverchon Industries	Unknown	Operating
White Water Log Flume	M&Ds Scotland's Theme Park	United Kingdom	Reverchon Industries	1998	Operating
Wickie Splash; Formerly Teufelsfässer	Holiday Park	Germany	Mack Rides	1992	Operating
Wild-Crazy Flume	Lihpao Land	Taiwan	Hopkins Rides	1999	Operating
Wild River	Luna Park	United States	Unknown	Unknown	Operating
Wild River	Joyland Amusement Park	United States	Unknown	Unknown	Operating
Wild River	Fun Forest Amusement Park	United States	Unknown	Unknown	Removed
Wild River	Fort Fun Abenteuerland	Germany	Mack Rides	1979	Operating
Wild River	Spreepark	Germany	Reverchon Industries	1990	Removed
Wild River	Clarence Pier	United Kingdom	Reverchon Industries	Unknown	Operating
Wild Ricer	Tir Prince Fun Park	United Kingdom	Reverchon Industries	Unknown	Operating
Wild River Log Flume	Botton's Pleasure Beach	United Kingdom	Reverchon Industries	2004	Operating
Wild River Log Flume	Brighton Pier	United Kingdom	Reverchon Industries	2000	Operating
Wild Thornberry's River Adventure; Formerly Powder Keg	Carowinds	United States	Arrow Development	1973	Removed
Wilderness Adventure	Ontario Place	Canada	Unknown	Unknown	Removed
Wildwash Creek	Phantasialand	Germany	Unknown	1992	Removed
Wildwasserbahn	Hansa-Park	Germany	Mack Rides	1977	Operating
Wildwasserbahn	Jaderpark	Germany	unknown	1996	Operating
Wildwasserbahn	Rasti-Land	Germany	Unknown	1981	Operating
Wildwasserbahn	Taunus Wunderland	Germany	Mack Rides	2001	Operating
Wildwasserbahn	Conny-Land	Switzerland	Zamperla	1991	Operating
Wildwasserbahn	Traumland auf der BärenHöhle	Germany	ABC Rides	2014	Operating
Wildwasserbahn	Kids-Dinoworld	Germany	ABC Rides	2005	Operating
Wildwasserbahn	Freizeitpark Plohn	Germany	Mack Rides	1999	Operating
Wildwasserbahn	Serengeti Park	Germany	Mack Rides	1994	Operating
Wildwasserbahn	Freizeit-Land Geiselwind	Germany	Reverchon Industries	1997	Operating
Wildwasserbahn	Bayern Park	Germany	Reverchon Industries	1997	Operating
Wildwasserbahn	Churpfalzpark	Germany	Unknown	1995	Operating
Wildwasserbahn	Erlebnispark Schloss Thurn	Germany	Reverchon Industries	1996	Operating
Wildwasserbahn	Eulenspiegelpark	Germany	Schwarzkopf	1982	Removed
Wildwasserbahn	Kernie's Familienpark	Germany	Zamperla	2001	Operating
Wildwasserbahn	Magic Park	Germany	Big Country Motioneering	2003	Operating
Wildwasserbahn	Phantasialand	Germany	Unknown	1974	Removed
Wildwasserbahn	Schwaben Park	Germany	L&T Systems	1998	Operating
Wildwasserbahn	Schwarzwaldpark	Germany	L&T Systems	2004	Removed
Wildwasserbahn I	Heide Park	Germany	Mack Rides	1980	Operating
Wildwasserbahn II	Heide Park	Germany	Schwarzkopf	1990	Removed
Wildwasser Trip	Traumlandpark	Germany	Schwarzkopf	1987	Removed
Wildwaterbaan	Mondo Verde	Netherlands	Reverchon Industries	2017	Operating
Wildwaterbaan	Kinderstad Heerlen	Netherlands	Unknown	Unknown	Operating
Wild Water Log Flume	Brean Leisure Park	United Kingdom	Reverchon Industries	Unknown	Operating
Wild Waterval; Formerly Canadian River	Avonturenpark Hellendoorn	Netherlands	Mack Rides	1982	Operating
Wild Water Slide	Bobbejaanland	Belgium	Intamin	1980	Operating
Wild West Falls Adventure Ride	Warner Bros. Movie World	Australia	Hopkins Rides	1998	Operating
Wonder Drop	Tokyo Dome City	Japan	Hopkins Rides	2001	Operating
Woodchuck Run; Cahaba Falls	Alabama Splash Adventure	United States	Arrow Dynamics	1998	Removed
Yankee Clipper	California's Great America	United States	Arrow Development	1976	Removed
Ye Olde Log Flume	Valleyfair	United States	Unknown	1979	Removed
Yule Log	Santa's Village	United States	Hopkins Rides	1983	Operating
Zambeze; Formerly Blue Splash	Magikland; Feira Popular	Portugal	Reverchon Industries	2010; Unknown	Removed
Zambezi Water Splash	West Midlands Safari Park	United Kingdom	Reverchon Industries	1990	Operating
Zoom Phloom	Morey's Piers	United States	Hopkins Rides	1985	Operating
Zumba Flume	Canada's Wonderland	Canada	Unknown	1981	Removed
Zum Rittersturz	Wild- und Freizeitpark Klotten/Cochem	Germany	ABC Rides	2012	Operating

== See also ==
- Old Mill (ride)
- Log flume
