= Westport Adventure Park =

Irish theme park

Coordinates: 53.80619°N 9.53751°W

Westport Adventure Park is a small activity park and tourist attraction located beside Westport House in Westport, Ireland. The activity park opened in 2024 on the site of the former Pirate Adventure Park. The previous Pirate Adventure Park permanently closed in September 2023. The new adventure park cost 5 million Euros to develop and was opened by Irish Minister Alan Dillon.

== Current Activities ==
- Giant Swing
- Zip Lines
- Multi-wall climbing zone

== Old Pirate Adventure Park ==
Pirate Adventure Park was home to the first flume ride in Ireland (Pirates Plunge). The Park was Pirate themed due to Wesport House's association with Grace O'Malley. The Park was developed by The 11th Marquess of Sligo on the grounds of Westport House. The Pirate Park closed in 2023 after some 50 years of operation.

=== Former Rides and Activities ===
- Pirates Plunge - Flume Ride
- The Pirate Ship
- Pirates Den (Indoor soft play area)
- Treasure Island Express
- Pitch n'Putt
- The White Swan (pedal boats)
- Tennis

== See also ==
- Westport House
