= Timber Mountain Log Ride =

Attraction at Knott's Berry Farm

Coordinates: 33.8452°N 118.0000°W

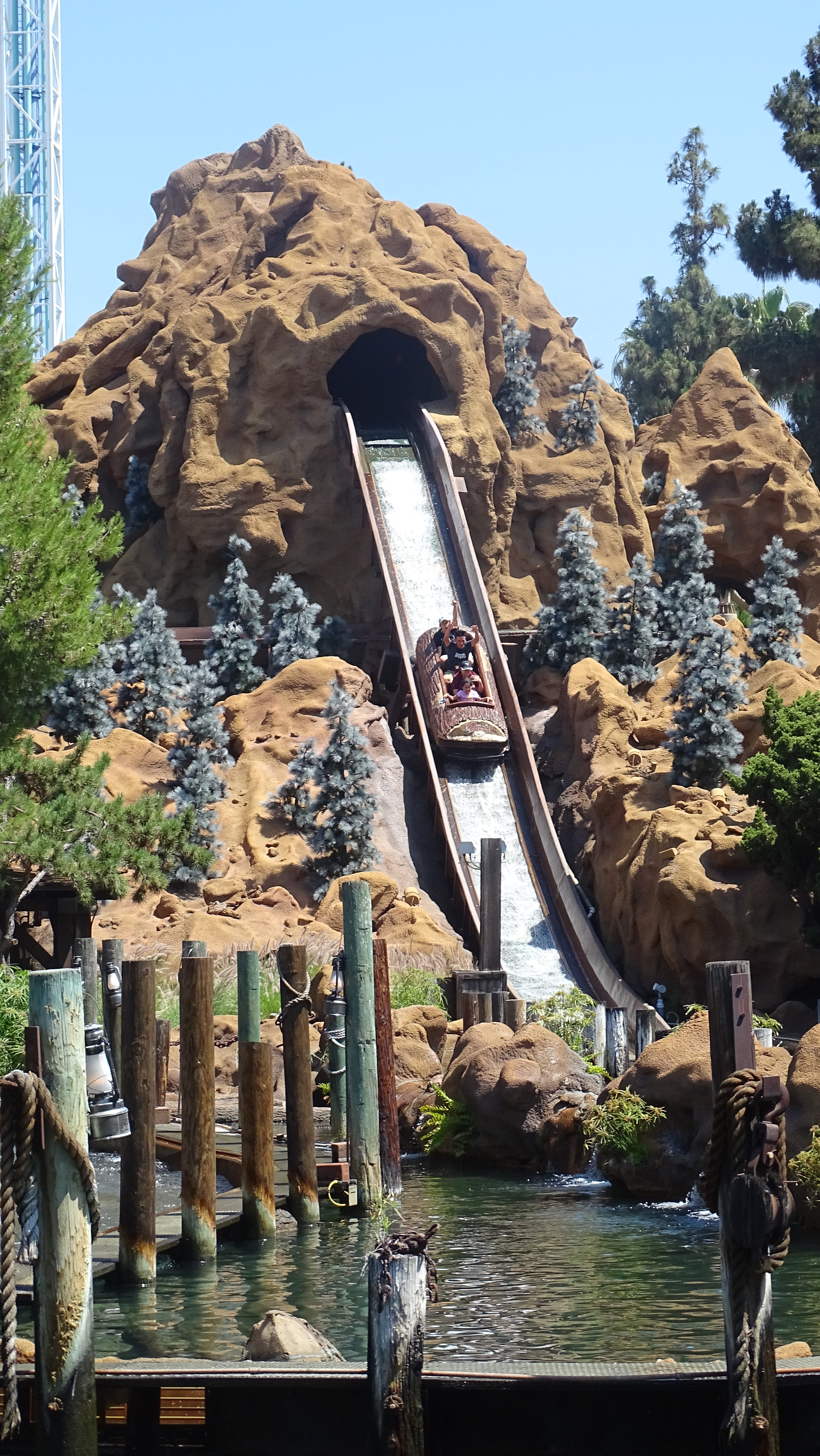
- The Timber Mountain Log Ride in 2019

Knott's Berry Farm
- Area: Ghost Town
- Status: Operating
- Cost: US$3,500,000
- Opening date: July 11, 1969

General statistics
- Type: Log flume
- Manufacturer: Arrow Dynamics
- Designer: Bud Hurlbut; Garner Holt (2013 renovation)
- Height: 85 ft (26 m)
- Drop: 42 ft (13 m)
- Length: 1,200 m (3,900 ft)
- Capacity: 1,300 an hour (36 logs) riders per hour
- Height restriction: 36 in (91 cm)
- Animatronics: 63
- Theme: Calico Logging
- Fast Lane available
- Wheelchair accessible
- Must transfer from wheelchair

The Timber Mountain Log Ride is a themed log flume water dark ride at Knott's Berry Farm in Buena Park, California, United States. The ride is themed after the Knott's Calico Ghost Town. It is one of the oldest log flumes in the United States and is one of the most popular rides at the park. In 2013, the ride received a major refurbishment and celebrated its 50th anniversary on July 11, 2019.

== History ==
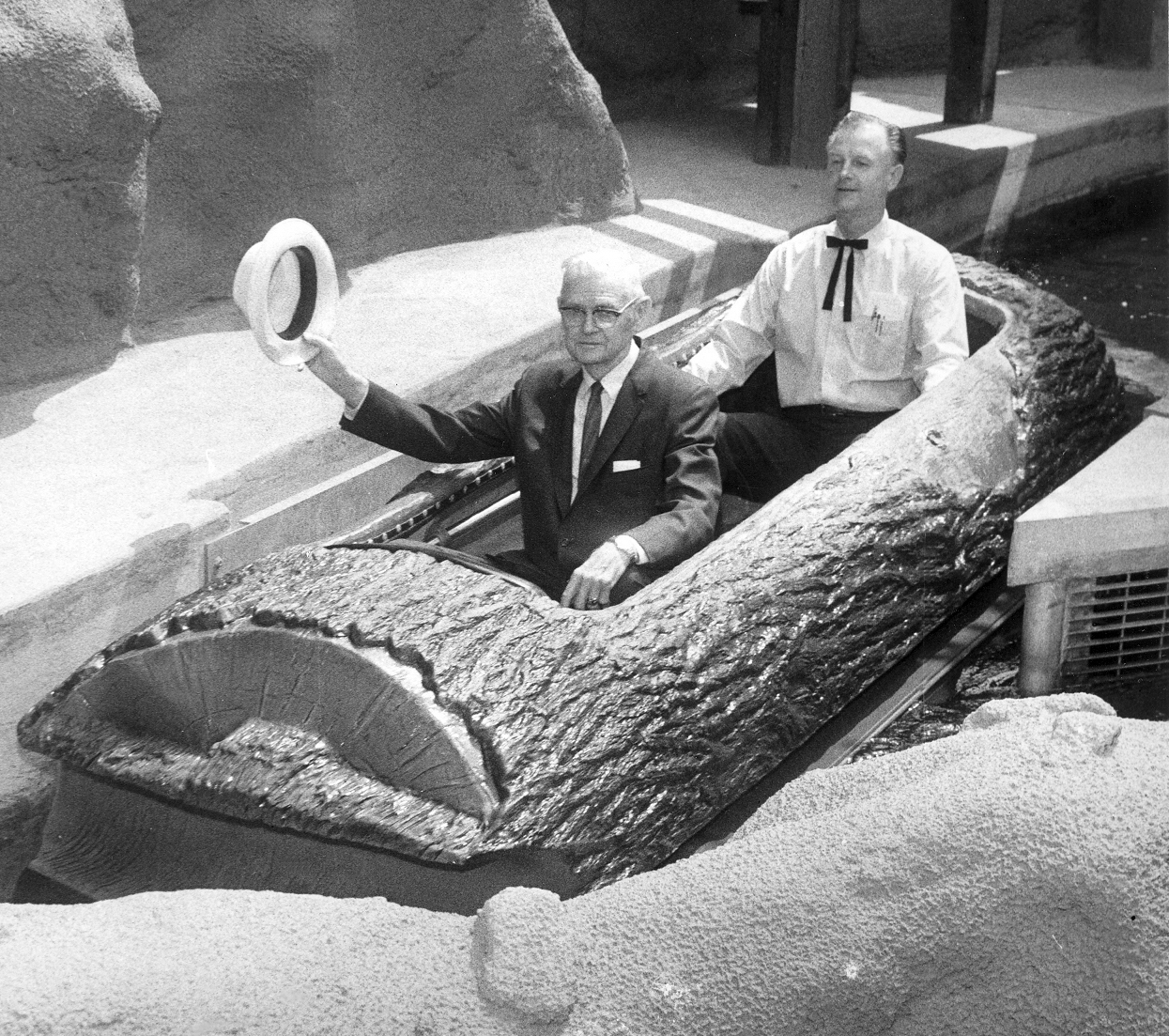
Walter Knott and Bud Hurlbut ride the Timber Mountain Log Ride in 1969

The original concept of the Timber Mountain Log Ride was not a log flume, but rather a roller coaster which appeared to float in a trough. However, after discussions with Arrow Development co-founders Ed Morgan and Karl Bacon, the ride's designer Bud Hurlbut chose to use a log flume ride system. The development of scenes throughout the ride saw Walter Knott approve the ride for construction. The initial $3.5 million cost for the ride was funded by the Hurlbut Amusement Company, with the ride later being sold to the park.

Timber Mountain Log Ride opened on July 11, 1969, with John Wayne on its inaugural ride.

During December 2012, Knott's Berry Farm decided to give the attraction a major overhaul and upgrade. This was beginning of a major change in the park's direction with moving back into themed attractions. The park's owner, Cedar Fair, had originally planned to add another major roller coaster in Knott's Ghost Town area. However, with a change in leadership at the park and Cedar Fair, it was decided to cancel the plans for another roller coaster. Instead, Knott's used those funds to begin a major refurbishment and upgrade to the Timber Mountain Log Ride.

On January 6, 2013, the ride closed to undergo a five-month renovation done by Garner Holt Productions to include animatronic figures and new scenes, while retaining its theme of a lumber camp. The park's in-house staff also assisted in the renovation of the ride by adding roughly 100 sequoia trees, a distinctive feature of the mountain. The ride reopened on May 31, 2013.

On July 11, 2019, the park celebrated the 50th anniversary of the Timber Mountain Log Ride. As part of the celebration, 2 new animatronics were added (designed by Garner Holt) and all 30 logs were retrofitted with individual seats (similar to Tiana's Bayou Adventure at nearby Disneyland) as opposed to the previous lap sitting seat design. Most of the logs feature 3 or 4 individual seats. Another update made to the ride was the addition of a soundtrack by Krazy Kirk and the Hillbillies.

== Ride ==
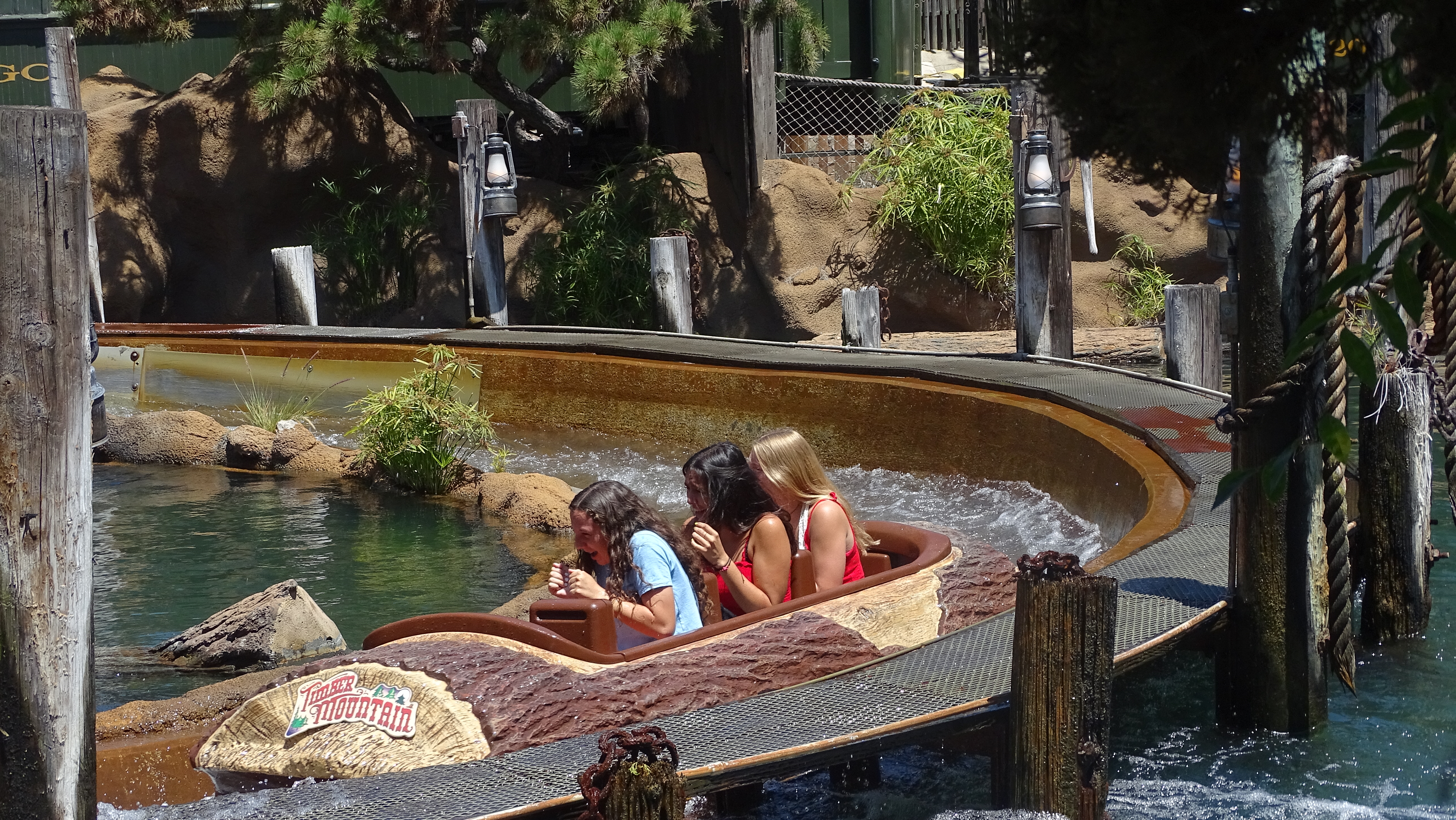
Riders getting splashed on the Timber Mountain Log Ride.

Originally known as the "Calico Log Ride" (considered groundbreaking in its time) it takes riders through a 330-foot long mountain with a theme of a 19th-century lumber camp. The ride is housed in an eight-story building that contains 24,000 gallons of water and finishes in a 42-foot free fall.

The ride features 24 animal animatronic and 39 human figure animatronic figures. The ride's forest scenes (2nd and 4th) feature a distinctive pinecone smell, giving riders the experience of an authentic forest setting.

== Photo Gallery ==
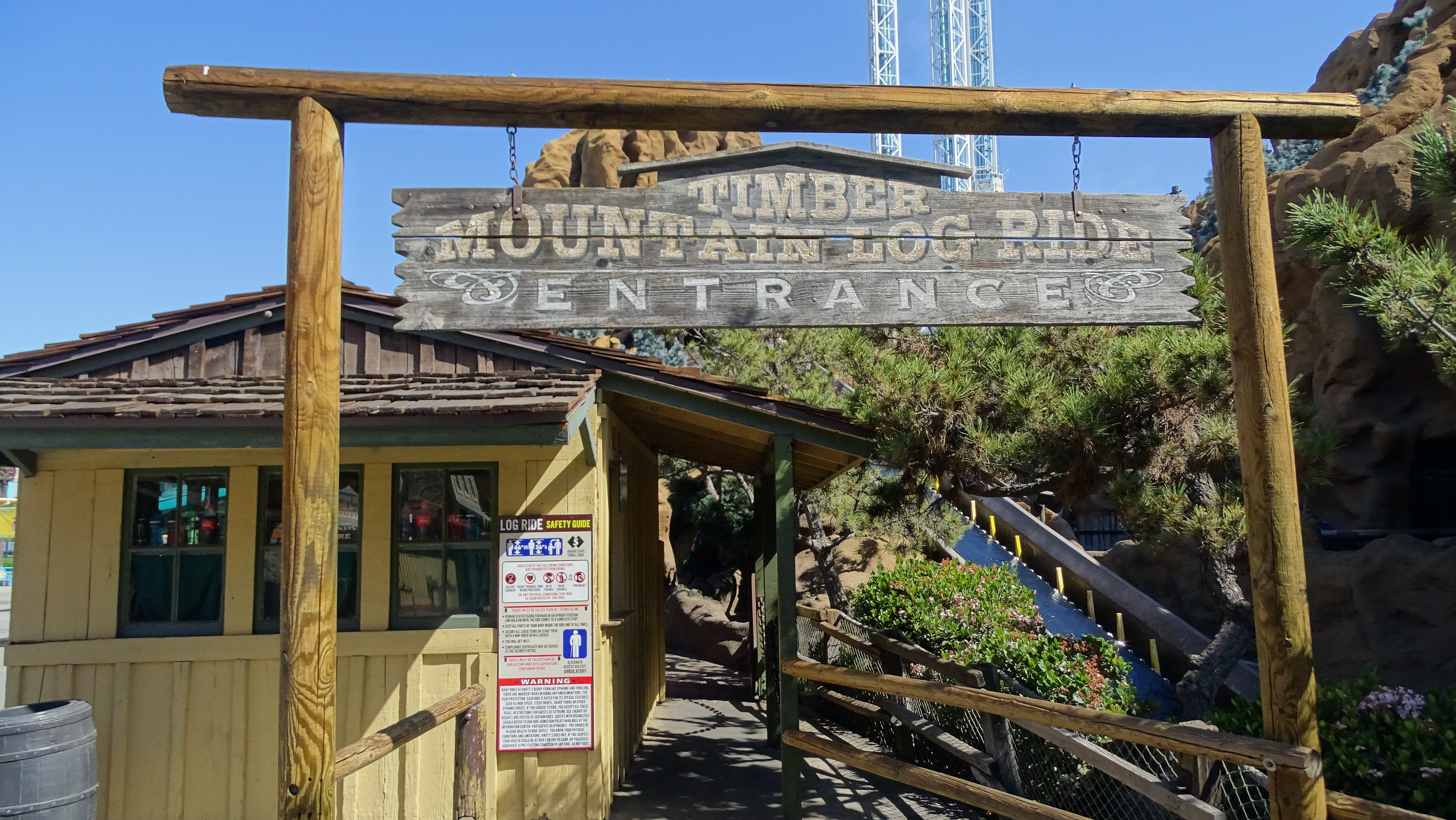
Timber Mountain Log Ride's Entrance.

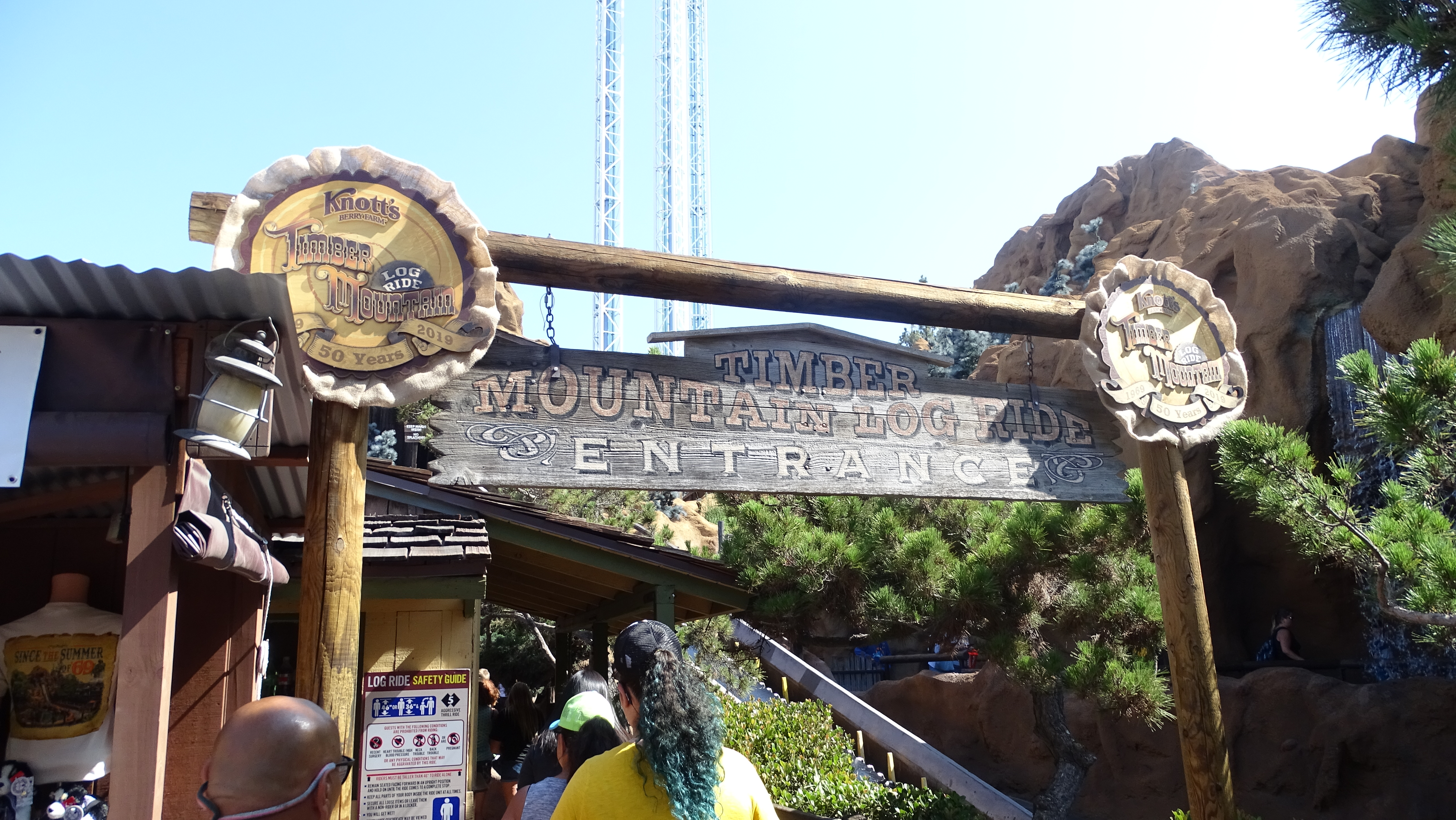
The entrance during the ride's 50th anniversary.

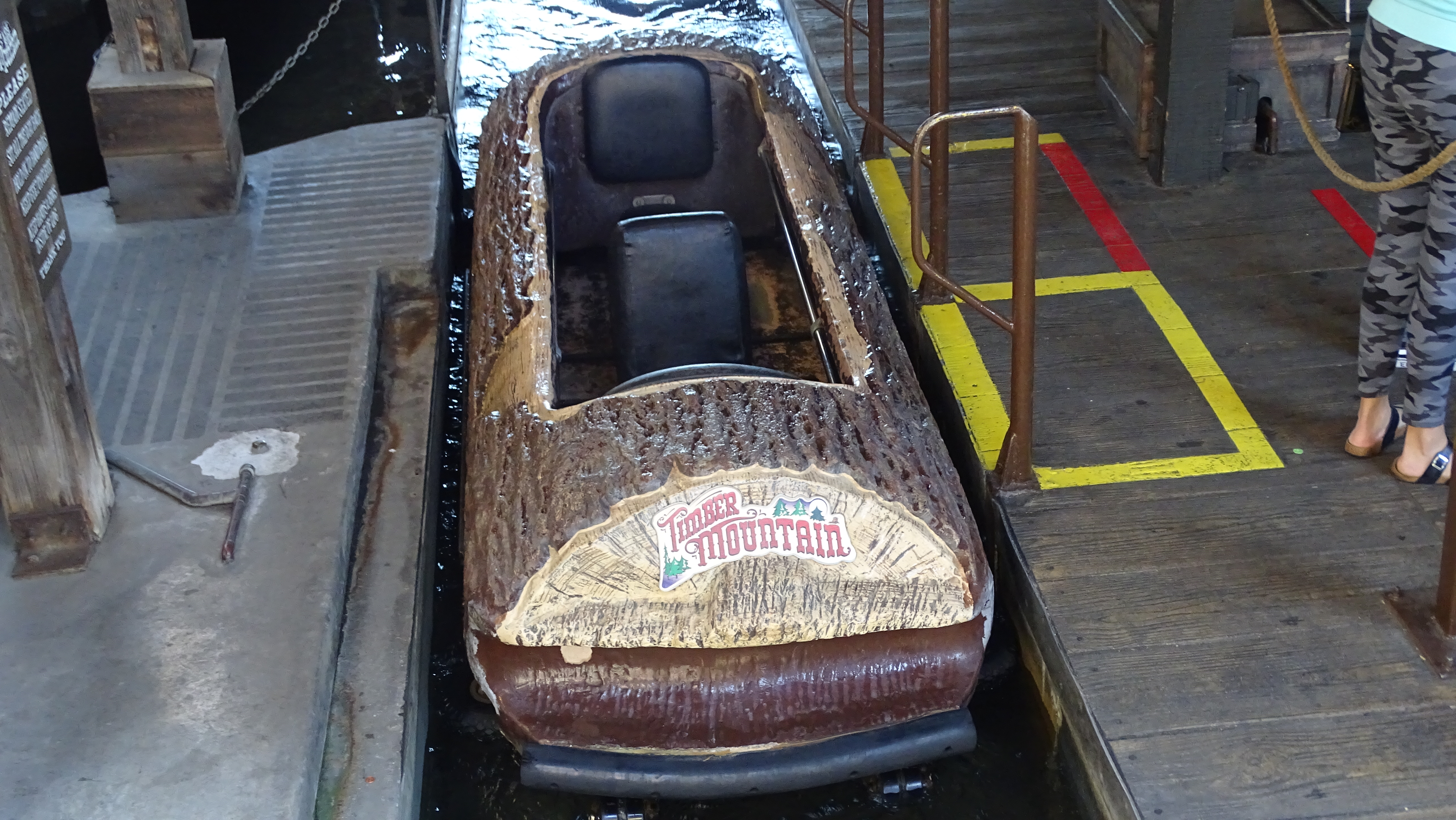
A Timber Mountain Log Ride's log (prior to the 50th anniversary upgrade).

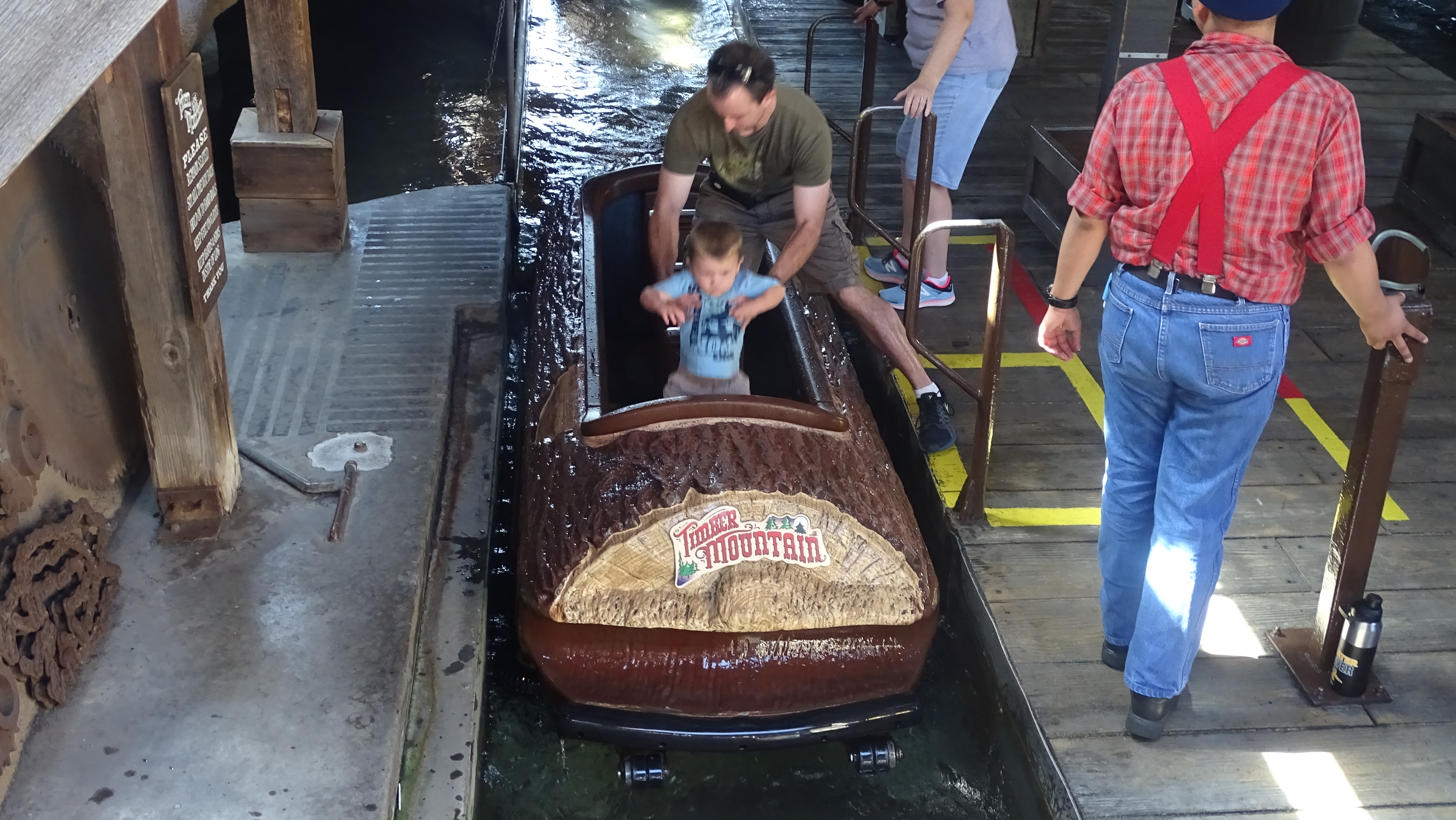
A redesigned log added as part of the 50th anniversary that now features 3 or 4 guests per log.

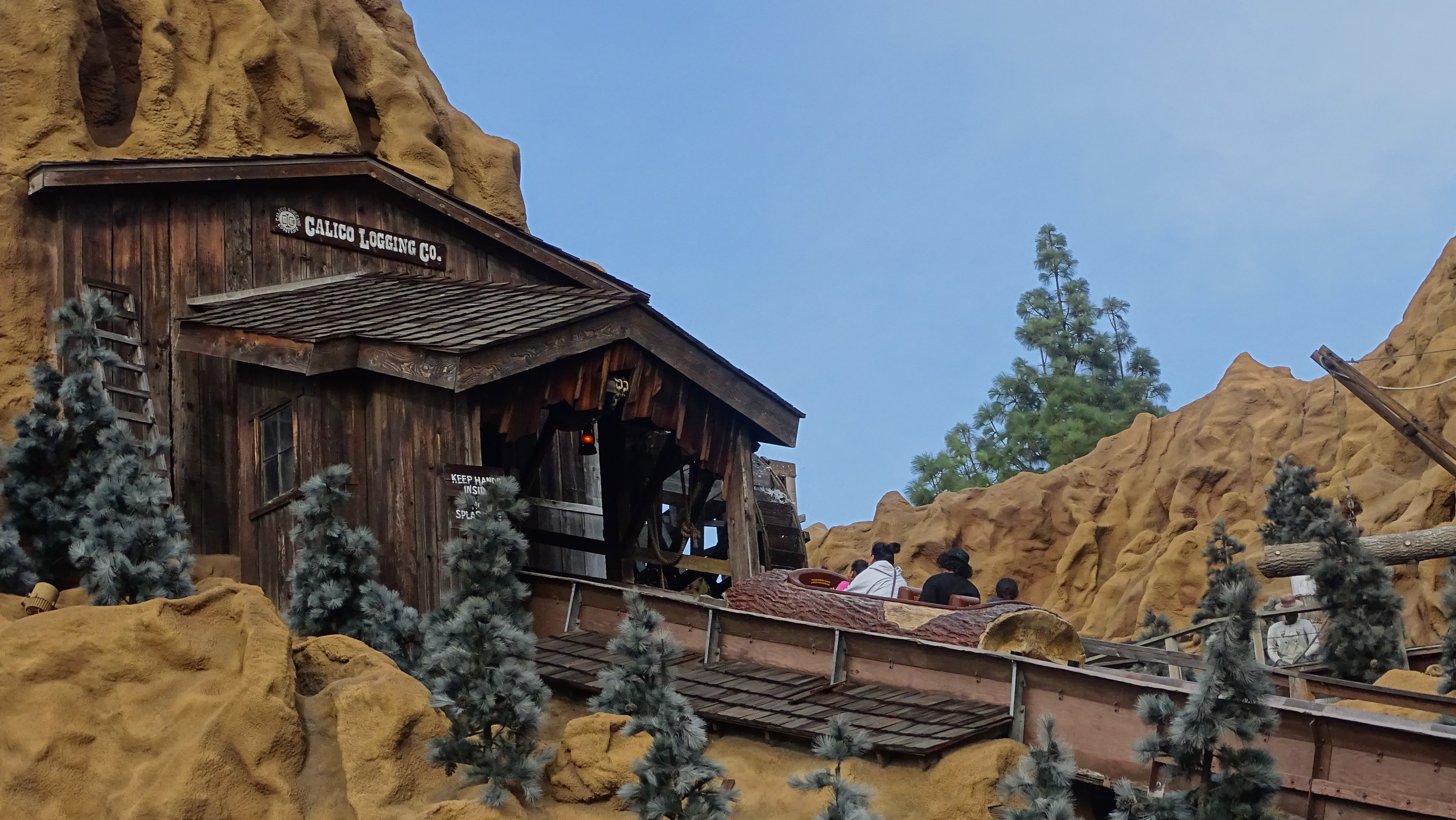
A log heads up the lift hill

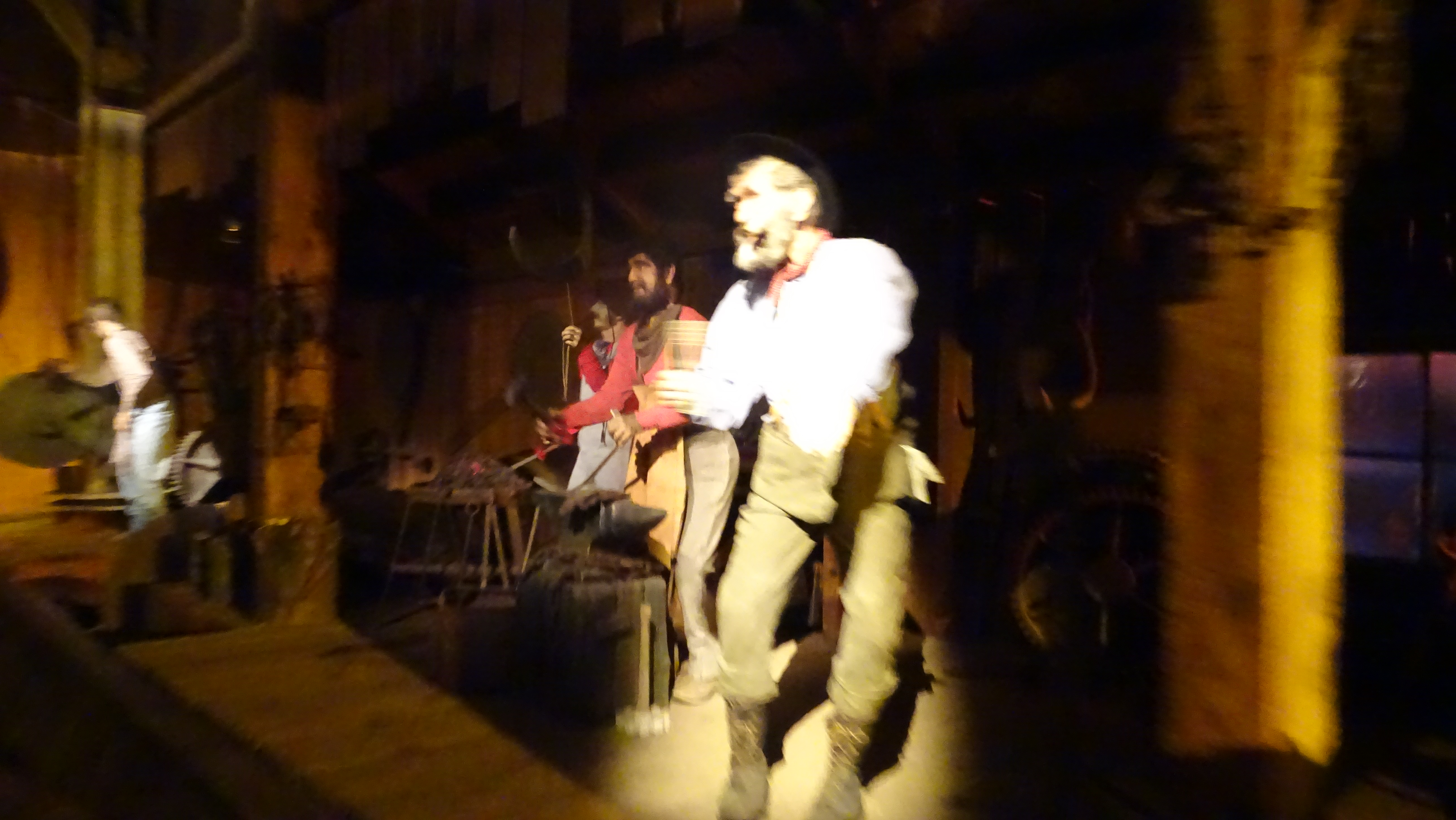
One of the new animatronics added on July 11, 2019, as part of the ride's 50th anniversary

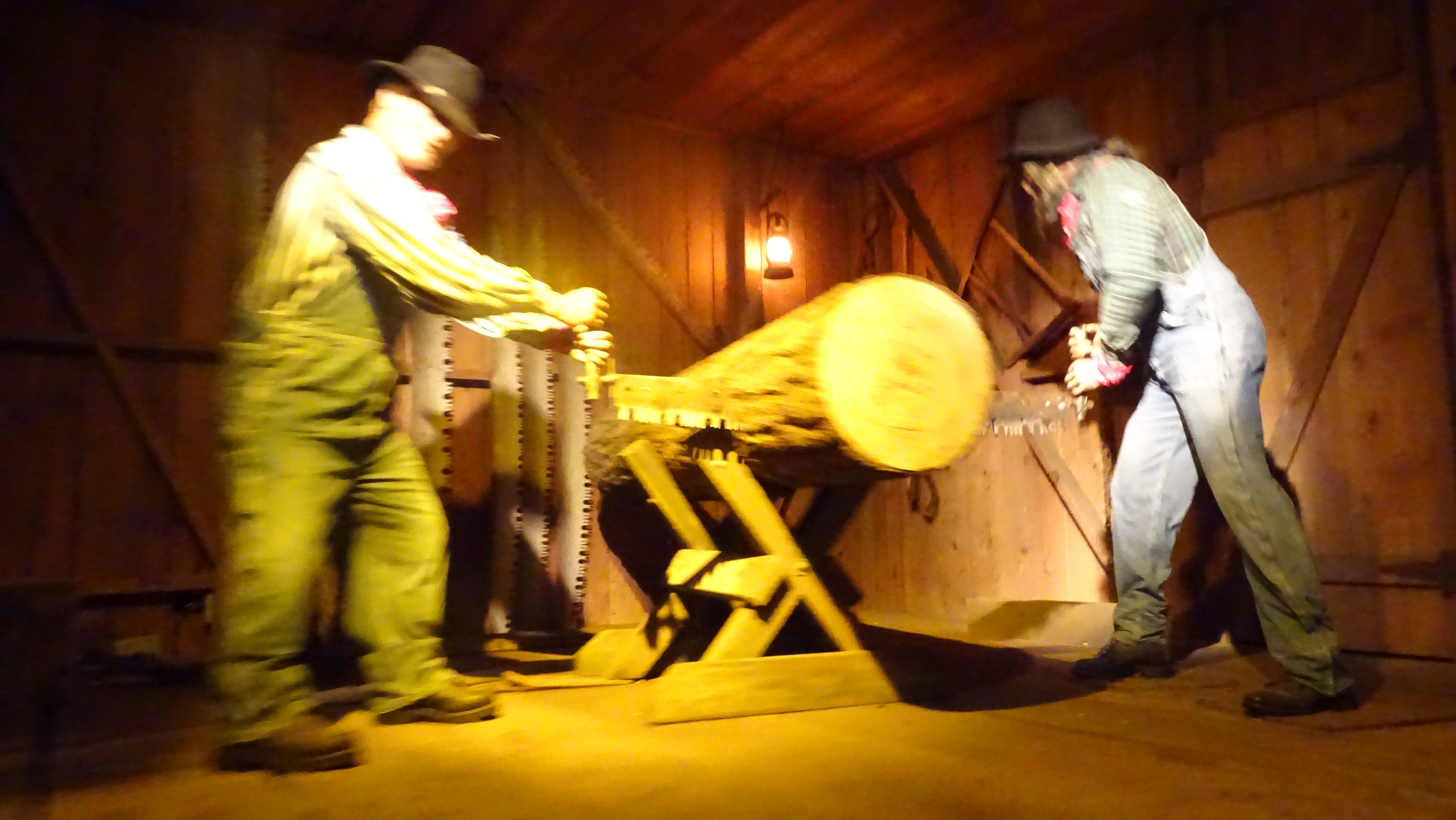
Logger animatronics

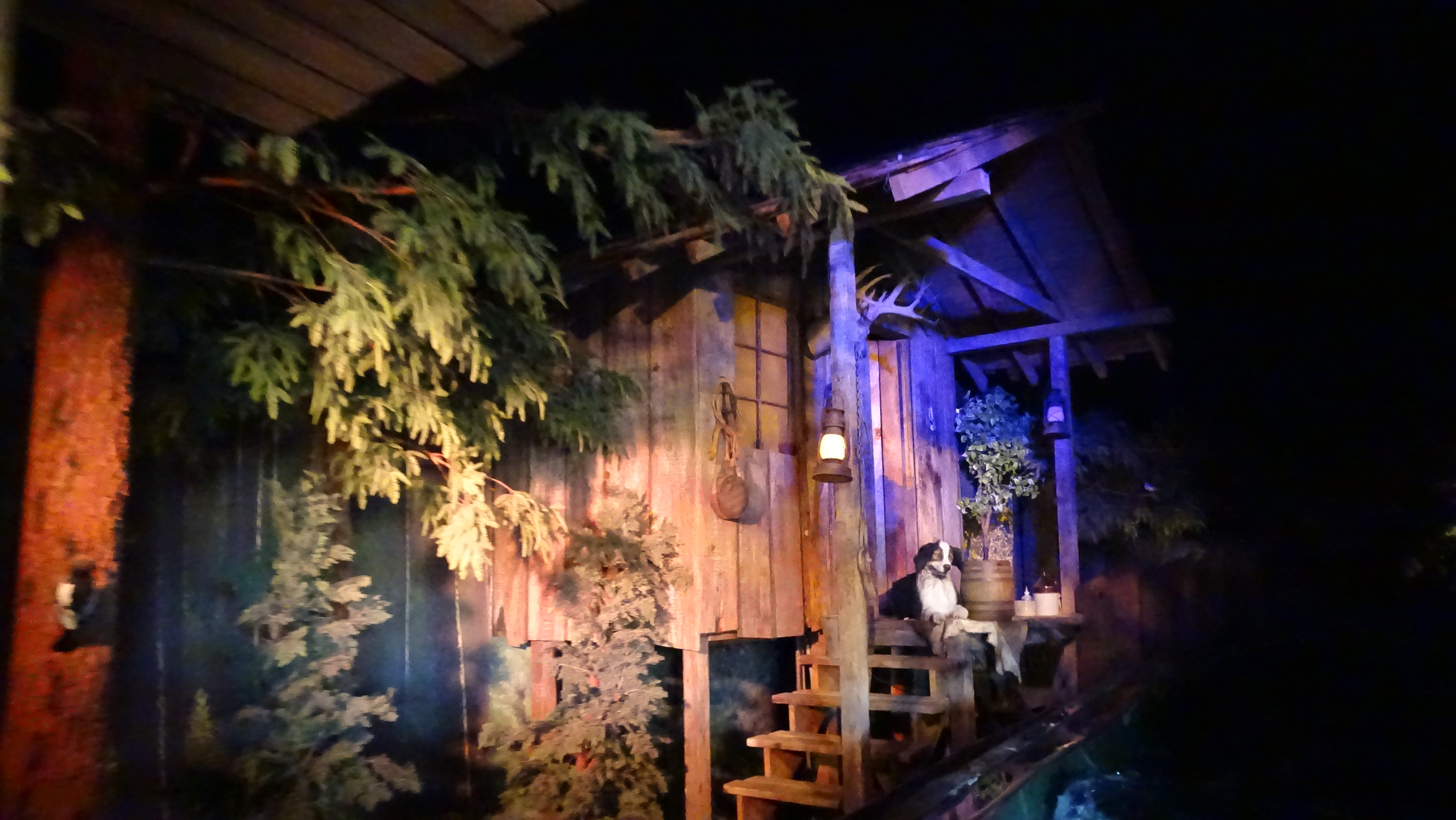
A dog animatronic and a log cabin in the background.

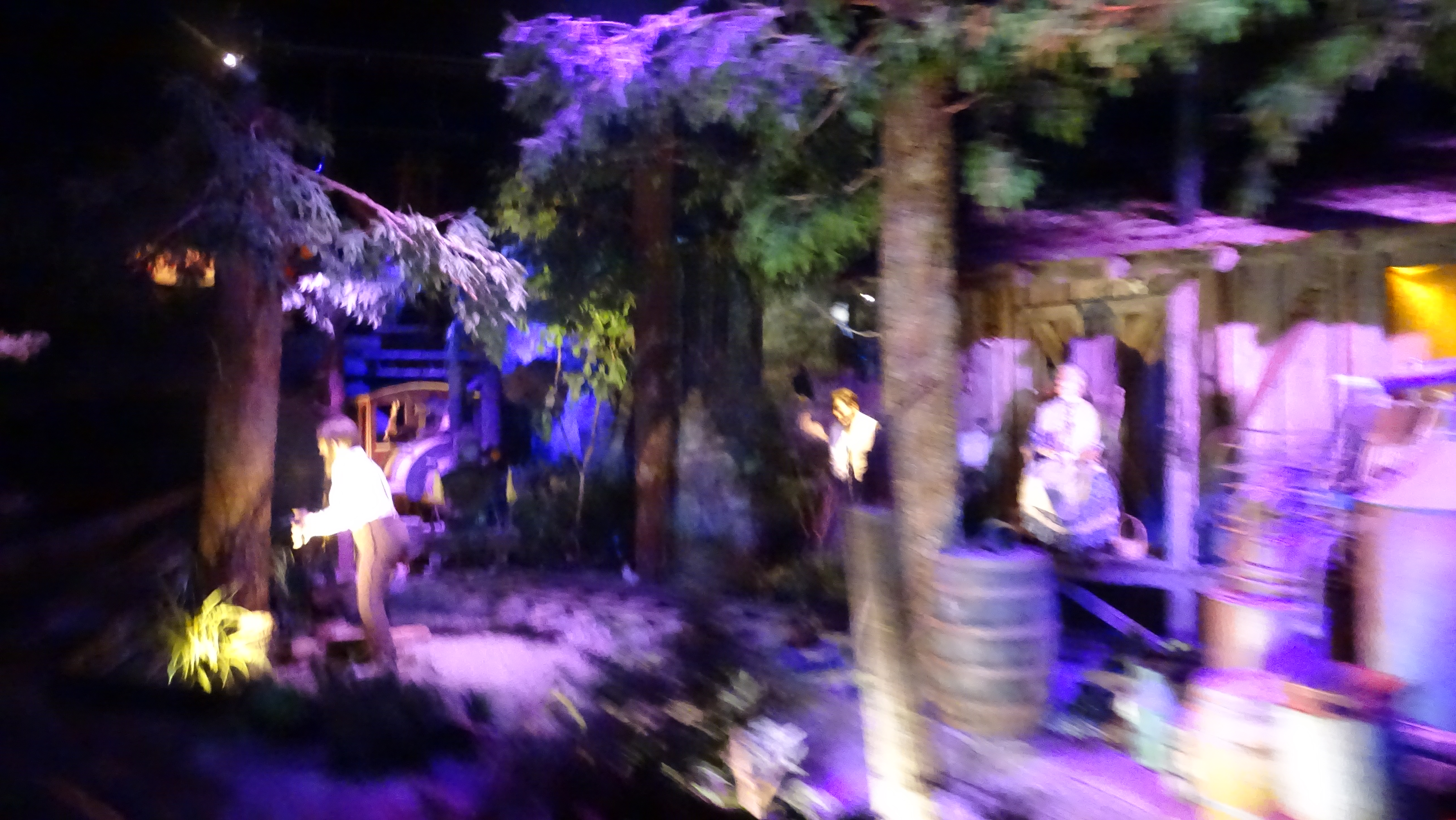
The second indoor dark scene featuring animatronics in a forest setting

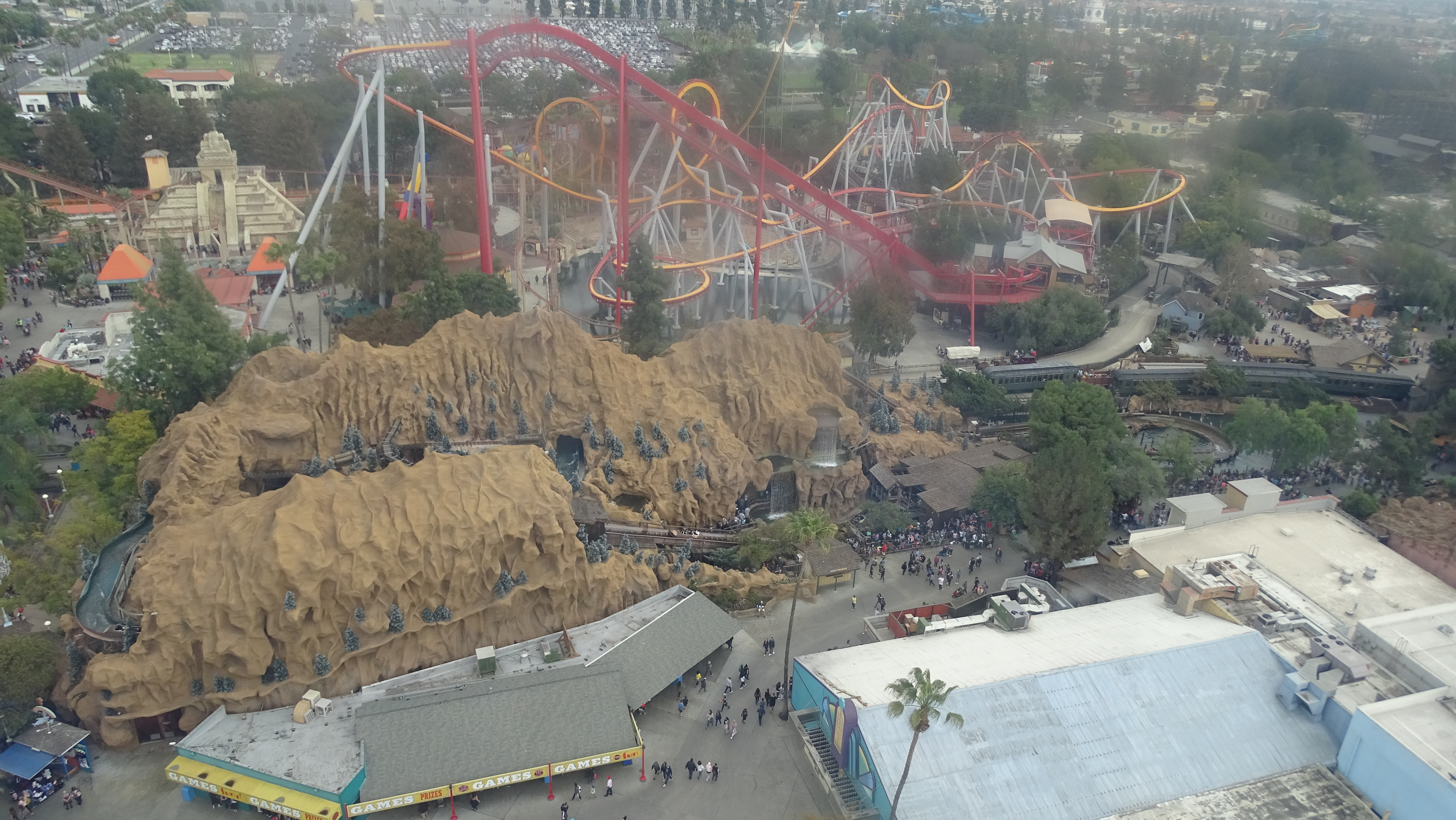
Timber Mountain Log Ride as viewed from the Sky Cabin.
