= Wendell "Bud" Hurlbut =

Theme park creator and entrepreneur

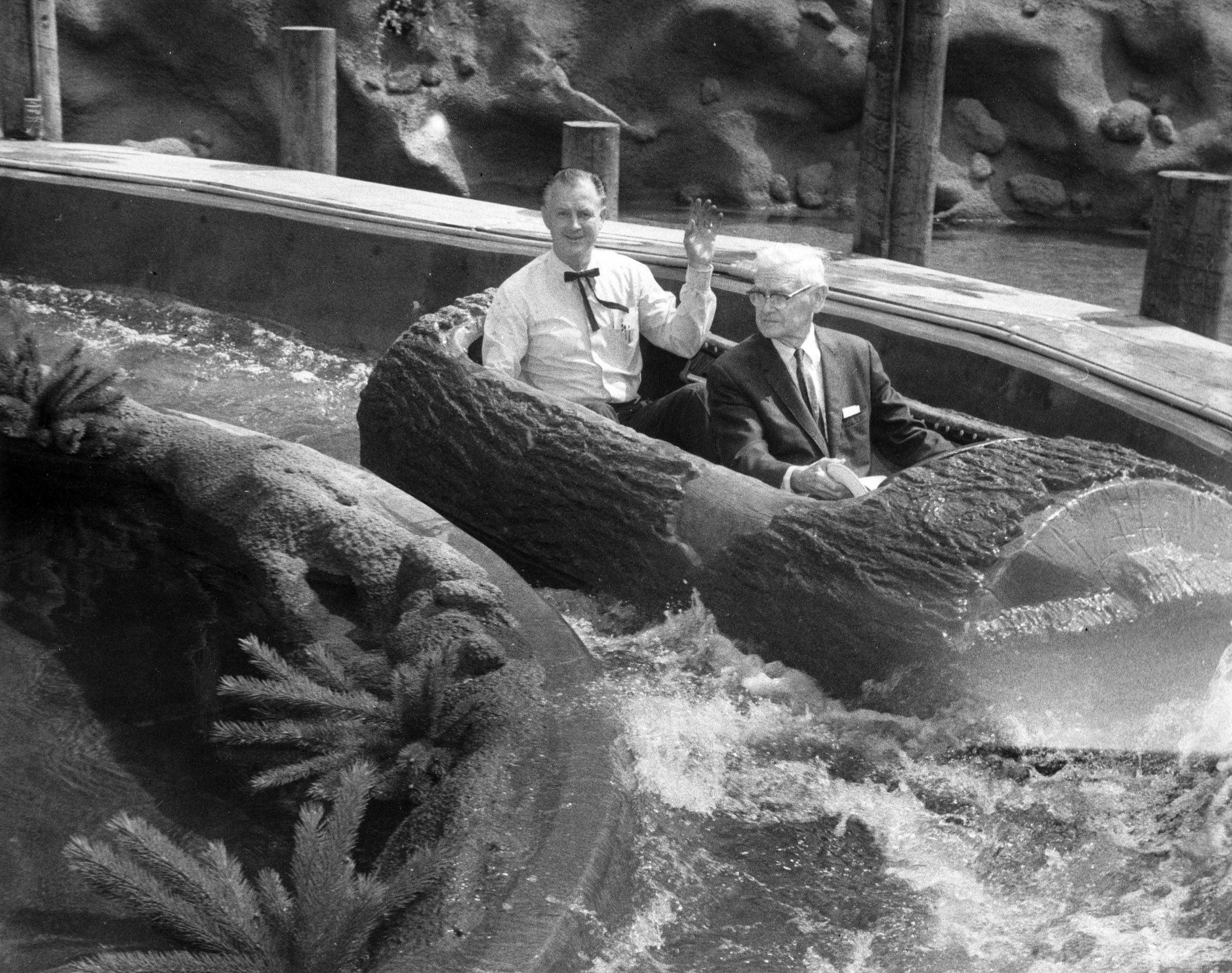
Bud Hurlbut (left) and Walter Knott (right) riding the Timber Mountain Log Ride, Knott's Berry Farm, 1969

Wendell "Bud" Hurlbut (June 13, 1918 – January 5, 2011) was a designer, builder, entrepreneur, and one of the first creators of theme parks in the United States.

== Early life ==
Hurlbut was born on June 13, 1918 in Watertown, South Dakota, the only child of Ray and Emma Hurlbut. The family moved to Whittier, California, where Ray managed a successful oil tool company. Hurlbut graduated from Whittier High School in 1936. Bud worked in a printing company, worked as a pattern maker for Vultee Aircraft, and was a mechanical engineer for F.A. Nemec Combustion Engineers in Whittier, before getting into the amusement park business.

== Theme park creator ==
=== Miniature trains ===
Hurlbut's amusement park experience began with designing and building small-scale trains for people to ride. He sold 12 of them to other operators, then installed one in his own kiddie park in El Monte, California in the parking lot of Crawford's Market. One of Hurlbut's trainsets operated at The Pike in Long Beach. He also designed the replica 1880s train that ran for many years in Santa's Village in the San Bernardino Mountains, and now is at the Santa Ana Zoo. He built the first train for the Nut Tree restaurant complex in Vacaville that would ferry incoming flyers from the Nut Tree Airport to the toy shop and restaurant plaza. Another of Hurbut's trains, built in 1938, is in operation at Adventure City, which is part of the Hobby City complex in Anaheim. Others are at Canaan Land Christian Retreat in Lake Toxaway, North Carolina, Maricopa Live Steamers in Phoenix, Arizona, Castle Park in Riverside, California (see below), and numerous private individuals' backyard railroads across the United States.

His experience and collaboration with Walter Knott would make a name for Hurlbut Amusement Co. and transform Knott's Berry Farm from a chicken dinner restaurant and "ghost town" into a major theme park. Hurlbut began as a concessionaire at Knott's, operating an 1896 Dentzell Menagerie carousel. In 1958, he added the Antique Auto Ride, designed and built by Arrow Development (later renamed Tijuana Taxi), and in 1959, he began to operate one of his small trains around Knott's Lagoon.

=== Calico Mine Train ===
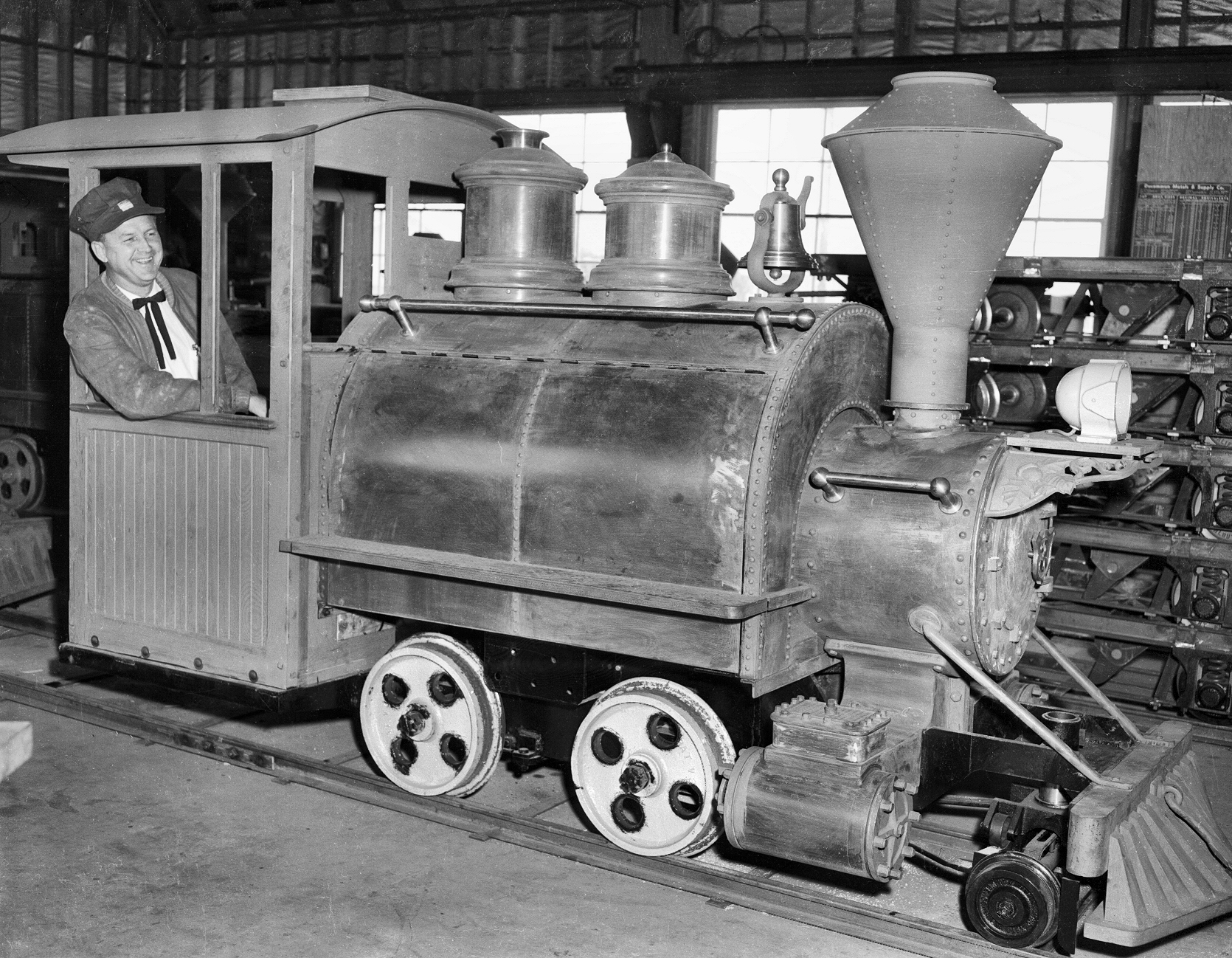
Bud Hurlbut in Calico Mine Ride engine. Photo courtesy of the Orange County Archives.

The major innovation occurred with the Calico Mine Train ride in 1960. This ride was the first authentic "dark" amusement ride, and it has been emulated by amusement parks ever since. Guests boarded an old-time mine train that took them into a "mine" inside a "mountain." Walt Disney frequently came to watch construction on the ride.

Hurlbut sold his ranch, his home, and his new Cadillac to raise money to build the experiment. Part way through construction though, he had to go to Walter Knott and explain that his funds were running out. Knott asked him, "Well, you know what you're doing, right?" Hurlbut described his reply to Knott this way: "I told him 'Yeah, sure.' I never lied to him again."

Knott allowed Hurlbut to suspend his rent payments, and Knott also agreed to pay for a promotional film for the new ride. Hurlbut was able to complete construction and the ride became an instant success.

In 1966, Knott built a full-scale replica of Independence Hall at the park. As a gift, Hurlbut created an exact replica of the Liberty Bell and gave it to Knott, which is still on display in the hall.

Bud Hurlbut's train business was bought and is under production at Western Train Co. since 2011. The Amusement Rides Manufacturer keeps up with the service of Bud's original trains and offers replica train rides now known as "Hurlbut Miniatures".

=== Timber Mountain Log Ride ===
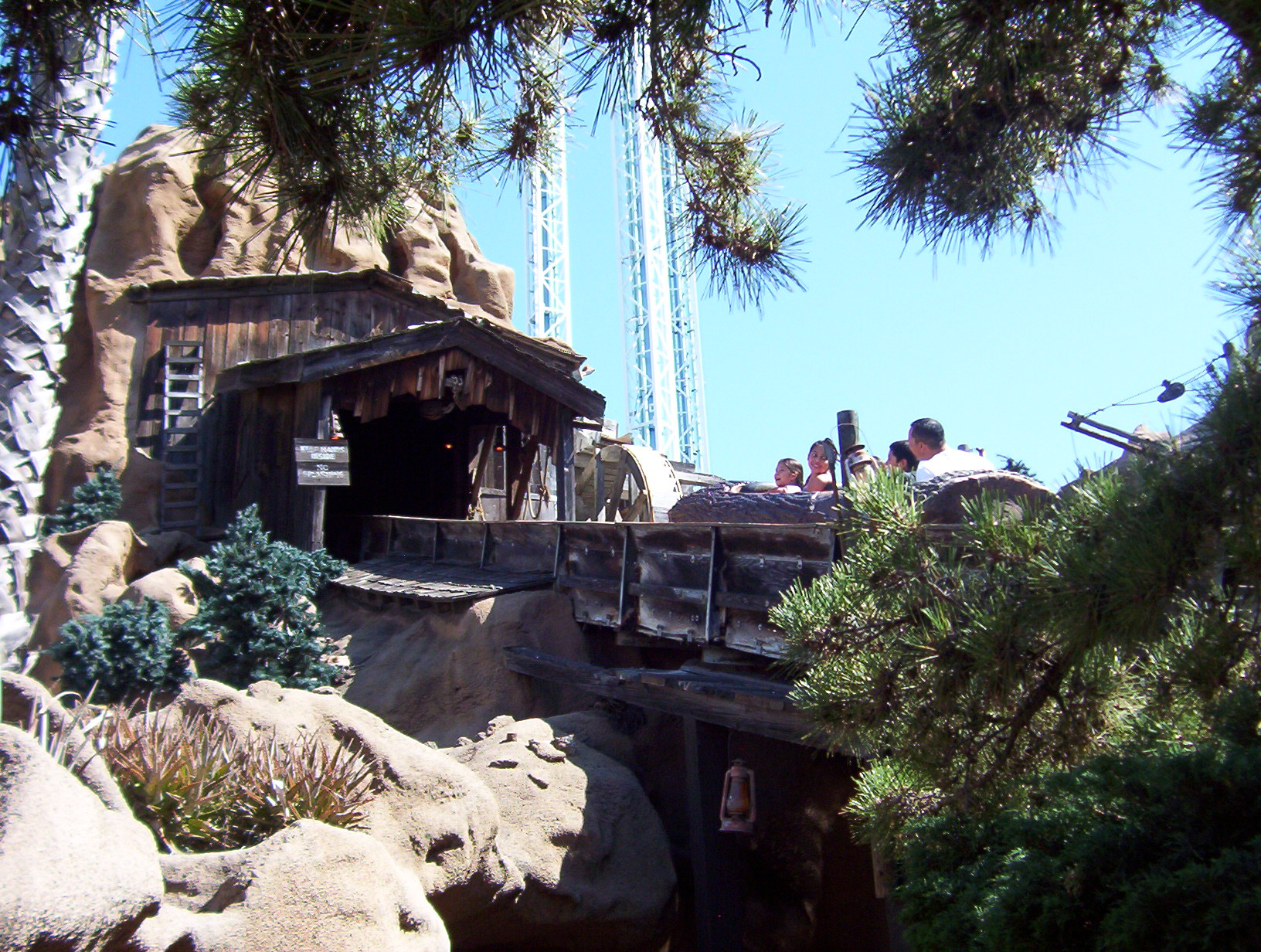
Timber Mountain Log Ride at Knott's.

In 1968, Hurlbut broke ground on building the Timber Mountain Log Ride, another collaboration with Arrow Development, which, along with the Mine Ride, is still considered one of the iconic rides of the park, and one of the most popular. Many guests ride it twice or more when they visit - on some days the turnstile ridership of the Log Ride exceeds that of the front gate of the park. The ride demonstrates great attention to detail, which is the key characteristic of Hurlbut's creations. Many of the items seen on the ride are actual cast-iron gears, steam donkey engines, and sawmill equipment from over a hundred years ago.

=== Knott's Scary Farm ===
He was also one of the creators of Knott's Scary Farm, an annual event at Knott's. Hurlbut was one of the original Haunt Monsters, wearing an ape costume. He hid inside the Calico Mine Train ride, and popped out to scare guests. There are now more than 1,000 "monsters" at Halloween Haunt, and the event has grown to be the most successful special event of any amusement park in the US.

Marty Keithly, former general manager of Knott's Berry Farm, said, "There would not be a Knott's Berry Farm theme park today if it were not for the talent, determination and creativity of Bud Hurlbut."

== Castle Park ==
With parts of rides from which he took from Knott's, Hurlbut designed and operated his own amusement park, Castle Amusement Park, opened in 1976, now named Castle Park, in Riverside, California. Some elements from Knott's, such as the Calico Train and theming, were used in creating the rides, with using some leftover train carts to create the Castle Park Riverside Co. Train.

== Death ==
Hurlbut died of natural causes in Buena Park, California on January 5, 2011 at the age of 92.
