= List of former Knott's Berry Farm attractions =

The following is a list of former attractions at Knott's Berry Farm.

== Former attractions ==
Attraction	Year Opened	Year Closed	Manufacturer	Description
Boomerang	1990	2017	Vekoma	A reverse shuttle roller coaster with a height of 125 feet. It inverted riders six times (3 forwards, 3 backwards). Boomerang replaced the "Roaring '20s" Corkscrew roller coaster (currently located at Silverwood Theme Park). The coaster closed on April 23, 2017 to make room for HangTime and relocated to Trans Studio Cibubur in Indionesia, where it operates as Boomerang Hyper Coaster.
Cable Cars	1955	1979	various	The authentic California Street Cable Railroad San Francisco Cable Cars, converted to battery-electric power, operated as transportation tram servicing the East parking lots – North and South. They were sold back to San Francisco Muni in 1979 for the proposed California St. & Hyde St. expansion of the national monument and clearing the lot for Camp Snoopy.
Camp Bus	1992	2023	Zamperla	A junior flying carpet. Closed in 2023 as part of a huge makeover of Camp Snoopy, and to make room for new attractions.
Corkscrew	1975	1989	Arrow Dynamics	A steel roller coaster featuring two corkscrew inversions. This was the first modern roller coaster to feature an inversion. It was sold to Silverwood Theme Park in 1989 to make room for Boomerang.
Fiesta Wheel	1969	1986	Chance Industries	A Chance Trabant ride where riders boarded a circular ride platform which undulated and rotated simultaneously which spun and tilted riders at the same time as the ride changed direction rapidly.
Gasoline Alley	1969	1996	Arrow Dynamics	An electric Powered automobile ride that was under the Motorcycle Chase/Wacky Soap Box Racers. Both rides were removed in 1996 to make room for Windjammer Surf Racers, and later, Xcelerator.
Gran Slammer	1987	2003	Chance Industries	A Chance Falling Star pendulum where riders boarded a large stadium-like platform, which then orbited a central axis for the duration of the ride cycle. This ride was removed in 2003 to make room for La Revolucion's queue line.
Hammerhead	1996	2003	Zamperla	This Zamperla Rotoshake had riders on a platform three rows flipped upside down while the main arm lifted them high into the sky and around again. At the end the platform inverted, and the fountains below squirted up to nearly douse riders. It was removed in 2003 due to costly mechanical problems and replaced with Rip Tide. This ride made a brief appearance in Voyage to the Iron Reef.
Haunted Shack	1954	2000	Walter Knott	A walk-through attraction demonstrating curious aberrations of gravity. It was replaced by VertiGo, then Screamin' Swing. The site is now occupied by the Calico Mine Stage. A similar attraction at Calico, California named the Mystery Shack still operates.
Henry's Auto Livery	1957	1980s	Walter Beckman	This ride was located out of the main park near the corner of Beach Blvd. and Crescent. The gasoline powered Model-Ts had no center guiderail, instead, the roadway was edged with bumper-rail fencing.
High Sierra Ferris Wheel	1983	2024	Eli Bridge	An 1890s fashioned replica Ferris wheel that offers views of the park from Camp Snoopy.
Huff and Puff	1983	2024	Bradley and Kaye	A miniature minecart ride in Camp Snoopy where younger guests race each other in their vehicle at their own speed through the Sierra Mountains.
Jungle Island	1964	1982	Mr. Forrest Morrow	Jungle Island was not part of the gated admission park but across Beach Blvd north of Independence Hall. It was a jungle-like area surrounded by a lagoon and created the illusion of an island. There was a small fee to cross the bridge to get inside. Once inside it was a jungle paradise with wooden animals, live ducks and birds roaming free, many trees and trails for kids to run around and play. Jungle Island lagoon still exists today but the playground island has been replaced with buildings.
Knott's Bear-y Tales/Kingdom of the Dinosaurs	1975	2004	Fantasy Fair	This dark ride first took riders past a fairy-tale like plot set in the Roaring '20s with a Bear family named, Raz, Boysen, Girlsen, Elder, and Flapper Bear-y on a journey to the fair while being in contact with a pie thief named Crafty Coyote and other animals from the Fantasy scenes. It later was revamped with a dinosaur theme in 1987 (while Bear-y Tales moved to the Peanuts Playhouse after Kingdom of the Dinosaurs opened to be renamed Bear-y Tales Funhouse until 1997) that took riders back in time to the pre-historic times which would be permanently closed on December 23, 2004 due to aging parts and lack of popularity. The ride building suffered vandalism from park employees sometime after closing, with several set pieces and animatronics damaged. Some of the animatronics, set pieces, and props went on to be reused throughout the park, including the Timber Mountain Log Ride as well as several Halloween Haunt mazes and scare zones. The ride building was finally gutted of all ride equipment (including ride vehicles and track), set pieces, props and animatronics in July 2014 to make way for the new interactive 4-D dark ride Voyage to the Iron Reef, which opened in Spring 2015 and closed in January 2020.
Knott's Lagoon	?	1983	various	An artificial lake that featured, row boats, paddle boats and the Cordelia K steamboat. When Camp Snoopy expansion replaced the North parking lot, Knott's Lagoon was bulldozed and paved over for the new main parking lot. The connecting underpass now leads to the main parking.
Knott's Pacific Pavilion	1986	1998	N/A	An outdoor venue that formerly housed dolphin and sea lion shows. It also presented diving shows. The pavilion closed in 1998 and was replaced by Perilous Plunge. The site is now home to the Pacific Scrambler.
Log Peeler	1984	2014	Eli Bridge Company	A kiddie scrambler located in the Camp Snoopy section of the park that was removed to add Pig Pen's Mud Buggies.
Loop Trainer Flying Machine	1976	1989	Anton Schwarzkopf	A standard Enterprise (ride) where riders spun in a 360-degree orbit. In 1989, this ride was removed to make room for the XK-1 in 1990.
Merry-Go-Round Auto Ride/Tijuana Taxi	1969	1976	Arrow Dynamics equipment, Bud Hurlbut design.	Miniature Model T automobiles followed an electric center-rail track through storage tunnel, up hills, around surprising features and over bridges. The shotcrete landscape created by Bud Hurlbut was demolished in 1976 to accommodate the expansion of Fiesta Village.
Mexican Whip	1969	1986	Sellner Manufacturing	A classic Tilt-A-Whirl, riders experienced intermittent bursts of sudden directional changes. Removed in 1986 along with Fiesta Wheel to make room for the Tampico Tumbler.
Motorcycle Chase/Wacky Soap Box Racers	1976	1996	Arrow Dynamics	A quadruplet steeplechase steel roller coaster that featured gentle dips and had four tracks parallel to each other. A favorite of many park goers, it was taken out in 1996 to make room for the Windjammer Surf Racers, and later, Xcelerator.
Mott's Miniatures	1956	1992	Allegra & DeWitt Mott	A museum collection of miniature homes and furnishings, featuring the world's smallest working television set. In 1996, the attraction moved to La Palma Avenue at the exit of Knott's parking as museum and doll house furnishing store. The museum closed in 1997 and was auctioned off. The Mott's Miniature mail-order business is thriving.
Perilous Plunge	2000	2012	Intamin	A shoot-the-chutes water ride featuring a steep 15-story drop. A rider fell on the descent and died on the ride in 2001. The ride closed for the Boardwalk section of the park, which opened in 2013.
Propeller Spin	1976	1989	Frank Hrubetz and Co.	Riders spun in a 360-degree orbit. This was a Hrubetz Super Round Up ride.
RipTide	2004	2016	HUSS	Riders flipped upside-down repeatedly in a 360-degree orbit, while suspended over a water reservoir.
Rocky Mountain Trucking Company	1983	2024	Zamperla	A popular track ride in the Camp Snoopy area where children could "drive" miniature 18-wheeler semi-trucks. Closed in 2024 as part of huge makeover of Camp Snoopy. Now rethemed and updated as Camp Snoopy's Off-Road Rally.
Screamin' Swing	2004	2015	S&S Worldwide	An A-frame structure supporting two pendulum arms. Each pendulum is attached to four seats (two facing each direction), and swings back and forth. This was the first installation of the Screamin' Swing type ride from S&S Worldwide and operated as an upcharge attraction. It was closed in 2015 and removed to make room for a new live entertainment venue, the Calico Mine Stage.
Sky Jump	1976	1999	Intamin	Riders simulated a parachute free-fall to terra-firma from over 15 stories in the air.
Tampico Tumbler	1987	2003	Zierer	A Zierer Hexentanz or Fireball ride where riders orbited and spun in two different directions simultaneously. Two cars are mounted on each arm (eight arms total.) The entire ride lifts so that each arm can rotate both cars over each other at a rapid pace.
Timberline Twister	1983	2023	Bradley & Kaye	A junior roller coaster. Closed in 2023 as part of huge makeover of Camp Snoopy, and to make room for new attractions.
VertiGo	2001	2002	S&S Worldwide	Riders would be rocketed up and dropped from 300 feet in the air. The ride was removed from the park in March 2002 after an incident occurred at Knott's sister park Cedar Point. The site was later replaced by Screamin' Swing.
Voyage to the Iron Reef	2015	2020	Triotech	A 4D interactive dark ride that opened to the public on May 15, 2015. Voyage to the Iron Reef used approximately 600 feet (180 m) of track. There are six scenes using a combined total of eleven screens varying from 20 feet (6.1 m) to 70 feet (21 m) in length. As the ride transitions between scenes, physical props are used; unlike its sister attraction, Wonder Mountain's Guardian at Canada's Wonderland. While the ride was initially popular with park visitors, it later became disliked by most fans due to the background story and overall ride experience. The ride later suffered from lack of maintenance care and repairs leading to a drop in visitor satisfaction. The ride closed on January 5, 2020 to make way for Knott's Bear-y Tales: Return to the Fair, which uses the same ride system and layout as Voyage to the Iron Reef.
Walter K. Steamboat	1969	2004	Arrow Dynamics	A simulated steamboat (diesel-powered) which sailed around "Reflection Lake." The lake was made smaller due to the installment of Silver Bullet, then removed completely to make room for Sierra Sidewinder.
Whirlpool/Greased Lightning/HeadAche	1976	1999	Reverchon	This standard Mack Matterhorn Himalaya ride had riders orbited a central point while undulating repeatedly. It opened with the Roaring 20s area, renamed Greased Lighting for Knott's Airfield, renamed HeadAche for The Boardwalk, removed in 1999 – replaced with Perilous Plunge. This ride relocated to Miracle Strip Amusement Park where it opened as The Blue Thunder.
Windjammer Surf Racers	1997	2000	TOGO International	Twin racing steel roller coaster that featured vertical loops, spirals, tight banking turns and multiple dips.
WindSeeker	2011	2013	Mondial	A 301 ft tower swing ride where riders orbit a central tower at heights exceeding 25 stories. The ride was closed after two incidents where riders were stranded for over three hours at the top of the tower. It was relocated to Knott's sister park, Worlds of Fun where it was renamed as SteelHawk. Sol Spin was later placed in the spot where WindSeeker once stood in 2017.
XK-1	1990	1997	Intamin	This rare Intamin Flight Trainer ride had riders pivoted upside-down in enclosed pods while orbiting a central tower. After 1997, it was removed to make room for Supreme Scream.

== See also ==
- Knott's Berry Farm
