= Knott's Bear-y Tales =

Defunct dark ride

Knott's Berry Farm
- Area: Roaring 20s
- Status: Removed
- Cost: $900,000
- Opening date: July 4, 1975
- Closing date: October 31, 1986
- Replaced by: Kingdom of the Dinosaurs

Ride statistics
- Attraction type: dark ride
- Manufacturer: Fantasy Fair
- Designer: Rolly Crump
- Theme: Imagination and Fantasy
- Music: "Welcome One and All"
- Length: 600 ft (180 m)
- Site area: 20,000 sq ft (1,900 m^{2})
- Vehicle type: Omnimover
- Riders per vehicle: 4
- Duration: 8:00

Knott's Bear-y Tales was a dark ride located at Knott's Berry Farm that opened in 1975 as part of the Roaring 20s area. The attraction was designed by Disney Imagineer Rolly Crump as part of creating a ride that would complement Gypsy Camp, a former themed area of the park. However, the dwindling Gypsy Camp would end up becoming a new section called the Roaring 20s (now known as The Boardwalk). As a result, the design of Bear-y Tales was altered twice until it ended up reflecting the theme of the Roaring 20s area. During construction, the building caught on fire and a couple of scenes that were under development were destroyed. However, the attraction was given an extended deadline to allow more time and reconstruction of the damaged parts of the ride. In the fall of 1986, Knott's Bear-y Tales was closed to become Kingdom of the Dinosaurs due to the then-upcoming trend of dinosaurs. Following the closure, many of the animatronics and set pieces were obtained by employees, while others stayed within Knott's to become a part of a walk-through experience in 1987 located at the Camp Snoopy area. That attraction also closed and was removed in 1998.

On November 7, 2019, Knott's announced that a new 4-D interactive attraction serving as a sequel to Knott's Bear-y Tales would replace Voyage to the Iron Reef for the 100th anniversary of the park, titled "Knott's Bear-y Tales: Return to the Fair". The ride opened on May 21, 2021.

== Ride experience ==
Guests are taken to the Boysenberry Factory, where they are first introduced to the villain of this ride: the notorious pie thief, Crafty Coyote. Guests will also encounter and meet Boysen and Girlsen, the heroes, waving to them as they spin on a gear. As they travel through, they will see many sights around them. Upon visiting the Boysenberry Bakery, guests will see some beavers, baking boysenberry pies, and they will see Crafty in the back attempting to steal pies off a cooling rack. From here, Guests visit the Frog Forest, home to frogs big and small. Guests will see all the mushroom-shaped houses and swamps around them. As the ride continues, guests see two frogs on a boat under the moon. One singing a song to serenade the other. From this point, the ride exits Frog Forest and reaches the Gypsy Camp, where guests meet the Gypsies and fortune-tellers. They will see Sarah Skunk, with her movies on her crystal ball. They will also see Wanda Fox, with her spirits and her teapots. They also see Theda Bear, with her floating playing cards, and finally, they meet Zaz Owl, who reads their fortune. When this section of the ride concludes, guests see Crafty Coyote again, taking a nap on a hill, with a bellyful of pie, all while boysenberry pie tins all around him. At this point, guests go to Thunder Cave, which plays Thunder sounds while the guests are riding on a long straight track. Towards the end of this straight path, they see bizarre creatures called Weirdos. This is when the ride passes through their home, Weird Woods. It is also the home of Crafty Coyote, as they will see from noticing a cave titled "Crafty's Hideout". From here, they leave the Weird Woods and reach the goal of the ride: the County Fair. This is the Grand Finale of the ride. Guests see sights all around them. At the beginning of the Fair, guests see Crafty Coyote (in disguise), posing as Dr. Fox, the prominent snake oil salesman. Guests also get to meet another fortune teller, a panda named Madam Wong, who can read fortunes through fortune cookies. They also see sights like the puppet show, dances, and hot air balloons all around them. Towards the end of this event, guests see the Boysen and Girlsen, with their family, winning the blue ribbon for their pies and posing for a photo. Crafty Coyote appears again, but now he is locked up in a box, with a pie just barely out of reach. This is when the ride begins to conclude, but not before the characters like Boysen, Girlsen, the family, and Crafty Coyote all wave goodbye to the guests on the ride. At this point, the ride ends and the guests return to the ride station.
