= Voyage to the Iron Reef =

Defunct 4D interactive dark ride

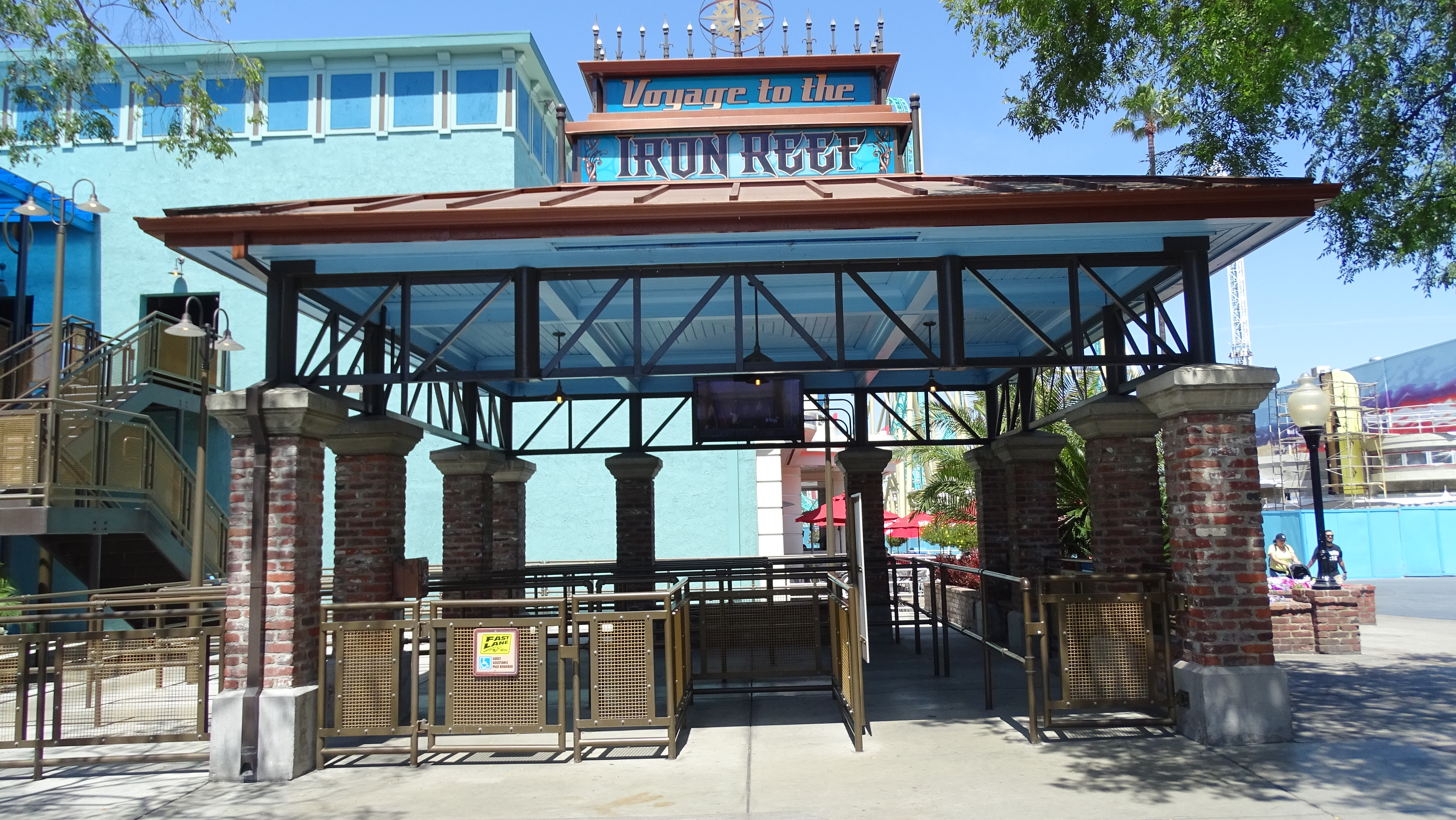

Knott's Berry Farm
- Area: The Boardwalk
- Status: Closed
- Soft opening date: May 13, 2015
- Opening date: May 15, 2015
- Closing date: January 5, 2020
- Replaced: Kingdom of the Dinosaurs
- Replaced by: Knott's Bear-y Tales: Return to the Fair

Ride statistics
- Attraction type: Interactive dark ride
- Manufacturer: Triotech
- Designer: Triotech
- Length: 600 ft (180 m)
- Site area: 18,040 sq ft (1,676 m^{2})
- Capacity: 575 riders per hour
- Vehicle type: Car
- Vehicles: 16
- Riders per vehicle: 4
- Duration: 5:00
- Fast Lane was available

Voyage to the Iron Reef was a 4D interactive dark ride located at Knott's Berry Farm theme park in Buena Park, California. Designed by Triotech, the underwater-themed attraction opened to the public on May 15, 2015. It was the second release in the Amusement Dark collection, a branded initiative to construct a variety of video-game-based dark rides at Cedar Fair amusement parks. Wonder Mountain's Guardian was the first in the collection that opened at Canada's Wonderland in 2014.

== History ==
Cedar Fair CEO Matt Ouimet, a former Disneyland president, began a dark ride initiative shortly after joining the company in 2011. Amusement Dark, the name for the new initiative, was trademarked in 2013. Unlike dark rides at Disney and Universal theme parks that can cost upwards of $100 million, Cedar Fair plans to build dark ride attractions in each of its parks with budgets that are only 10% to 15% of its largest competitors, made possible by avoiding expensive intellectual property rights and repurposing dormant areas within the park. Knott's Berry Farm general manager Raffi Kaprelyan stated, “We can’t compete with Disney and Universal on budget, but we can compete on entertainment value.”

The first park in the Cedar Fair chain to incorporate this type of attraction was Canada's Wonderland, which opened Wonder Mountain's Guardian in 2014. The part roller coaster, part dark ride attraction made use of available space in the park's Wonder Mountain area. Following its success, Cedar Fair announced plans on November 13, 2014, to build its next dark ride attraction in the series, Voyage to the Iron Reef, at Knott's Berry Farm in 2015. The building selected for the new attraction formerly housed Knott’s Bear-y Tales and Kingdom of the Dinosaurs, the latter of which closed in 2004. Montreal-based Triotech, a relative newcomer to the dark ride industry, built and designed the ride. It features eleven screens – ten of which are interactive – and 44 high-definition projectors. Triotech CEO Ernest Yale revealed that over 100 computers operate the ride. He described the process of seamlessly linking everything together as "really complex" in order to process millions of calculations per minute.

Voyage to the Iron Reef soft-opened to the media and a limited audience on May 13, 2015. It opened to the public two days later on May 15. The total cost to the park was estimated at $10 million, though the official amount was not disclosed. On November 7, 2019, it was announced that a revival of Knott's Bear-y Tales would replace Voyage to the Iron Reef for the park's 100th Anniversary, with Iron Reef closing on January 5, 2020.

== Characteristics ==
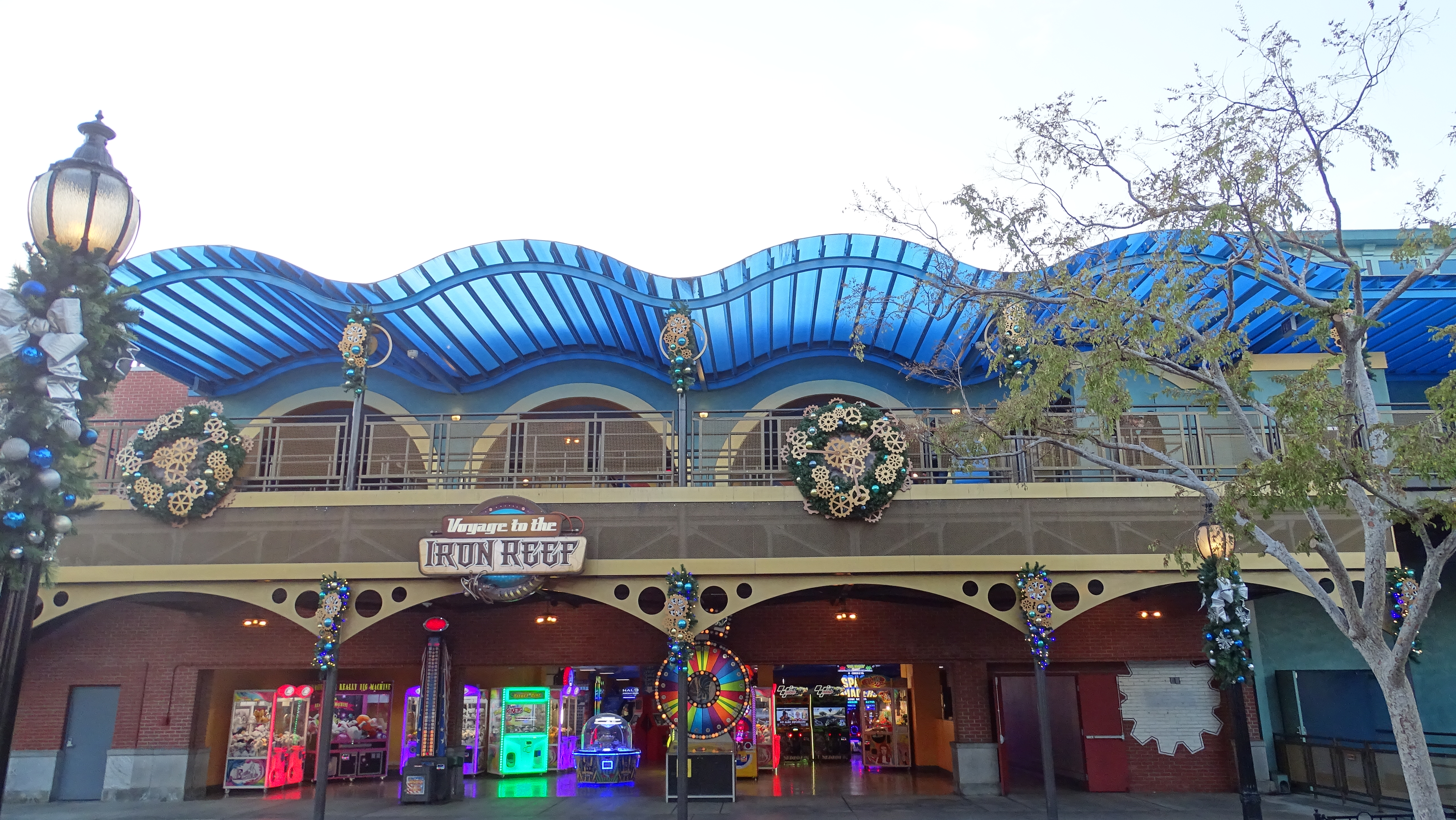
Side view of the attraction outdoors

Voyage to the Iron Reef used approximately 600 feet (180 m) of track. There are six scenes using a combined total of eleven screens varying from 20 feet (6.1 m) to 70 feet (21 m) in length. As the ride transitions between scenes, physical props are used; unlike Wonder Mountain's Guardian.

== Plot ==
An old sailor was out at sea, when all of a sudden, he saw a mechanized crab on his boat. It ripped apart the boat piece by piece. He tried unsuccessfully to stop it. At this point metal tentacles appeared from the ocean. Seeing the threat before him, the old sailor jumped into the sea and the robotic tentacles ripped the boat into pieces. The now washed up sailor, found himself on a sandy beach. He looked around, only to find an island with Knott´s Berry Farm on it. This is where the sailor enlists his armada of riders to stop these mechanized sea creatures and their leader, the Kraken Queen. Riders must save the park to stop her and her army from taking over the park.

== Ride experience ==
Voyage to the Iron Reef featured a 3-D animated story that enlists guests to battle against underwater creatures that are attempting to harvest steel from the park's iconic attractions and destroy them in the process. Guests waiting in line move through a googie-themed queue area and board the ride from an open-air loading platform. The dark ride contains eight pairs of two submarine-themed vehicles that move along a steel track and stop momentarily at various points throughout the course.

Riders were armed with light-sensitive laser guns that symbolically shoot freeze rays at enemies onscreen, which crystallize and break apart after being hit a successful number of times. An LED display in front of every rider displays the score. Iconic symbols from the park's history are animated onscreen, such as the Roaring '20s neon sign that once stood atop the Iron Reef's building, and can be spotted throughout the ride and interacted with. The story reaches a climax at a final showdown with the Kraken Queen as she launches a variety of attacks during a chase scene. Before disembarking, riders are shown how their scores ranked against other riders and include on-ride photos which are posted next to each score.
