= Knott's Bear-y Tales: Return to the Fair =

4D interactive dark ride

Knott's Bear-y Tales: Return To The Fair

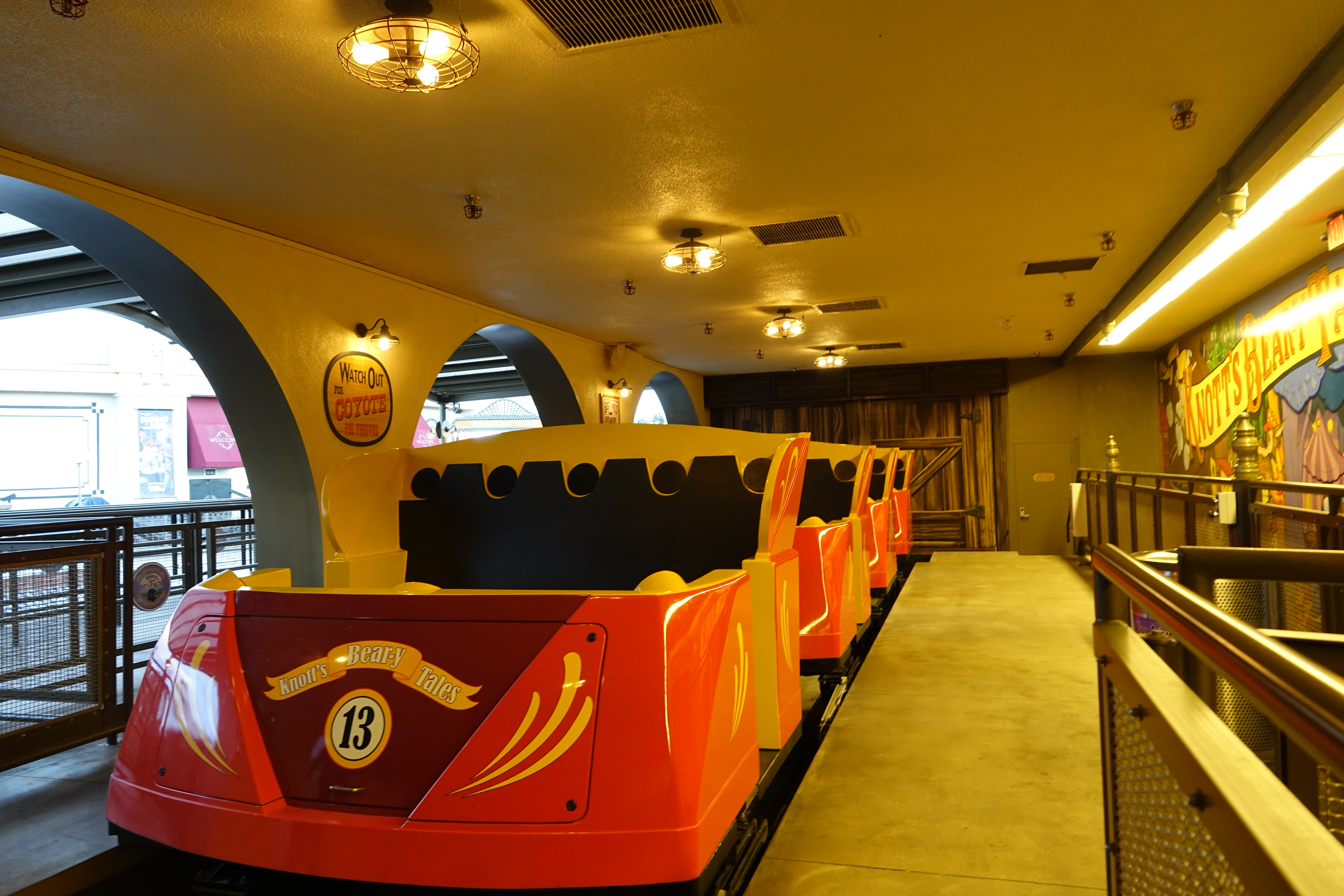
- Knott's Bear-y Tales Return to the Fair ride vehicles & loading station

Knott's Berry Farm
- Area: The Boardwalk
- Status: Operating
- Soft opening date: May 6, 2021
- Opening date: May 21, 2021
- Replaced: Voyage to the Iron Reef

Ride statistics
- Attraction type: Interactive dark ride
- Manufacturer: Triotech
- Designer: Triotech; Rolly Crump; Chris Crump
- Theme: Knott's Bear-y Tales (Fantasy)
- Music: "Welcome One and All" (Re imagined by Knott's Berry Farm)
- Length: 600 ft (180 m)
- Site area: 18,040 sq ft (1,676 m^{2})
- Capacity: 700 riders per hour
- Vehicle type: Car
- Vehicles: 16
- Riders per vehicle: 8
- Rows: 1
- Riders per row: 4
- Duration: 5:00
- Website: Official website
- Fast Lane available

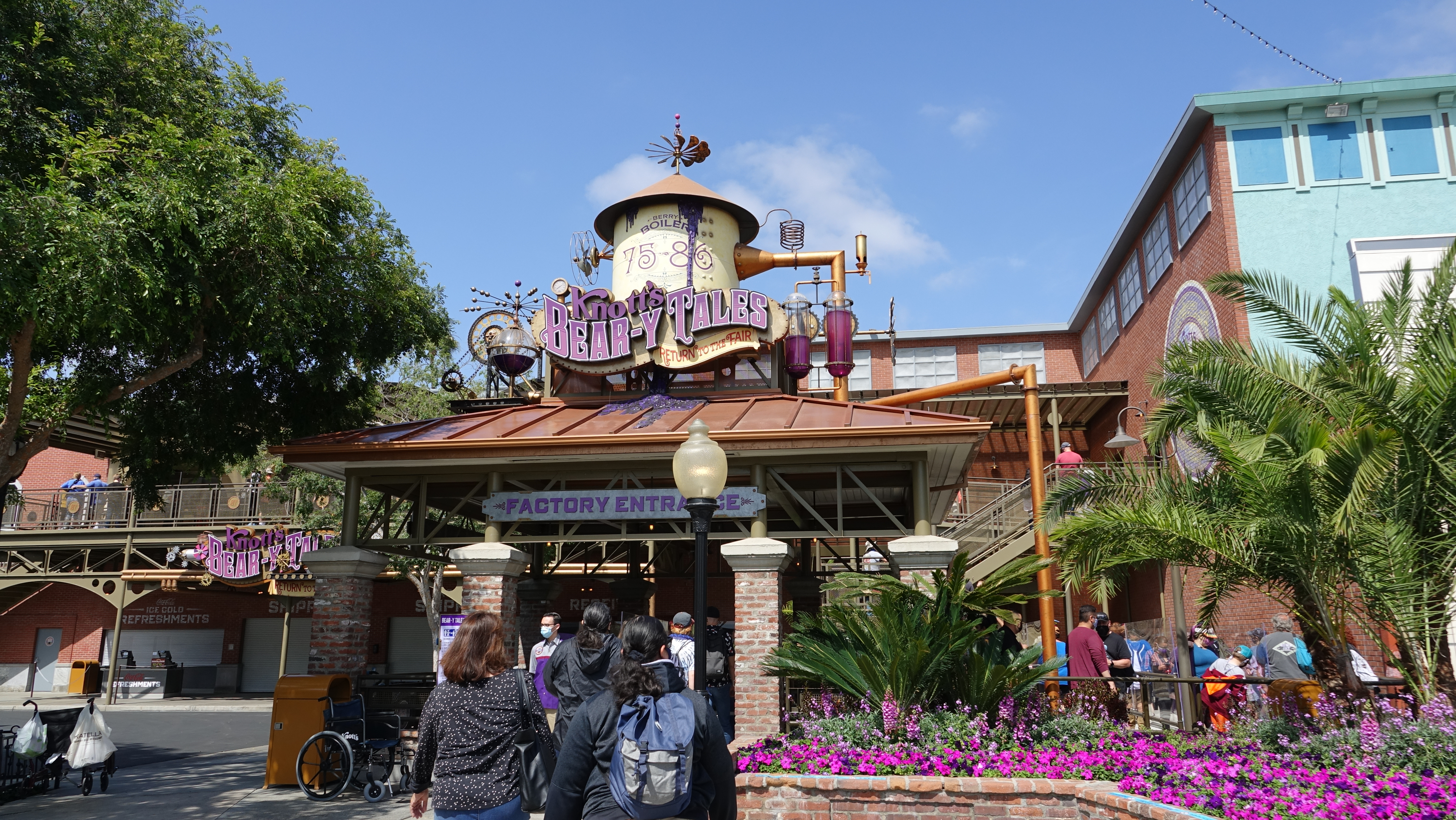
Knott's Bear-y Tales Return to the Fair ride entrance on its first day: May 6, 2021 to Knott's Season Pass Holders.

Knott's Bear-y Tales: Return To The Fair is a 4D interactive dark ride located at Knott's Berry Farm theme park in Buena Park, California. Designed by Triotech in conjunction with Knott's Berry Farm, the ride opened to the public on May 21, 2021, and season passholders were given access beginning May 6, 2021. The ride is a follow-up to the defunct dark ride Knott's Bear-y Tales, which operated in the same location from 1975 to 1986. The interactive dark ride, which passes through several scenes reminiscent of the original dark ride, features characters Boysen Bear and Girlsen Bear as they travel to the County Fair to win the blue ribbon prize for their boysenberry pies. Guests board red colored vehicles equipped with boysenberry jelly blasters, and the ride centers on stopping the notorious pie thief Crafty Coyote and his mischievous pups, who have stolen the boysenberry pies for themselves. The attraction replaced Voyage to the Iron Reef, which permanently closed on January 5, 2020.

== History ==
Following the closure of Knott's Bear-y Tales in 1986, the park has been faced with a demand from enthusiasts to bring the ride back. The popular ride was known for its originality and family-friendly ride atmosphere. At the IAAPA Expo on November 19, 2019, Knott's Berry Farm and Triotech made a joint announcement that Knott's Bear-y Tales would return to the park as a 4D ride experience. Its name was also revealed as Knott's Bear-y Tales: Return to the Fair. They consulted with the original ride's designer, Rolly Crump, along with his son Chris Crump.

The attraction was scheduled to open to the public in 2020 for Knott's 100th anniversary, but the park had been closed from March 2020 to May 2021 in response to the COVID-19 pandemic and two stay-at-home orders issued by California Governor Gavin Newsom, pushing the debut to 2021. Featured as the third release in the Amusement Dark collection, a branded initiative to construct a variety of video-game-based dark rides at Cedar Fair amusement parks, the ride opened to the public on May 21, 2021. Season passholders were able to ride earlier beginning on May 6, 2021. It replaced Voyage to the Iron Reef under the initiative. The experience uses 4D technology blended with physical props and set pieces. The Boysenberry smell and "Welcome One and All" soundtrack of the original ride were incorporated into the new design.

== Queue ==
Knott's Bear-y Tales: Return to the Fair reuses the indoor queue of the defunct Voyage to the Iron Reef. As part of the theming, the queue is designed to look like the Pie Factory from the outside. The indoor queue was enhanced with more theming and physical props. The room features fan-drawn and employee-drawn artwork of Bear-y Tales characters. The indoor queue and a portion of the ride's outer queue features purple paw prints, suggesting that Crafty's pups have invaded the factory. There are many wanted posters for Crafty and each of his pups located in both the standby indoor queue as well as the alternative guest pass line. In addition, the room features a big faux oven with ingredient bag props.

== Ride layout ==
Knott's Bear-y Tales: Return to the Fair uses 600 ft of track. As with the original ride, Knott's Bear-y Tales: Return to the Fair follows the same order of the ride scenes as the original. They include the famous Bear-y family boysenberry pie factory, Frog Forest, Fortune Teller Camp, Thunder Cave, Weird Woods and the County Fair. The ride begins with the trolley vehicles entering the pie factory, which is featured in two scenes. As the ride transitions to the frog forest scene, riders leave the pie factory with a view of a chug machine prop with the number 27. The frog forest scene features 3 scenes. The scene scene features backlit flower and water projections. The Fortune Teller Camp features a 3 tents with interactive projections. The thunder cave features no projection screens. However, unlike the other screens on the ride, Thunder Cave features physical props and blacklight. Weird Woods features two projections screens. One features the coyote pups exiting a crashed boysenberry cart onto a tree and other where the pups enter the Weird Juice tub. The County Fair has 4 projection screens, and above the ride vehicles are fair and tree branch decorations. The ride ends with physical props of the entire Bear-y family and a spot where riders can view their high scores.

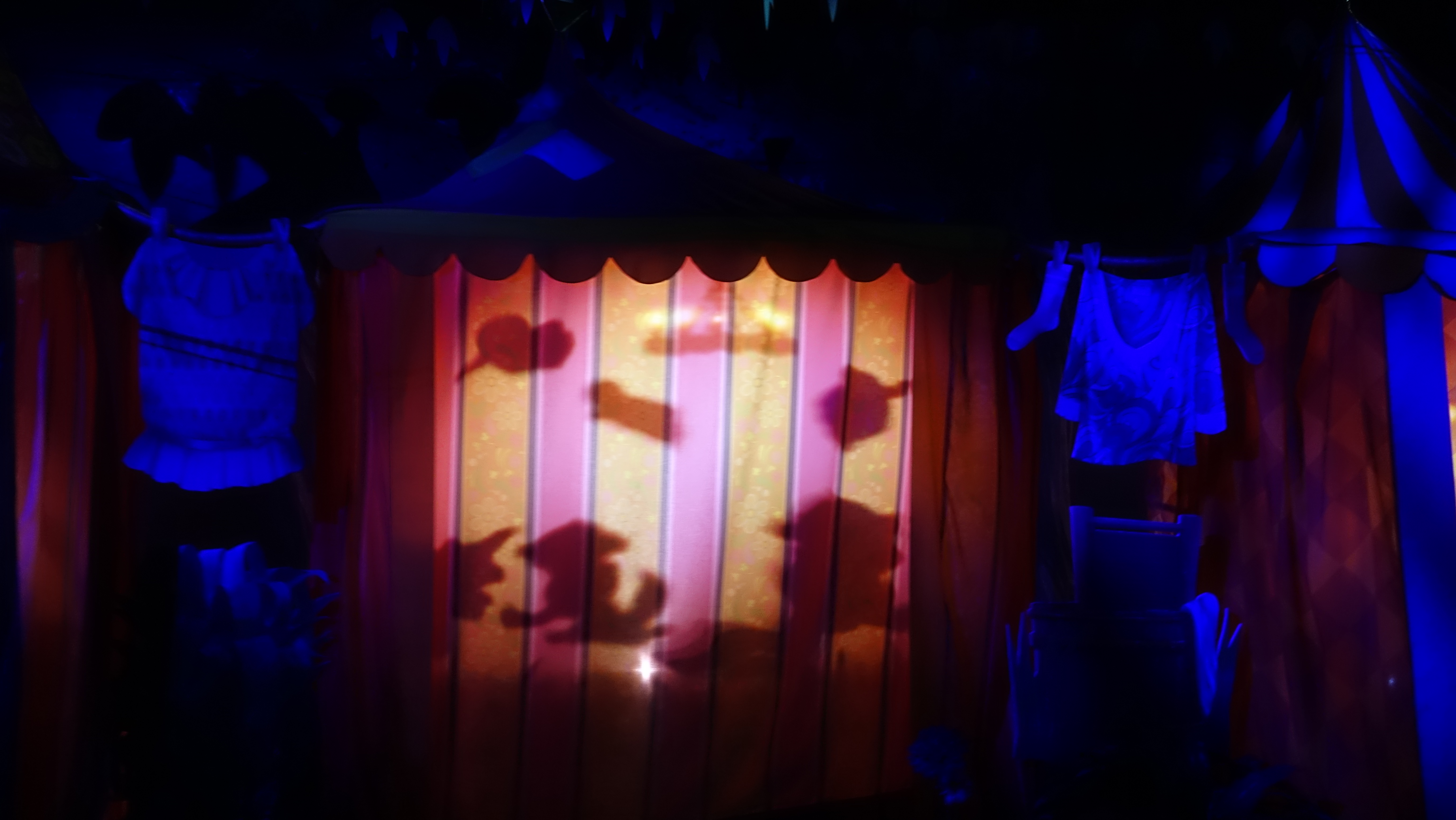
Knott's Beary Tales: Return To The Fair features multiple physical props. New technology includes riders blasting the coyote pups on projection shadows.

== Ride experience ==
While the original dark ride incorporated animatronics and physical sets, the re imagined version incorporates 3D animation blended with physical props, sets, figures as well as wind effects. The ride can be experienced as interactive where riders use the boysenberry blaster to capture the stolen boysenberry pies. Conversely, riders can experience the ride as a traditional dark ride and visually take in the surrounding experience. One particular feature which also returns from the original is the famous boysenberry aroma, which is featured in the Bear-y family pie factory. All of the ride screens blend the large projection screens with black lighting physical props and sets. One major new advancement technology developed by Triotech is interactive shadows. Wind effects are used in the Weird Woods, Thunder Cave and County Fair scenes.

== Photo gallery ==
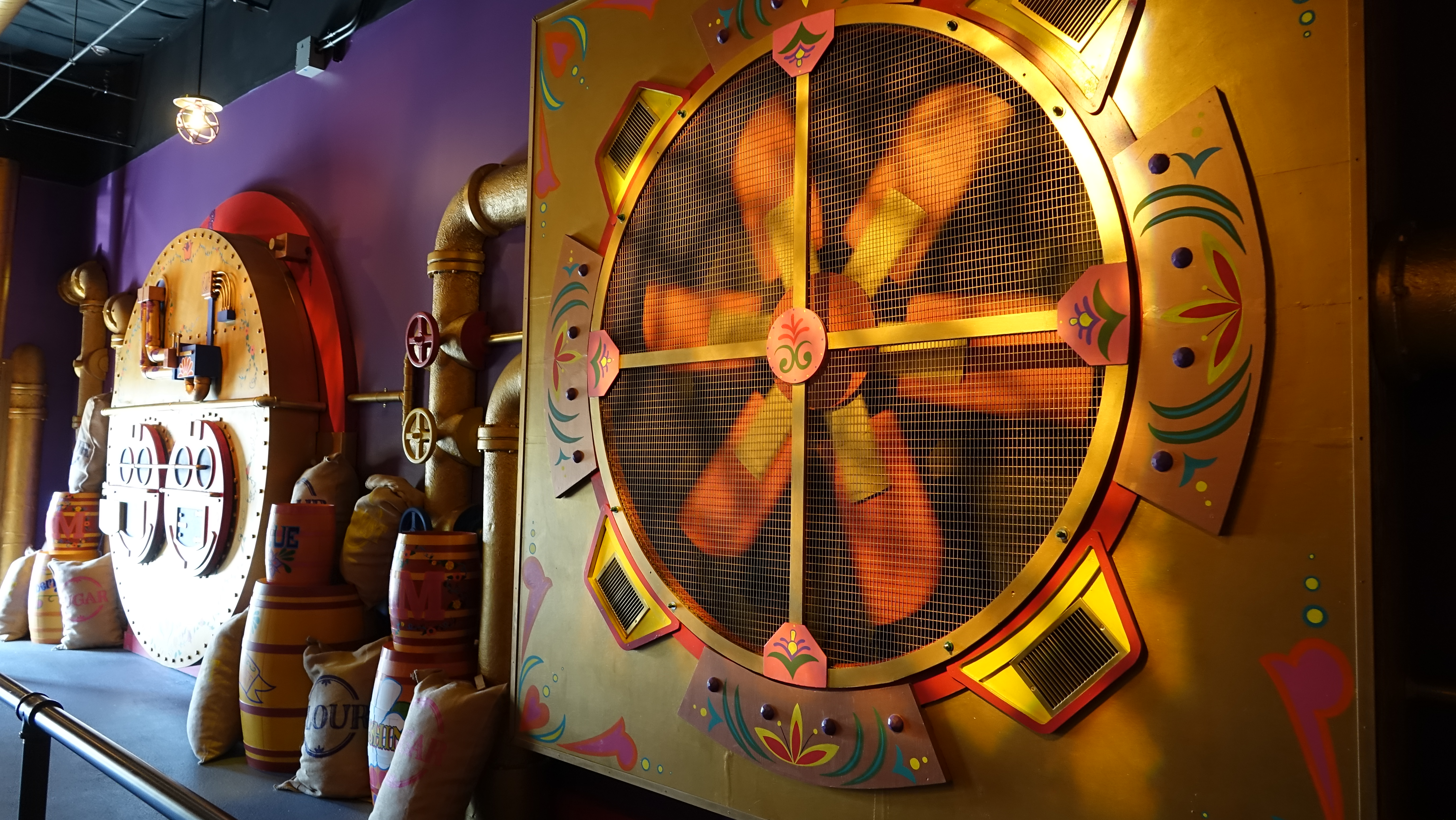
Enhanced theming in the ride's indoor queue

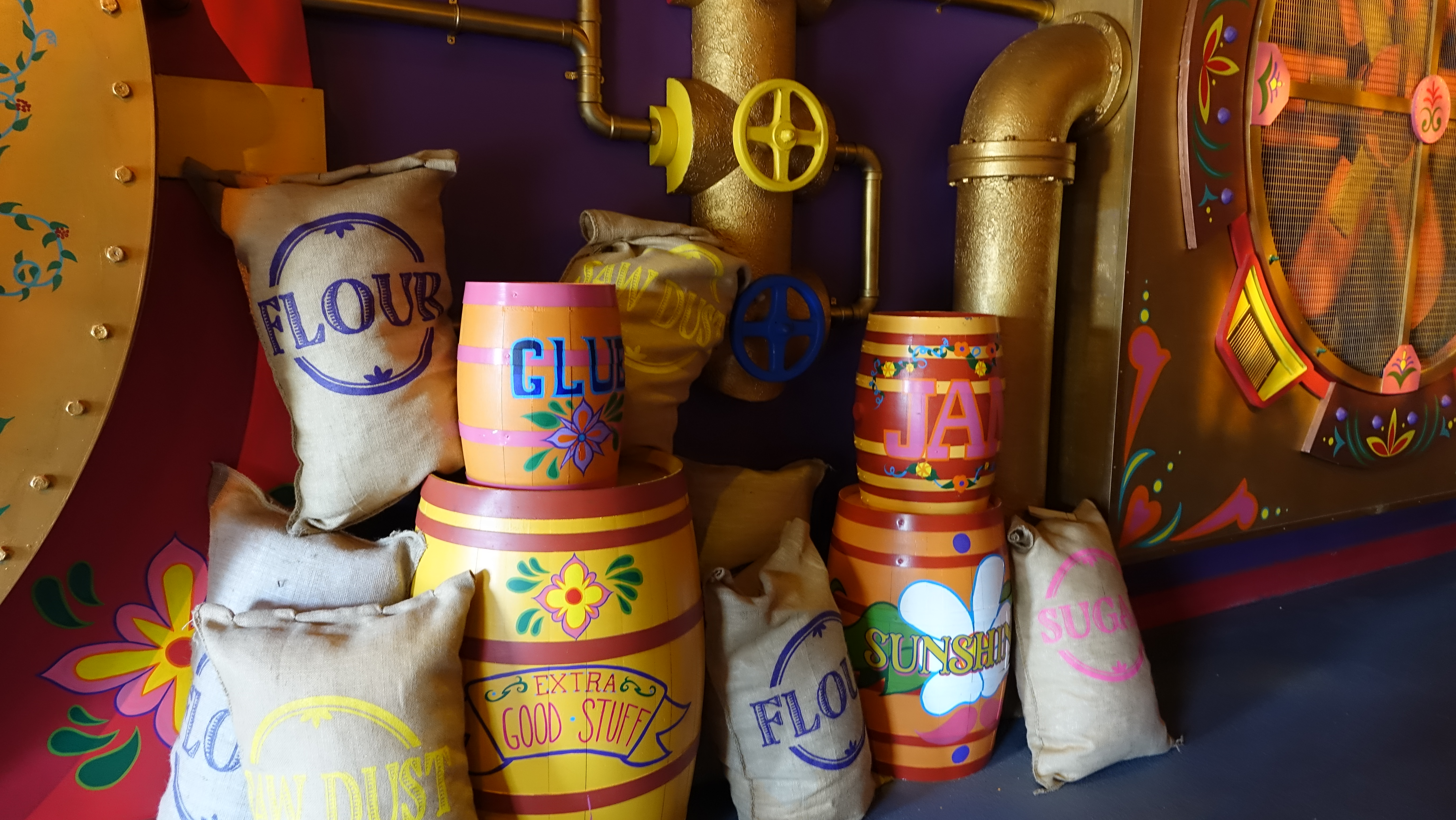
Indoor queue theming

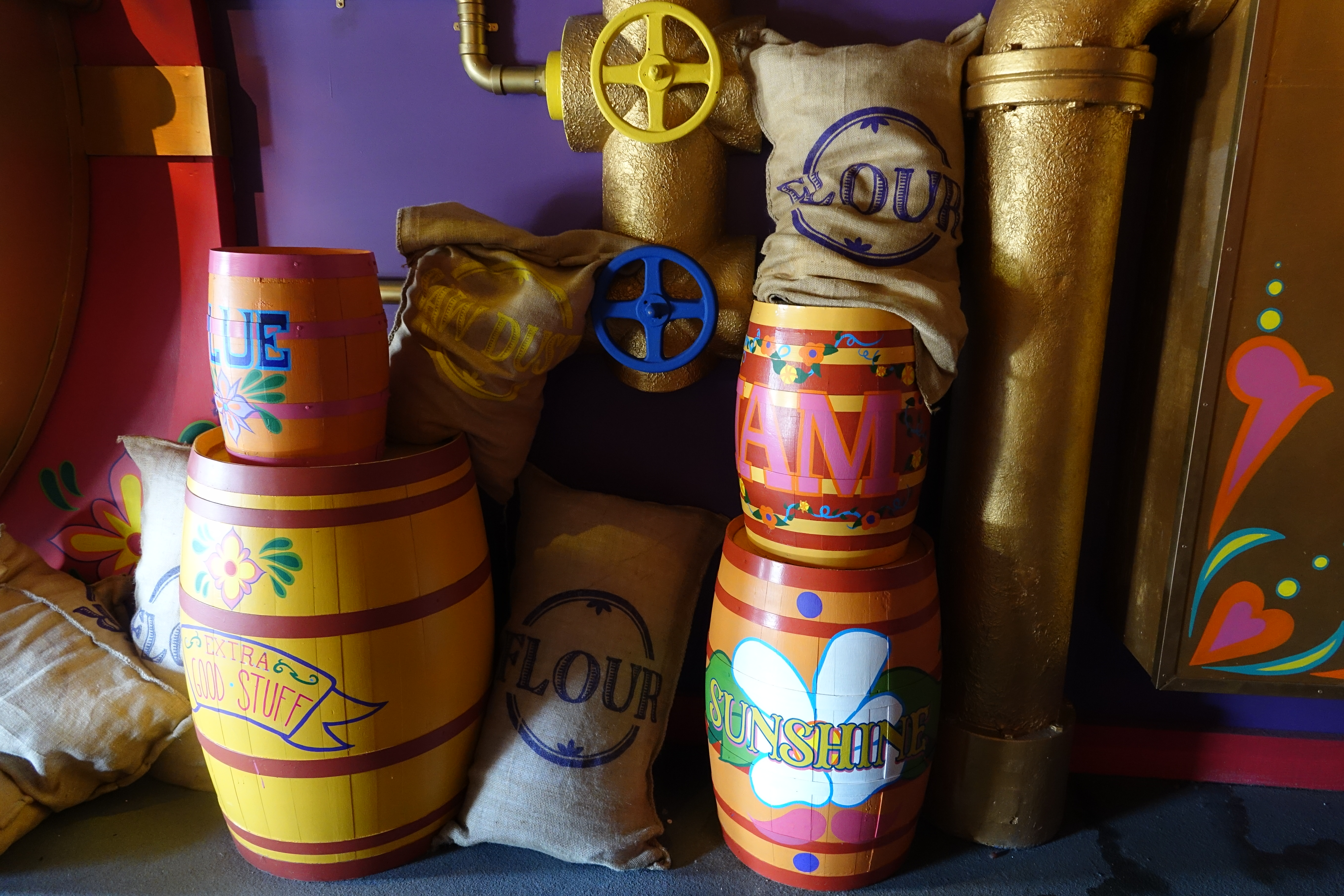
Theming in the line queue. Boysenberry pie ingredients

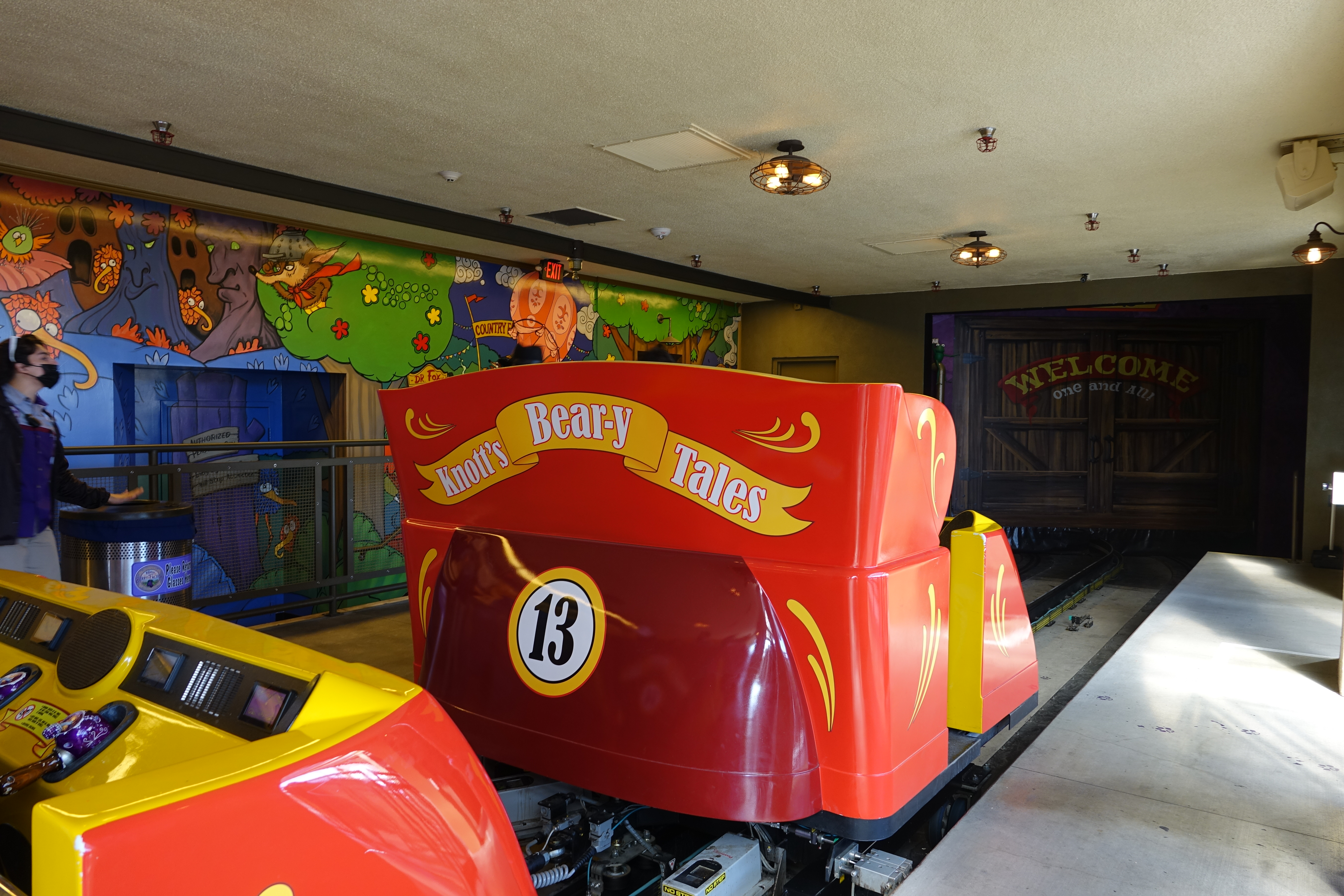
Ride vehicles departing the loading station. The loading station features a hand drawn painting of the logo and some ride scenes.

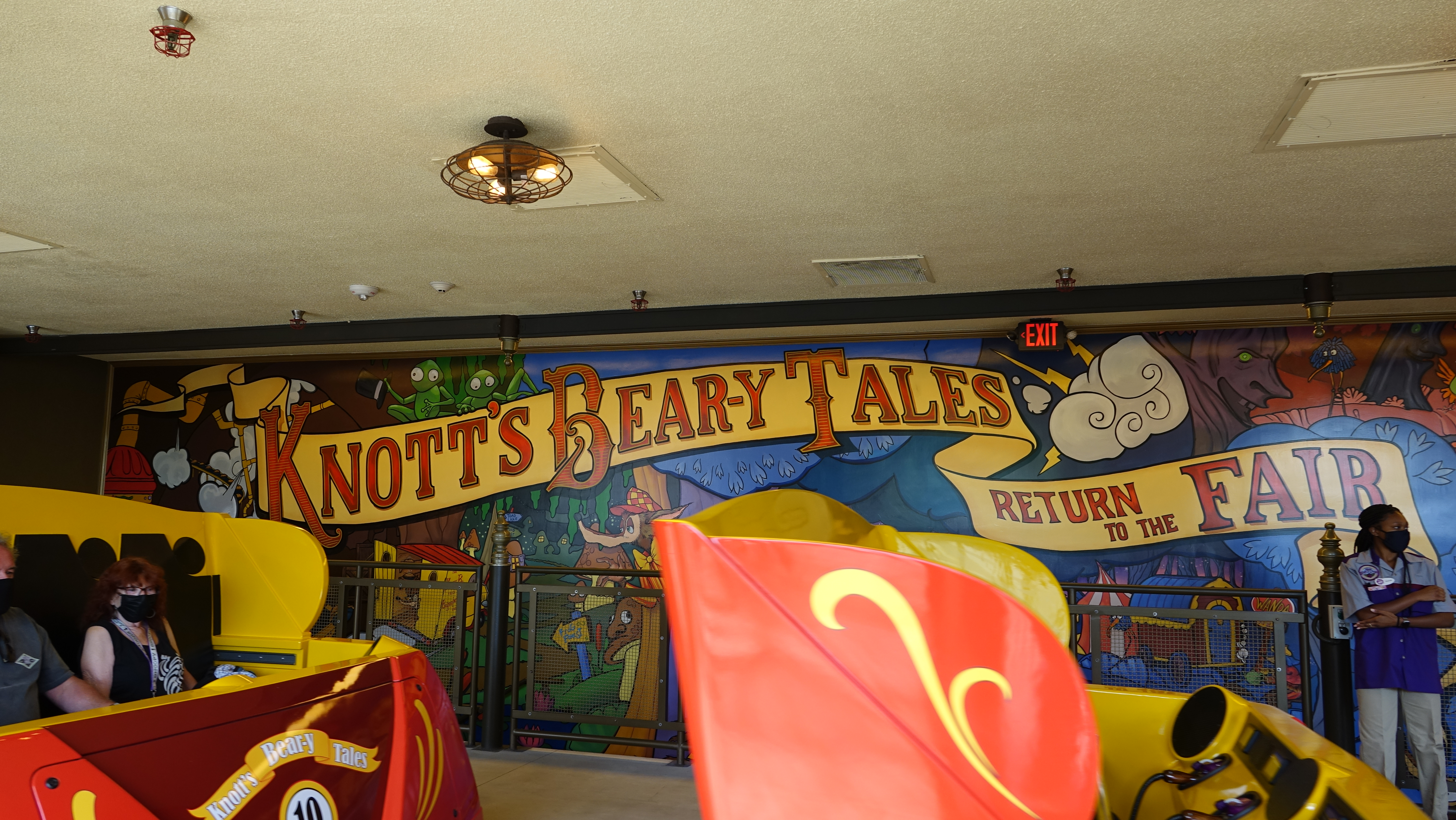
Station with the ride's trolley vehicles.

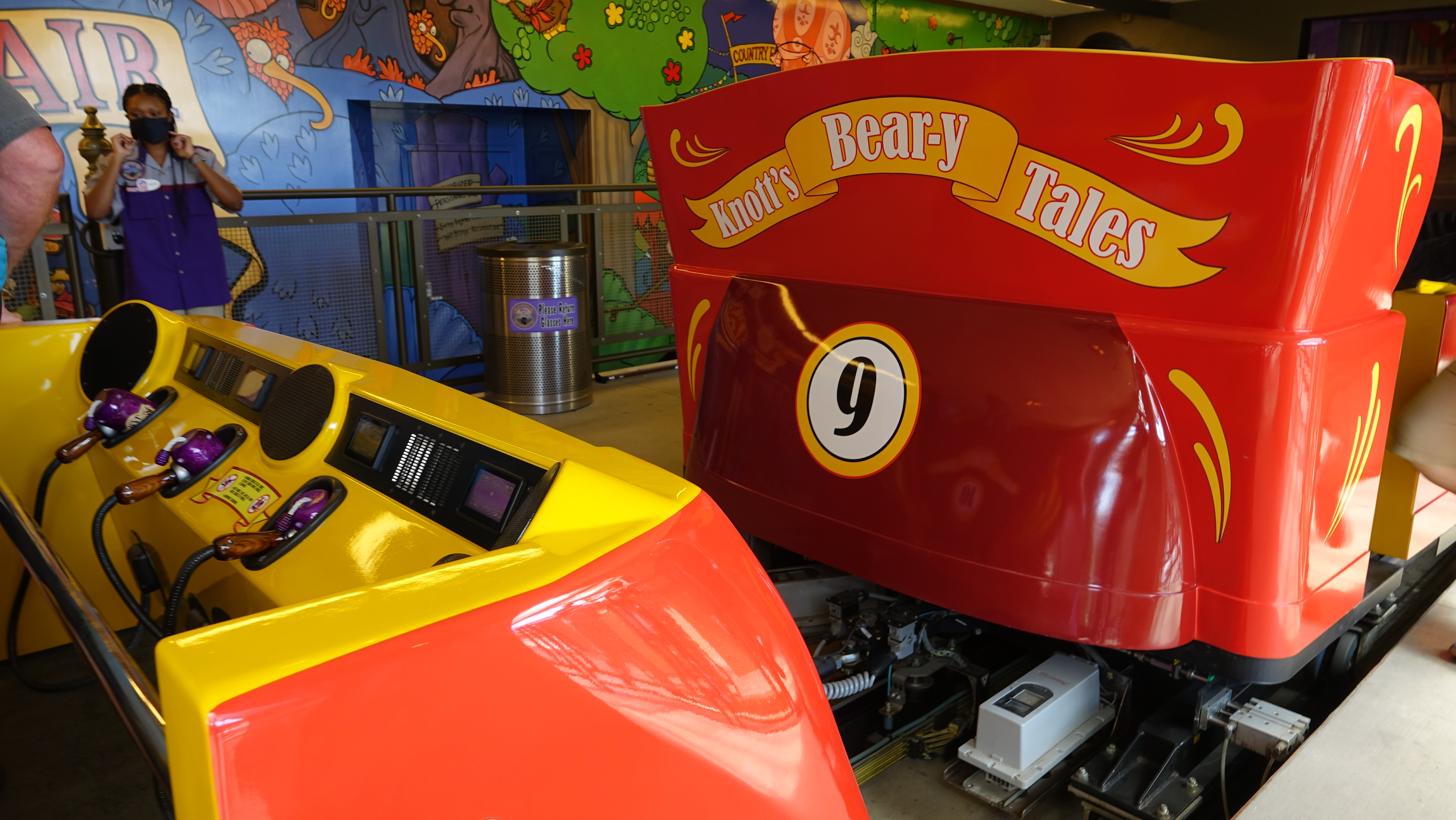
Ride vehicles

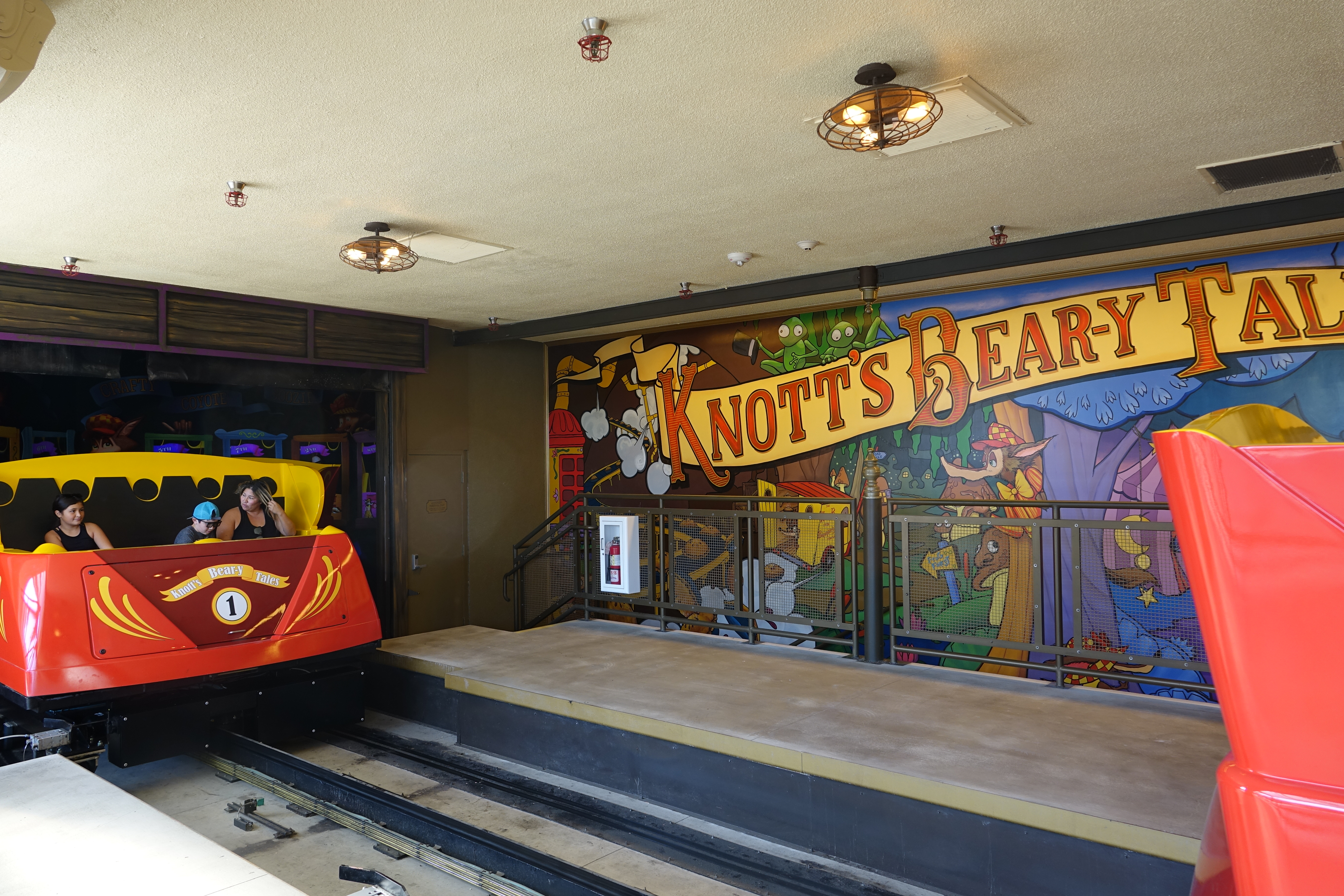
Ride vehicle approaches the Knott's Bear-y Tales Return to the Fair loading station

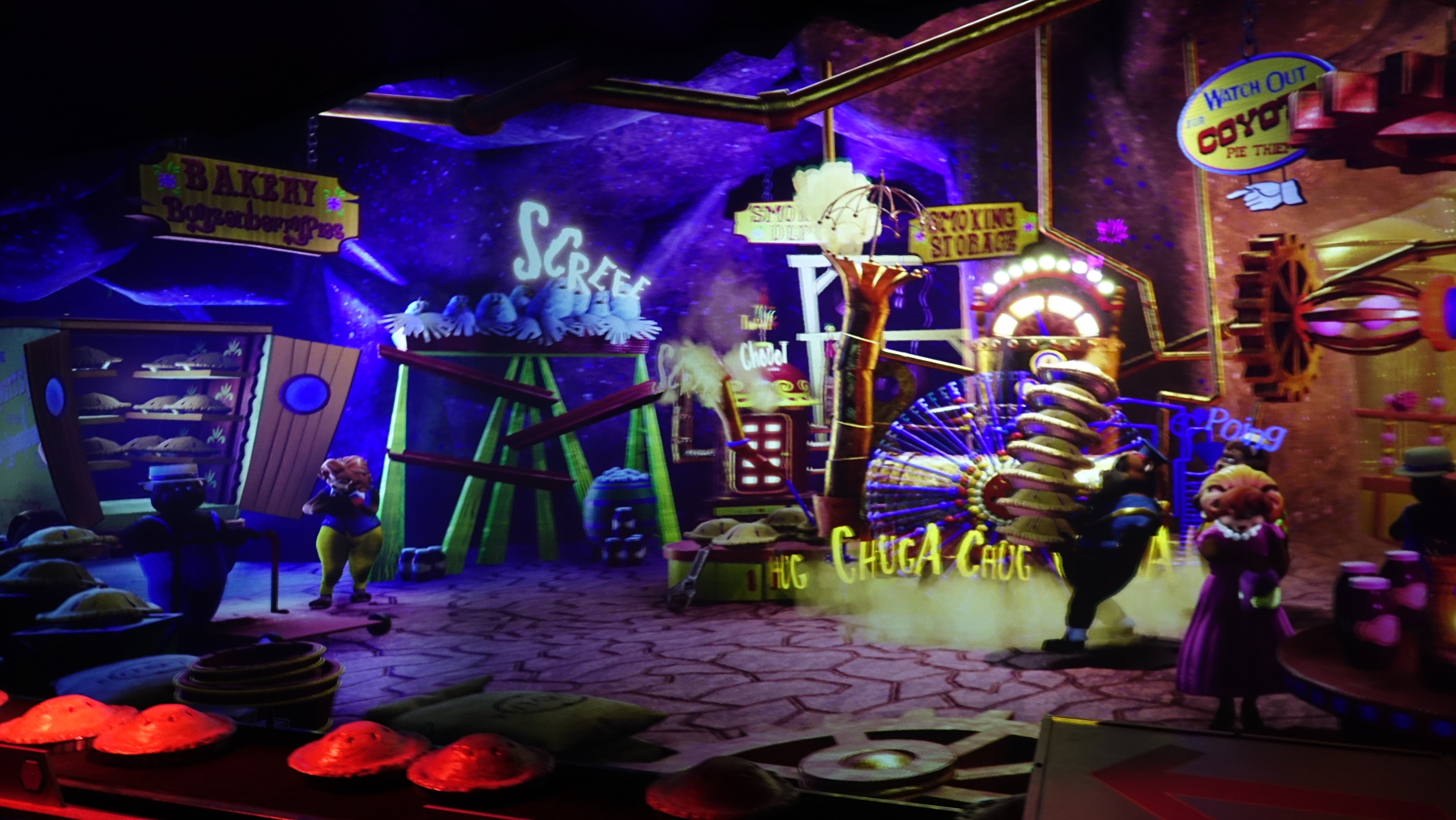
The reimagined Bear-y family boysenberry pie factory. The boysenberry smell is featured in this scene.

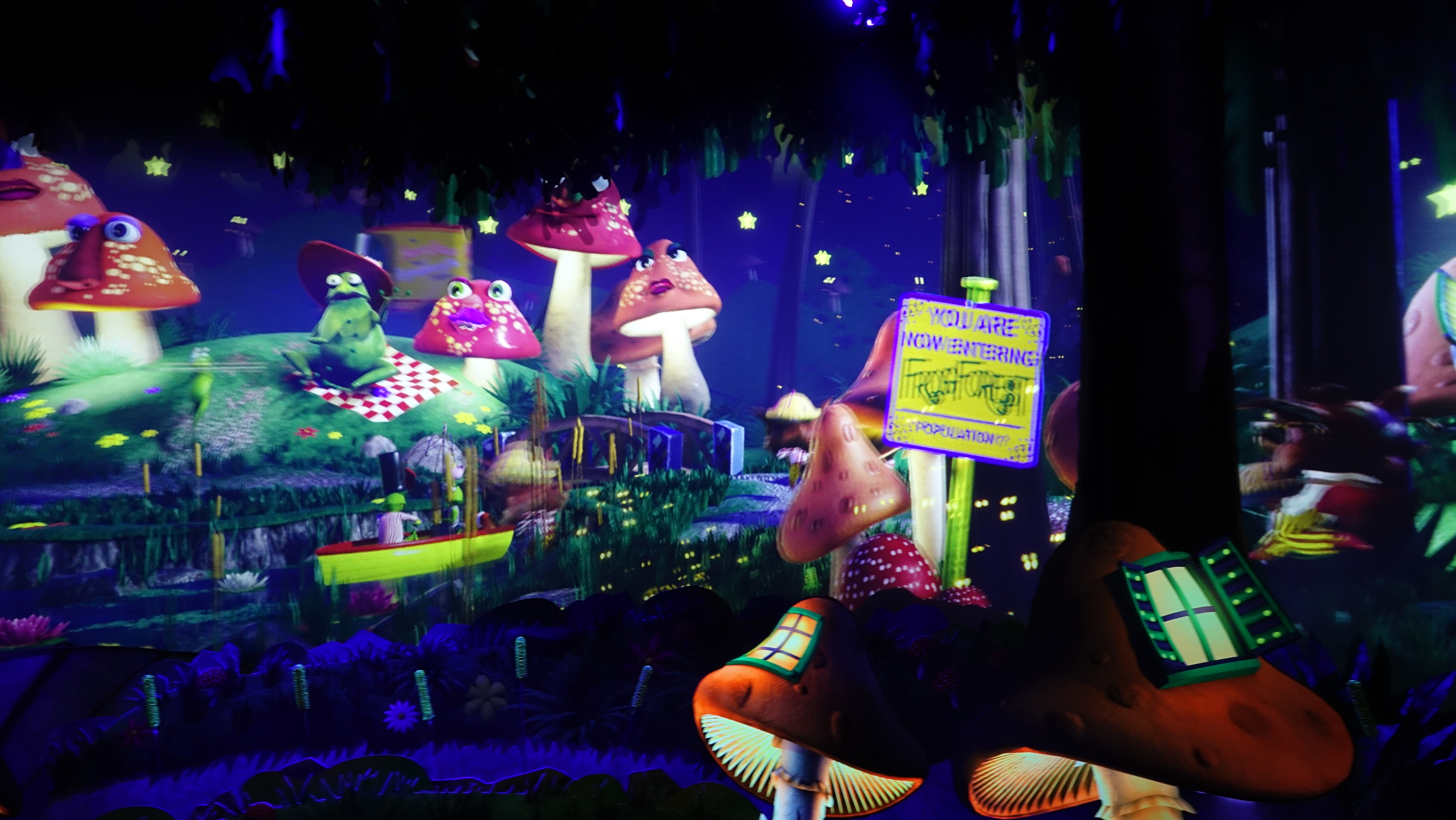
Frog Forest

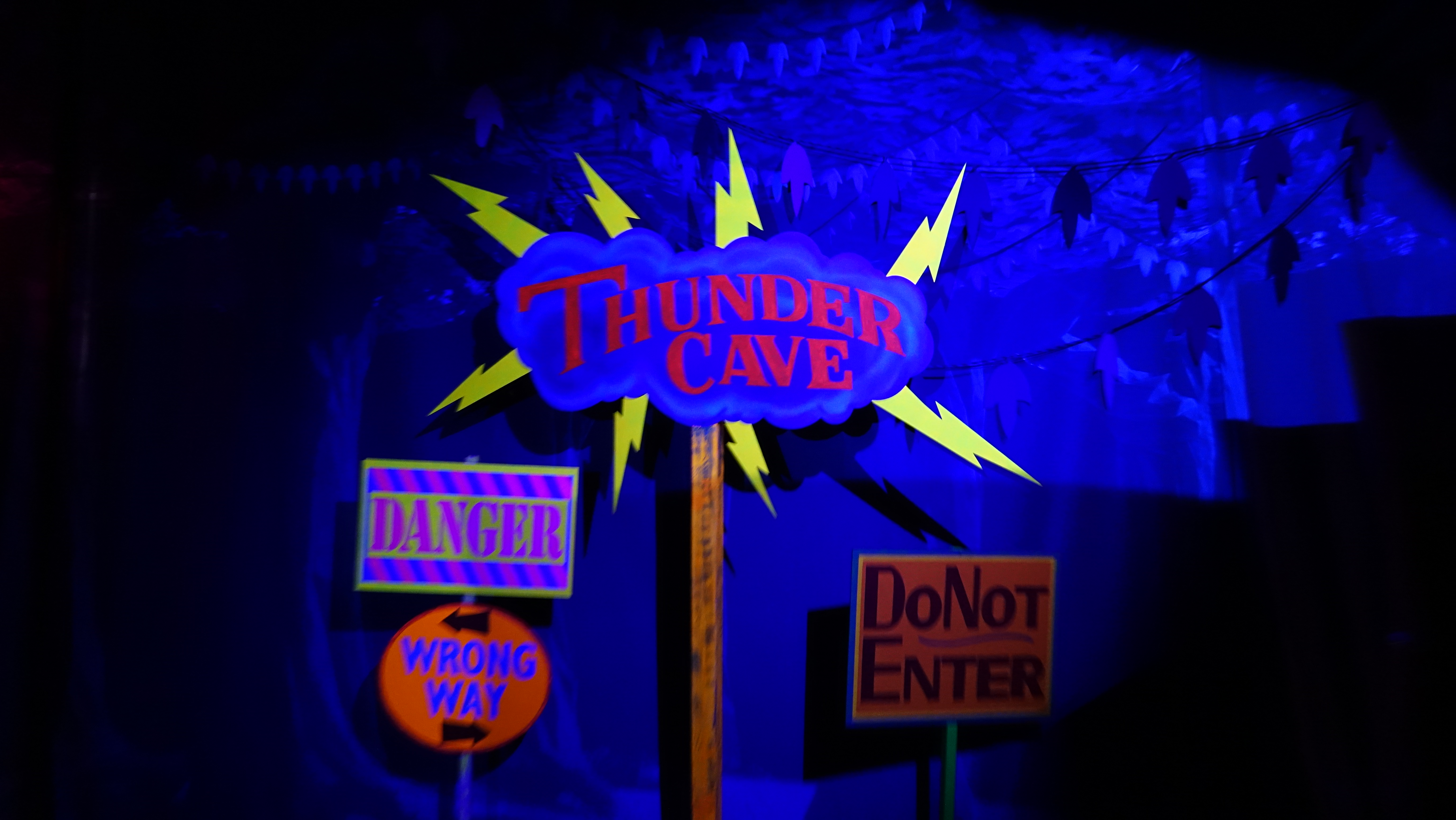
The entrance to Thunder Cave

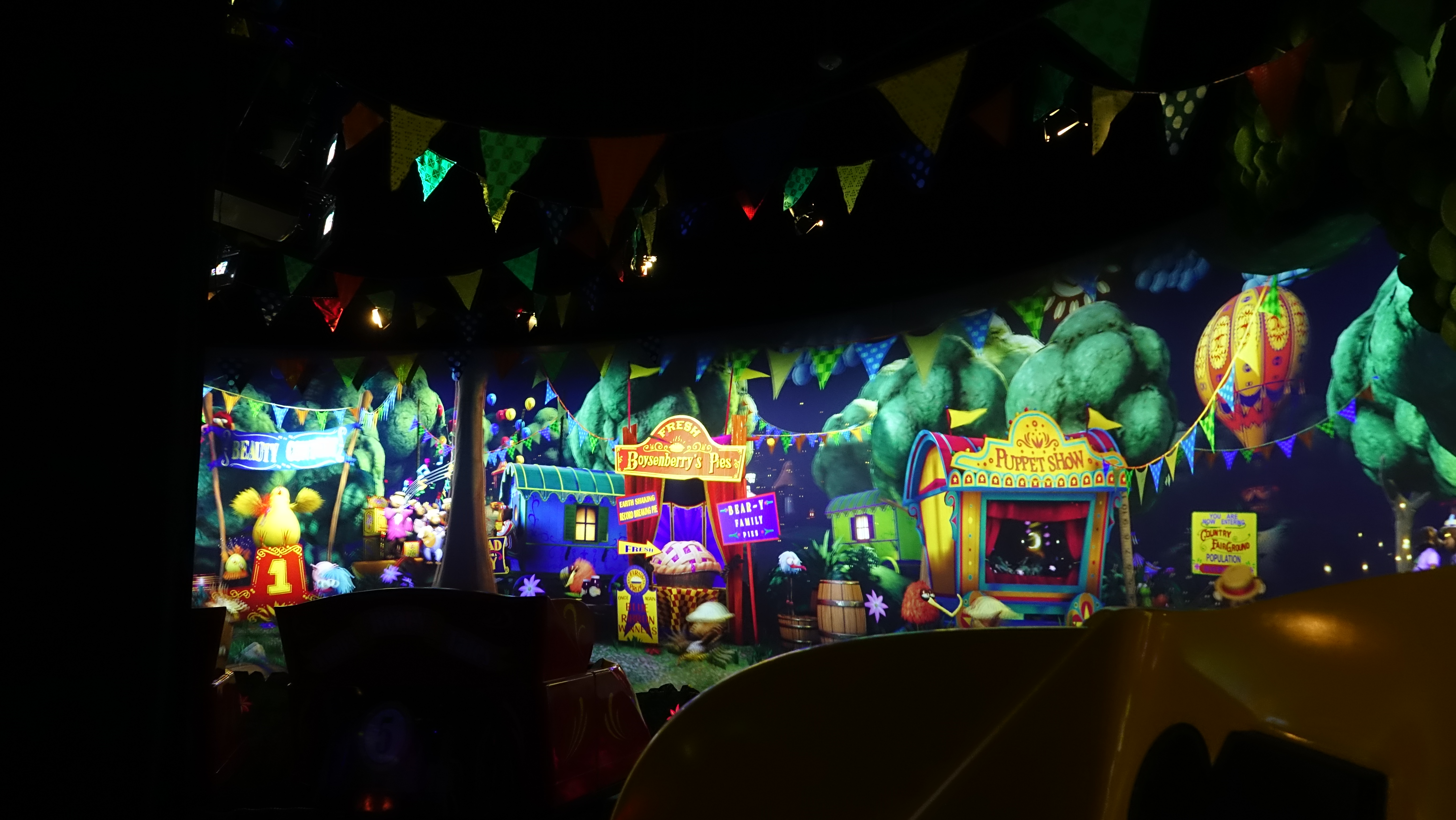
Overview of the County Fair scenes

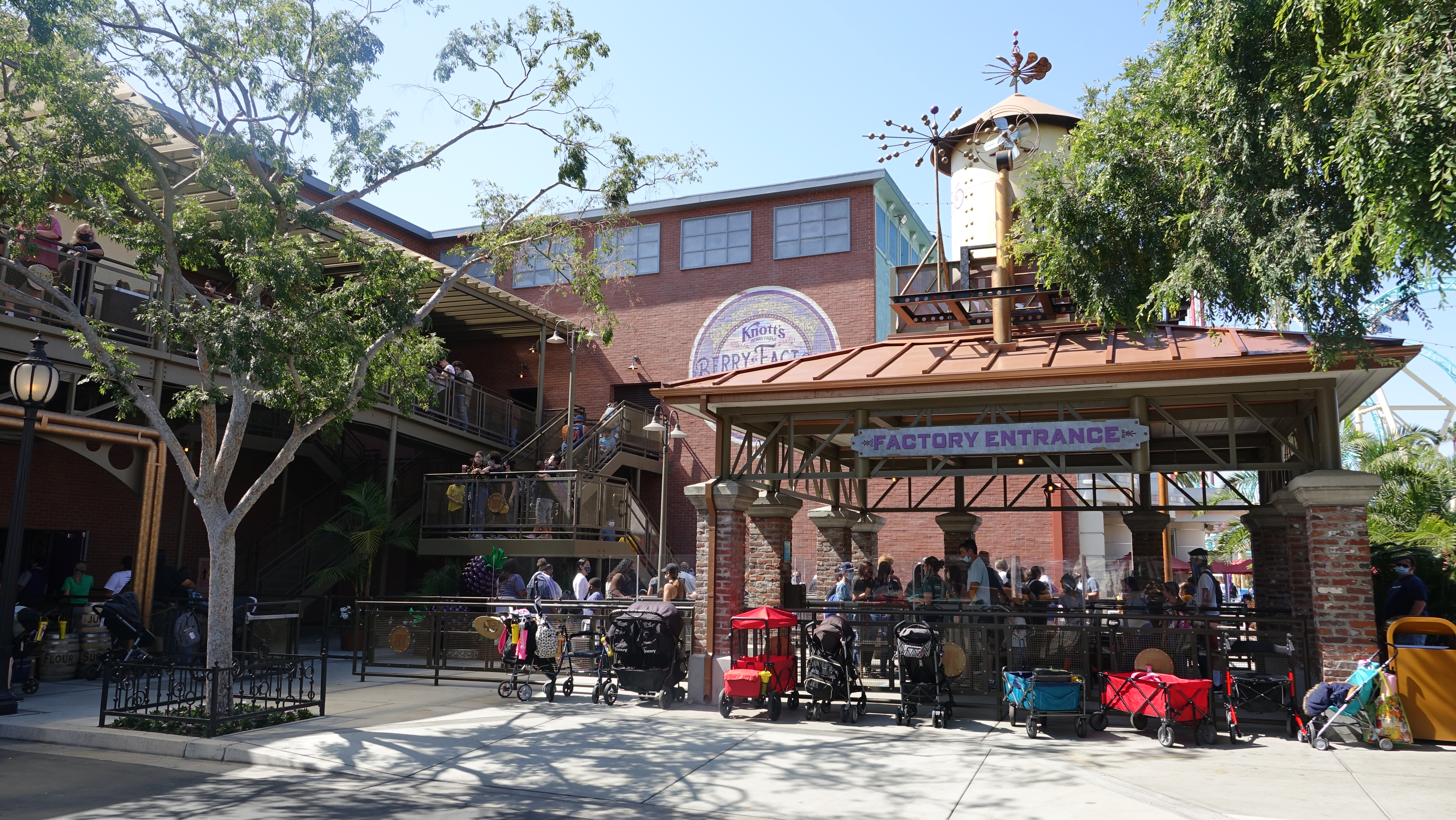
Ride entrance
