= Typhoon (simulator) =

- Developers: Avalanche Software (2005–2016); Triotech
- Publisher: Triotech
- Designer: N/A
- Platform: Arcade
- Release: N/A
- Genre: Motion simulator
- Mode: Up to 2 players

Typhoon (also expanded as Typhoon "Mad Wave" Motion Theater Deluxe) is a coin-operated media-based motion simulator created by Triotech. It is a 3D arcade machine that seats two and has 15 films where the seats shake and drop. The machine delivers up to 2 Gs of acceleration.

== Films ==
Original releases:

- Canyon Coaster
- Super Jets
- Road Fury/Grand Prix Raceway
- Astro Pinball
- Ravine Racer
- Haunted Mine
- Rats Race
- Speed Coaster
- Hover Chase
- Snow Ride
- The Night at the Toy Store
- Safari Adventure
- Road Hoggers
- Pirate Rapids
- Air Fighter

Nwave Exclusive films:

- Dino Safari
- Lost In Fear
- Speed Race
- Steam Speed
- The Wild West Mine Ride
