= Rolly Crump =

American animator (1930–2023)

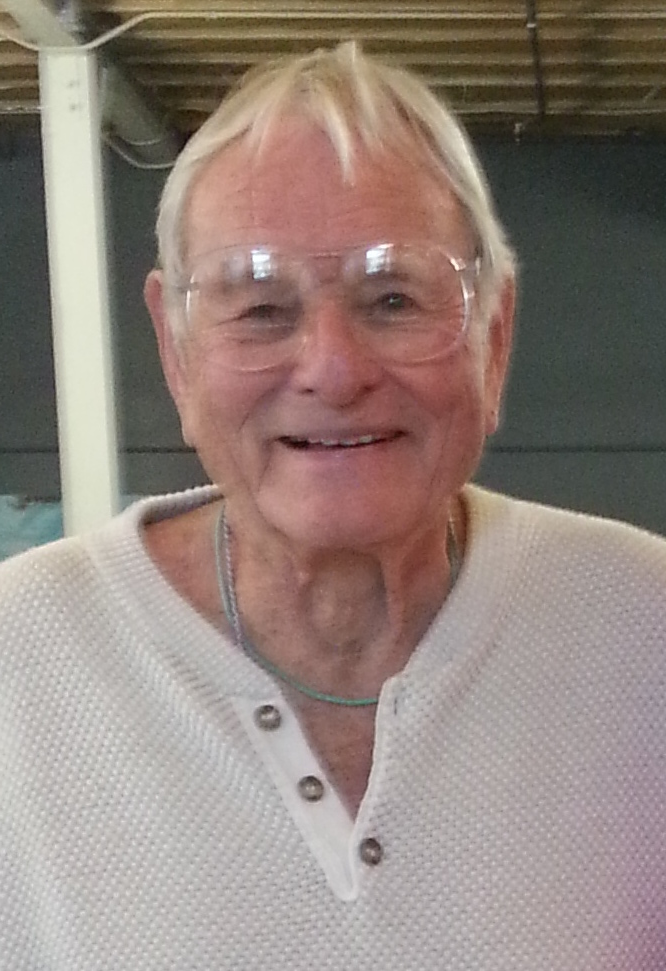
- Crump in 2013
- Born: Roland Fargo Crump; February 27, 1930; Alhambra, California, U.S.
- Died: March 12, 2023 (aged 93); Carlsbad, California, U.S.
- Occupations: Animator and designer

Roland Fargo Crump (February 27, 1930 – March 12, 2023) was an American animator and designer noted particularly for his work as a Disney Imagineer.

== Biography ==
Crump was born in Alhambra, California, and joined Walt Disney Studios in 1952. Initially he worked on inbetweening, before becoming an assistant animator on movies including Peter Pan, Lady and the Tramp, Sleeping Beauty, and One Hundred and One Dalmatians. In 1959 he joined WED Enterprises (later Walt Disney Imagineering) and became a designer of some of Disneyland's attractions and shops, including The Haunted Mansion, Enchanted Tiki Room and Adventureland Bazaar. As well as his work at Disney, he designed innovative and satirical psychedelic posters in the early and mid 1960s, including several for the West Coast Pop Art Experimental Band as well as logos for the band's singer Bob Markley. He also designed guitar string packaging for Ernie Ball.

He was responsible for designing many of the Disney attractions at the 1964 New York World's Fair, including It's a Small World, and its Tower of the Four Winds marquee. In 1966, when the attraction moved to Disneyland, he designed the large animated clock at the entrance that sends puppet children on a parade.

He contributed to early designs of the Magic Kingdom at Walt Disney World in Florida, and worked on designs for NBC's Disney on Parade in 1970, before leaving Disney to work on outside projects including Busch Gardens, the ABC Wildlife Preserve in Maryland, and Ringling Brothers & Barnum and Bailey Circus World. In 1975, Knott's Berry Farm opened Knott's Bear-y Tales, a dark ride designed by Crump. In 1976 he returned to work for Disney, designing the Land and Wonders of Life pavilions at the Epcot Center, before leaving again in 1981 to design the proposed Cousteau Ocean Center in Norfolk, Virginia, and to set up his own business, the Mariposa Design Group, which developed projects in Oman, Las Vegas, Denver and elsewhere. Crump finally returned to Disney in 1992 as executive designer at Imagineering, working on EPCOT Center.

He retired from Disney in 1996, and published an autobiography It's Kind of a Cute Story in 2012.

== Death ==
Crump died at his home in Carlsbad, California, on March 12, 2023, at the age of 93.
