= Wonder Mountain's Guardian =

4D interactive dark ride roller coaster at Canada's Wonderland amusement park

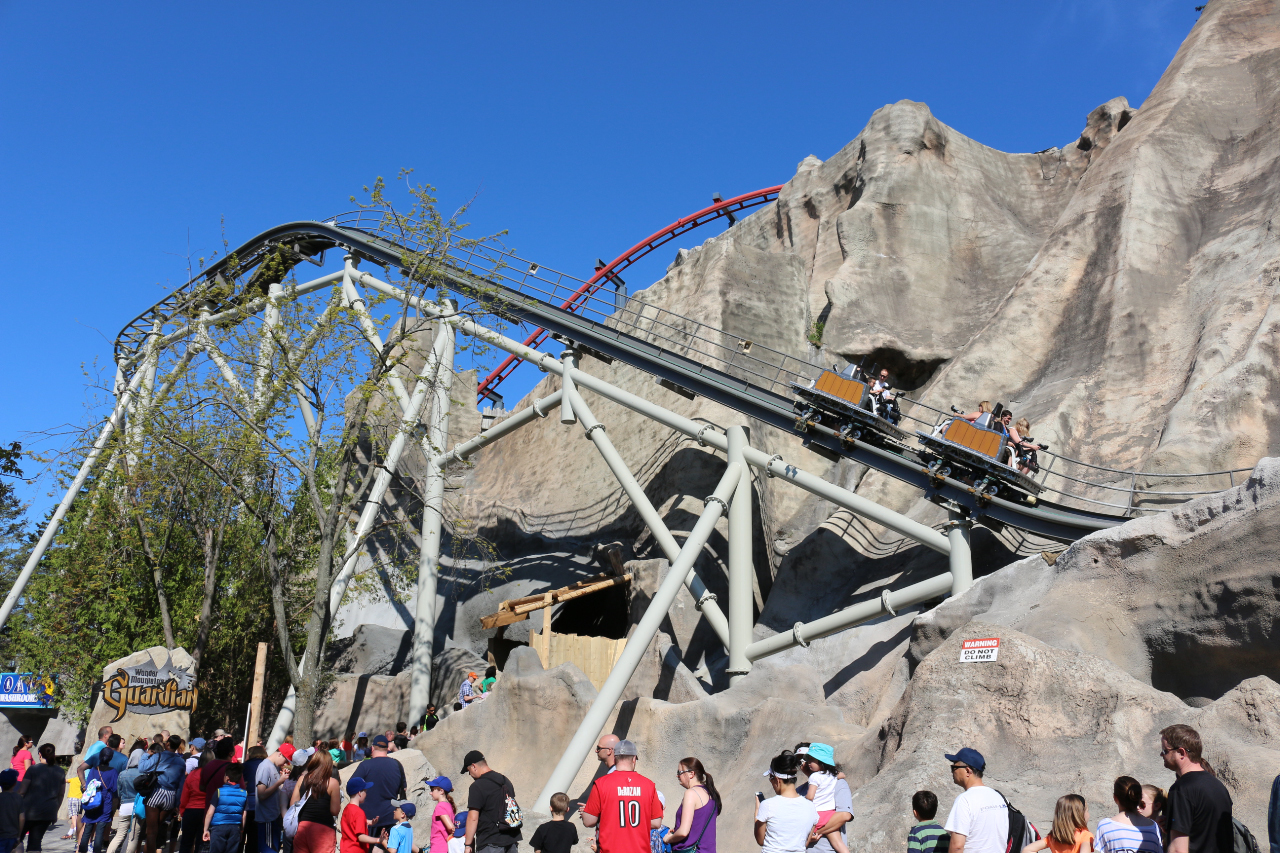
- Wonder Mountain's Guardian's lift hill outside Wonder Mountain

Canada's Wonderland
- Location: Canada's Wonderland
- Park section: Alpenfest - Wonder Mountain
- Coordinates: 43.84°N 79.54°W
- Status: Operating
- Opening date: May 24, 2014
- Cost: $10,000,000

General statistics
- Type: Steel
- Manufacturer: ART Engineering
- Designer: Triotech
- Model: 4D Interactive Dark Ride
- Lift/launch system: Chain lift hill
- Height: 18.3 m (60 ft)
- Length: 304.8 m (1,000 ft)
- Inversions: 0
- Duration: 3 minutes and 30 seconds
- Capacity: 650 riders per hour
- Height restriction: 107 cm (3 ft 6 in)
- Trains: 5 trains with 2 cars; riders arranged 2 across in 2 rows for a total of 8 riders per train
- Must transfer from wheelchair
- Wonder Mountain's Guardian at RCDB

Wonder Mountain's Guardian (also known as Guardian or WMG; during Halloween Haunt known as Zombies 4D) is a 4D, interactive dark ride roller coaster at the Canada's Wonderland amusement park located in Vaughan, Ontario, Canada. Park management first proposed a dark ride located inside Wonder Mountain around 2004. Technology and budget limitations at the time delayed the project's planning and design stages until 2011. The steel track was manufactured by ART Engineering; it is approximately 304.8 metres (1,000 ft) long and reaches a maximum height of about 18.3 metres (60 ft). The ride also features one of the largest drop tracks in the world reaching a height of 9.1 metres (30 ft).

Triotech designed the ride's interactive 3D animations, which are accompanied by other special effects such as wind, adding the fourth dimension. During the park's Halloween Haunt event in October, the animations are replaced with zombie-themed effects. Delays during construction delayed the ride's opening until May 24, 2014; three weeks after the 2014 season began. Guardian was inspired by the dragon in Thunder Run—another roller coaster located in the mountain area of the park—and Starlight Spectacular—a nightly light-and-sound show focused on Wonder Mountain.

== History ==
Canada's Wonderland's first interactive dark ride was Scooby-Doo's Haunted Mansion (renamed Boo Blasters on Boo Hill after Cedar Fair's purchase of the park), which opened in 2000. It was designed by Sally Corporation and relies entirely on physical sets and theming rather than projected animations, and uses basic, moving props. About four years later, park management began discussing the addition of a new attraction inside Wonder Mountain. The technology available at the time meant the cost of building a more advanced dark ride was too expensive for a regional amusement park. In 2011, as technology improved and the costs decreased, the park started planning a second interactive dark ride. Several companies were contacted to design the audio-visual portion of the future ride; park management chose Triotech to do so.

Speculation that Canada's Wonderland would build a new attraction for the 2014 season began at the end of July 2013 when maintenance work on the western side of Wonder Mountain was discovered. On August 8, Cedar Fair confirmed an interactive dark ride would be built at one of the company's parks. Wonderland officially announced Wonder Mountain's Guardian—a ten million-dollar attraction—on August 30, 2013, on Breakfast Television, a morning news program for the Toronto area. During the International Association of Amusement Parks and Attractions (IAAPA) Attractions Expo 2013, the characters of the ride were revealed during president and CEO of Cedar Fair Matt Ouimet's keynote address.

The first pieces of track and other parts from Germany arrived at the park in mid-January 2014. A month later, installation of the track began inside the mountain. By the end of February, erection of the framing for the 3D screens began. By the beginning of March, support columns for the outside portion of the ride were installed. The lift hill was completed at the beginning of April. The park opened to the public on May 4 but the opening of Guardian was delayed. On May 24, the park announced that the ride had opened. The entire project involved 10 contractors and at least 47 workers.

On November 7, 2013, Cedar Fair announced that during Halloween Haunt, Guardian would be altered to a zombie-themed ride. The name of this version of the attraction was later revealed to be Zombies 4D.

== Ride experience ==
This attraction will provide [...] an exhilarating, and unique ride experience unlike any other attraction in the park; immersing [riders] in an extraordinary adventure and engaging their senses from start to finish.

— General Manager of Canada's Wonderland, Norm Pirtovshek

When Guardian first opened, Fast Lane was available to guests but within the first week of operation the Fast Lane option was removed. Riders must be at least 107 centimetres (42 in) tall to ride with an adult or 122 centimetres (48.0 in) to ride alone.

The experience is dependent upon the location of rider's seat on the train. Screens are located on both sides of the track but the only continuous screen on the track is on the right-hand side. The train makes several tight turns during the ride; riders facing forward experience all the animations while riders facing backward miss some scenes because of the lack of screen space. The cars rotate 90 degrees clockwise to face the screens; forward-facing riders rotate toward the continuous screen.

=== Wonder Mountain's Guardian ===
The layout of the ride once inside Wonder Mountain leading up to the drop track. The graphics are those from the Wonder Mountain's Guardian version.

In the ride's narrative of events preceding those that occur during the ride, King Adelsten entered the mountain to fight a dragon called Ormaar. During the battle, the king lost his crown. Stansein, one of the king's servants, guides riders through the mountain to find and retrieve the crown. Throughout the ride, riders can score points by hitting objects on the screen with their light guns. At the end, the highest scores are placed in the 'Wonder Mountain's Guardian Hall of Fame'.

After the train leaves the station, it turns 180 degrees right and exits the mountain, leading into a 18.3-metre (60 ft) chain lift hill. Once at the top, the train enters a shallow, right-hand drop, crossing over Vortex's first drop as it runs along the side of the mountain. It makes a banked right turn back into the mountain, then a tarpaulin drops, blocking the entrance to prevent light from entering. The train slows and the cars rotate 90 degrees to face the screens. Stansein tells riders to prepare to battle the enemies. The first scene takes place in forest environment where riders fight Sneaky Spiders and Beasty Bats. At the end of the first scene, riders who began the ride facing forward see Stansein's first appearance, in which he points in the direction riders should go next. Backward-facing riders do not see this transition. In the next scene, riders—who are surrounded by a lake inside the mountain—battle Wet Ones and Crazy Crabs. The scene starts above the surface of the water but later moves downwards. As the scene ends, the train passes two waterfalls; this transition is absent for backward-facing riders.

Riders then arrive in an underground city named Draconian City, where they battle against Draconians and Archers. Nearing the finale, forward-facing riders see Stansein making his final appearance, following the train. Riders are then confronted by more Draconians and Archers before entering a gold-covered area where King Adelsten's crown is found. Soon after, Ormaar arrives and breathes fire toward the ground. After a few seconds, the drop track releases the train into a 9-metre (30 ft) free fall, escaping from Ormaar. As the train leaves the drop track, the trains are rotated to their original positions and all of the riders' scores are displayed on both sides of the track. After turning left into the station, riders disembark and the next riders board. One cycle of the ride lasts approximately three-and-a-half minutes.

=== Zombies 4D ===
In the ride's Zombies 4D version, riders score points for shooting zombies and police badges found throughout the ride, but lose points if they shoot civilians.

After the train is dispatched and enters Wonder Mountain, riders find themselves in a graveyard where zombies are roaming. At the end of the scene, riders who began facing forward see a survivor directing them to the next scene. Riders who were seated backwards do not see this transition. The next scene takes place in a house overrun by the zombies and large spiders. At the end of the scene a truck crashes into the house. Riders then leave the house and pass the survivor; this transition is again absent for backward-seated riders. The train continues to a road with zombies, where three cars with zombies on them join the riders. Two of the cars crash at the end of the scene. The train then passes through a tunnel with abandoned cars; this scene is absent for riders facing backward. Riders then battle the zombies for the final time before entering the drop track sequence. The names of the highest-scoring riders are displayed on a leader-board for this version of the attraction.

== Characteristics ==
=== Trains ===
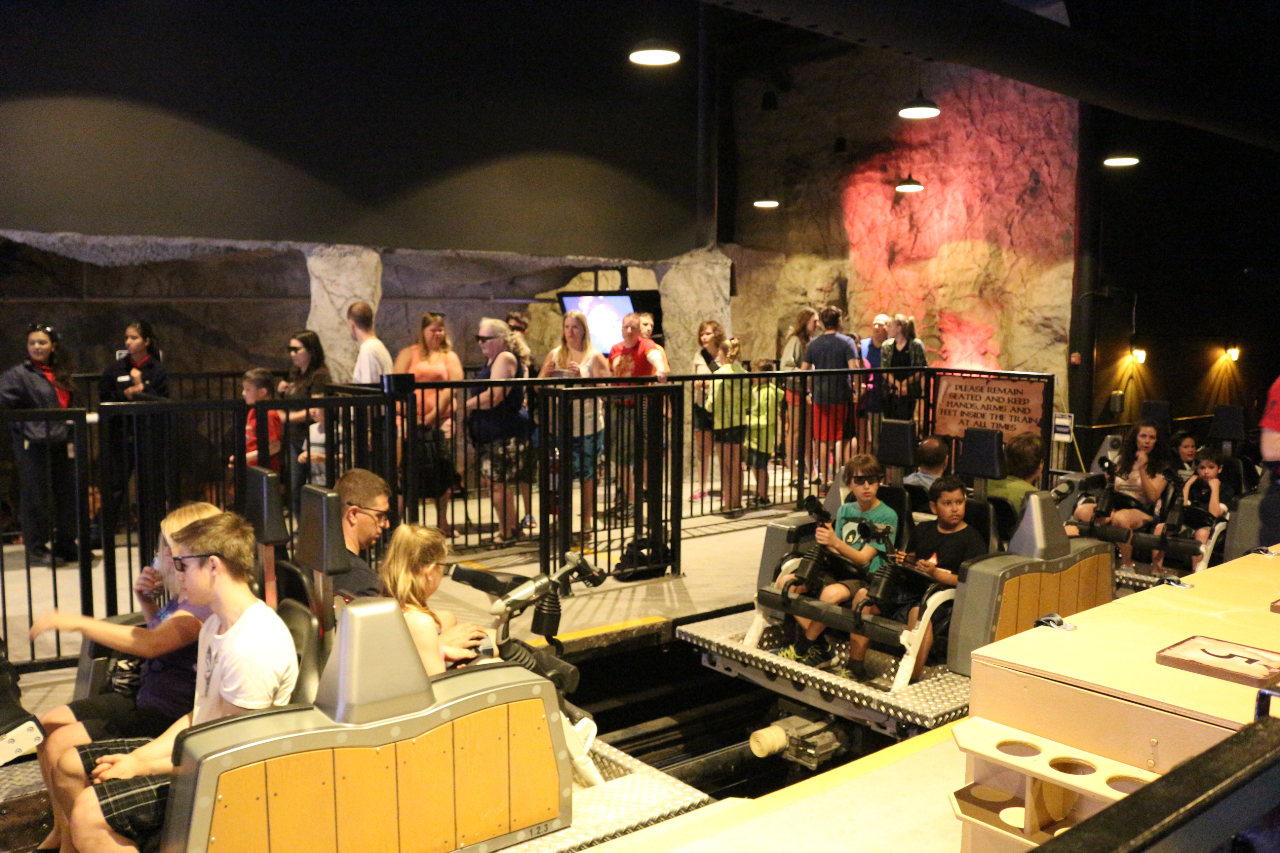
Ride trains at Wonder Mountains Guardians station, situated inside the mountain

Guardian operates with five trains, each containing two cars that were manufactured by Art Engineering. Each car seats four riders back-to-back in seated rows; each train can seat eight riders. Every seat has a lap-bar restraint, a light gun, and a loudspeaker that provides sound during the ride. This configuration allows the ride to theoretically carry 650 riders per hour. The cars can rotate 90 degrees in both directions. The trains' light guns are programmed to display a unique colour on the ride's screens to indicate where each rider is shooting and to distinguish between shooters.

=== Track ===
The steel track of Guardian is approximately 304.8 metres (1,000 ft) long and the lift is about 18.3 metres (60 ft) high; it was manufactured by Kubes Steel located in Stoney Creek, Ontario. The outside portion of the track is grey and has beige supports; indoor portions of the ride's infrastructure are painted black. When the train is inside the mountain, drive tires move the trains along the track. The drive tires and other moving parts within the track system were manufactured by Art Engineering.

At the end of the interactive part of the ride, there is a 9-metre (30 ft) free-fall drop track, a movable piece of track that can be released into free fall. As of 2019, this roller coaster element has only been used on eight coasters in the world. Once the train exits the drop track, the track returns to its starting position for the next train. Both Polar X-plorer at Legoland Billund Resort and Thirteen at Alton Towers have vertical drop tracks that release riders into a 5-metre (16.4 ft) drop. Verbolten at Busch Gardens Williamsburg has a drop track measuring 5.5 metres (18 ft). Hagrid's Magical Creatures Motorbike Adventure at Universal Orlando’s Islands of Adventure also contains a drop track measuring 5.1 metres (17 ft). While only a few roller coasters contain this element, the drop track used on Guardian is the largest one of its kind.

=== Screens ===
Guardian uses 64 720p projectors to display interactive content on the ride's screens. As the train enters the mountain, the cars rotate to face the screens. Because riders are seated both forwards and backwards, two sets of screens—one for each side— are required. Because Guardian makes tight turns, only the screen on the right-hand side of the track continuously shows content until the end. This screen holds the record for being the longest continuous interactive screen in the world, with a length of approximately 152.4 metres (500 ft) and a height of 4 metres (13 ft). The other screen is set up so that as one scene finishes, the transition scene that is seen on the continuous screen is skipped and the next scene begins soon after, keeping both screens in synchronization. Because no physical sets are used in the attraction, the park management can change the film and theme of Guardian at any time.

=== Characters ===
The Wonder Mountain's Guardian version of the attraction features eight characters. Stansein is the riders' guide who leads them through the mountain. Crazy Crabs are characterized as attractive but dangerous. Beasty Bats are recognizable by their oversized fangs compared to those of regular bats. Sneaky Spiders have the ability to ambush riders and their bites contain venom. Archers fight with bows and arrows, and can move around quickly. Wet Ones are reptilian creatures similar to fish but they can walk on land. These reptiles are most dangerous when they are in the water. Draconians protect Draconian City and carry swords and shields. Ormaar is the dragon that lives inside the mountain and confronts riders at the end of the ride.

In the Zombies 4D version of the ride, a survivor of the zombie apocalypse replaces Stansein as the guide character; zombies are the enemy.

The 3D elements have since been removed, replaced with regular screens.

== Reception ==
Brady MacDonald from Los Angeles Times ranked Guardian as the ninth most anticipated new ride of 2014; Sarah Sekula from Fox News ranked the ride in the top nine. Jody Robbins from MSN ranked Guardian in the top 11 best new attractions in Canada.

According to Triotech and Cedar Fair, the response from the public during the ride's opening weekend was positive. Children and parents interviewed by Adam Martin-Robbins from Yorkregion.com said they enjoyed the ride. Jeremy Schoolfiiled from the IAAPA said, "Cedar Fair seems to have figured out how to create a lavish dark ride on a regional theme park budget".

During the 2014 season, attendance at Canada's Wonderland dropped one percent—a loss of approximately 36,000 visitors—compared to that of the 2013 season. The park's most recent increase in attendance was in 2012, the season Leviathan debuted, where there was a five percent increase. Wonder Mountain's Guardian did not place in the top 50 roller coasters in the world, nor was it in the top five new roller coasters in the Golden Ticket Awards for the 2014 season.

== See also ==
- Voyage to the Iron Reef
