= Triotech =

Canadian interactive attraction company

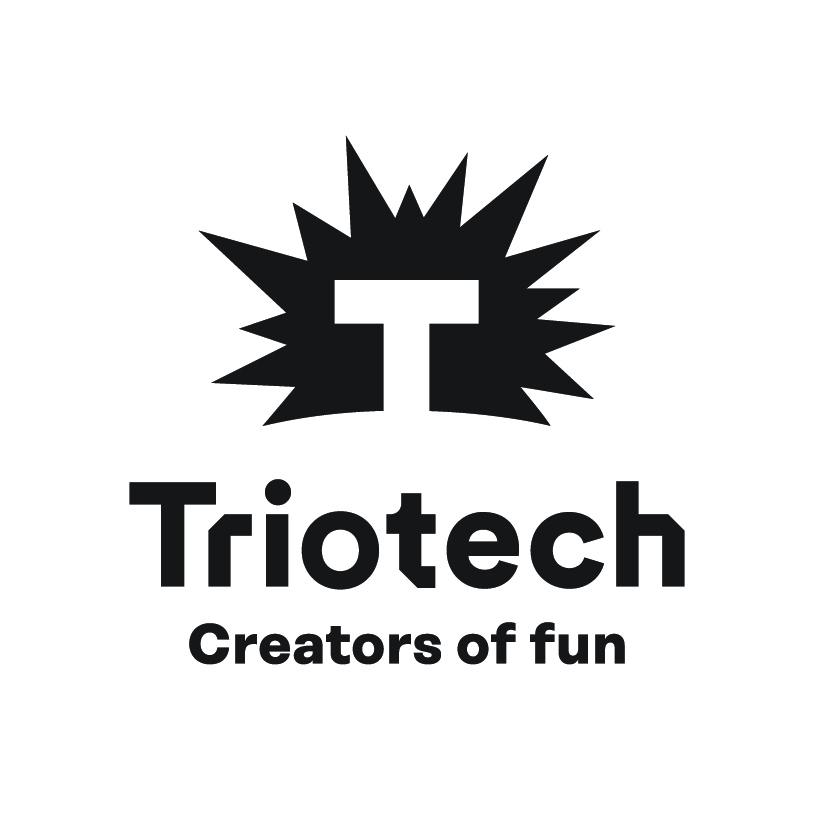
- Company type: Private
- Industry: Motion simulators
- Founded: In Joliette, Canada in 1999; 27 years ago
- Founder: Ernest Yale
- Headquarters: Montreal, Canada
- Number of locations: 3
- Key people: Ernest Yale, Sylvain Larose, Christian Martin, Eric Beauregard
- Products: XD Dark Rides, Interactive Dark Rides, XD Theaters, Typhoon, STORM, Walkthrough, Flying theaters
- Number of employees: 230 (2020)
- Divisions: CL Corporation (France)
- Website: Triotech

Triotech is a manufacturer of out-of-home multi-sensory interactive attractions. Since 2006, TRIOTECH has operated its own studio to develop custom content for its attractions. Founded in 1999, TRIOTECH is a privately held company based in Canada with offices in the US, Europe, and China. with research and development facilities as well as a movie studio in Montreal, Quebec.

They are known for their motion simulators such as XD Theatres and XD Dark Ride interactive theaters.

== Background ==
Triotech designs, develops, and markets immersive and interactive out-of-home cinemas and platforms, as well as small 3-dimensional movie theaters. They distribute their products under XD Theater, XD DarK Ride, Interactive Dark Ride, Flying Theaters, immersive Walkthroughs, and Typhoon.

In 2006, Triotech opened a Montreal-based 3D animation studio to create custom content, to work in conjunction with the parent company's line of theme park motion rides.

In 2019 Triotech announced the acquisition of a French company CL Corp, forming the largest media-based experiences group in the attractions industry.

XD Theater is a 3D film attraction. When first released, XD Theater included the 3D ride films Cosmic Coaster, Haunted Mine and Arctic Run. There are now over 40 3D films in Triotech's XD Theater library. The ultimate immersive ride with real time 3D stereoscopic graphics combined with visual FX for a multi sensory experience, a motion simulated thrill ride that transcends time, space and imagination.

XD Dark Ride is an interactive theater using group play, real-time 3D graphics and individual scoring system to create unique, competitive dynamics. This multi-sensory, interactive attraction, designed for the whole family, won IAAPA's prestigious Brass Ring Award for Best New Product in 2013.

== Products ==
- Interactive Dark Ride (some ride systems have been provided by Zamperla)
- Ghostbusters 5D at Heide Park in Soltau, Germany
- Ninjago The Ride at Legoland Resorts in Legoland California, Legoland Florida, Legoland Deutschland, Legoland Windsor, Legoland Malaysia, Legoland Billund and Legoland New York
- Sholay: The hunt for Gabbar Singh at Dubai Parks and Resorts
- The Flyer – San Francisco at Pier39 in San Francisco, US
- Finding Larva and Larva's Space Adventure (from Larva's TV Series) at Jeju Shinhwa World
- Gan Gun Battlers at Tokyo Dome in Tokyo, Japan
- Wonder Mountain's Guardian at Canada's Wonderland in Vaughan, Ontario
- Knott's Bear-y Tales: Return to the Fair at Knott's Berry Farm in Buena Park, CA
- 7D Experience XD Dark Ride in San Francisco, CA
- Typhoon
- STORM™ interactive multiplayer coin-op simulator
- XD Theatres immersive theaters
- Interactive Cinema
- Over 40 3D animated films
- Wasteland Racers 2071
- UFO Stomper
- Qube
- Jett Rider
- Hyper Ride
- Cyberpod
- Mad Wave Motion Theater
