= Clown Coaster =

Roller coaster at Wicksteed Park in England

Coordinates: 52°22′56″N 0°42′30″W

Clown Coaster is a steel children's roller coaster at Wicksteed Park in Kettering, England. It opened at the park in October 2011, and was manufactured by Pinfari.

== History ==
Clown Coaster originally opened at Harbour Park, where it operated for a single season. It was then relocated to the Beaver Creek section of Pleasure Beach Resort (better known as Blackpool Pleasure Beach) from 1989 to 2008, where it operated first as Nicky's Circus and later as Circus Clown.

The ride was sold to a travelling showman in late 2008, and operated at Adventure Coast Southport in 2009. In April 2011, the ride resurfaced at Wicksteed Park. It had been purchased for £20,000, with an additional £130,000 to be spent on refurbishment before a grand opening during the October half-term break.

== Statistics ==
The track has a simple oval-shaped layout, and contains a few shallow dips. The train was designed to look like a clown. The train consists of four cars, each capable of seating four riders in two rows of two, for a total of 16 riders per train. A full ride experience on Clown Coaster lasts approximately one minute and 40 seconds.
