= Trauma Towers =

Former amusement ride at Pleasure Beach Resort

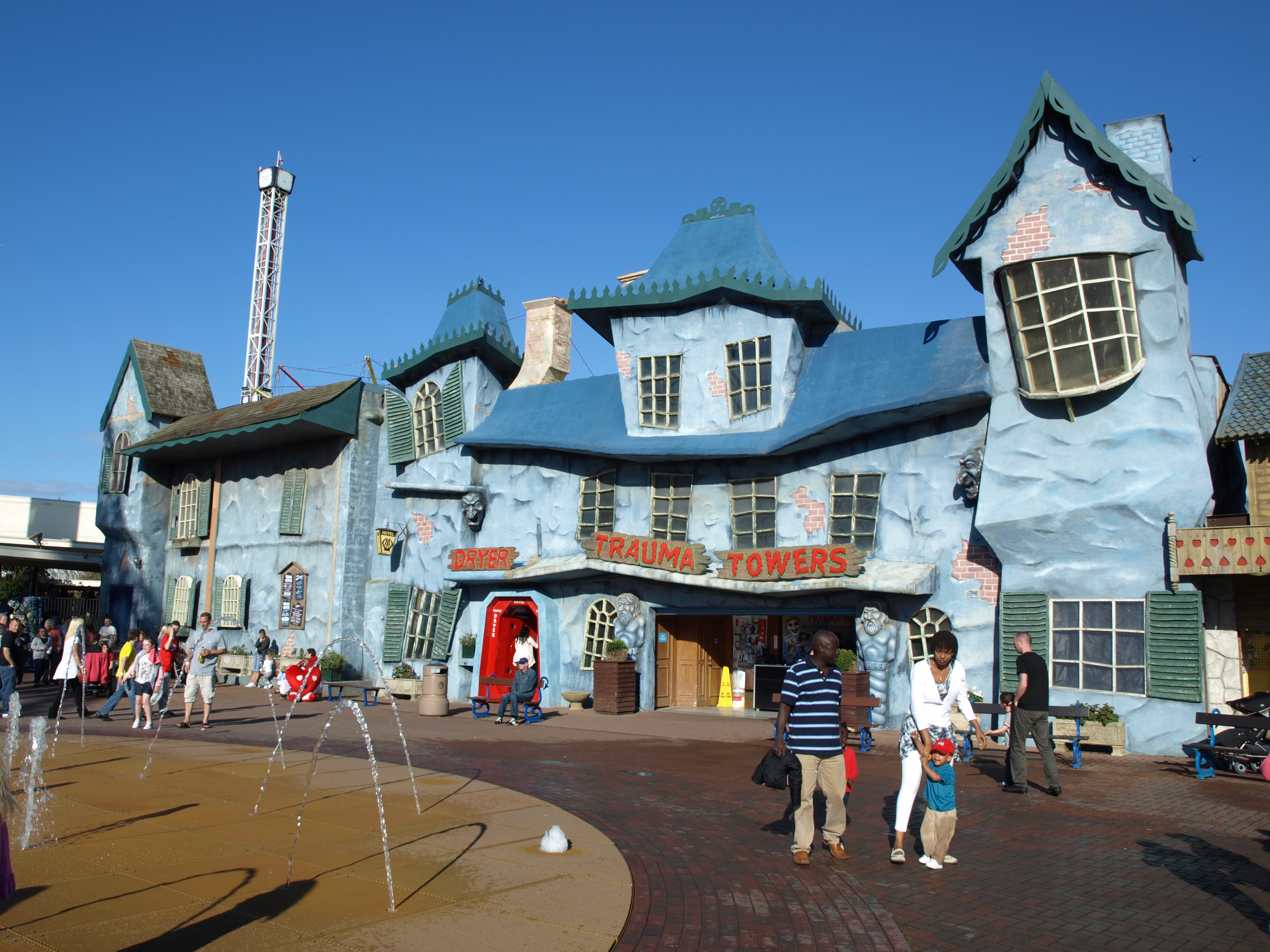
The ride in 2010

Trauma Towers, formerly The Haunted Hotel, was a funhouse haunted attraction at Pleasure Beach Resort (better known as Blackpool Pleasure Beach) in Blackpool, England.

The walk-through attraction opened in 1980, themed to a derelict hotel where visitors are taken through several haunted rooms. In 1999, the attraction was renamed to Trauma Towers, and joined with the neighboring Tagada flat ride, which became the Baronial Dining Hall and served as a finale.

In 2009, the attraction closed, and was left standing but not operating. Some of the scenes from within were reused in the Ghost Train ride. In January 2018, the entire building was demolished at the same time as the Wild Mouse roller coaster, to make way for "future developments".

== Walk-through ==
The attraction was changed several times over its lifetime, with much of the original 1980 design being altered as different scenes were added. The areas guests would walk through during the ride were as follows: lobby, garden room, lounge, dark corridor, crypt, furnace room, staircase, bedroom, games corridor, balcony, dressing room, library, bathroom, organ corridor, and the Baronial Dining Hall. The Baronial Dining Hall contained a Tagada ride.

The Tagada was a Soriani & Moser Tagada which was originally installed in 1987. In 2010, after the ride had closed, travelling showman and attractions fabricator Walter Murphy purchased it and converted it to a travelling ride before selling it to Stewart Robinson, who still owns and operates it, mainly travelling in Yorkshire.
