= Ghost Train (Blackpool Pleasure Beach) =

Dark ride at Pleasure Beach Resort

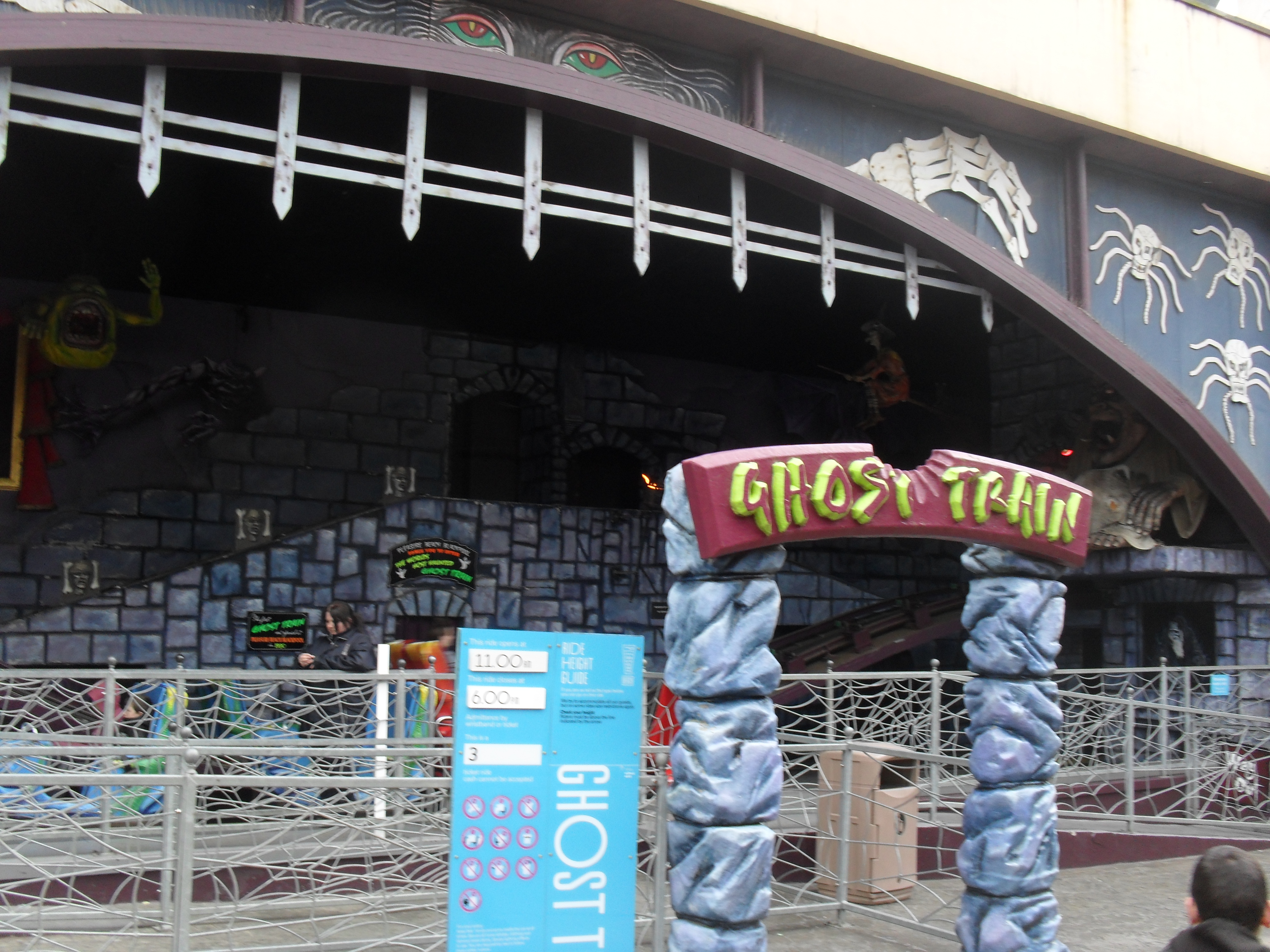

Pleasure Beach Resort
- Status: Operating
- Opening date: 1930

Ride statistics
- Attraction type: Dark ride
- Designer: Joseph Emberton
- Rows: 1
- Riders per row: 2
- Duration: Approximately 4 minutes

Ghost Train is a dark ride attraction at Pleasure Beach Resort (better known as Blackpool Pleasure Beach) in Blackpool, England. It opened in 1930 as a single-floor ride, but was rebuilt and redesigned with a second floor in 1936 by Joseph Emberton. The ride was the first in the world to use the Ghost Train name. It has also undergone several refurbishments throughout its years of operation.

== Design and history ==
In the 1920s, Pretzel rides were beginning to see popularity in the United States. During the late 1920s, Pleasure Beach Resort decided to install one of these types of dark rides. It was to be named Ghost Train, after a popular play at the time, The Ghost Train.

It opened in 1930, and originally featured only a single floor. In 1936, Joseph Emberton refurbished the ride and added a second floor. It again saw changes in 1957, headed by Jack Ratcliff, where it was moved slightly from its original location to accommodate the addition of Wild Mouse. It received haunted castle theming in 1973.

Today, the ride consists mainly of special effects painted with luminescent paint and lit by blacklights. Many scenes in the ride are based on horror stories, characters, and films, such as Dracula and The Exorcist.

The ride has an open station, which is decorated with various props. The ride travels through the first section of scenes before descending a small drop near the station area and pulling up to enter the second section, featuring many more props. After the Trauma Towers ride closed following the 2008 season, some of the scenes from that ride were reused in Ghost Train.

== Music ==
The ride uses the song "Impressions of Sorcerer" by Tangerine Dream during some parts of the ride. The song was originally written for the film Sorcerer, and notably the drum beat and electric guitar sections of the song have been removed for the ride.

== In popular culture ==
In 2004, the ride was featured on an episode of Most Haunted Live!, a paranormal reality television series that performed an investigation at the park.
