= Nickelodeon Land =

Children's amusement section in Pleasure Beach Resort

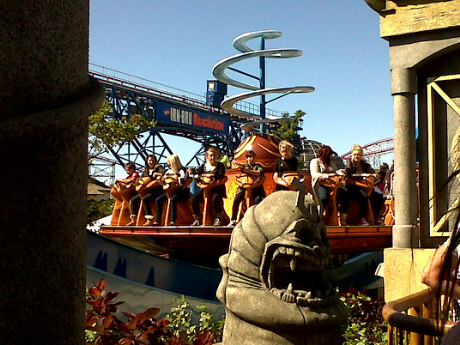
- Avatar Airbender in Nickelodeon Land
- Theme: Nickelodeon
- Area: 42 acres (17 ha)

Attractions
- Total: 13
- Roller coasters: 2
- Water rides: 2
- Other rides: 9

Pleasure Beach Resort
- Coordinates: 53°47′25″N 3°03′20″W
- Opened: 4 May 2011
- Replaced: Beaver Creek

Nickelodeon Land is a themed children's amusement section in Pleasure Beach Resort (better known as Blackpool Pleasure Beach) in Blackpool, England. It opened on 4 May 2011 and replaced Beaver Creek, the former children's section within the park, which closed on 5 September 2010 after Amanda Thompson, manager of the park, announced that the park would be partnering with Nickelodeon to open a new and modern children's section within Pleasure Beach Resort.

== Rides ==
Name	Opened	Description
Avatar Airbender	2011	Zamperla Disk'O
Backyardigan's Pirate Treasure	1999	Mack Rides Sea Storm. Originally named Bradley Beaver's Pirate Ship Ride.
Bikini Bottom Bus Tour	2011	Zamperla Crazy Bus
Blue Flyer	1934	A children's wooden coaster composed of bunny hills and a tunnel. Originally known as Zipper Dipper and renamed to Blue Flyer in 2011. Designed by Charles Paige.
Diego's Rainforest Rescue	2011	Zamperla Balloon Tower
Dora's World Voyage	2011	A miniature boat ride built by W.G.H. Transportation Engineering.
Fairy World Taxi Spin	2011	Zamperla Aero Top Jet
Krusty Krab Order Up	2003	Moser's Rides drop tower. Originally named Fruit Shoot.
Nickelodeon Streak	1933	A wooden coaster. From 1933 to 2011, it was known simply as Roller Coaster. It was rethemed to Nickelodeon Streak in 2011. Designed by Charles Paige.
Paw Patrol Quads	2011	Originally known as Super Quads and Boots Beach Buggies.
Rugrats' Lost River	1992	A one-hill log flume originally named Beaver Creek: The Ride, Chewits Log Chute, and Beaver Creek Log Chute. Built in-house.
SpongeBob's Splash Battle	2011	Mack Rides Twist 'n' Splash
Wonder Pets Big Circus Bounce	2011	Zamperla Jump Around

== See also ==
- Nickelodeon in amusement parks
- 2011 in amusement parks
