= Nickelodeon Streak =

Wooden roller coaster at Pleasure Beach Resort

- Previously known as Roller Coaster (1933–2010)
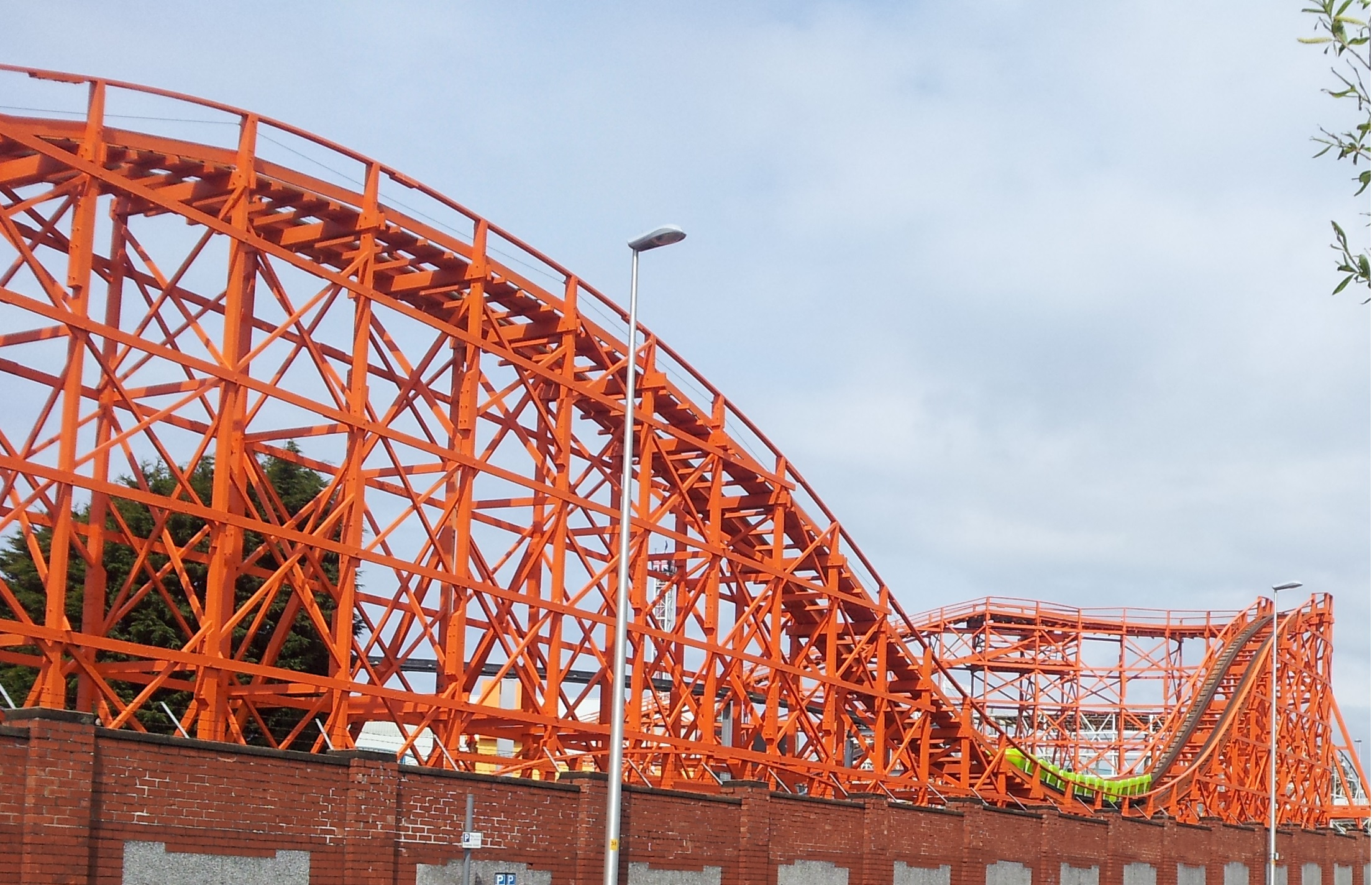
- Train descending the first drop

Pleasure Beach Resort
- Location: Pleasure Beach Resort
- Park section: Nickelodeon Land
- Coordinates: 53.790844°N 3.054395°W
- Status: Operating
- Opening date: 1933

General statistics
- Type: Wood – Out-and-back
- Designer: Charles Paige
- Lift/launch system: Chain
- Height: 61 ft (19 m)
- Length: 2,293 ft (699 m)
- Speed: 35 mph (56 km/h)
- Inversions: 0
- Duration: 1:44
- G-force: 3
- Restraint style: Lap bar (since 2006)
- Height restriction: 46 in (117 cm)
- Trains: Single train with 3 cars; riders arranged 2 across in 4 rows for a total of 24 riders per train
- Nickelodeon Streak at RCDB

Nickelodeon Streak (formerly Roller Coaster) is a wooden out-and-back roller coaster at Pleasure Beach Resort (better known as Blackpool Pleasure Beach) in Blackpool, England. It was built in 1933 by Charles Paige, and utilizes the lift hill and other parts of the former Velvet Coaster, which was retired in 1932. The ride is an ACE Coaster Classic.

== History ==
From 1933 to 2010, the ride was known simply as Roller Coaster. After Nickelodeon Land was announced in 2010, the coaster was renamed and rethemed to Nickelodeon Streak. It is the second-tallest of the four wooden coasters at Pleasure Beach Resort, standing at 19 metres (61 ft) tall. It is 699 metres (2,293 ft) long, and has top speeds of 56 km/h (35 mph). It subjects riders to a maximum of 3 Gs. A full ride experience on Nickelodeon Streak lasts approximately one minute and 44 seconds.

A train from Velvet Coaster was once featured on display in the station of Roller Coaster.

Nickelodeon Streak has a single train with three cars, seating eight riders per car in four rows of two, for a total of 24 riders per train. Until 2005, the train had no proper restraints, featuring only a grab bar. From 2006 onwards, the train has featured lap bars.

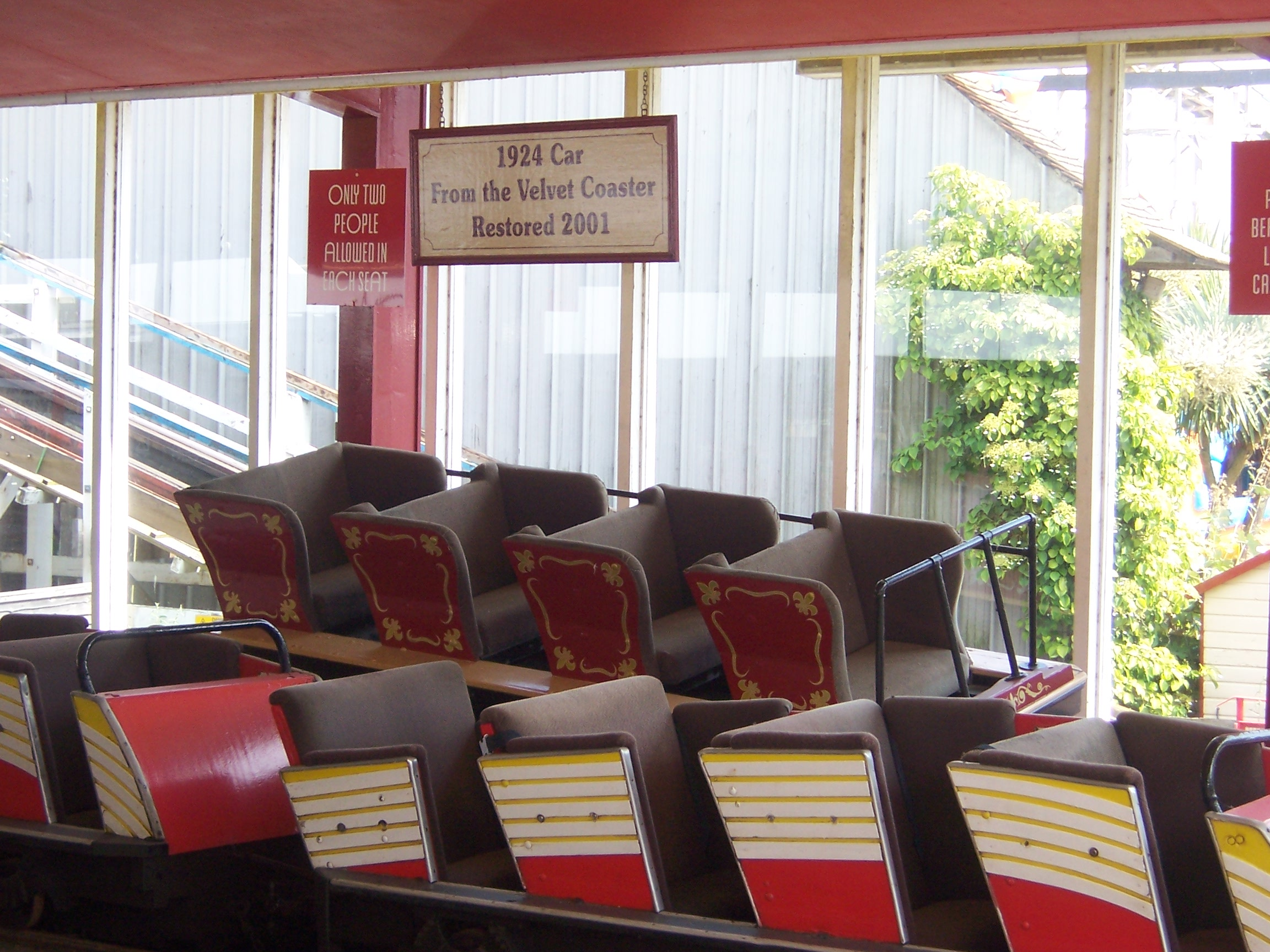
Restored Velvet Coaster car on display in the Roller Coaster station

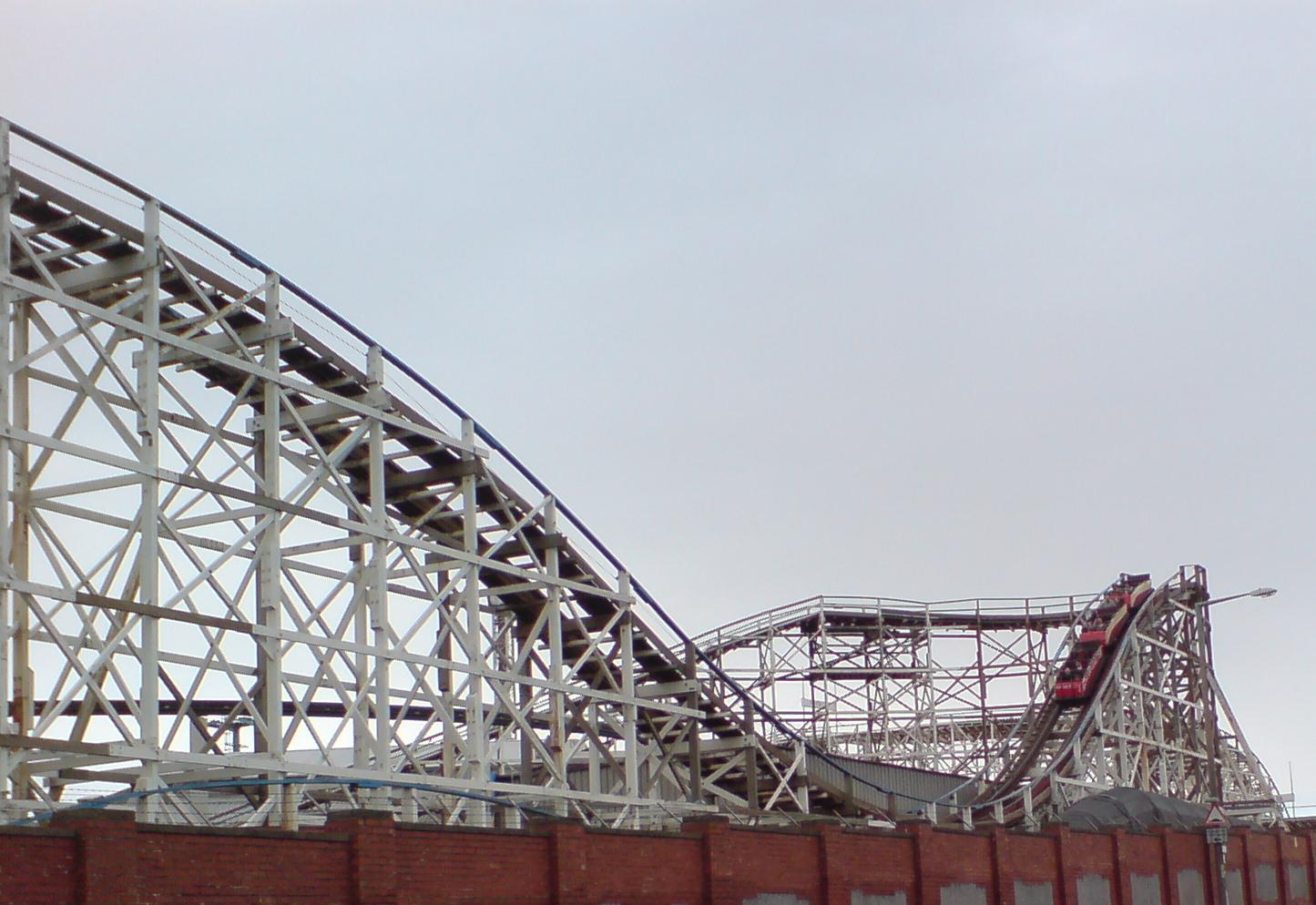
Train descending the first drop in 2008
