= Grand National (roller coaster) =

Wooden roller coaster at Pleasure Beach Resort

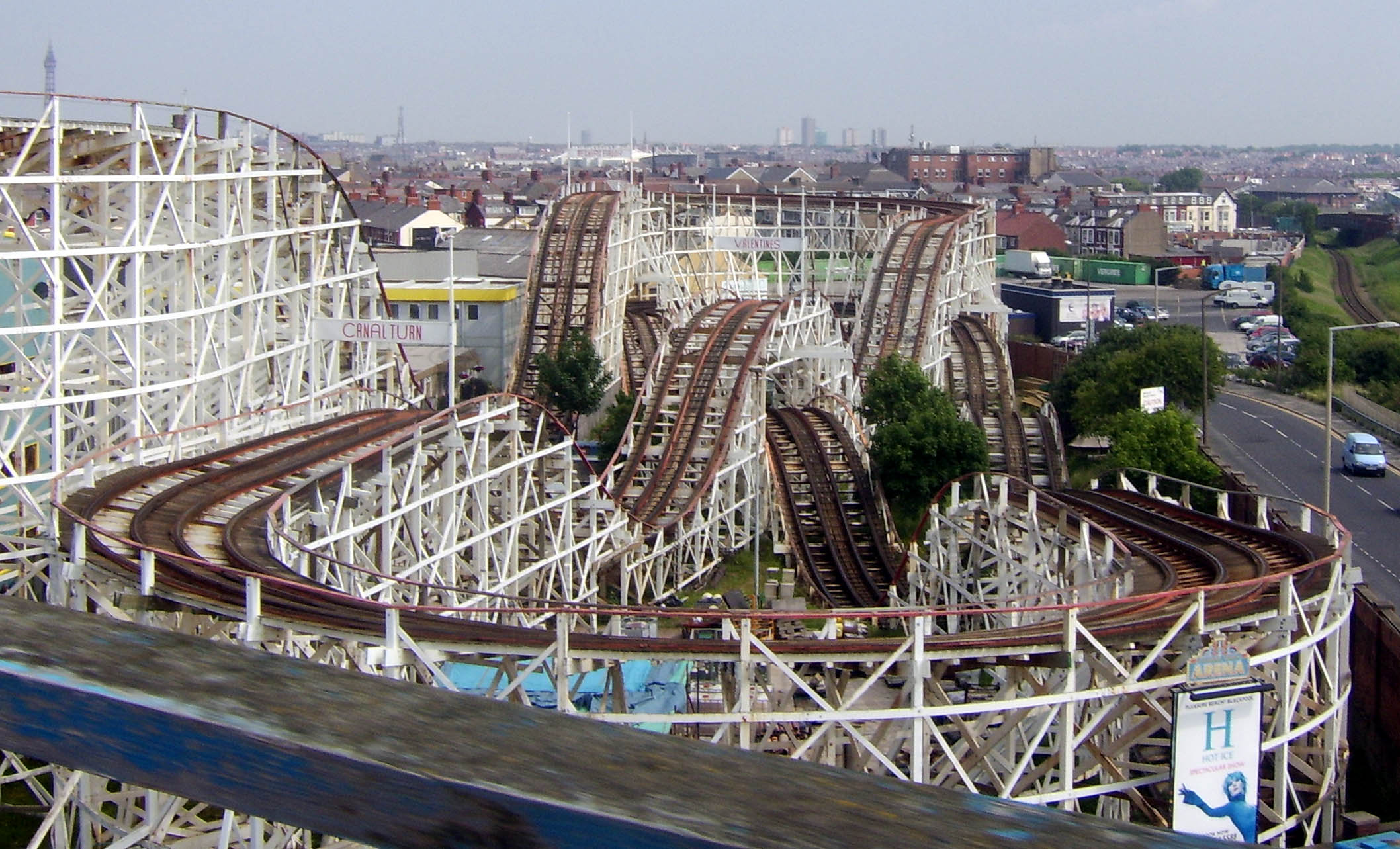
- Grand National

Pleasure Beach Resort
- Location: Pleasure Beach Resort
- Coordinates: 53°47′31″N 3°03′11″W
- Status: Operating
- Opening date: 1935

General statistics
- Type: Wood – Racing
- Designer: Charles Paige
- Model: Racing
- Track layout: Möbius loop
- Lift/launch system: Chain lift
- Height: 62 ft (19 m)
- Length: 3,302 ft (1,006 m)
- Speed: 40 mph (64 km/h)
- Inversions: 0
- Duration: 2:20
- Max vertical angle: 39°
- Height restriction: 55 in (140 cm)
- Trains: 4 trains with 3 cars; riders arranged 2 across in 3 rows for a total of 18 riders per train
- Grand National at RCDB

Grand National is a wooden roller coaster located at Pleasure Beach Resort (better known as Blackpool Pleasure Beach) in Blackpool, England. It was designed and constructed by American engineer Charles Paige in 1935. The ride was designated as a Grade II listed building on 19 April 2017.

The ride is one of only two surviving wooden coasters with a Möbius loop layout (the other being Racer at Kennywood). Additionally, Grand National is the only surviving dual-tracked roller coaster in England in which two cars race against one another.

== History ==
Grand National opened in 1935, having been designed and built by Charles Paige and Harry Traver, whose Cyclone Racer coaster at Queens Park in California inspired the ride. It was a part of a program for new rides being built at the park, and was the main new ride that year. Joseph Emberton designed the original concrete and glass station. After major private sector investments funded a total of £1 million in 1990, the station was completely rebuilt to address repair needs.

Andy Hine, the chairman of the Roller Coaster Club of Great Britain, was married on the ride in the early 1990s. A plaque with his name is installed on one of the trains.

On 2 March 2019, the world record for "most naked riders on a theme park ride" was broken on the ride by 195 people.

== Characteristics ==
Grand National's theme and name come from the Grand National horse race, with elements of the ride designed to mimic features of the Aintree Racecourse, including Becher's Brook and Canal Turn.

The ride stands at 19 meters (62 ft) tall, and each train traverses a track length of 1,006 meters (3,302 ft) throughout its course (making for a total of 2,013 meters (6,604 ft) of track). It reaches top speeds of 64 km/h (40 mph). It has a maximum vertical angle of 39 degrees. A full ride experience on Grand National lasts approximately two minutes and 20 seconds.

The trains were manufactured by Philadelphia Toboggan Coasters, and are coloured blue, red, green and burgundy. Each train features three cars. Each car has three rows seating two riders, for a total of 18 riders per train. Each row has individual lap bars and seatbelts.

== Incidents ==
- On 20 May 2004, an electrical fault in the lighting system of the station roof caused a fire which destroyed the station and parts of two adjacent rides as well as the trains of the ride. Firefighters used water from the nearby Valhalla log flume ride to extinguish the flames. The station was rebuilt and new trains were installed, and the ride reopened on 28 October 2004 after repairs were completed.
- In 2014, 58-year-old Robert Sycamore broke his neck whilst riding. It was later discovered that he had an underlying back condition, making him prone to such an injury. He survived his injuries.

== See also ==
- Listed buildings in Blackpool
