= Ken Webster (hypnotist) =

British hypnotist

- Born: Kenneth George Webster; 1964 (age 61–62); Scarborough, England
- Occupation: Hypnotist
- Years active: 1982–present

Kenneth George Webster (born 1964) is a British hypnotist. He performed at Pleasure Beach Resort (better known as Blackpool Pleasure Beach) in a show called Ken Webster: Mentalist Hypnotist for 35 years, which was the longest-running hypnosis show in the world. He has also appeared on Ant & Dec's Saturday Night Takeaway.

In 2011, Webster was the guest interviewee on an episode of Backstage Blackpool. In 2012, he won a Scarborough-based episode of Come Dine with Me.

In 2025, Webster announced his departure from Pleasure Beach Resort, and a subsequent move to another venue in Blackpool known as Viva Blackpool.
