= Richard De Vere =

British showman

- Born: 18 June 1967; Bolton, England
- Died: 10 March 2014 (aged 46); Thailand
- Occupation: Showman
- Years active: 1992–2014

Richard De Vere (18 June 1967 – 10 March 2014) was a British showman who was best known for 21 consecutive seasons of performances at Pleasure Beach Resort (better known as Blackpool Pleasure Beach).

== Biography ==
De Vere was born on 18 June 1967 in Bolton, and was the grandson of Arthur Holt. De Vere was an illusionist, magician, and showman. He took up magic when at school in Bolton. He told the Blackpool Gazette in 2006, “With a lot of practice it became a skill – making it interesting enough for people to want to watch was as much the skill as performing the trick or illusion.” His showbusiness mentor, the comedian Bernie Winters, bequeathed to him his St. Bernard, Schnorbitz.

De Vere died at the age of 46 whilst on holiday in Thailand on 10 March 2014. He died after contracting pneumonia and suffering a heart attack.

== Career ==
=== Pantomimes ===
De Vere played his first pantomime villain in Liverpool at the Empire Theatre in 1989 with American television personality Mr. T. De Vere was a veteran pantomime villain who made several appearances at Liverpool's Royal Court Theatre, along with Schnorbitz. He was also a regular pantomime villain at St. Helen's Theatre Royal throughout the 2000s with vocalist Marc Lawlor.

=== Mystique (Early 1990s–2008) ===
Mystique was a long-running illusion show at Pleasure Beach Resort. De Vere was the centre stage headliner for much of the proceedings, and performed many illusions and tricks. Various glamorous attendants popped in and out of claustrophobic boxes throughout the show as well.

=== Beyond Belief (2008–2013) ===
De Vere starred in his own show, Beyond Belief, from 2008 until 2013 in the Horseshoe Bar at Pleasure Beach Resort. The show was written and produced by De Vere himself, featuring vocalist Marc Lawlor, dancers, Schnorbitz, and iCloud the cat.

== Honours ==
In 1997, a statue of De Vere was unveiled on a plinth outside the main entrance of Pleasure Beach Resort. The statue was made of bronze and was a life-size rendition of the performer, along with Schnorbitz. The statue is no longer located in its original position and its whereabouts are currently unknown.
