= Mystique (Blackpool Pleasure Beach) =

Illusion show at Blackpool Pleasure Beach

Mystique was a long running illusion show at Pleasure Beach Resort (better known as Blackpool Pleasure Beach) featuring many different types of illusions, comedy, and dance.

The show was introduced in the early 1990s and ran until 2008. It featured illusionist Richard De Vere and his canine companion Schnorbitz.
