= Beaver Creek (Blackpool Pleasure Beach) =

Former children's amusement section in Pleasure Beach Resort

- Interactive map of Beaver Creek
- Area: 42 acres (17 ha)

Attractions
- Total: 10
- Roller coasters: 1
- Water rides: 1
- Other rides: 8

Pleasure Beach Blackpool
- Coordinates: 53°47′25″N 3°03′20″W
- Opened: 1992
- Closed: 5 September 2010
- Replaced: Funshineland
- Replaced by: Nickelodeon Land

Beaver Creek was a children's amusement section in Pleasure Beach Resort (better known as Blackpool Pleasure Beach). It initially opened in 1992, replacing the former children's section, Funshineland. It closed on 5 September 2010 when managing director Amanda Thompson announced that it would be replaced by Nickelodeon Land. Nickelodeon Land opened in Beaver Creek's place on 5 May 2011.

Many of the rides that were originally part of Beaver Creek were rethemed and continued to operate in Nickelodeon Land, or moved to a different part of the park.

== Former rides ==
Name	Operated	Description
Helicopters	1960–2010	Children's spinning ride. Sold to Adventure Coast Southport following the 2010 season, where it reopened in 2011. It operated there until 2014, when it was removed.
Veteran Carousel	1977–2024	A miniature carousel built by H.P. Jackson. Relocated under Avalanche's lift hill following the closure of Beaver Creek. Initially renamed to Vintage Carousel, and later renamed to Thompson Carousel. Closed following the 2024 season.
Lunar Carousel	1981–2010	A miniature space-themed carousel built by H.P. Jackson.
Magic Mountain	1932–2010	Children's fantasy-themed dark ride. Built in-house. Originally known as Grotto La Paz and The Fairy Grotto.
Magnus' Mini Dodgems	1977–2010	Children's bumper cars built by Sartori. Originally opened as Mini Autoskooters.
Bradley Beaver's Pirate Ship Ride	1999–present	Mack Rides Sea Storm. Rethemed as Backyardigan's Pirate Treasure for Nickelodeon Land.
Tetley Tea Cup Ride	1962–2016	Philadelphia Toboggan Coasters teacups ride. Relocated within the park for the 2011 season, and renamed to Crazy Daisy. Removed following the 2016 season.
Beaver Creek Log Flume	1992–present	A miniature log flume. Rethemed as Rugrats' Lost River for Nickelodeon Land. Built in-house.
Thor's Turnpike	1961–2024	A children's automobile track ride built by Ihle. Relocated within the park for the 2011 season and renamed to Alpine Rallye. Closed following the 2024 season.
Zipper Dipper	1934–present	A children's wooden coaster composed of bunny hills and a tunnel. Rethemed as Blue Flyer for Nickelodeon Land. Built by Charles Paige.
