= Blackpool Pleasure Beach =

Amusement park in England

Pleasure Beach Resort
- Interactive map of Pleasure Beach Resort
- Location: South Shore, Blackpool, Lancashire, England
- Coordinates: 53°47′25″N 3°03′20″W
- Status: Operating
- Opened: 1896
- Owner: Thompson family
- Slogan: "We create the fun. You keep the memories."
- Operating season: March–November
- Area: 42 acres (17 ha)

Attractions
- Total: 31
- Roller coasters: 10
- Water rides: 5
- Website: Pleasure Beach Resort

Pleasure Beach Resort, best known by its former name Blackpool Pleasure Beach, is an amusement park situated on Blackpool's South Shore, in the county of Lancashire, North West England. The park was founded in 1896 by A. W. G. Bean and his partner John Outhwaite. The current managing director is Amanda Thompson.

The park is host to many records, including the largest collection of wooden roller coasters of any park in the United Kingdom with four: Big Dipper, Blue Flyer, Grand National, and Nickelodeon Streak. Many of the roller coasters in the park are record-breaking attractions. When The Big One opened in 1994, it was the tallest and steepest roller coaster in the world. The ride holds the record as the second-tallest and second-fastest roller coaster in the United Kingdom, and the longest roller coaster in Europe.

The park was the first in Europe to introduce an inverting steel coaster, Revolution, and operates the last Steeplechase roller coaster in existence. In addition, Grand National is one of only two wooden Möbius loop coasters still operating, and Sir Hiram Maxim's Captive Flying Machine is the oldest amusement ride in Europe, having opened in 1904. Valhalla, the park's log flume, was one of the largest and most expensive indoor dark rides in the world. The park also operates Nickelodeon Land, a themed children's section.

== History ==
=== Early years (1896–1930) ===
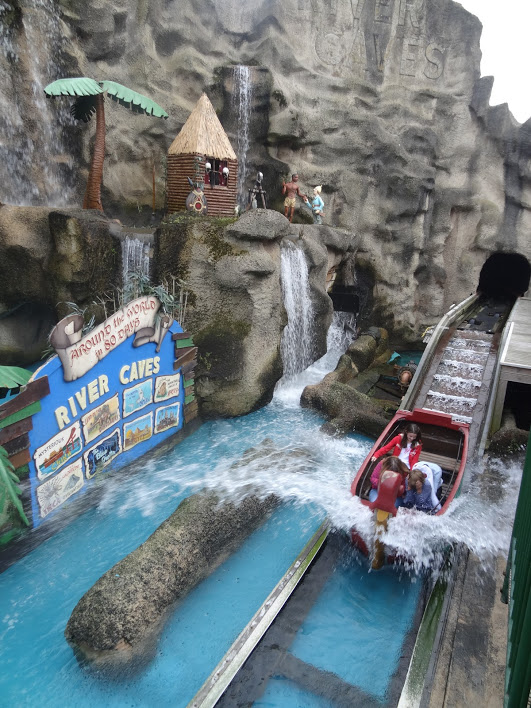
River Caves

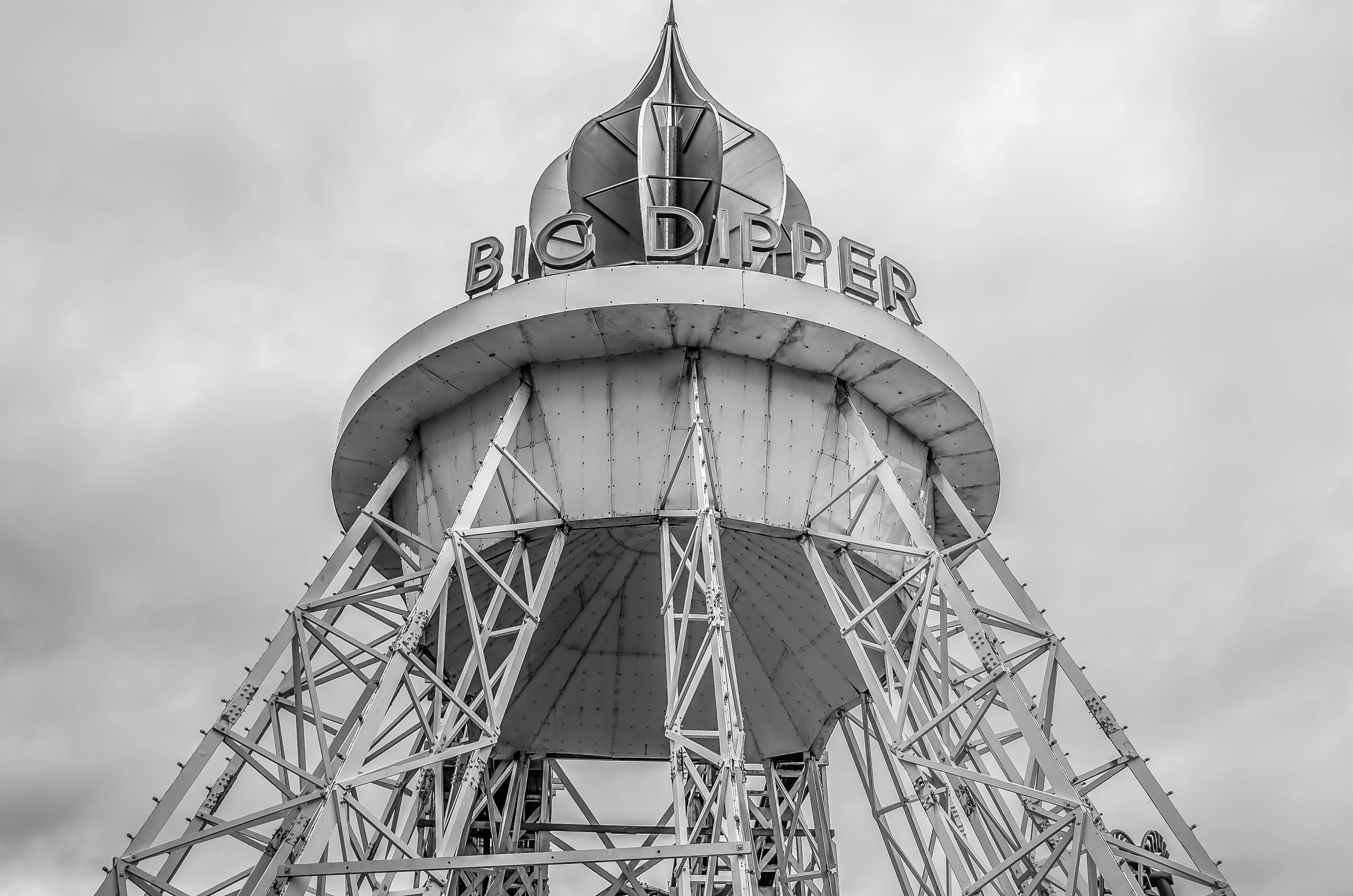
Big Dipper

Pleasure Beach was founded in 1896 by Alderman William George Bean after he failed in his attempt to become an advertising man on New York City's Madison Avenue. He returned to the United Kingdom in 1897 and opened two separate amusement parks: one adjacent to Euston Road in Great Yarmouth, and another in Blackpool, opposite the tram terminus. The Great Yarmouth amusement park failed to generate much interest, so Bean moved to Blackpool full-time towards the end of the 1890s. The Switchback roller coaster, which was built in 1891, predated the park. The park was built around it.

In 1903, Bean, along with local businessman John Outhwaite, purchased 30 acres of land known as the "Watson Estate", which was used to expand the amusement park. The original Pleasure Beach was built on the sand dunes along the promenade and consisted of a few roundabouts, a bicycle railway, and several Gypsy stalls. Bean and Outhwaite decided to grow the business after visiting Coney Island in the United States. Using a small static fairground in London's Earls Court for inspiration, Bean added more rides and sideshows to the park, which began to garner the attention of holidaymakers. Bean's aim was to establish a fun park of a relative size that would "make adults feel like children again and inspire gaiety of a primarily innocent character".

The first notable attraction to open at Pleasure Beach was Sir Hiram Maxim's Captive Flying Machine in 1904. It is a rotary swing ride designed by the British inventor of the same name. A mill chute water ride followed in 1905, which opened under the name The River Caves of the World. Both of these rides are still operational today. In 1907, the park opened its second wooden roller coaster, which was known as Scenic Railway. It was during this time that the park began to be known as Blackpool Pleasure Beach. In 1909, Bean expanded the business by purchasing a second amusement park up the coast in Morecambe under the name West End Amusement Park, which would later become Frontierland Western Theme Park. The success of the Morecambe park led to a third amusement park opening four years later in Southport, under the name Pleasureland Southport.

Meanwhile, Pleasure Beach was developed with frequent large scale investments, including Velvet Coaster, House of Nonsense, Joy Wheel, and The Whip. Outhwaite died in 1911, leaving most of the remaining business to Bean; the Outhwaite family still obtained shares in the park and would occasionally have input into its growth. Following the first World War, investment at the park ceased due to the difficulty in exporting rides from the United States, and the next investments would not be until 1922 when Virginia Reel and Noah's Ark opened. Despite the lack of investment, profits soared, and the company was noted as being one of the most prolific employers in the northwest of England.

Further into the 1920s, Bean invested in the Casino Building. Opened in 1913, it was designed by local architect Robert Butcher Mather, and themed to an Indian palace. In 1938, it was demolished and replaced with a more modern Art Deco-style building, designed by architect Joseph Emberton. Today, the Casino Building features a number of function rooms and offices, and the ground floor space is used as the main ticket centre.

In 1923, land was reclaimed from the Blackpool seafront, and it was during this period that Pleasure Beach moved to its current 42-acre (17 ha) location along the promenade. The same year, Bean brought in John A. Miller to design and build Big Dipper, an out-and-back wooden coaster. Shortly afterwards, a boating pool was built for boat rides. This was Bean's final investment before he died of pneumonia in 1929, having spent 33 years shaping and developing the park. Following his death, his daughter Lillian-Doris inherited the Pleasure Beach business.

Lillian-Doris Bean married Leonard Thompson, a businessman, in 1928. They initially lived in London. However, after Bean's death, the couple returned to Blackpool, where decisions regarding the future running of Pleasure Beach were in discussion. Up until that point, Leonard had not had any active involvement with the park, but in a mutual agreement with his wife, it was agreed that Thompson would take over the park and have full responsibility for all its affairs. His first move was to appoint Oscar Haworth as the general manager and George Palmer as chairman of the company. Over the next two years, Thompson worked with the Outhwaites to expand the business further, starting with the construction of Ghost Train, which opened in 1930.

=== Golden years (1931–2004) ===
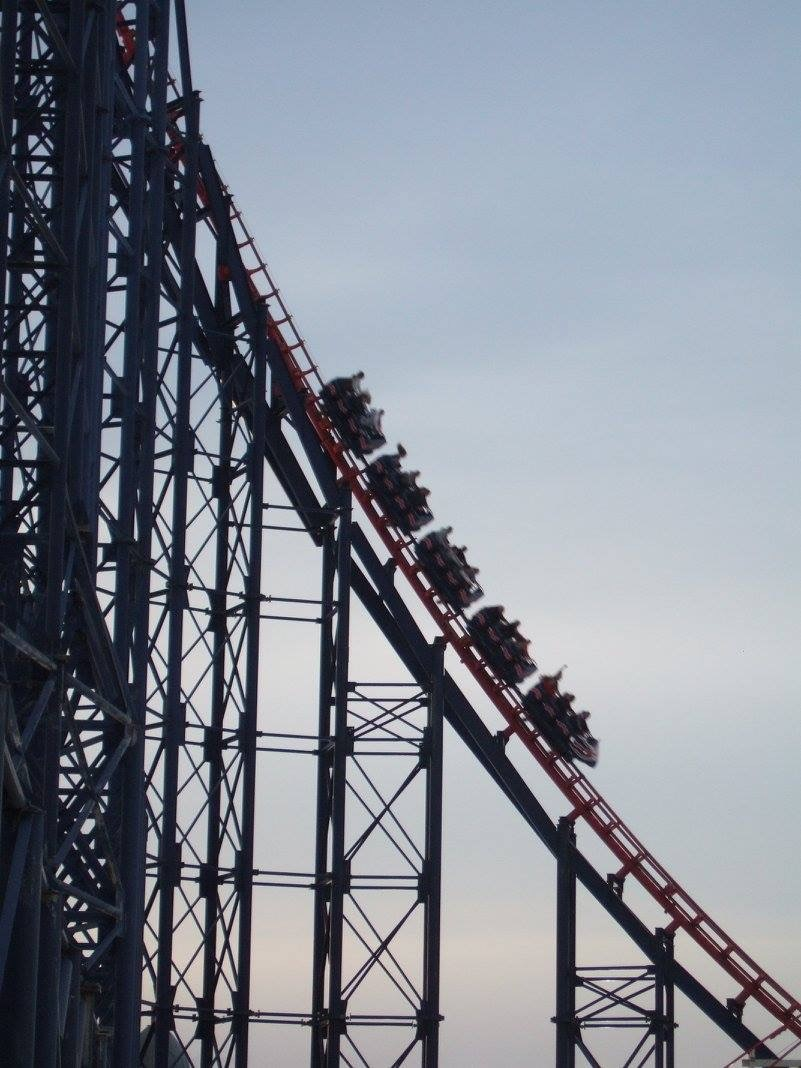
The Big One

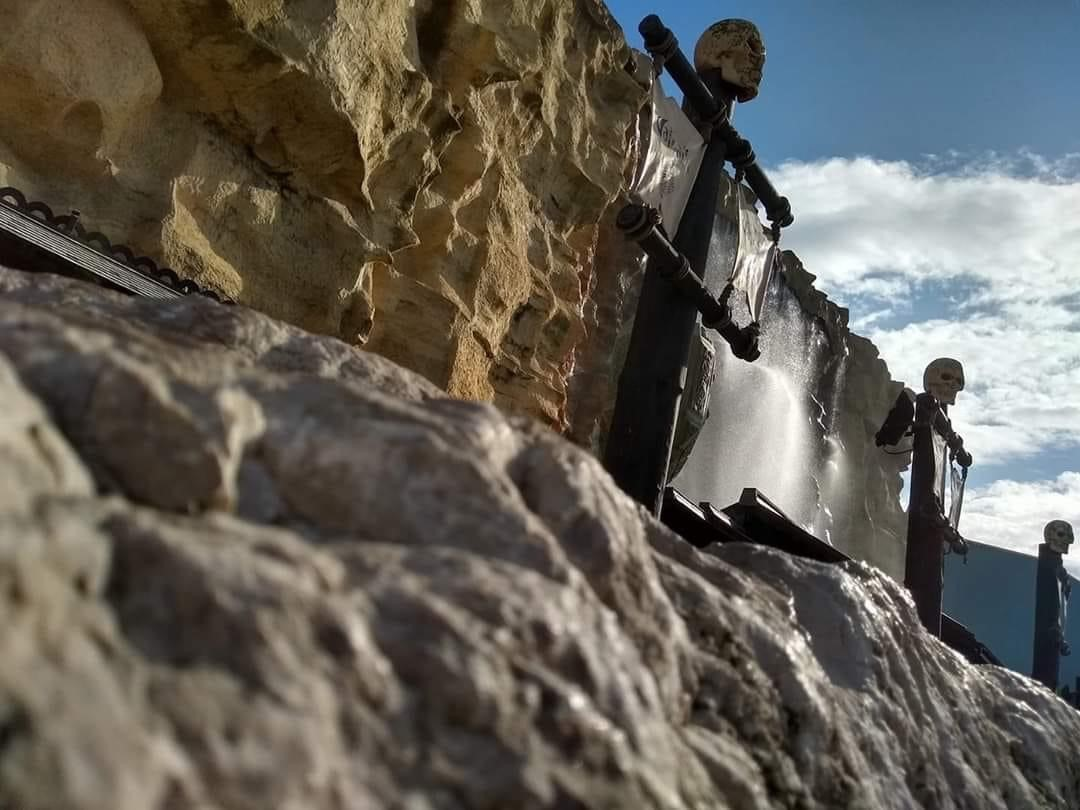
Valhalla

In 1931, the Outhwaite family sold their share of the park to the Thompsons, giving them complete control and ownership of the business. The following year, Watson Road was built alongside the park, which resulted in the closure of Velvet Coaster. Velvet Coaster's structure was reused in the construction of Roller Coaster, which opened in 1933 and was designed by Charles Paige. Thompson's next major investment was the construction of Fun House in 1934, and Grand National in 1935, a wooden coaster designed by Charles Paige.

The success of Paige's wooden coasters resulted in an extension of Big Dipper in 1936, which was lengthened towards the south-westerly side of the park. During this time, Thompson hired Joseph Emberton for the park. He worked on the Casino Building, Noah's Ark and the Ice Drome, a 2,000-seat ice rink. Emberton continued to design for Pleasure Beach up until his death in 1956. Jack Ratcliffe, who had been involved in the Festival of Britain, was brought in to continue the work Emberton did.

Investments steadily decreased during the second World War; however, the park remained open throughout the war. The park returned to prominence in 1958 with the debut of Wild Mouse, the first new ride since World War II. In the following years, Derby Racer and Alice in Wonderland opened. The scale of investments increased into the 1960s, with a log flume opening in 1967 and The Gold Mine opening four years later. After many successful years as the managing director of Pleasure Beach, Leonard Thompson died in 1976, having run the business for 47 years. Following Thompson's death, Doris Thompson was appointed chairman of the business. Their only son, Geoffrey Thompson, inherited his father's role, and became the new managing director.

Geoffrey Thompson returned to the family business as head of catering at the Casino Building. He married his wife Barbara in 1962 and had three children: Amanda, Nicholas and Fiona. He hired Keith Ingham to make extensive alterations to the Casino Building, which was reimagined as the Wonderful World Building (though it has since reverted to its original name of the Casino Building). Thompson's years of management saw the opening of Steeplechase, Avalanche, Revolution and Launch Pad. His most notable investments include The Big One, which opened in 1994 as the tallest roller coaster in the world, and Valhalla, which opened in 2000.

In 1986, Blackpool Pleasure Beach Limited became one of the first companies in the United Kingdom to register with the Government Profit Related Pay Unit. Under this scheme, the company agreed that, where profits exceeded £1 million, 10 per cent would be distributed among the permanent staff according to their length of service.

In 2000, a recreation of Pleasure Beach appeared in the theme park management video game RollerCoaster Tycoon as part of the "Loopy Landscapes" expansion.

Thompson often found himself in dispute with the Blackpool Council over their decision to allow private traders to operate on land opposite the park. Further investments followed at Pleasure Beach, including Spin Doctor in 2002, Big Blue Hotel in 2003, and Bling in 2004. Geoffrey Thompson died of a heart attack at the park on 12 June 2004 while attending a party to celebrate his daughter's wedding. Doris Thompson died nine days later, on 23 June, the date of her son's funeral.

=== Later years (2004–present) ===
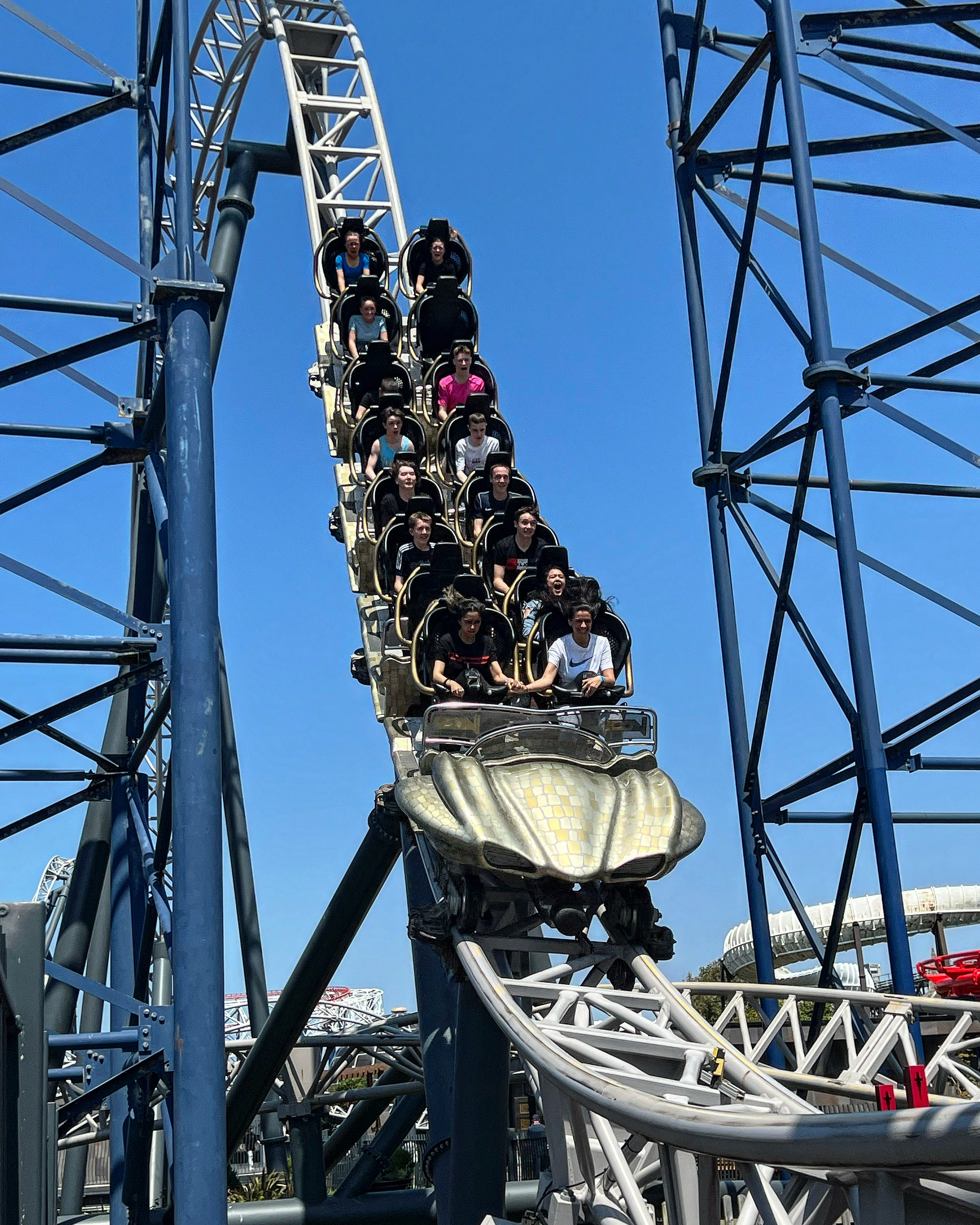
Icon

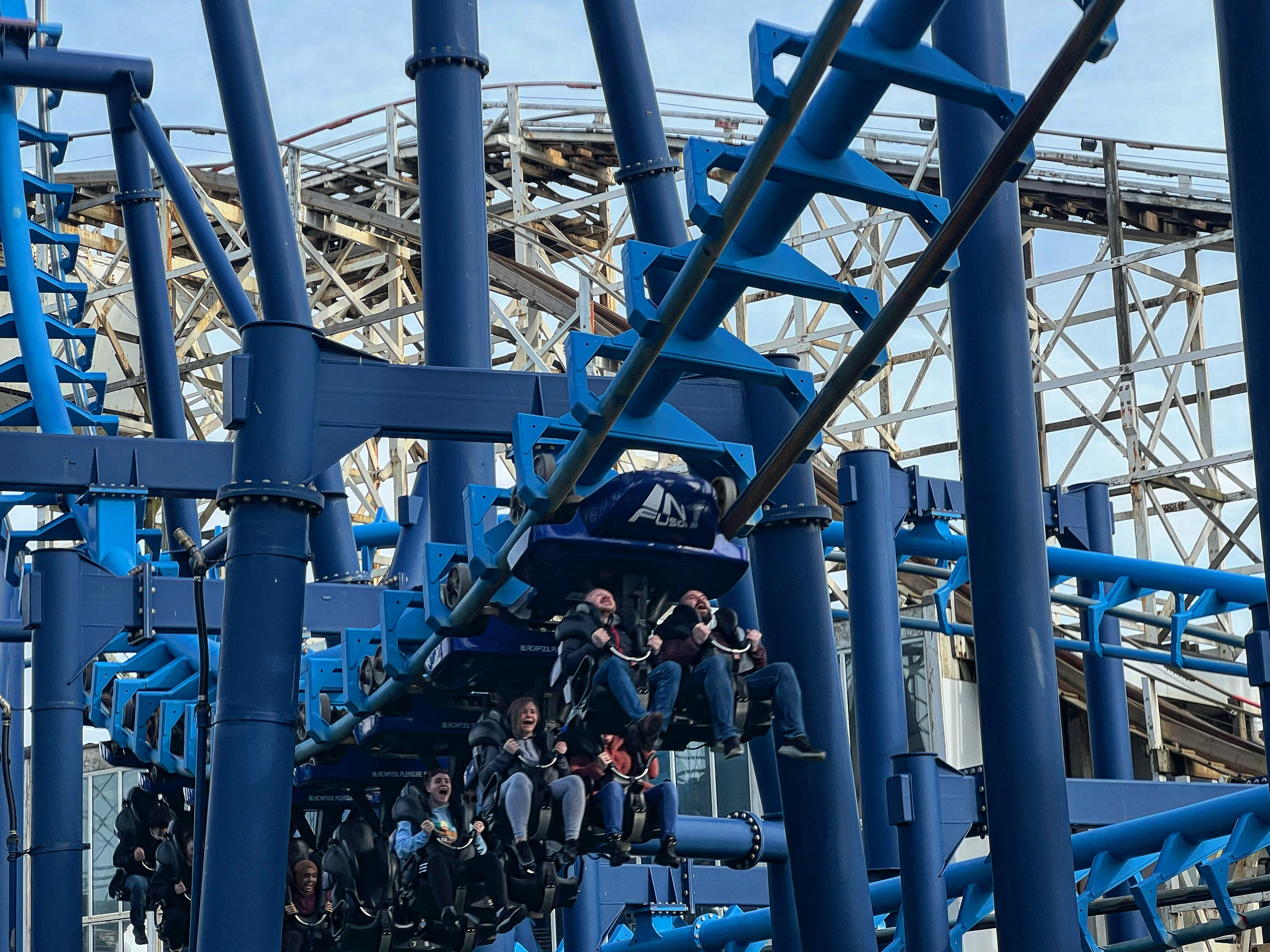
Infusion

Amanda Thompson, Geoffrey's eldest daughter and director of the park for over 15 years, took over the Pleasure Beach business in 2004 following her father's death. Her brother, Nicholas Thompson, became the deputy managing director, and her sister, Fiona Giljé, became the senior company director. During Amanda's years of ownership, the park has seen vast redevelopment, including the removal of numerous rides such as The Whip, Space Invader 2, Turtle Chase, Spin Doctor, Trauma Towers, Noah's Ark, Black Hole, Bling, Wild Mouse and Super Bowl. In 2006, the family closed Pleasureland Southport, had not turned a profit for several years. This move coincided with the closure of Pleasure Beach's log flume Drench Falls and the introduction of Infusion, the park's first new roller coaster in 13 years. Infusion was relocated from Adventure Coast Southport, where it had previously operated under the name of Traumatizer since 1999, and was built on the site of Drench Falls.

In 2011, the Thompson family signed a contract with Viacom, owners of Nickelodeon, to open Nickelodeon Land, a 4-acre children's area situated within the main park. Nickelodeon Land was a £10 million redevelopment of the park's previous children's area, Beaver Creek, which closed in 2010. Many rides were relocated within the park or rethemed in order to accommodate the new area.

In 2013, the park worked alongside Aardman Animations, owners of the Wallace & Gromit franchise, to introduce Wallace & Gromit's Thrill-O-Matic, a dark ride which was a refurbishment of The Gold Mine. In 2015, the park partnered with the Royal Air Force to open Red Arrows Sky Force, a Gerstlauer Sky Fly ride themed to the air acrobatic team. The ride was the first of its kind in the United Kingdom. The latest record is taken by Icon, a multi-launch coaster manufactured by Mack Rides in Germany.

In 2018 the park installed Icon, a £16.25 million multi-launch coaster built by Mack Rides, and the first roller coaster to be built at the park in over a decade. In 2019, a second hotel called Boulevard Hotel was built on the site of the former Star Pub. In February 2024, the park rebranded from Blackpool Pleasure Beach to Pleasure Beach Resort.

On 6 March 2024, The Big One lost its title as the United Kingdom's tallest roller coaster after 30 years, with the completion of Hyperia at Thorpe Park.

In 2025, the park confirmed a number of rides would not reopen for the season, including Red Arrows Sky Force, Gallopers, Thompson Carousel, and Alpine Rallye. That same year, Ice Blast, which temporarily closed in 2023, was rethemed and reopened as Launch Pad. The park also entered a partnership with Coca-Cola to become its new soft drink partner, ending a previous partnership with PepsiCo and Britvic that had been in place since 1994.

A 42 metre (138 ft) Gyro Swing was announced to be added to the park for the 2026 season.

=== Managing directors ===
Decade
1890	1900	1910	1920	1930	1940	1950	1960	1970	1980	1990	2000	2010	2020
John Outhwaite; 1896–1911 · 16 seasons													
William Bean; 1896–1928 · 33 seasons													
				Leonard Thompson; 1929–1976 · 48 seasons									
				Doris Thompson; 1929–2004 · 76 seasons									
								Geoffrey Thompson; 1976–2004 · 29 seasons					
											Amanda Thompson; 2004–current · 23 seasons		
											Nicholas Thompson; 2004–current · 23 seasons		

== Operating rides ==
– Ride located in Nickelodeon Land

=== Roller coasters ===
	Ride	Manufacturer	Type	Opened
	Avalanche	Mack Rides	Bobsled	1988
A steel bobsled roller coaster. It was the first and only bobsled roller coaster to be built in the United Kingdom.
Big Dipper	Big Dipper	John A. Miller & Charles Paige	Wooden	1923
Big Dipper	A wooden roller coaster which was built in 1923 by John Miller and extended in 1936 by Charles Paige and Joe Emberton.			
The Big One	The Big One	Arrow Dynamics	Steel	1994
The Big One	A steel hypercoaster with a height of 65 metres (213 ft). It reaches speeds of up to 119 km/h (74 mph). It was the tallest and steepest roller coaster in the world upon its opening in 1994 until 1996. It was previously sponsored by Pepsi Max, at which point it was known as Pepsi Max Big One.			
	Blue Flyer	Philadelphia Toboggan Coasters	Wooden	1934
A children's wooden coaster composed of bunny hills. A tunnel was added to the layout in 1984. Originally known as Zipper Dipper, and renamed to Blue Flyer in 2011 to coincide with the opening of Nickelodeon Land. It was previously sponsored by Warburtons, and was known as Warburtons Milk Roll-A-Coaster during that time.
Grand National	Grand National	Charles Paige	Wooden	1935
Grand National	A wooden dual-track racing roller coaster. It is themed to the Grand National horse race, and is one of only five Möbius loop roller coasters still in existence.			
	Icon	Mack Rides	Launched	2018
A multi-launch steel coaster built by Mack Rides. Icon is 27 metres (88 ft) tall, reaches speeds of up to 85 km/h (52.8 mph) along 1,140 metres (3,750 ft) of track, and features two launches and a single inversion. It also features a spinning car in the back row, which can be ridden for an extra fee.
	Infusion	Vekoma	Suspended Looping Coaster	2007
A steel inverted roller coaster suspended over water. It originally opened at Adventure Coast Southport in 1999 as Traumatizer.
	Nickelodeon Streak	Charles Paige	Wooden	1933
A wooden coaster. From 1933 to 2010, it was known simply as Roller Coaster. In 2011, it was renamed Nickelodeon Streak to coincide with the addition of Nickelodeon Land. It reused the lift hill from Velvet Coaster, which was built in 1909 and closed in 1932.
	Revolution	Arrow Huss	Launched shuttle	1979
A steel shuttle roller coaster that launches from an elevated station into a loop, before stopping and doing the same backwards.
	Steeplechase	Arrow Huss	Steeplechase	1977
A three-tracked steel racing roller coaster, and the last of its kind in existence.

=== Thrill rides ===
	Ride	Manufacturer	Type	Opened
	Avatar Airbender	Zamperla	Mega Disk'O	2011
A spinning ride themed to Avatar: The Last Airbender.
Launch Pad	Launch Pad	S&S Power	Freefall Shot Tower	1997
Launch Pad	55 metre (180 ft) tall drop tower. Originally opened as PlayStation: The Ride, then later renamed to Tango Ice Blast and Ice Blast: The Ride with a new sponsorship. The ride remained closed in 2024 and reopened in 2025 with refurbishments and a new theme.			
Aviktas	Aviktas	Intamin	Gyro Swing	2026
Aviktas	A 42 metre (138 ft) Gyro Swing that opened in May 2026.			

=== Water rides ===
Ride	Manufacturer	Type	Opened
Dora's World Voyage	W.G.H. Transportation Engineering	Scenic boat ride	2011
A miniature boat ride located in Nickelodeon Land. Replaced Magic Mountain. Themed to Dora the Explorer.
River Caves	Lot Morgan	Old Mill	1905
Classic old mill dark ride, visiting displays "around the world". Closed for maintenance in 2024 onwards.
Rugrats' Lost River	Built in-house	Log flume	1992
A one-hill log flume originally named Beaver Creek: The Ride, Chewits Log Chute, and Beaver Creek Log Chute. Built in-house. Themed to Rugrats.
SpongeBob's Splash Battle	Mack Rides	Twist 'n' Splash	2011
The only ride of its type in the United Kingdom, with rider controlled water cannons, which are used whilst riders sit in vehicles that spin. Themed to SpongeBob SquarePants.
Valhalla	Intamin	Log flume	2000
Enclosed Viking-themed water ride, laden with special effects.

=== Family rides ===
	Ride	Manufacturer	Type	Opened
	Alice in Wonderland	Arrow Development	Dark ride	1962
Children's dark ride featuring scenes from Alice's Adventures in Wonderland and Through the Looking-Glass. The cars are themed to Cheshire Cats.
	Derby Racer	Built in-house	Racing carousel	1959
One of only three of its kind in the world (the others being at Cedar Point and Playland), the ride is a carousel with 56 horses in four rows, which race each other throughout the ride.
	Sir Hiram Maxim's Captive Flying Machine	Hiram Maxim	Flying Machine	1904
A spinning ride, and the oldest operating attraction in the park.
	Ghost Train	Pretzel Amusement Ride Company	Dark ride	1930
A dark ride. This ghost train was the first in the world to hold such a name. It saw additions by Joseph Emberton.
Maroon coloured miniature locomotive sits in the station	Pleasure Beach Express	Charles Paige & Joseph Emberton	Ridable miniature railway	1934
Maroon coloured miniature locomotive sits in the station	A miniature railway featuring scenes from wildlife in a jungle to dinosaurs from the Jurassic and Cretaceous eras.			
	Wallace & Gromit's Thrill-O-Matic	Arrow Huss & W.G.H. Transportation Engineering	Dark ride	1971/2013
Arrow Huss dark ride that originally opened as The Gold Mine in 1971. It was refurbished in 2013 to feature scenes from the animated Wallace & Gromit series, whilst retaining the track layout from The Gold Mine.

=== Other attractions ===
Ride	Manufacturer	Type	Opened
Backyardigan's Pirate Treasure	Mack Rides	Sea Storm	1999
Children's spinning ride. Originally known as Bradley Beaver's Pirate Ship Ride. Themed to The Backyardigans.
Bikini Bottom Bus Tour	Zamperla	Crazy Bus	2011
A Zamperla Crazy Bus themed to SpongeBob SquarePants.
Chinese Puzzle Maze	Built in-house	Maze	1997
A grass maze.
Diego's Rainforest Rescue	Zamperla	Balloon Tower	2011
A balloon ride themed to Go, Diego, Go!.
Fairy World Taxi Spin	Zamperla	Aero Top Jet	2011
A spinning ride themed to The Fairly OddParents.
Impossible	Built in-house	Illusion house	2002
House of illusion, with mirror maze and haunted swing ride. Has been standing but not operating since 2023.
Krusty Krab Order Up	Moser's Rides	Drop Tower	2011
A 4.5 metre (15 ft) tall drop tower themed to the Krusty Krab restaurant from SpongeBob SquarePants.
Wonder Pets Big Circus Bounce	Zamperla	Jump Around	2011
A spinning children's ride themed to the Wonder Pets!.

=== Notable past attractions ===
Name	Opened	Closed	Description
Switchback	1891	1922	Out-and-back wooden coaster. Replaced by Big Dipper.
Hotchkiss' Bicycle Railway	1896	1900s	Remnants of this attraction are held in the Pleasure Beach archive.
Scenic Railway	1907	1933	A wooden coaster replaced by Grand National.
Water Chute	1907	1939	A wooden water ride.
Joy Wheel	1909	1915	A spinning ride.
Velvet Coaster	1909	1932	A wooden coaster replaced by Roller Coaster/Nickelodeon Streak.
Witching Waves	1913	1923	A large oval-shaped course with a movable metal floor, ridden on steerable scooter-style cars seating two people.
The Whip	1921	2008	A Whip ride, removed in 2008 and replaced by Dodgems. Was donated to the Save Dreamland Campaign.
Noah's Ark	1922	2008	Indoor walkthrough attraction.
Virginia Reel	1922	1982	A spinning wooden coaster replaced by Ranger Morph.
1001 Troubles	1927	2001	Mirror maze. A shortened version was combined with Haunted Swing to create Impossible.
Junior Whip	1927	2008	A smaller version of The Whip. Was donated to the Save Dreamland Campaign.
Super Bowl	1929	2009	Dodgems manufactured by Lusse Bros. After closure, the ride's Supercar Leisure/I.E. Park cars were sold and moved to Central Pier, Blackpool.
Magic Mountain	1932	2010	Junior dark ride replaced by Dora's World Voyage.
Fun House	1934	1991	An indoor walkthrough attraction destroyed by a fire. Replaced by Valhalla.
Turtle Chase	1935	2004	A Tumble Bug ride. The area the ride was located in is now occupied by Icon.
Ferris Wheel	1936	1984	A two-wheeled Ferris wheel.
Sidewinder	1939	1961	A dive-bomber ride replaced by Astro Liner.
Haunted Swing	1955	2001	Swing ride, later incorporated into Impossible.
Grand Prix	1960	2024	An Arrow Development electrically powered car ride (originally featured petrol engines). Self-driven cars that traveled down a spiral track.
Cableway	1960	2000	A classic Von Roll VR101 two-passenger gondola lift.
Crazy Daisy	1962	2016	Spinning teacups ride originally located in Beaver Creek and known as Tetley Tea Cup Ride. Later relocated to beneath Revolution.
Monorail	1966	2012	Opened as an aerial transport system with three stations, but closed as a non-stop scenic ride.
Drench Falls	1967	2006	A log flume. Replaced by Infusion.
Monster!	1968	1995	An Eyerly Aircraft Company Octopus ride replaced by Launch Pad.
Millennium Bug	1969	2003	A Frank Hrubetz & Company Round Up ride. Was previously known as Astro Swirl. Relocated to Pleasureland Southport in 2004 as Sand Storm.
Calypso	1960s	1960s	A spinning ride.
Speedboat	1960s	1978	A boat ride.
The Gold Mine	1971	2011	A dark ride. Its ride system and track were reused for its replacement, Wallace & Gromit's Thrill-O-Matic.
Cyclone	1974	1987	A Pinfari coaster replaced by Avalanche.
Tom Sawyer Raft Ride	1974	1993	A tow boat ride by Intamin.
Swamp Buggies	1979	2011	An upcharge bumper boat ride. Replaced by Icon.
Vikingar	1980	2004	Water ride, originally opened as Water Chute. Renamed Vikingar in 2000 to match the theme of Valhalla. Relocated from Belle Vue Zoological Gardens in Manchester.
Alpine Golf	1970s	2009	Swiss-themed miniature golf, previously located under Avalanche. Replaced by Alpine Rallye.
Astroglide	1970s	1992	A giant slide.
Astro Liner	1970s	1980s	A simulator ride.
Ben Hur	1970s	1980s	Similar to The Whip, but with a pedal to help start motion.
Space Tower	1974	1993	A slow spinning bird's-eye-view tower that was relocated to Frontierland Western Theme Park as Polo Tower. Replaced by The Big One.
Safari Bugs	1970s	2002	Animal vehicle roundabout. Was relocated to Adventure Coast Southport, and later to Lightwater Valley in 2007.
Tidal Wave	1980	1997	Pirate ship was relocated to Pleasureland Southport in 1998, then relocated to M&D's.
Tokaydo Express	1980	1997	A figure-eight coaster. It was relocated to Brean Leisure Park, and was later scrapped.
Trauma Towers	1980	2008	Indoor haunted walkthrough attraction originally known as The Haunted Hotel. Stood out of operation until 2018, when it was demolished.
The Hard Luck Bears Show	1980	1994	Electronically controlled animatronic show that featured a cast of singing and joke-telling bears manufactured by Creative Engineering, Inc. Relocated to Frontierland Western Theme Park as The Crazy Bear Show. Replaced by the Globe Theatre and Gallery.
Vintage Cars	1980	1981	Track ride. Replaced by Eddie Stobart Convoy.
Paratrooper	1981	1980s	Paratrooper ride.
Bobslay	1982	1982	A bobsleigh ride.
Ranger	1983	1987	A black pearl ride replaced by Rainbow.
Space Invader 2	1984	2008	Indoor roller coaster, originally known as Space Invader. It was relocated to Brean Leisure Park in 2011.
Rainbow	1987	1990s	A thrill ride.
Black Hole	1980s	2006	A waltzer. Replaced by 4D Cinema.
Phantom Chase	1980s	1980s	A spinning thrill ride.
Wild Mouse	1958	2017	Was one of only four remaining wooden wild mouse coasters in the world during its final season.
The Twist	1980s	1996	A spinning ride.
Clown Coaster	1980s	2008	A junior coaster that was also known as Nicky's Circus. Relocated to Wicksteed Park.
The Greatest Show on Earth	1990	1997	A suspended dark ride celebrating the world of entertainment. Replaced by a Burger King.
The Beast	Unknown	Unknown	A simulator ride of the wooden roller coaster at Kings Island.
Spin Doctor	2002	2006	A dive booster ride.
Big Apple	2003	2004	A Wacky Worm roller coaster that was a relocation from Frontierland Western Theme Park. Sold to a travelling showman in 2005. Replaced by The Beast.
Bling	2004	2011	A Zierer Star Shape ride. Replaced by Red Arrows Sky Force.
4D Cinema	2007	2008	Upcharge theatre attraction. Replaced by a puppet and magic show.
Bridgestone Go Karts	1982	2017	Upcharge go-karts which closed to make way for Icon.
Dodgems	2010	2024	A standard Dodgems set by I.E. Park, which opened after Super Bowl closed.
Eddie Stobart Convoy	2002	2024	Utilising the Veteran Cars circuit, this revamp opened in 2002. A children's automobile track ride featuring Zamperla vehicles painted in the old Eddie Stobart Ltd livery with names.
Alpine Rallye	2011	2024	A children's automobile track ride manufactured by Ihle. After the closure of Beaver Creek, the 'Thor's Turnpike' ride was renamed and relocated to near Avalanche.
Red Arrows Sky Force	2015	2024	Stood at 22 metres (72 ft). Gerstlauer Sky Fly ride. Featured individual planes on a long arm which spun as the ride vehicle rocked side to side. Replaced Bling. Partially dismantled as of 2025.
Gallopers	1979	2024	Made by traditional carousel builder Frederick Savage, this traditional carousel dated back to 1919. Sold to Northwest Funfairs.
Thompson Carousel	1977	2024	A miniature carousel ride formerly named Veteran Carousel in its original location within Beaver Creek. Manufactured by H.P. Jackson.

== Entertainment ==
=== Evolution of Magic ===
A Las Vegas-themed magic and illusion show performed by magicians Craig Christian and Elizabeth Best. Performed seasonally in The Horseshoe.

=== Hot Ice Show ===
A seasonal ice show performed at The Arena (previously the Ice Drome). The show has been running since 1936, and is produced by Amanda Thompson, with choreography by Oula Jääskeläinen.

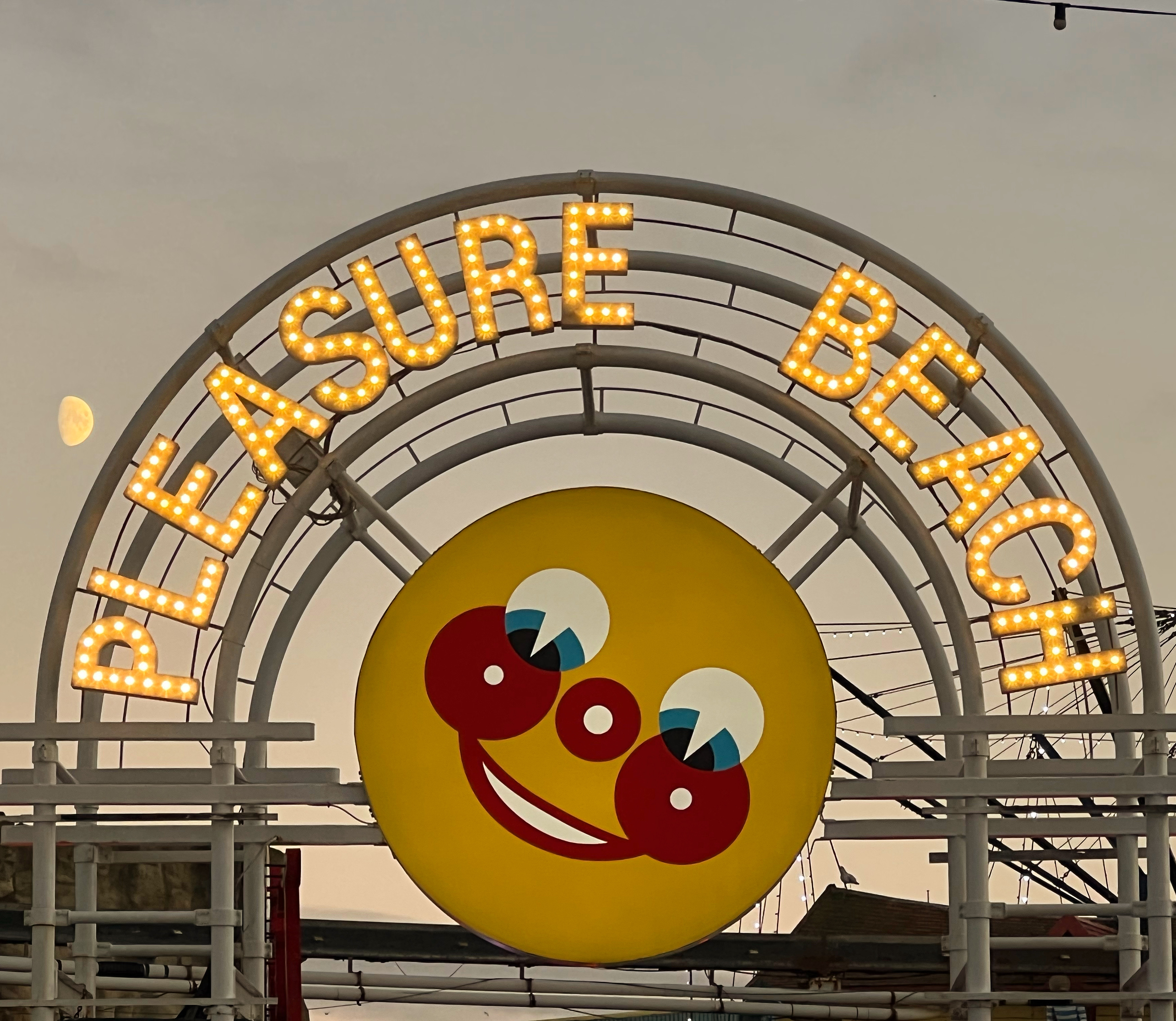
Pleasure Beach arches

=== Ken Webster: Mentalist Hypnotist ===
A former seasonal comedy hypnotism show performed by hypnotist Ken Webster. Ran from 1989 to 2026.

=== Mystique ===
A former illusion show headlined by Richard De Vere.

=== Spectacular Dancing Water Show ===
A £500,000 half-an-hour musical water show designed by Aquatique Show International. It features thirty individual jets synchronized to move to different styles of music, and a water cannon capable of shooting water up to 100 feet into the air.

== Other attractions ==
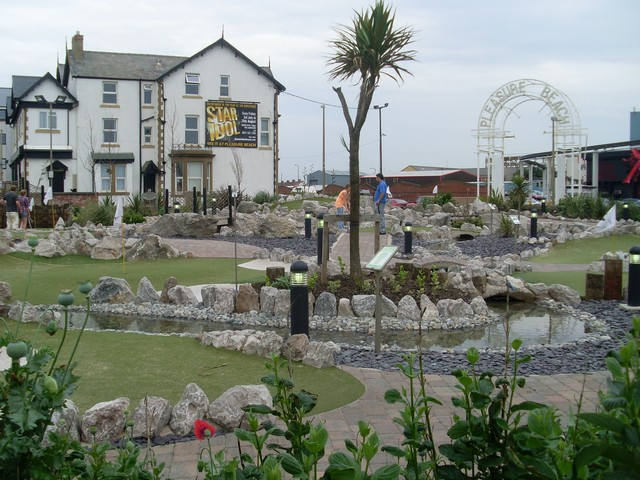
Adventure Golf

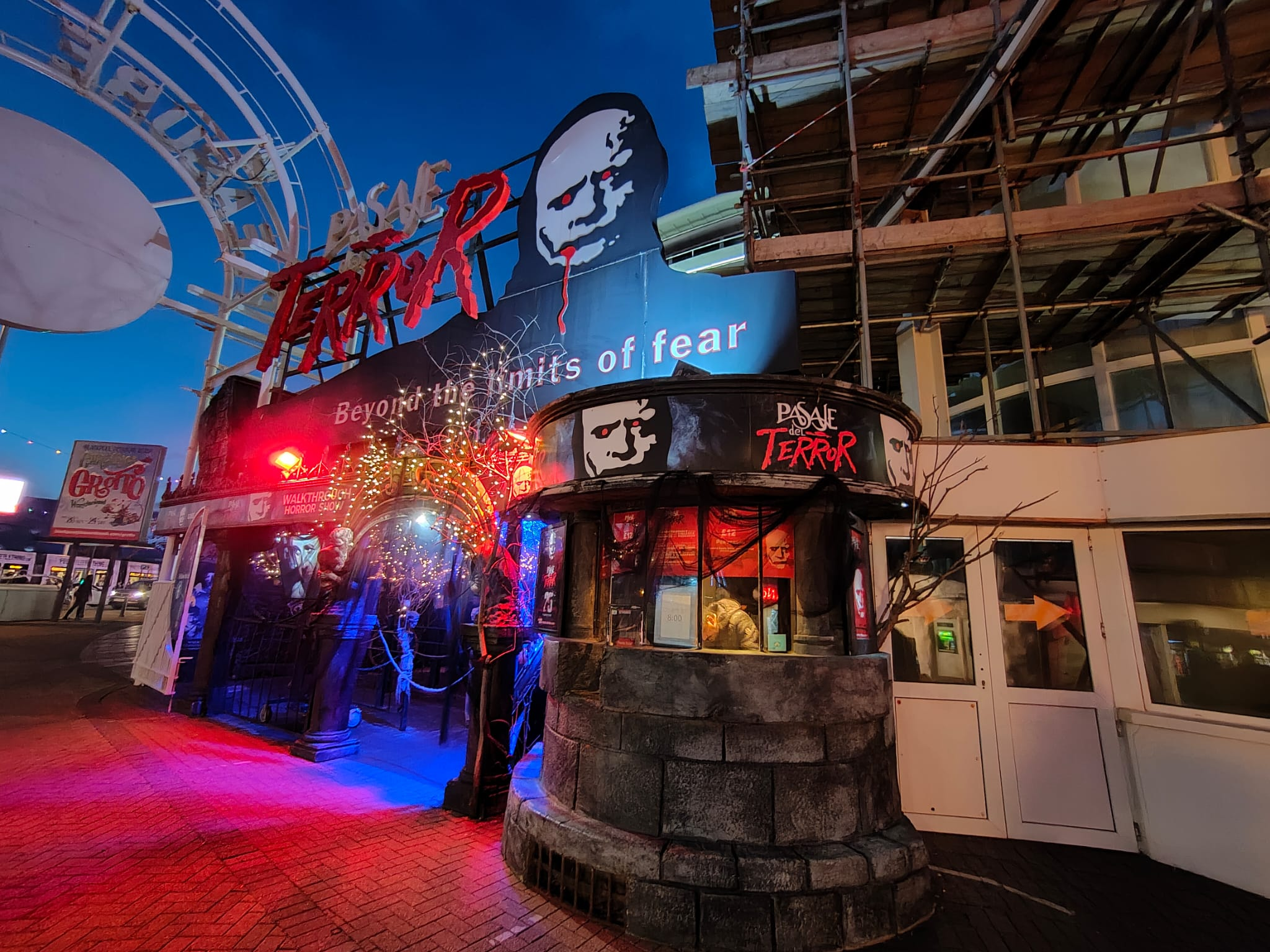
Pasaje Del Terror

=== Adventure Golf ===
A 12-hole golf course situated on the former Flagstaff Gardens site on the promenade. Opened in 2008.

=== Ripley's Believe It Or Not! ===
A museum of oddities built across two floors and inspired by Ripley's Believe It Or Not!. Situated along Ocean Boulevard.

=== Pasaje Del Terror ===
Interactive horror maze, situated towards the north end of Ocean Boulevard and adjacent to the entrance to Pleasure Beach. Opened in June 1998.

=== The Arena ===
A large ice rink situated towards the east of the park. Home to Hot Ice Show and open year-round.

== Accommodation ==
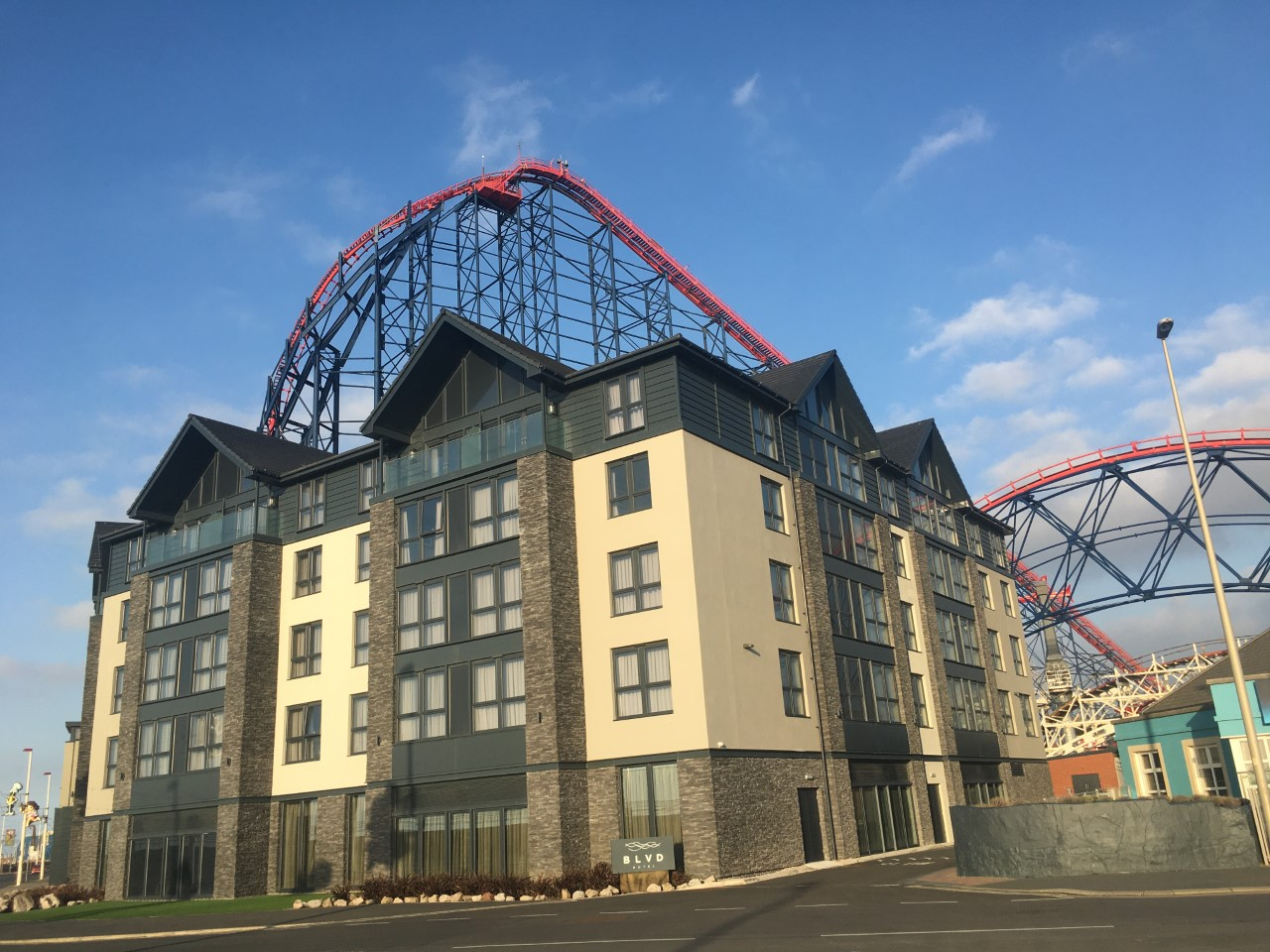
Boulevard Hotel

=== Big Blue Hotel ===
A family hotel called Big Blue Hotel sits on the property adjacent to Blackpool Pleasure Beach railway station, towards the south end of Ocean Boulevard. It opened in spring 2003.

=== Boulevard Hotel ===
In 2019, a second hotel, the Boulevard Hotel, was built on the site of the former Star Pub. The hotel features 120 rooms and 10 suites.

== Awards ==
- 2014: Second-Best Seaside Park – Golden Ticket Awards
- 2014, 2017, 2018, 2021, 2023: Valhalla - Best Water Ride in the World – Golden Ticket Awards
- 2023: 4th Best Theme Park in Europe - Traveler's Choice Awards

== Incidents ==
- On 21 July 2000, 11-year-old Christopher Sharrat died after falling from a ride vehicle on the Space Invader roller coaster. He was reported to have possibly panicked on the ride and unfastened his seatbelt. Following an investigation, authorities ruled the death as accidental. The ride closed in 2008 and has since relocated to Brean Leisure Park, opened there in 2011 as Astro Storm.
- On 31 August 2000, 23 people were injured when two trains collided on The Big One due to a failure with the ride's braking system. Twenty-one were taken to hospital.
- On 11 August 2009, two trains on Big Dipper carrying a total of 32 guests collided, resulting in 21 people requiring treatment for injuries ranging from whiplash and broken noses to cut and bruises.
- On 14 June 2011, a train on The Big One stopped abruptly, causing a few minor injuries to the occupants. One person was reportedly taken to hospital suffering from whiplash.
- On 24 October 2014, 58-year-old Robert Sycamore accompanied his 13-year-old nephew on Grand National. When the ride returned to the station, Sycamore was found unresponsive with a broken neck. It was later revealed he had an underlying back condition.
- On 23 July 2026, a train on Big Dipper rolled backwards mid-ride and ripped several wooden beams out of the centre of the track, causing one car of the train to derail. No one was seriously injured, and the ride was closed pending an investigation and repairs.

== In popular culture ==
- In 1997, Pleasure Beach was the subject of a six-part BBC documentary which focused on the daily operation of the park. Each episode featured interviews with park management, and dealt with the everyday triumphs and hurdles of running an amusement park.
- Popular ITV soap opera Coronation Street has featured several scenes shot at Pleasure Beach.
- The music video for Simply Red's 1995 song "Fairground" was filmed at Pleasure Beach.
- The scenarios "Bumbly Beach" in the video game RollerCoaster Tycoon (1999) and "Blackpool Pleasure Beach" in the Loopy Landscapes expansion (2000) are based on the park.
- In 2002, Most Haunted conducted a paranormal investigation at Pleasure Beach.
- The music video for The Killers' 2012 song "Here with Me" featured scenes filmed at the park.
- The music video for 5 Seconds of Summer's song "Try Hard" featured sections recorded at the park.

== Gallery ==
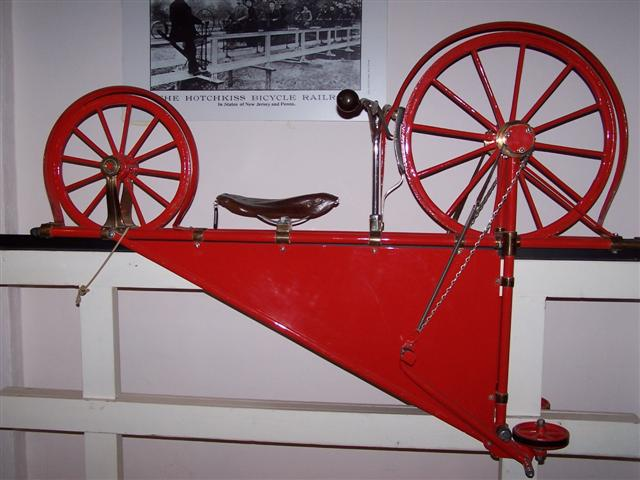
Hotchkiss Bicycle Railroad

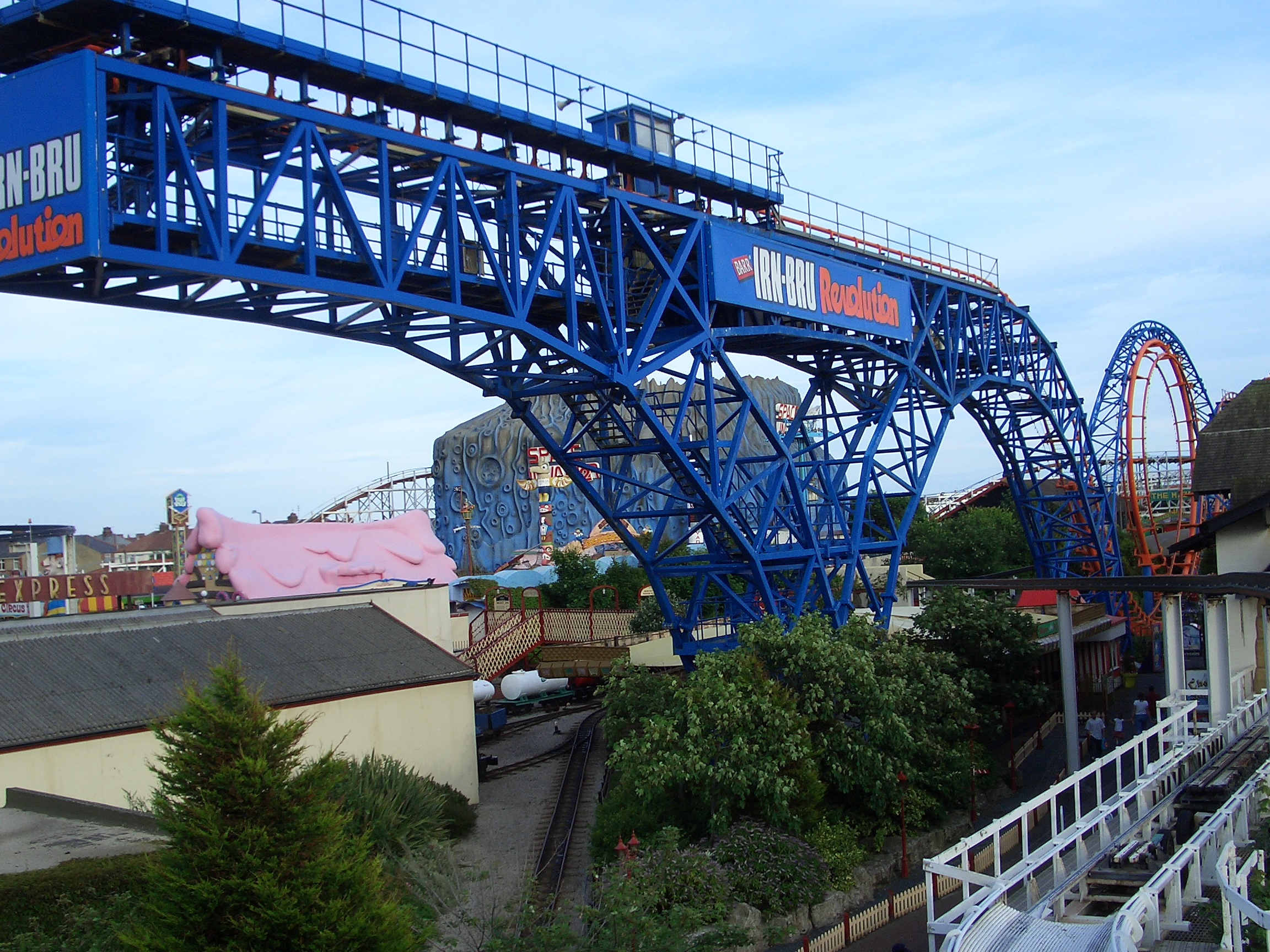
Revolution

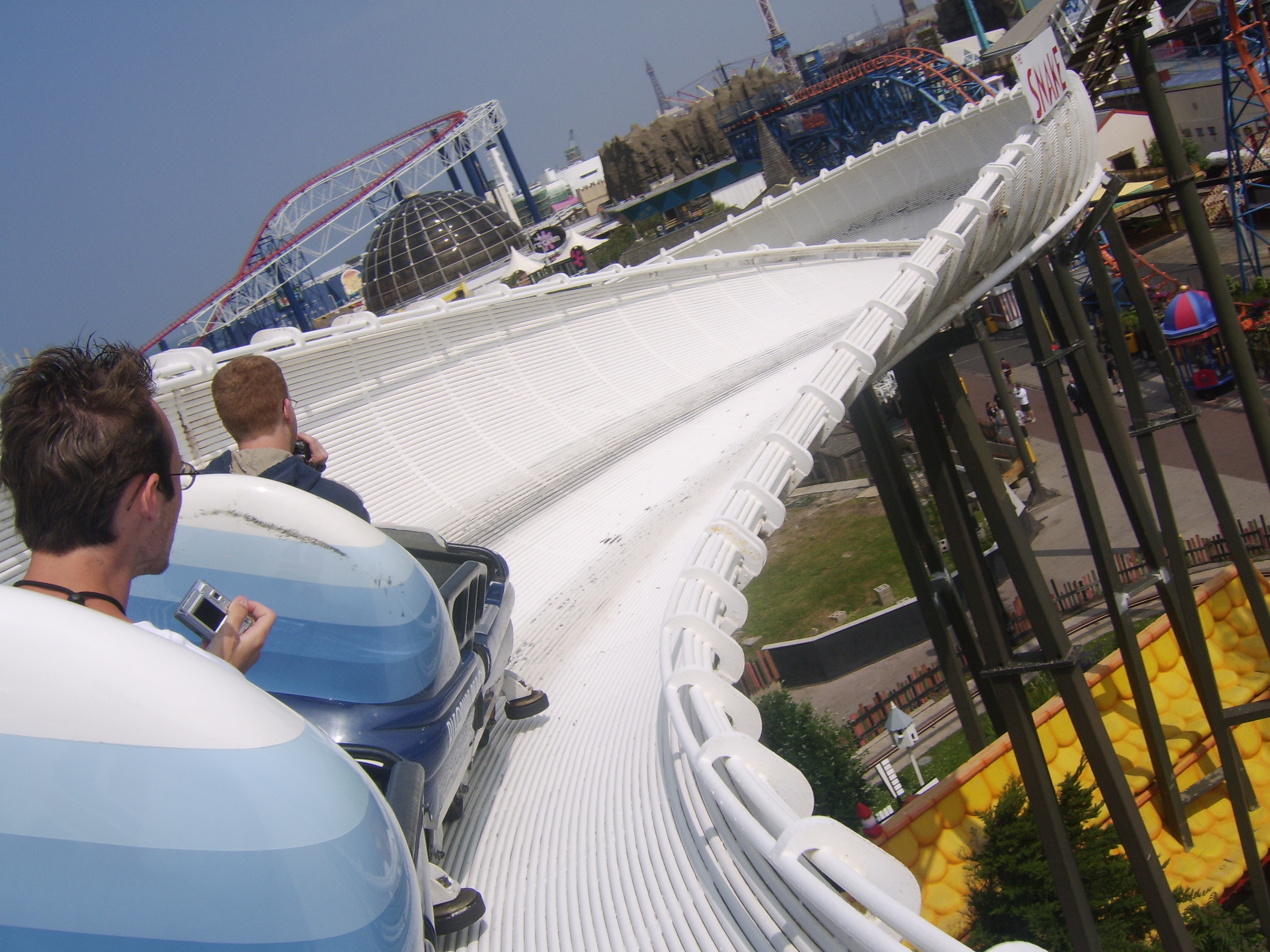
Avalanche

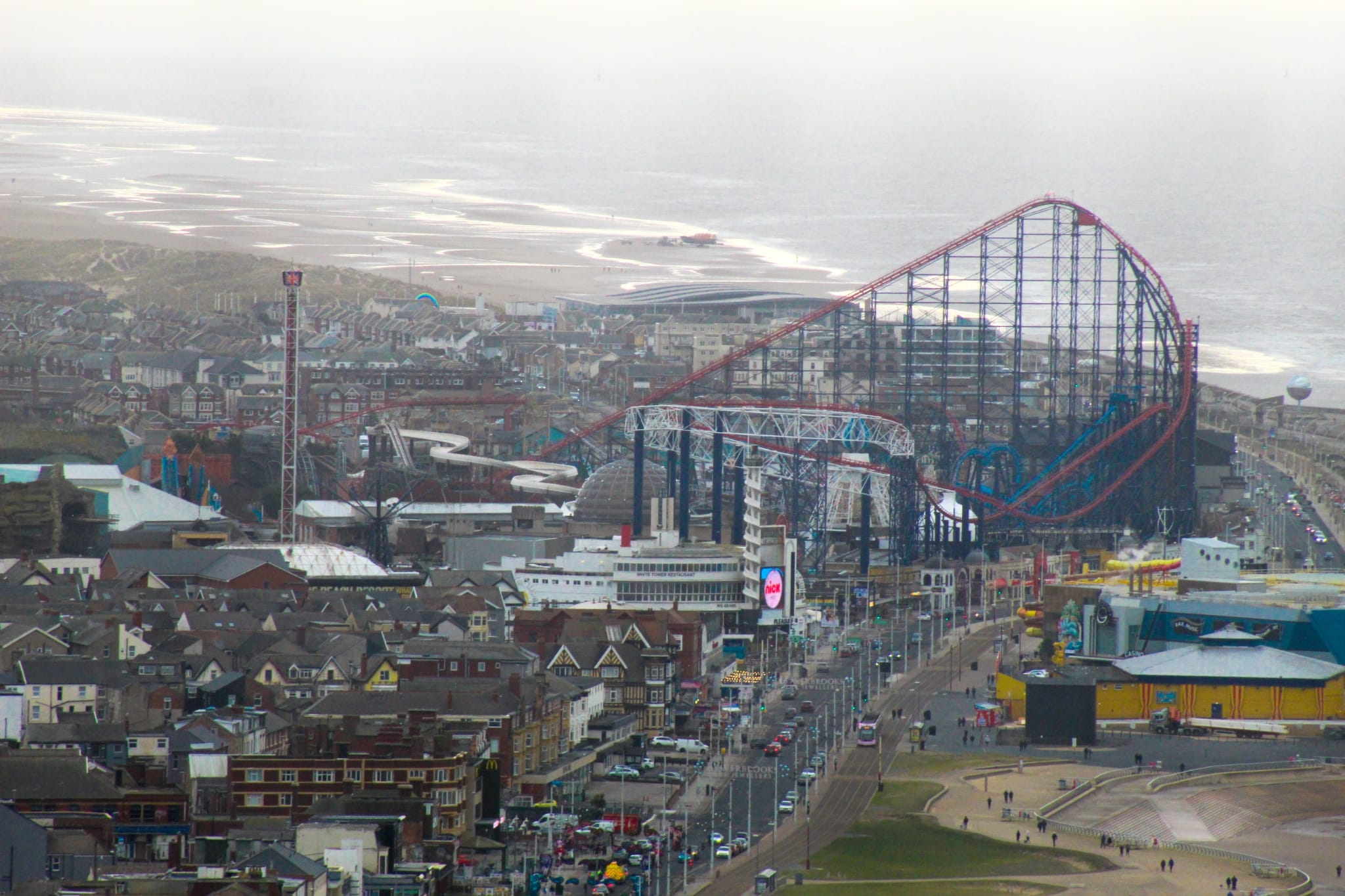
Aerial view of the park

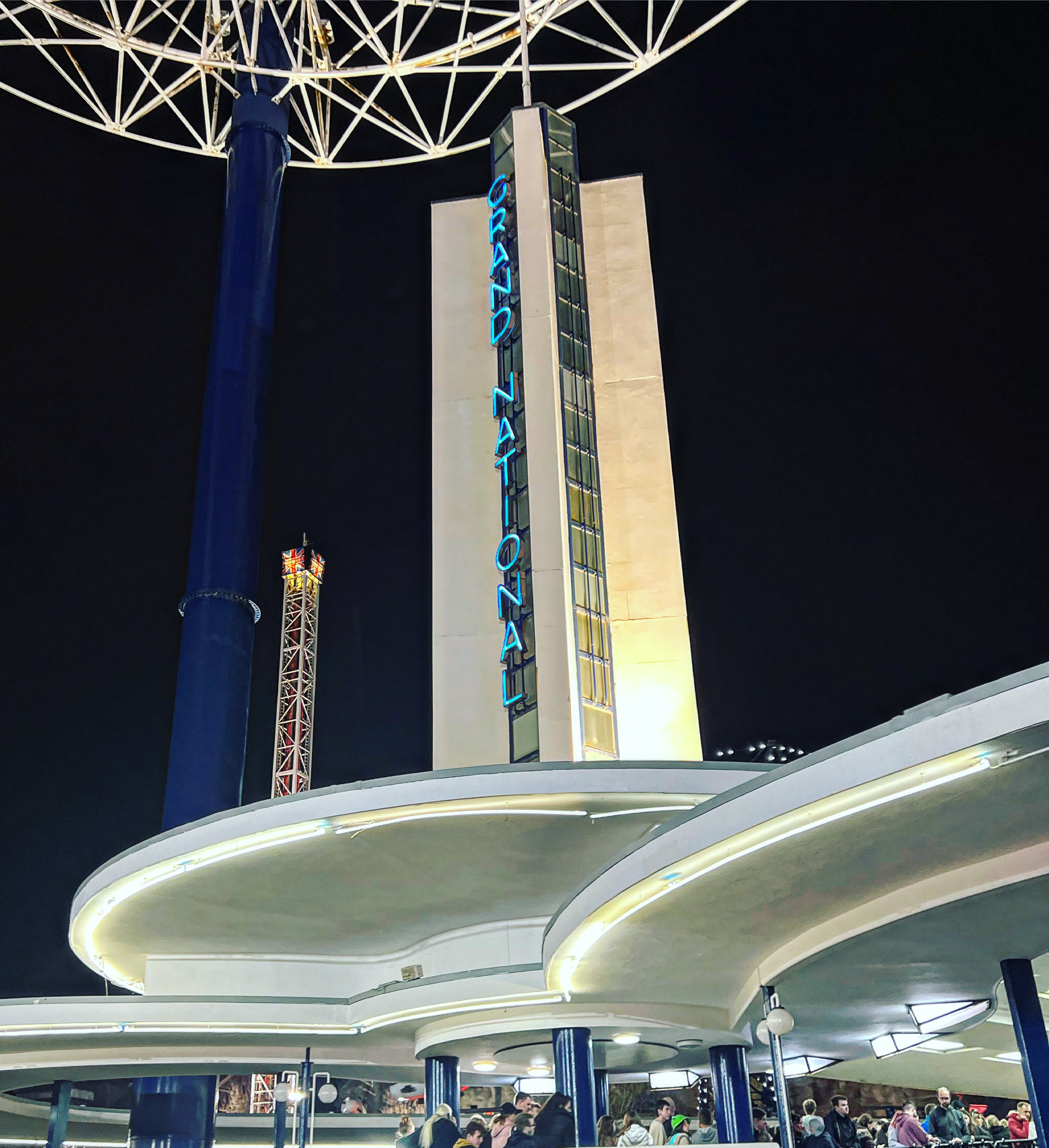
Grand National

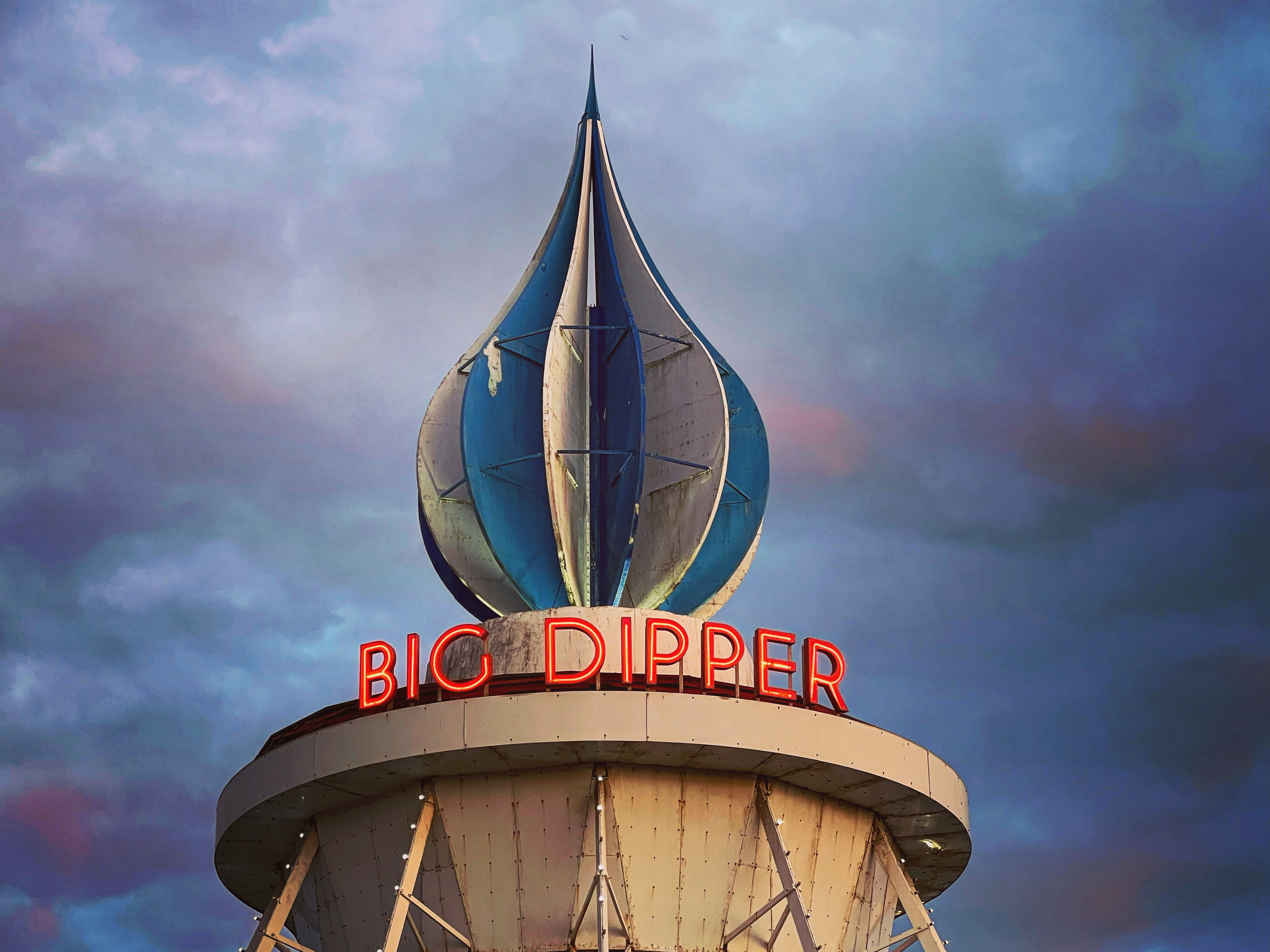
Big Dipper

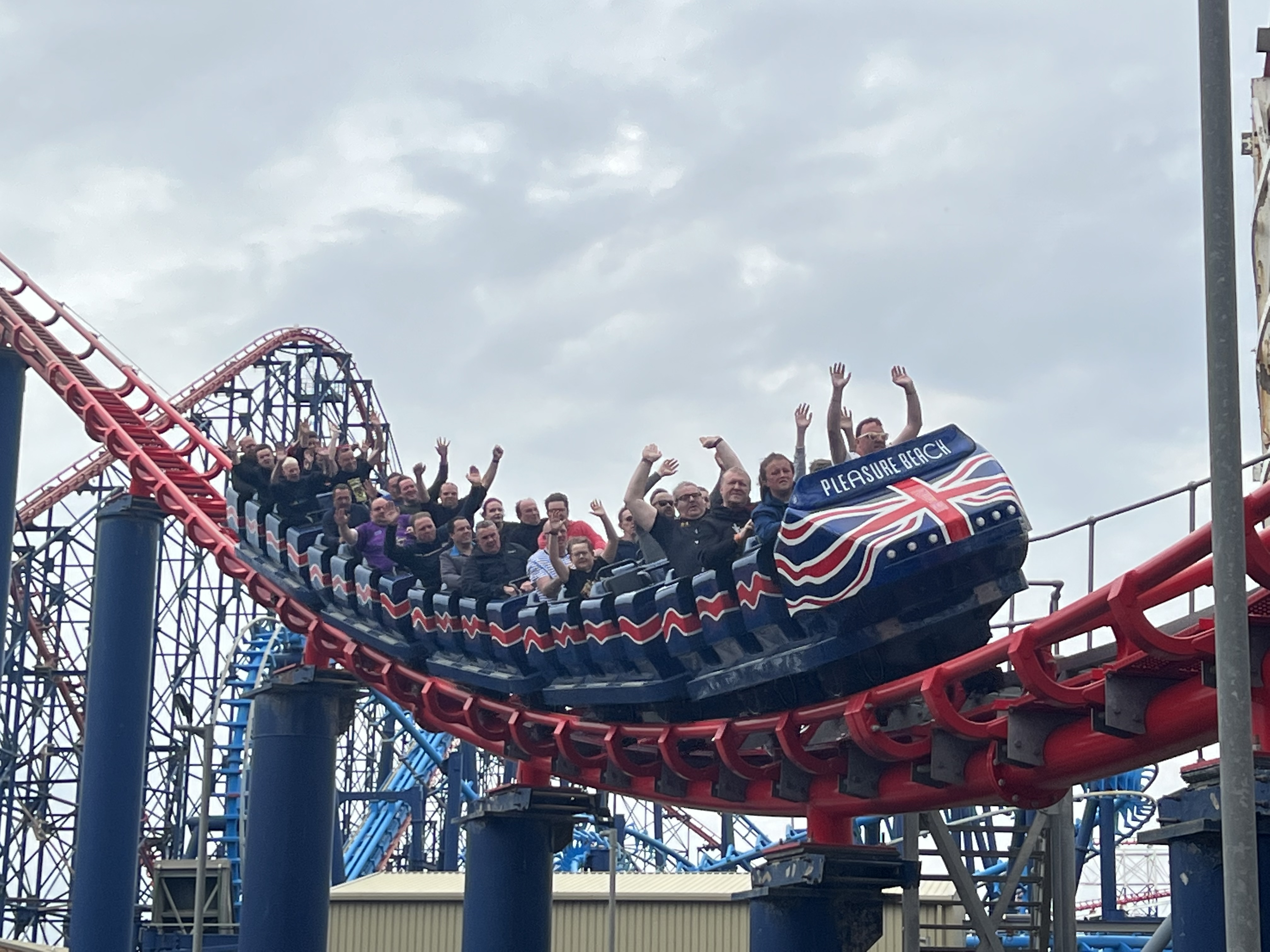
The Big One

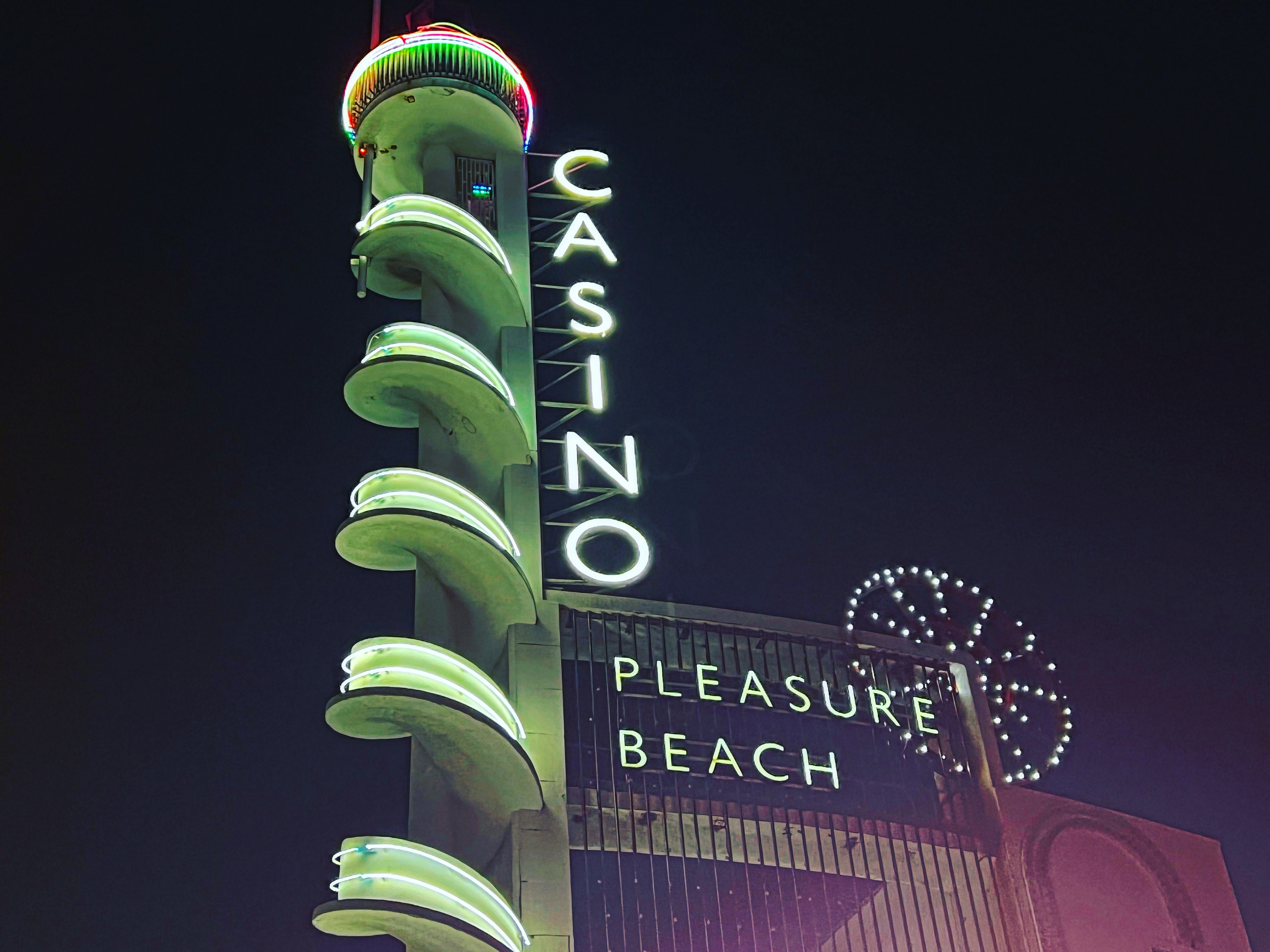
Casino Building at night

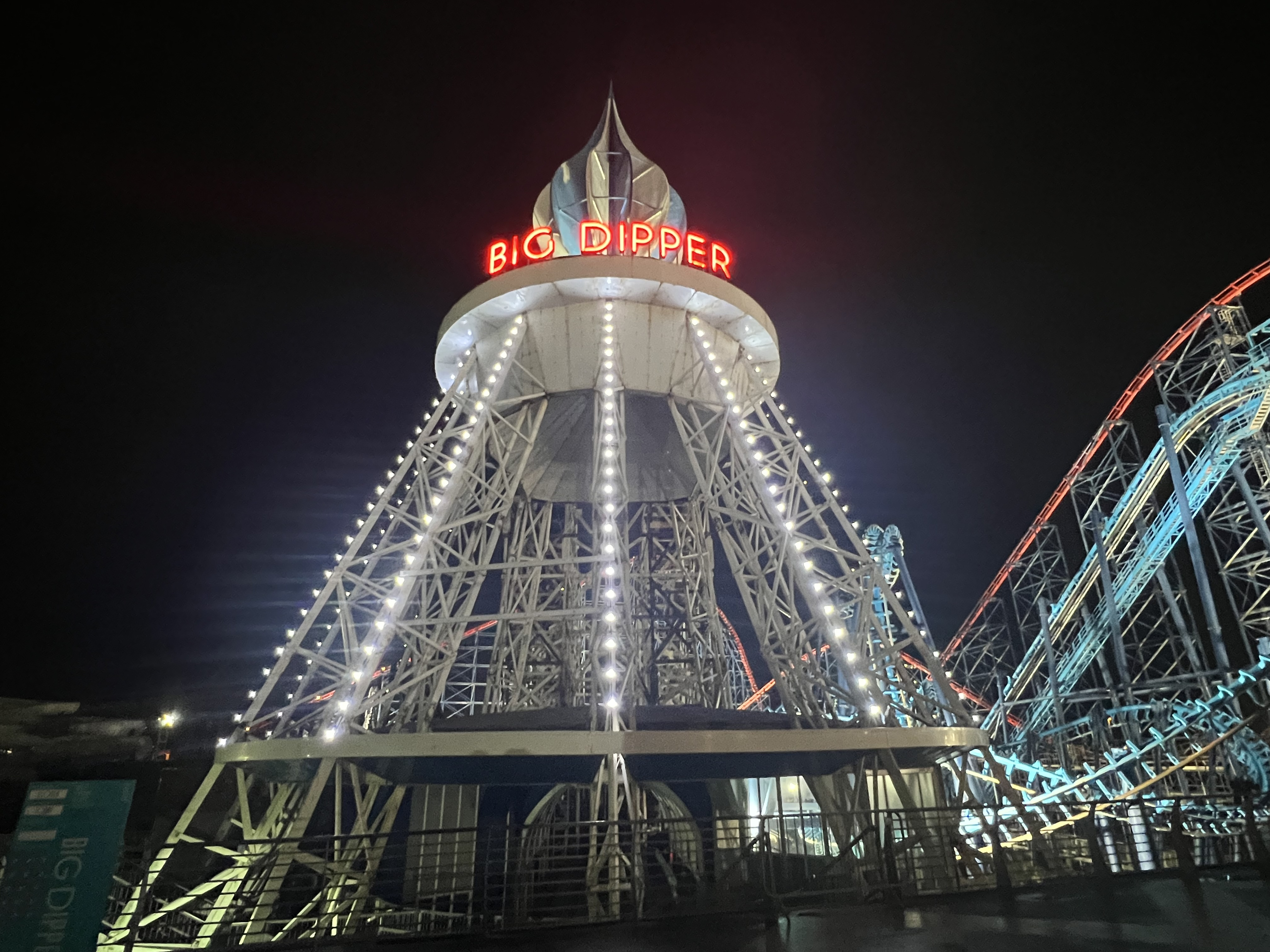
Big Dipper at night

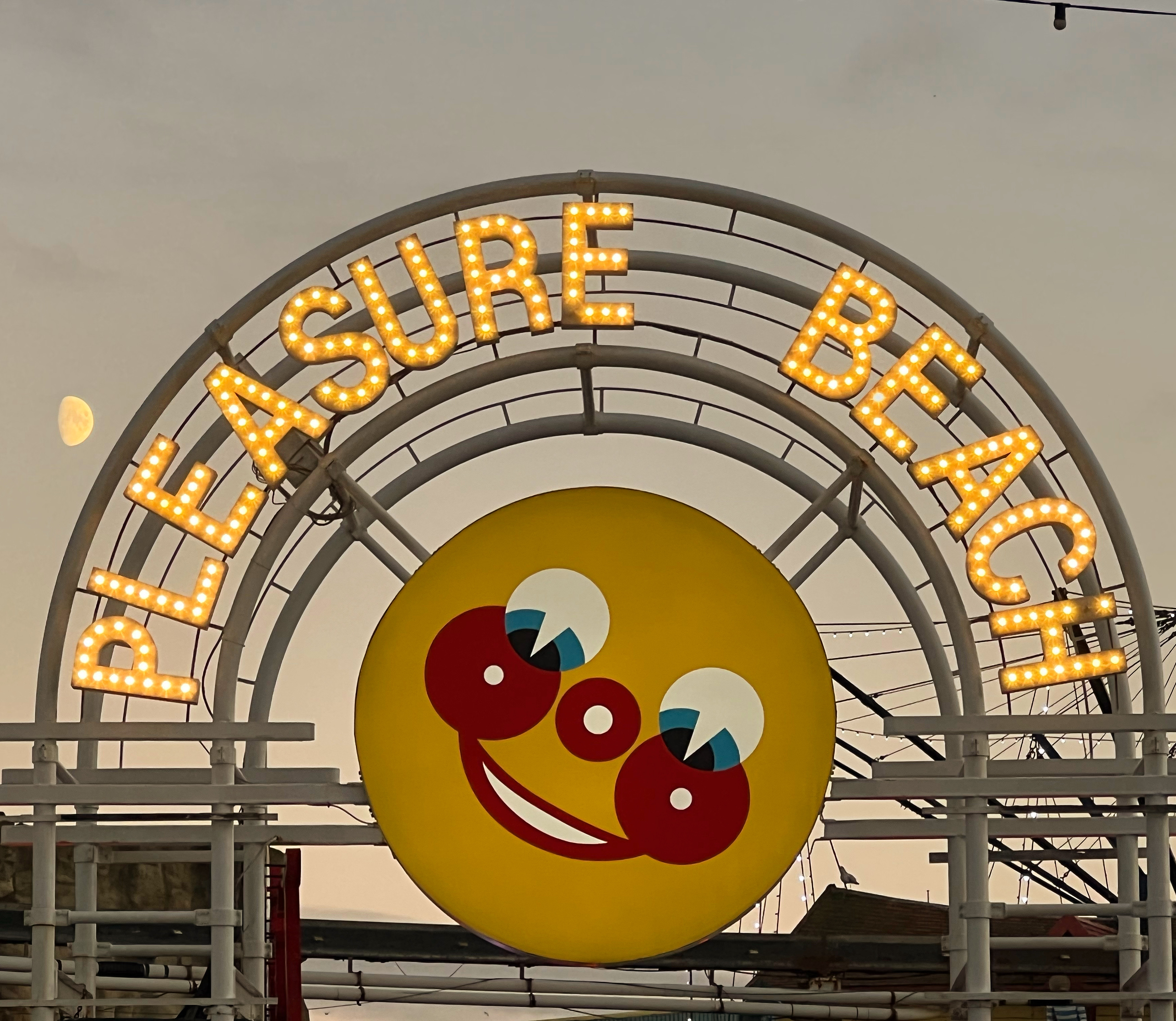
Pleasure Beach arches

== See also ==
- Adventure Coast Southport
- Frontierland Western Theme Park
