= Wild Mouse (Blackpool Pleasure Beach) =

Former wooden roller coaster at Pleasure Beach Resort

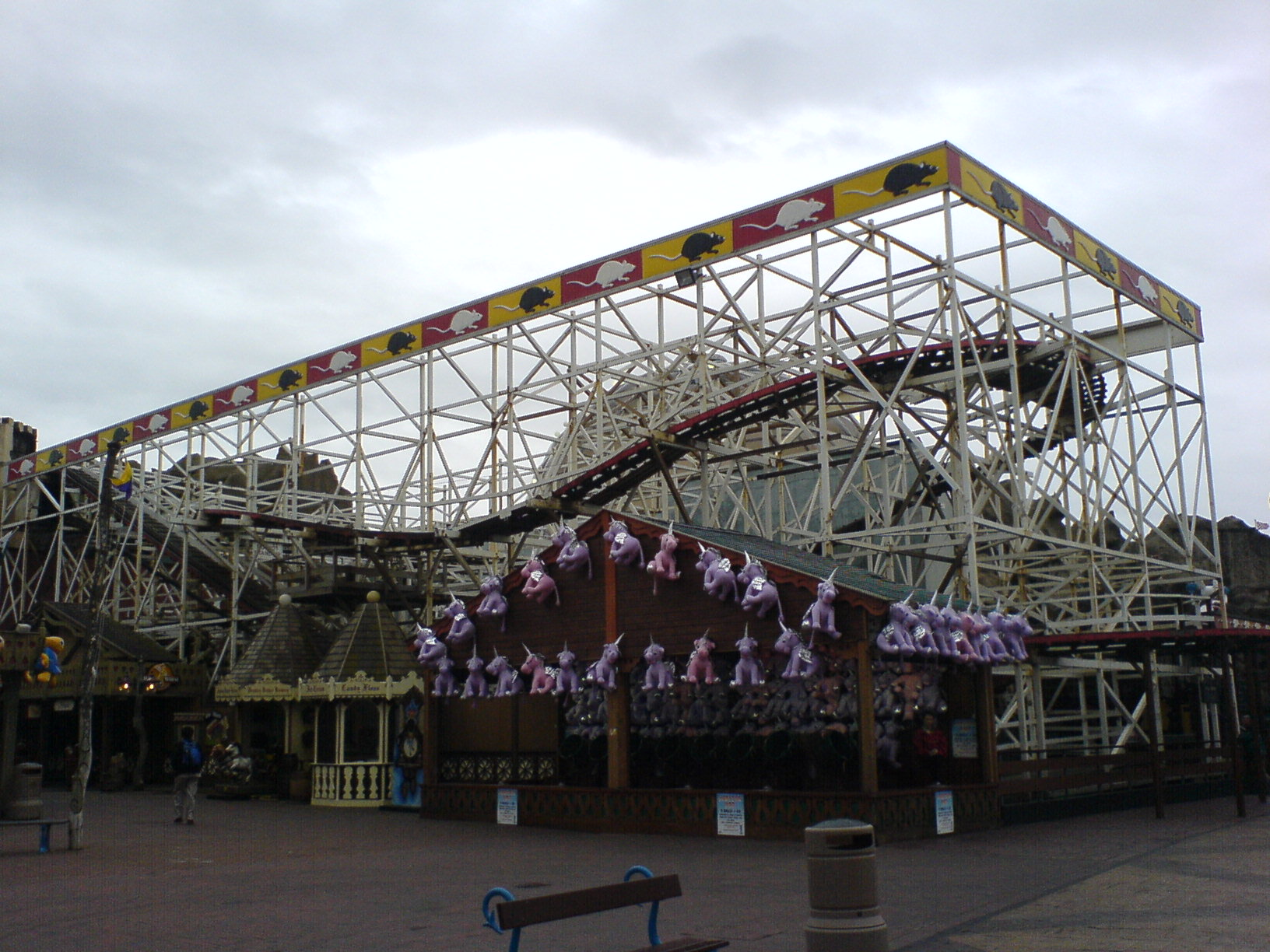

Pleasure Beach Resort
- Location: Pleasure Beach Resort
- Coordinates: 53°47′29″N 3°03′22″W
- Status: Removed
- Opening date: 1958
- Closing date: 2017

General statistics
- Type: Wood – Wild Mouse
- Manufacturer: Pleasure Beach Resort
- Designer: Frank Wright
- Length: 1,266 ft (386 m)
- Inversions: 0
- Height restriction: 52 in (132 cm)
- Trains: 12 trains with a single car; riders arranged 1 across in 2 rows for a total of 2 riders per train
- Wild Mouse at RCDB

Wild Mouse was a wooden roller coaster at Blackpool Pleasure Beach (better known as Pleasure Beach Resort) in Blackpool, England. It opened in 1958, and was one of only four remaining wooden wild mouse coasters left in the world during its final season of operation.

After remaining closed for the majority of the 2017 season, the ride was removed in January 2018 to make way for "future developments".

== History ==
Both the design and construction of Wild Mouse, which began in 1955, were done entirely in-house by Pleasure Beach Resort and Frank Wright. It opened in 1958 as the first major ride to be built at the park since World War II.

The ride was modified in the 1960s by the Velare brothers. The top circuit preceding the switchbacks, containing a large drop and a shallower dip, was added, making the ride a third longer than it had previously been, now measuring 386 metres (1,266 ft). This change was inspired by a similar alteration made to another of the Velare's wild mouse coasters, Wild Mouse at Nu-Pike in California.

The ride was temporarily closed in November 2007 for a 'complete refurbishment' of the ride, replacing wood and repainting the structure. It reopened in the summer of 2008.

Magnetic brakes were installed in the final brake run following the 2016 season, eliminating the need for manually operated brakes. The ride reopened in April 2017 following installation and testing of the new brakes. However, it appeared to experience more frequent technical issues than it previously did. The ride closed in August 2017 prior to the season ending. The park stated the ride was closed for maintenance, and had reportedly ordered parts for further modernisation.

Wild Mouse was torn down following the 2017 season with no prior announcement made. The ride was still cited as being "closed for maintenance" on the park's official website, even after it had been completely removed. Pleasure Beach Resort released a statement in January 2018 confirming the permanent removal of the ride from the park stating, "After very careful consideration and planning, our current winter work programme has seen the permanent closure and dismantling of the Wild Mouse".

The site has been empty since the ride's removal. The area has been used to host minor entertainment in a temporary events area named The Hub.

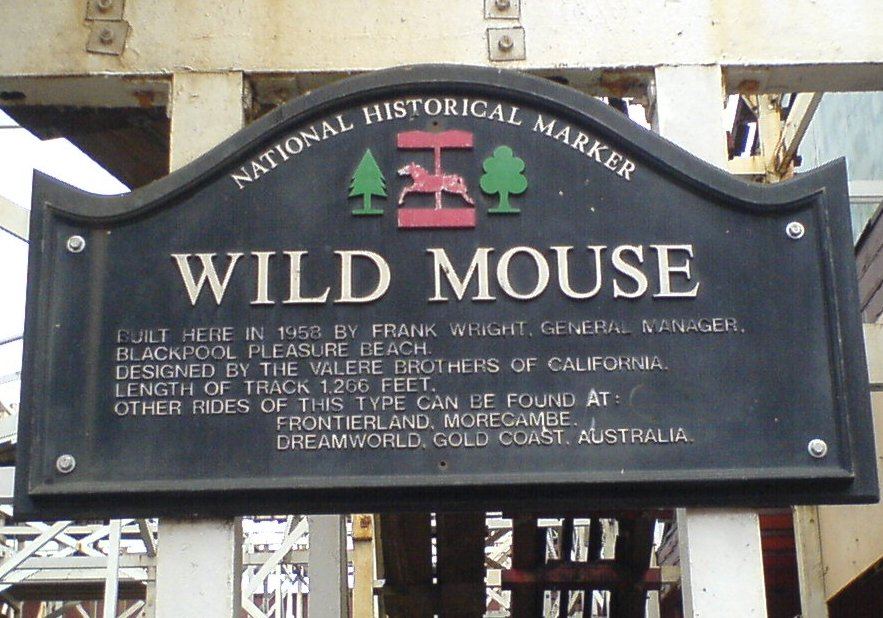
Wild Mouse historic plaque

== Ride experience ==
Upon dispatch from the station, two 90-degree turns led to the lift hill. At the top of the ride came the first of multiple 90-degree turns. Trim brakes were present just before the next turn, which led to the first drop. Following this drop, the car traversed a series of hairpin turns, then two more 90-degree turns, followed immediately by two steep drops. These were followed by a turnaround out of the structure over the queue lines. The car travelled towards the lift hill, before a right-left chicane changed its direction again. This was immediately followed by the final dip and another 90-degree turn. One final turn brought the car back into the station.

== Awards ==
Golden Ticket Awards: Top wood Roller Coasters
Year									1998	1999
Ranking									–	–
Year	2000	2001	2002	2003	2004	2005	2006	2007	2008	2009
Ranking	–	–	–	37 (tie)	–	–	–	–	–	–
Year	2010	2011	2012	2013	2014	2015	2016	2017	2018	2019
Ranking	–	44 (tie)	49	–	43	26	32	36	–	–
Year	2020	2021	2022	2023	2024	2025	2026			
Ranking	N/A	–	–	–	–	–	–			
