= Listed buildings in Blackpool =

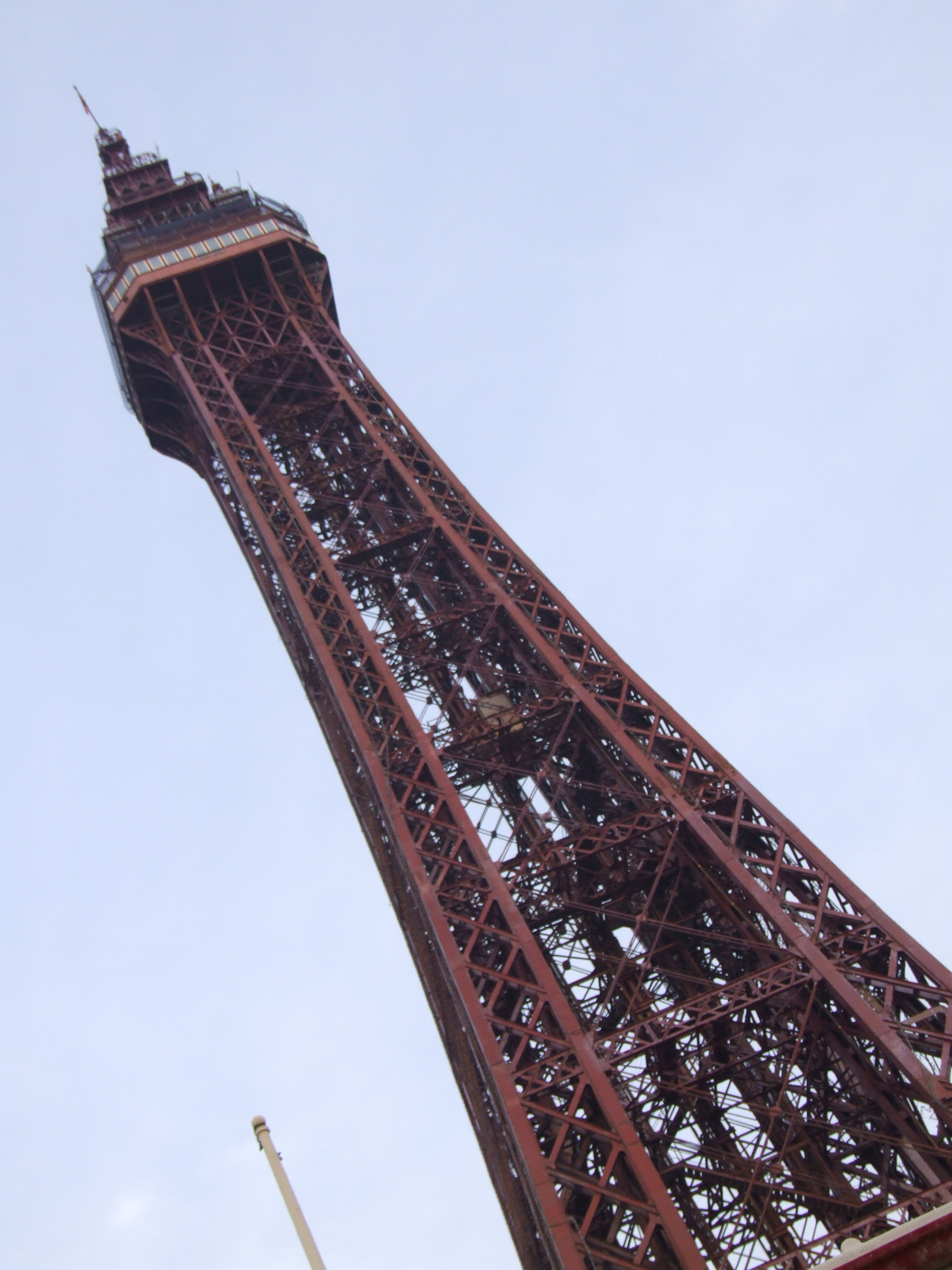
Blackpool Tower, completed in 1894, is Blackpool's only Grade I listed building.

Blackpool is a seaside town and unitary authority situated on The Fylde coast in Lancashire, England. This list includes the listed buildings in Blackpool and Bispham, a village within the borough of Blackpool. One is classified by English Heritage as being in Grade I and five in Grade II*. In the United Kingdom, the term "listed building" refers to a building or other structure officially designated as being of special architectural, historical or cultural significance. These buildings are in three grades: Grade I consists of buildings of outstanding architectural or historical interest; Grade II* includes particularly significant buildings of more than local interest; Grade II consists of buildings of special architectural or historical interest. Buildings in England are listed by the Secretary of State for Culture, Media and Sport on recommendations provided by English Heritage, which also determines the grading.

== Key ==
Explanation of the listed building grades
Grade	Criteria
Grade I	Buildings of exceptional interest, sometimes considered to be internationally important.
Grade II*	Particularly important buildings of more than special interest.
Grade II	Buildings of national importance and special interest.

== Listed buildings ==
List of the buildings and structures with photographs, locations, year or time of earliest construction, descriptive notes, and listed building grade
Name and location	Photograph	Grade	Date	Description
Blackpool Tower buildings 53.8158°N 3.0553°W		I	1891–1894	Blackpool Tower was built 1891–94 on the site of Dr Cocker's Aquarium and Menagerie, commissioned by the newly formed Blackpool Tower Company, which was chaired by Blackpool mayor John Bickerstaffe. Inspired by the Eiffel Tower, which had opened in 1889, Blackpool Tower was built to a design by Maxwell and Tuke and quickly became a popular attraction. Built of open steel girders, the tower measures 518 feet (158 m) from the ground to the top of its flagmast. The listed buildings include the tower itself, the ballroom, circus and roof gardens. The ballroom decoration was designed by Frank Matcham.
Grand Theatre; 53.8179°N 3.0460°W		II*	1893–1894	The Grand Theatre was designed by Frank Matcham and built over seven months, opening in 1894. It is constructed in the Baroque style of brick and stone, with a copper-covered fish scale dome, which is topped with a cupola. The auditorium has an ornate semicircular proscenium with frilly plasterwork and the ceiling contains six large panels radiating from an elaborate centrepiece with plasterwork and portraits of composers. In 1973, a group called the Friends of the Grand saved the building from demolition.
Sacred Heart Church; 53.8195°N 3.0537°W		II*	1857	The Roman Catholic Sacred Heart Church was built in 1857, designed by Edward Welby Pugin, and was enlarged in 1894 to a design by Pugin & Pugin. It is constructed in stone with slate roofs. Its tower to the west is in four stages, with angled buttresses and battlemented coping, topped with tall pinnacles. The crossing of 1894 is octagonal and has a pyramidal roof of copper above an octagonal wooden lantern.
Shrine of Our Lady of Lourdes; 53.8229°N 3.0165°W		II*	1955–57	The shrine is a chapel of thanksgiving, built to celebrate the relatively small loss of life and damage to property in the Roman Catholic Diocese of Lancaster during the Second World War. It is dedicated to Our Lady of Lourdes, the patron saint of the diocese. It was built 1955–57 and was designed by Francis Xavier Velarde. It is constructed in Portland stone with copper cladding to its roof and flèche. It is cared for by the Historic Chapels Trust.
Winter Gardens; 53.8171°N 3.0509°W		II*	1878	Designed by Thomas Mitchell, the Winter Gardens building was built 1875-78, with additions in 1894, 1897, 1930–31 and 1939. Listed on 10 October 1973.
1 and 2 Fishers Lane; 53.7817°N 3.0195°W		II	Probably late 18th century	These single-storey cobbled wall dwellings were probably built in the late 18th century. Both have roofs of thatch, corrugated metal and slate. Each cottage has a gable-end chimney stack, with the main doors situated close to the gable ends. Both have modern extensions to the rear and sides.
Bispham Parish Church (All Hallows); 53.8569°N 3.0368°W		II	1883	The third church to exist on this site, All Hallows was built in 1883 by John Lowe.
Blackpool United Hebrew Congregation; 53.818°N 3.0438°W		II	1916–1926	This synagogue was built 1916–1926, to a design by Blackpool alderman and justice of the peace Robert Butcher Mather, with alterations in 1955 and 1976. It is constructed of red brick with ashlar dressings, pantile and lead roofs in a mix of the Edwardian Baroque and Byzantine styles. An octagonal dome rises from the rear. Its stained glass windows depict scenes from the Torah including the Twelve Tribes of Israel.
Blowing Sands and attached wall 53.78267°N 3.02134°W		II	Late 18th century	Now one cottage, the building was originally two cottages, probably built in the late 18th century, with a workshop added in the 19th century. It is constructed from cobble and brick, with slate roofs and gable chimney stacks. The attached wall is approximately 2 metres (6.6 ft) high, constructed of coursed cobbles with brick lacing.
Cabin Lift; 53.83835°N 3.05512°W		II	1930	Designed by John Charles Robinson in the Classical Revival style, the Cabin Lift was built in 1930. It has a rectangular plan and is constructed of brick with faience dressings with a copper roof. A seaside lift tower, its purpose was to transport passengers between the tram stop on the upper promenade and the lower promenade walkway below. It was listed on 8 March 2010.
Central Library and Grundy Art Gallery; 53.8204°N 3.0525°W		II	1909–10	The library and art gallery were built 1909–10 to a design by Cullen, Lockhead and Brown. They are constructed of red brick with buff stone dressings in the Edwardian Baroque style. The library's corner entrance has a leaded dome above a frieze bearing the words 'Central Public Library'. The art gallery's entrance has a portico of coupled Ionic columns.
St John's Church; 53.8182°N 3.0509°W		II	1878	The church was built in 1878 to a design by Garlick, Park and Sykes, and replaced a smaller church on the same site from 1821. Built of stone, with slate roofs, it is in the Early English style. The tower, at the south west, has four stages and angled buttresses topped with pinnacles and finials. The ashlar interior includes a nave with low aisles, tall transepts and an apsidal chancel. It is Blackpool's Anglican parish church.
Elmslie School; 53.8094°N 3.0312°W		II	1896	"The Elms" was a house built in 1896 for the Powell family, to a design by T. P. Worthington. The building is constructed of sandstone with ashlar dressings at the front, and of red brick to the sides and rear. The plan is an irregular 'L' shape with two storeys and there are three bays at the front. Large bay windows on the upper floor are flanked by pinnacles. The interiors include original plasterwork on the ceilings and walls. The house was occupied by Elmslie School for most of the 20th century.
Funny Girls (former Odeon Cinema); 53.8214°N 3.0514°W		II	1938–39	This Odeon cinema was built 1938–39, to a design by Robert Bullivant from Harry Weedon's firm. It is constructed of brick, with white and green and black faience, over a steel frame in the Art Deco style. It was built with 3,088 seats and in 1975, the auditorium was split into three smaller cinema screens. The cinema closed in 1998. The former stalls area is now occupied by the Funny Girls burlesque cabaret show.
General Post Office; 53.8187°N 3.0516°W		II	1910	The post office was built in 1910 to a design by architects from the Office of Works. It is constructed of Portland stone with a green slate hip roof in the Renaissance style. Its plan is rectangular and there are threes storeys. The entrances are flanked by atlantes that support segmental canopies.
Holy Trinity Church; 53.7965°N 3.0535°W		II	1878	Holy Trinity Church was built in 1878 to a design by R. Knill Freeman, extending and then replacing a church from 1832. It is constructed of yellow sandstone with red sandstone dressings, in the Decorated Gothic style. The roofs are slate. The tower to the north west has five stages with triplets of two-light bell openings. The nave has three bays with pilaster buttresses. Two large stained glass windows in the south transept were designed by Shrigley and Hunt.
Imperial Hotel; 53.8273°N 3.0546°W		II	1866–67	The Imperial Hotel was built 1866–67, by Clegg and Knowles of Manchester and was extended in 1875 with an additional wing. It was extended again in 1904 by J. B. Broadbent. It is in the French Renaissance and Baroque styles and is constructed of red brick with stone dressings and slate hip roofs. It was described by Nikolaus Pevsner as the "climax of Blackpool hôtellerie".
King Edward Picture House; 53.8124°N 3.0507°W		II	1913	The King Edward Picture House was built in 1913 of Accrington brick with stone-coloured dressings and has a barrel-vaulted roof. Its plan is rectangular and the façade is semi-circular. Above the ground floor, the symmetrical façade has a central pedimented gable between banded pilasters. Inside there is an auditorium with a balcony and a small foyer with decorated cornice. By 1972 the cinema had closed and the building was in use as a bingo hall and social club. Later uses included a nightclub and a family entertainment centre. Since 2011, the building has lain empty and boarded up.
Layton Cemetery Chapel; 53.8280°N 3.0332°W		II	1873	Layton Cemetery's Anglican mortuary chapel was built in 1873, to a design by Garlick, Park and Sykes. It is a single-storey building with three bays and a central three-stepped-stage tower. The tower has an octagonal spire with a splayed base, lucarnes and exaggerated buttresses. The entrance to the chapel is through a porch in the lower stage of the tower.
Little Marton Mill; 53.7991°N 2.9902°W		II	1840	Little Marton Mill was built in 1840 on the site of another mill. A working mill until the 1920s, it was renovated c. 1968. The mill is constructed of rendered brick; the wooden cap and sails (without vanes) are from the restoration in 1968. The plan is circular, with four storeys and a basement. It has two doors; one to the east at basement level, and one to the west above basement level.
Methodist Chapel; 53.8229°N 3.0533°W		II	c. 1890–1900	This chapel was built c. 1890–1900 to a design by G. Payton of Birmingham and was altered in the 1970s. It is constructed of red brick with Flemish bond and ashlar dressings in the Gothic Revival style. The roofs are of slate. The octagonal tower, to the south-west, has three stages and a spire. The upper stage is carved with swirling designs.
Miners' Convalescent Home; 53.8453°N 3.0524°W		II	1925–27	The Miners' Convalescent Home was built 1925–27 to a design by Bradshaw Gass & Hope. It is constructed in the Baroque style of red brick with terracotta dressings. It has slate hip roofs, and a large tower at the back, with an ogee-shaped cap. Built as a specialist hospital building, it was converted to apartments in 2005.
New Clifton Hotel; 53.8186°N 3.0555°W		II	1874	The New Clifton Hotel was built 1865-74, first extending, then replacing, the Clifton Arms Hotel. It is constructed of brick with stone dressings, stone quoins and string courses. Its roofs are slate. The building is of four storeys and the front has five bays.
North Pier; 53.8190°N 3.0591°W		II	1862–63	North Pier was built 1862–63 by Laidlaw and Sons from Glasgow, to a design by Eugenius Birch. The first of Blackpool's three piers to be built, it was known as The Blackpool Pier until the construction of Central Pier in 1868. It consists of a 1,405 feet (428 m) wooden deck supported by cast iron screw piles and columns. A jetty was added in 1874.
Promenade Shelters, Queen's Promenade; 53.8434°N 3.0544°W		II	Probably 1905	The new seafront promenades are depicted in two railway posters by Chesley Bonestell 1923 and Claude Buckle 1932
Promenade Shelters, South Shore; 53.8055°N 3.0558°W		II	Probably 1905	Probably built in 1905, this pair of promenade shelters sits on either side of the steps to the beach, opposite Trafalgar Road. They are constructed of cast iron with lead covered roofs and wooden partitions. They have iron columns at each corner, with ornamental brackets.
Raikes Hall; 53.8176°N 3.0403°W		II	Mid-18th century	Originally the home of the Hornby family, Raikes Hall was built in the mid-18th century and extended c. 1870. It was bought in 1871 by Raikes Hall Park, Gardens and Aquarium Company and became part of the pleasure gardens which was one of Blackpool's main tourist attractions until 1898. The house is constructed of stuccoed brick with stone dressings and quoins, and a slate hip roof. It has a semi-circular porch on fluted columns. As of 2010, Raikes Hall is a pub.
Regent Cinema; 53.8180°N 3.0460°W		II	1921	The cinema closed in 1971 and was later used as a bingo hall and snooker club. Refurbishment began in 2013 and in 2016 it was reopened as a cinema. It is in reinforced concrete, and has red brick walls faced with white glazed terracotta tiles. The building stands on a corner site, the canted corner bay containing an entrance with Doric columns and pilasters, and an entablature. Above this is a storey containing panels, and an octagonal tower with a domed roof. The Church Street front has two storeys and four bays, and contains in the upper storey a canted bay window and a portico with a pair of Ionic columns. The Regent Street front has seven bays, and is largely blank.
Salvation Army Citadel; 53.8182°N 3.0439°W		II	1905	This building was built 1904-05 as Raikes Road Technical School to a design by Potts, Son and Hennings. It was later the Grammar School and is currently the premises of the Salvation Army. It is constructed of red brick with grey terracotta dressings and quoins in the Baroque style. It has slate roofs, with copper domes. Its plan is U-shaped, with receding wings. The tower to the south-west is square with three storeys and has an octagonal lantern with a copper dome and finial.
Sundial at Bispham Parish Church; 53.8568°N 3.0368°W		II	1704	This sundial, 7 metres (23 ft) south of All Hallows Church, was made from the stone base of an ancient cross that had been brought into the churchyard. The dial, no longer present, was constructed in 1704 by John Hebblethwaite, and donated to the parish by John Hull. The stone shaft retains a motto, Die dies Truditur and the carved initials R.B., said to be of Robert Broadbelt, a 17th-century parish clerk.
Telephone Kiosks, Abingdon Street; 53.8188°N 3.0520°W		II	c. 1935	Located directly in front of the General Post Office, this group of eight K6 telephone kiosks was designed in 1935 by Giles Gilbert Scott. They are constructed of cast iron, with domed roofs, and are painted red. The K6 kiosks were designed by Scott to commemorate the Silver Jubilee of George V.
Telephone Kiosks, Talbot Square; 53.8192°N 3.0543°W		II	c. 1935	These three K6 telephone kiosks were designed in 1935 by Giles Gilbert Scott. They are constructed of cast iron and have domed roofs. The K6 kiosks were designed by Scott to commemorate the Silver Jubilee of George V.
Town Hall; 53.8187°N 3.0546°W		II	1895–1900	The town hall in Talbot Square was built 1895–1900 to a design by Potts, Son and Hennings. It is constructed from brick with stone dressings and slate roofs in the Jacobean style. Its façade is symmetrical, with five bays and terminating Dutch gables. The building has a U-shaped plan with a central square clock tower of two stages. The entrance hall has green and cream marble walls and mosaic floors. There is a statue of Queen Victoria dating from 1904.
Walkers Hill Farmhouse; 53.7916°N 3.0167°W		II	Last quarter of 18th century	This farmhouse was built in the last quarter of the 18th century. It is the only surviving 18th century cobble-built farmhouse in the district of Blackpool and has been modernised.
War Memorial; 53.8198°N 3.0560°W		II*	1923	This cenotaph is a white granite ashlar obelisk built in 1923, probably to a design by Grayson. It sits on a three-stepped plinth and on the north and south sides it has bronze relief panels that depict images of warfare. These were designed by Gilbert Ledward in 1922. On the east and west sides, figures of soldiers, a sailor and an airman are depicted. On platforms to the north and south of the obelisk are free-standing chest tombs with cast bronze roofs. On the roofs are names of the fallen.
White Tower Casino, Pleasure Beach; 53.7931°N 3.0559°W		II	1937–1940	Designed by Joseph Emberton for Leonard Thompson of the Pleasure Beach, in the International Modern style, the White Tower was built 1937–40 and restored and altered in 1972 and 1977–79. It is constructed of reinforced concrete and has a circular plan with long, curved window bands. It has a thin spiral tower on one side of the entrance, which adds, according to Nikolaus Pevsner, "an appropriate note of gaiety", and a lower rectangular tower on the other side.
Big Dipper, Pleasure Beach; 53.7892°N 3.0569°W		II	1923	A roller coaster ride designed by John A. Miller, it was built by Philadelphia Toboggan Coasters, and was modified in 1936 by Charlie Paige and Joseph Emberton. There are two trains, each of three cars, and each trains carries 24 passengers. The length of the ride is 3,300 feet (1,000 m) and its maximum height is 60 feet (18 m).
Blue Flyer, Pleasure Beach; 53.7902°N 3.0539°W		II	1934	A children's wooden roller coaster ride believed to have been designed by Charlie Paige. It was built by Philadelphia Toboggan Coasters, and was originally called Zipper Dipper. It consists of a single train of five cars that can carry 20 riders. The length of the ride is 1,099 feet (335 m).
Grand National, Pleasure Beach; 53.7919°N 3.0531°W		II	1935	A Moebius roller coaster ride designed by Charlie Paige, and built by Philadelphia Toboggan Coasters. It consists of two trains that travel simultaneously, each train consisting of three cars and carrying 18 people. The length of the ride is 3,302 feet (1,006 m), its maximum height is 62 feet (19 m), and its maximum speed is 40 miles per hour. In May 2004 its station was damaged by fire, and the ride reopened after repair in October 2004.
Sir Hiram Maxim's Captive Flying Machine, Pleasure Beach; 53.7921°N 3.0553°W		II	1904	A static ride designed by Hiram Maxim, and altered in 1934 by Joseph Emberton, it is the oldest static amusement ride in Britain, and the oldest fairground ride in continuous use in Europe. The ride consists of ten cars attached by booms to a central shaft which, when it rotates, lifts the cars by centrifugal force.
Noah's Ark, Pleasure Beach; 53.7925°N 3.0559°W		II	1922	A walk-through attraction with a rocking mechanism, designed by William H Strickler, and rebuilt in the same design in 1935. It consists of a boat containing models of animals, surrounded by a single-storey building intended to represent Mount Arafat. Inside are special effects including optical illusions and blown air or water. The attraction closed in 2008, but the boat continues to rock.

== See also ==
- Listed buildings in Lancashire
