= Arthur Hope =

Arthur Hope may refer to:

- Arthur Hope, 2nd Baron Rankeillour (1897–1958), British peer and politician
- Arthur John Hope (1875–1960), English architect
