= John Hassard =

British social scientist

John Hassard (born 1953 Manchester, UK) is a British social scientist specialising in organization theory. He is known for conducting a ‘multiple paradigm’ (multiple theory and method) case study investigation in organizational research.

== Education and honorary degree ==
Hassard received PhD in Organizational Behaviour from Aston University (1985). His thesis was Multiple paradigms and organisational research: an analysis of work behaviour in the fire service (1985). His postgraduate studies were sponsored by the Social Science Research Council. For research in organization theory, he was awarded an honorary doctorate (Doctor of Science) by Oulu University, Finland. In 2017 he was awarded a higher doctorate (Doctor of Letters) by the University of Manchester for research and publication in business and management.

== Career ==
Hassard was Visiting Fellow in Management Learning at Cambridge University and taught at the London Business School. He was head of the School of Management at Keele University and taught at the Cardiff University Business School. He is currently Professor of Organizational Analysis at the Manchester Business School, University of Manchester. Hassard conducted the seminar, "Managing the Past: The Role of Organisational Archives", at the Aston Business School in 2015.

Hassard was an equities trader on the Northern Stock Exchange before pursuing a career in organizational analysis.

== Research ==
Hassard's main research is in organisation theory and change. For the former, he researches critical and philosophical approaches to organisational analysis, notably contributing to debates on paradigms, labour processes, time, actor networks and post-modernism. For the latter, his work concerns management and organizational development in the manufacturing firm. This work often takes an international dimension, as with studies of enterprise restructuring in the Chinese state-owned steel industry and management reform in Japan, U.K. and U.S.A.

To fund these and other research investigations Hassard has received significant funding from the British Council, Economic and Social Research Council, Engineering and Physical Sciences Research Council, Department of Health, Department of Trade and Industry, and the United Nations.

Hassard received the 2012 "Article of the Year" award from the journal Human Relations for a study of the Hawthorne Investigations (1924–1932). He co-founded the Manchester Ethnography Network.

== Publications ==
John Hassard has published 20 books and more than 100 articles in refereed journals like the Academy of Management Review, British Journal of Industrial Relations, Human Relations, Industrial Relations, Journal of Management Studies and Organization Studies.

=== Author ===
- Inside the Compassionate Organization: Culture, Identity and Image in an English Hospice. Oxford: Oxford University Press (with Alan Baron, Fiona Cheetham and Sudi Sharifi)
- A New History of Management: Rewriting the Past and Imagining the Future. Cambridge: Cambridge University Press, fc. 2017 (with Todd Bridgman, Stephen Cummings, and Mick Rowlinson)
- Managing Modern Healthcare: Networks, Knowledge and Practice. London: Routledge, 2016 (with Michael Bresnen, Simon Bailey, Damian Hodgson and Paula Hyde)
- Deconstructing the Welfare State: Managing Healthcare in the Age of Reform. London: Routledge (fc. 2015) (with Ed Granter, Paula Hyde, and Leo McCann)
- Critical Leadership: Leader-Follower Dynamics in a Public Organization, London: Routledge, 2013 (with Paul Evans and Paula Hyde)
- Managing in the Modern Corporation: The Intensification of Managerial Work in the USA, UK and Japan. 2009, 2011, Cambridge: Cambridge University Press (with Leo McCann and Jonathan Morris)
- Disorganization Theory: Explorations in Alternative Organizational Analysis. London: Routledge, 2008 (with Mihaela Kelemen and Julie Wolfram Cox)
- China's State Enterprise Reform: From Marx to the Market. London: Routledge, 2007 (with Jackie Sheehan, Rose Zhou, Jane Terpstra-Tong and Jonathan Morris)
- Sociology and Organization Theory: Positivism, Paradigms and Postmodernity. Cambridge: Cambridge University Press, 1993, 1995
- Time, Work and Organization. London: Routledge. 1989 (with Paul Blyton, Stephen Hill and Kenneth Starkey)

=== Editor ===
- Routledge Companion to Organizational Change. London: Routledge, 2012, (with David Boje and Bernard Burnes)
- Contested Bodies. London: Routledge, 2001 (with Ruth Holliday)
- Body and Organization. London: Sage, 2000 (with Ruth Holliday and Hugh Willmott)
- Actor Network Theory and After. Oxford: Blackwell, 1999 (with John Law) ISBN 978-0-631-21194-5
- Organization/Representation: Work and Organizations in Popular Culture. London: Sage, 1998 (with Ruth Holliday)
- R and D Decisions: Strategy, Policy and Innovation. London: Routledge, 1996 (with Alice Belcher and Stephen Procter)
- Towards a New Theory of Organizations. London: Routledge, 1994 (with Martin Parker)
- Postmodernism and Organizations. London: Sage Publications, 1993 (with Martin Parker)
- The Theory and Philosophy of Organizations: Critical Issues and New Perspectives. London: Routledge, 1990, 1994 (with Denis Pym)
- The Sociology of Time. London: Macmillan, 1990 (Chinese translation published by Beijing Normal University Press, 2009)
