= John Bradshaw Gass =

Scottish architect and artist

John Bradshaw Gass (18 June 1855, Annan – 3 July 1939) was a Scottish architect and artist.

Hs was a nephew of J. J. Bradshaw, the founder of Bradshaw Gass & Hope, and received the Ashbury Prize for Civil Engineering at Owens College, later Manchester University. Gass assisted Sir Ernest George's London practice before becoming a pupil of his uncle at Bolton in 1880.

In 1882, when Gass became a partner, the firm adopted the style Bradshaw & Gass.

Like Sir Edwin Lutyens, another traditionalist and pupil of Ernest George, Gass designed country houses in period and vernacular styles.

From 1917 to 1925, Gass designed the Methodist College at Medak in Andhra Pradesh, which, like Lutyens' New Delhi work is organised, in the grand manner, around a central axis.

Gass was known as watercolour artist, first exhibiting his work at the Royal Academy in 1879. In later life he frequently travelled and filled more than twenty albums with sketches of North Africa and Asia.
