= Arthur John Hope =

British architect (1875–1960)

Arthur John Hope, known as "AJ" (1875–1960) was a British architect and president of the Manchester Society of Architects (1924).

A. J. Hope was born on 2 October 1875 Atherton in the historic county of Lancashire. He attended Wigan Grammar School and studied civil engineering at the Bolton School of Science and Art. Hope entered the office of Bradshaw & Gass as a pupil in 1892 and was made a partner ten years later creating Bradshaw, Gass & Hope (after 1912 Bradshaw Gass & Hope). Hope was admitted to the Royal Institute of British Architects as a licentiate in July 1911 after being proposed by his partner John Bradshaw Gass and Paul Ogden.

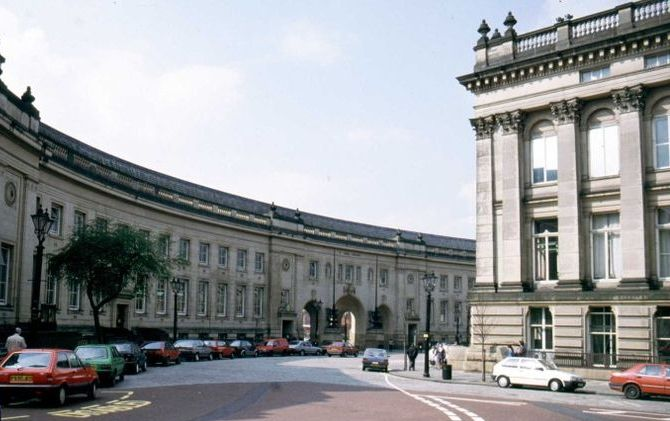
Bolton Town Hall extensions and Civic Centre, design conceived by A. J. Hope

Hope was respected as a building planner but was a poor draftsman and required a large number of assistants to interpret his ideas. By the 1930s, he was an intimidating figure dominating an office in which there was a strict hierarchy of professions. One of his interpreters was George Grenfell Baines whose work so impressed Hope he considered making him a partner. Hope was a traditionalist, favouring a severe classical style derived from the later Georgian architects, with a strong dislike of Modernism; under his direction Bradshaw Gass & Hope continued to produce neo-Georgian designs until the 1960s.

== See also ==
- Bradshaw Gass & Hope
