= Blackpool Racecourse =

Former racecourse in Lancashire, England

Blackpool Racecourse, also known as Clifton Park, was a horse racing venue in Blackpool, Lancashire.

It held England's first summer jumps race meeting, but though the owners had grand ambitions to capitalise on visitors to the town, it proved difficult to attract runners and the course closed shortly after the outbreak of the First World War.

== Location ==
The racecourse was built on a large expanse of flat ground at Squires Gate airfield in South Shore. It had previously hosted air shows, but these came to an end when permission for the course was granted.

== History ==
The first race meeting to be held in Blackpool had been a two-day flat meeting in the grounds of Layton Hall. This took place in late September 1865 and was repeated the following year, but permission for a permanent course was not granted until 1910.

This new course was to be for jump racing and was supported by prominent figures such as the Earl of Lonsdale. There were four shareholders in total, who brought in staff from Hurst Park to construct fences similar to the ones there. According to the West Lancashire Gazette the course was to be prepared "on a scale to compete with the highest class of steeplechase racing in France.” The architect was Robert Butcher Mather.

The first meeting took place on 1 August 1911, the first summer steeplechases ever held in England, and preceding the traditional opening of the jumps season at Newton Abbot. The first race was the Coronation Gold Cup. The organisers had hoped to attract the 1909 Grand National winner Lutteur III and the 1910 runner-up, Jerry M, but this did not happen. In the event, the opening race was won by a horse called Tokay, owned by a Mr J Langley. Despite the setback in terms of big name horses, the opening day crowd of 20,000 was the biggest seen at an event in the town since the previous year's aviation carnival.

Champion jockey Ernie Piggott rode a winner the following day in front of a slightly smaller crowd, and there was a similar attendance on the third day. The town's Gazette called the new venue "magnificent" and the meeting a “brilliant beginning.” The stylish attire of the attendees was said to outdo the Sunday morning parade on the North Pier.

The second meeting in September had a lower attendance, attributed to a railway strike preventing people arriving at nearby Squires Gate railway station. There were also smaller fields, including two walkovers and the Lytham Chase which had to be declared void after the two runners refused too many times.

The next meeting was in January 1912, followed by further ones in February, April and December, but all suffered similarly from small fields. The committee complained that management had wasted investment on disproportionately high prize money, which was consequently reduced, further exacerbating the shortage of entrants.

There were two further meetings in 1914, but the course was now in financial difficulty and receivers had already been appointed. The outbreak of war meant the September 1914 meeting was cancelled. Racing did return for three days in 1915, although one day only attracted 15 runners for six races. The final meeting took place on 26 April 1915.

== Facilities ==
The course's stands were state of the art, built of steel and concrete, and accommodated 25,000 people. The enclosures were sloped to maximise viewing. There was bright green and white palisading, fresh turf and banks of flowering plants. The facilities were admired, according to the local Gazette newspaper: The bar accommodation was described as "wonderful", and the sanitary arrangements as "excellent and good enough for anywhere."

== Layout ==
The course was a flat, left-handed oval, about a mile and a half round. It had a 60 ft wide steeplechase course and a 75 ft wide hurdle track. Rather grandiosly, it was marketed as “the English Auteuil”.

== Legacy ==
After the course closed, it was requisitioned by the military and used as a convalescent hospital, with a staff of 200 attending to up to 2,000 soldiers from the King's Lancashire Regiment.

The site returned to use as an airfield after the war, but the course grandstand remained and in 1950, the Stand Bar was used by the Blackpool & Fylde Glider Club. It decayed and fell down in 1960. After the Second World War, there was some discussion about bringing racing back and when Aintree’s future looked in jeopardy in the 1960s, Blackpool was suggested as a new home for the Grand National, but nothing came of it and the further expansion of Blackpool Airport on the land ended the possibility for good.

Horse racing did briefly return to the town when a trotting racecourse was developed at Highfield Road, opening on 6 April 1928, but this continued only into the early 1930s.
