= Regent Cinema, Blackpool =

Cinema in Blackpool, Lancashire, England

Regent Cinema
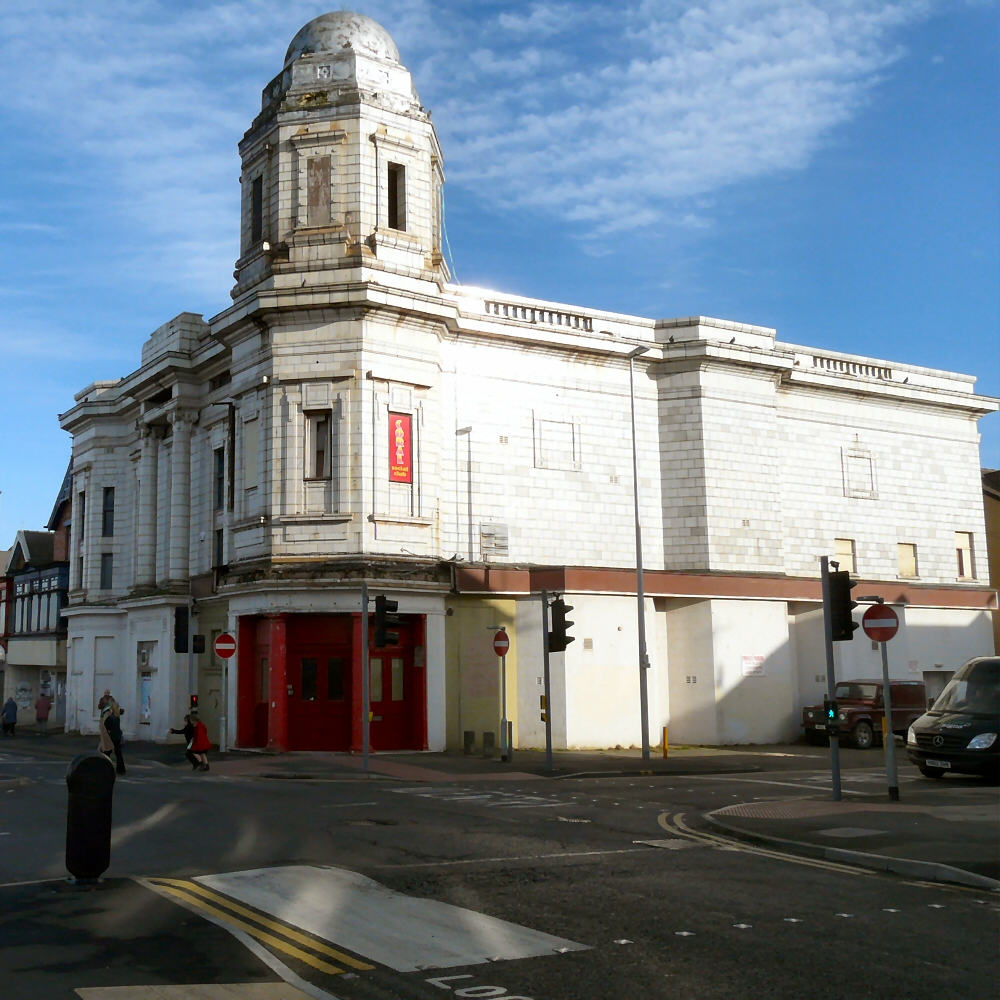

General information
- Location: Blackpool, Lancashire
- Address: 189 Church Street; Blackpool FY1 3NY
- Country: England
- Coordinates: 53°49′4.382″N 3°2′45.434″W grid reference SD 31241 36238
- Opened: 1921

Design and construction
- Architect(s): Lumb and Walton

Website
- theregentblackpool.co.uk

The Regent Cinema is a cinema in Blackpool, Lancashire, England, opened in 1921. From the 1970s it was a bingo hall; after renovation in the 2010s it re-opened as a cinema and antiques centre. It is a Grade II listed building.

== History and description ==
The cinema, originally named the Regent Picture House, was designed by Lumb and Walton, architects practicing in Blackpool, and opened on 17 January 1921, showing the film The Call of the Road. It seated 1,092, with 420 seats in the balcony and 42 in an upper balcony.

The building is in Neo-Baroque style, clad in white-glazed terracotta tiles. The listing text comments that it is "a good example of an Edwardian 'transitional' cinema of 1921". It is constructed of reinforced concrete; the beam of length 65 feet (20 m) supporting the floor of the balcony, making pillars unnecessary, was said to be the largest cast beam in the country at the time. The building was claimed to be the most fire-proof building in Blackpool. There was an elaborate ventilation system, which was claimed to be one of the most effective in any cinema at the time. There was a retractable roof in the centre of the auditorium ceiling, with glass panels, which were later replaced with grids. A well under the screen accommodated a five-piece orchestra, to accompany silent films; this was later altered when sound films arrived.

From 1969, bingo was held several nights a week, and it became a full time bingo club in 1971. It was acquired by Coral in 1973, and in later years there were several changes of ownership and changes of name. It was converted into a snooker hall in 2007.

=== Renovation ===
In 2012 the building was sold, and subsequently was renovated to bring it back to use as a cinema and venue for live performances. In 2014 it reopened as the Regent Antiques Centre. The building was given listed status, Grade II, by Historic England on 23 February 2016. It reopened as the Regent Cinema on 29 July of that year; it screens films on select days only, and the antiques centre is open daily.

== See also ==
- Listed buildings in Blackpool
