= Blue Flyer =

Roller coaster at Pleasure Beach Resort

- Previously known as Zipper Dipper (1934–2010)
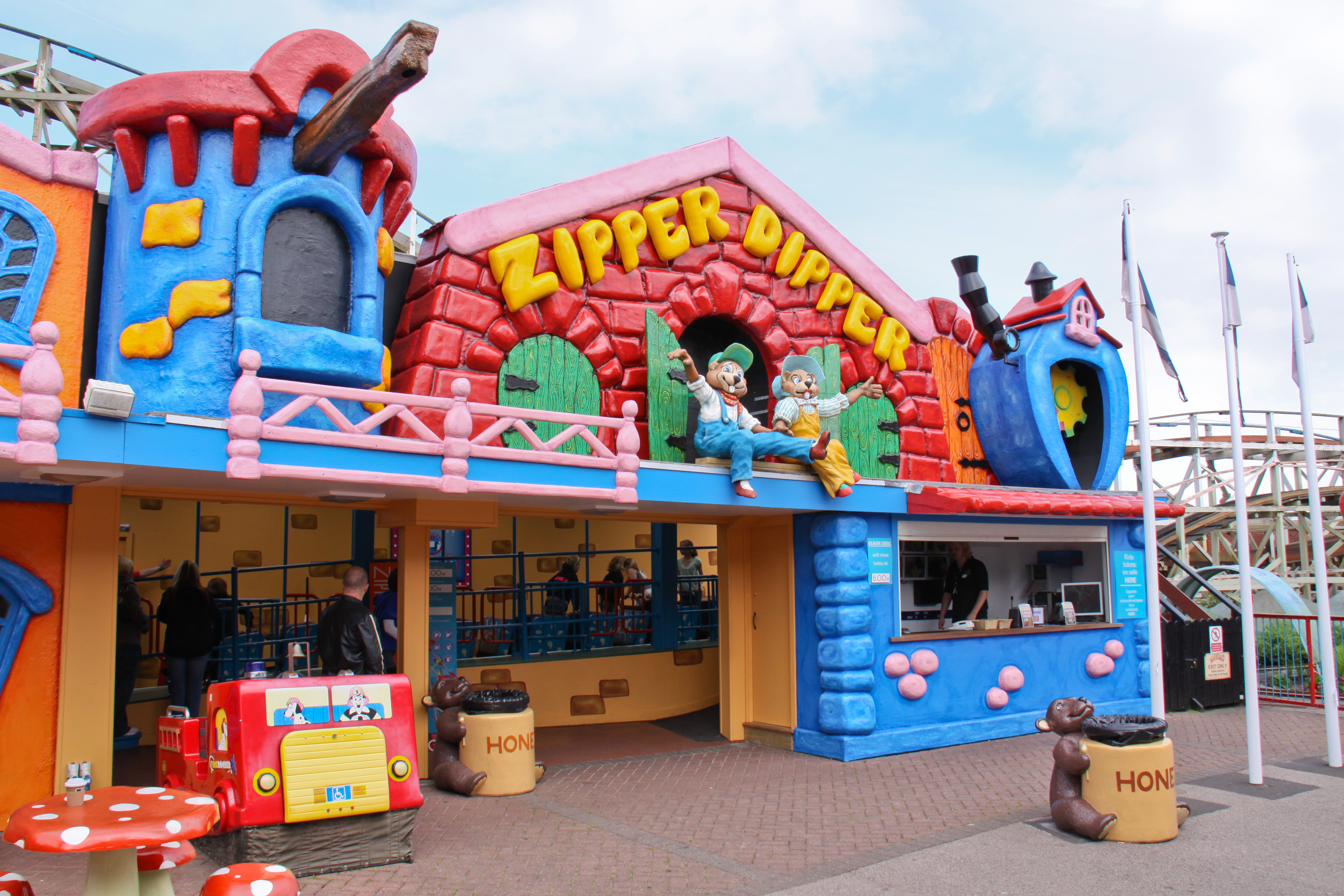

Pleasure Beach Resort
- Location: Pleasure Beach Resort
- Park section: Nickelodeon Land
- Coordinates: 53.790236°N 3.053884°W
- Status: Operating
- Opening date: 1934

General statistics
- Designer: Charles Paige
- Height: 15 ft (4.6 m)
- Inversions: 0
- Duration: 1:00
- Trains: Single train with 5 cars. Riders are arranged 2 across in 2 rows for a total of 20 riders per train.
- Blue Flyer at RCDB

Blue Flyer (formerly Zipper Dipper and Warburtons Milk Roll-A-Coaster) is a wooden roller coaster in the Nickelodeon Land section of Pleasure Beach Resort (better known as Blackpool Pleasure Beach) in Blackpool, England. It is believed to have been built by Charles Paige with assistance from Harry Traver. American Coaster Enthusiasts awarded the historic coaster its ACE Coaster Classic designation. Additionally, the ride was designated as a Grade II listed building on 19 April 2017.

== History ==
The ride originally opened in 1934 as Zipper Dipper. It retained this name until 2010, when Beaver Creek's Children Park, the section of the park the ride was located in, closed following the 2010 season. Zipper Dipper was rethemed and transformed into Blue Flyer with the opening of the new children's section, Nickelodeon Land, on 4 May 2011.

Blue Flyer was briefly sponsored by Warburtons, and was known as the Warburtons Milk Roll-A-Coaster during this time. All in-park signage still read "Zipper Dipper" for the duration of the sponsorship.

== Ride experience ==
Blue Flyer begins with a 4.6 meter (15 foot) lift hill, followed by a drop into three small hills and a tunnel, the latter of which is placed inside the building where Space Invader 2 was previously located. The train exits the tunnel and travels along a slight decline before entering the brake run and returning to the station. One ride cycle lasts approximately one minute.

Blue Flyer operates with one train, which was built by Philadelphia Toboggan Coasters. The train consists of five cars. Each car has two rows, each row seating two riders, for a total of 20 riders per train. The trains also feature buzz bars.

== See also ==
- Listed buildings in Blackpool

== Gallery ==
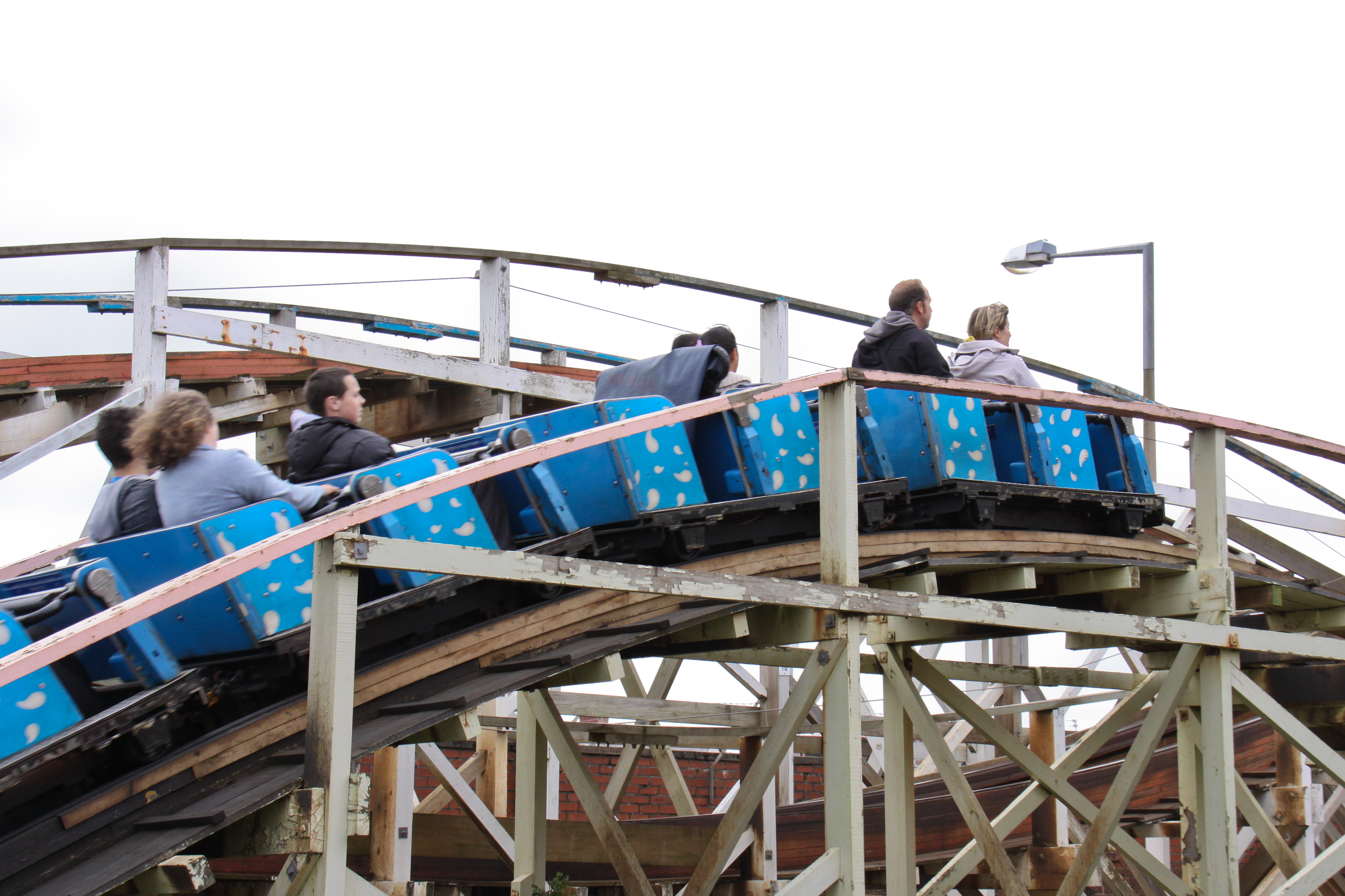
Train on track

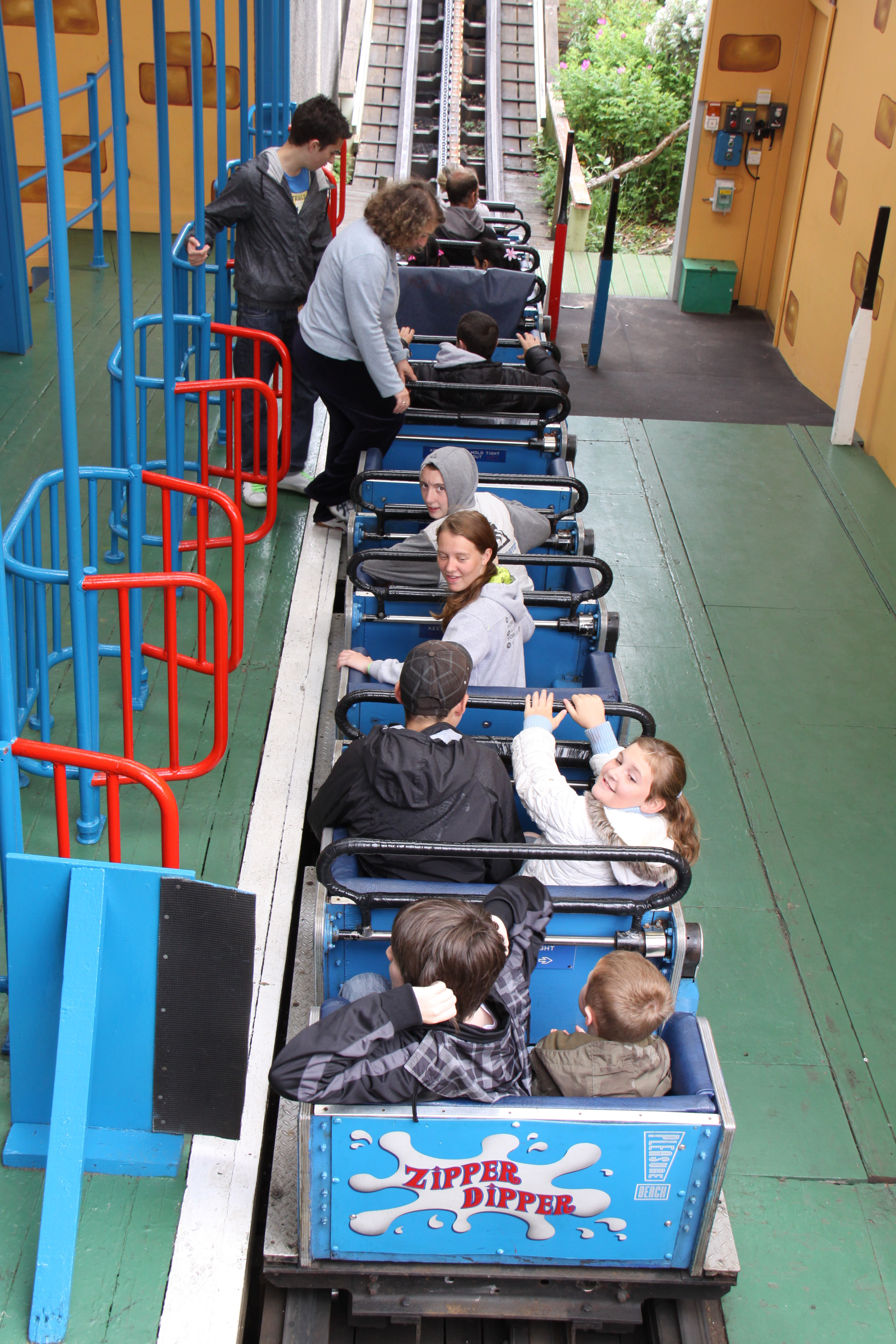
Train in station
