= Stock Exchange Hotel =

Hotel, formerly a stock exchange in Manchester, England

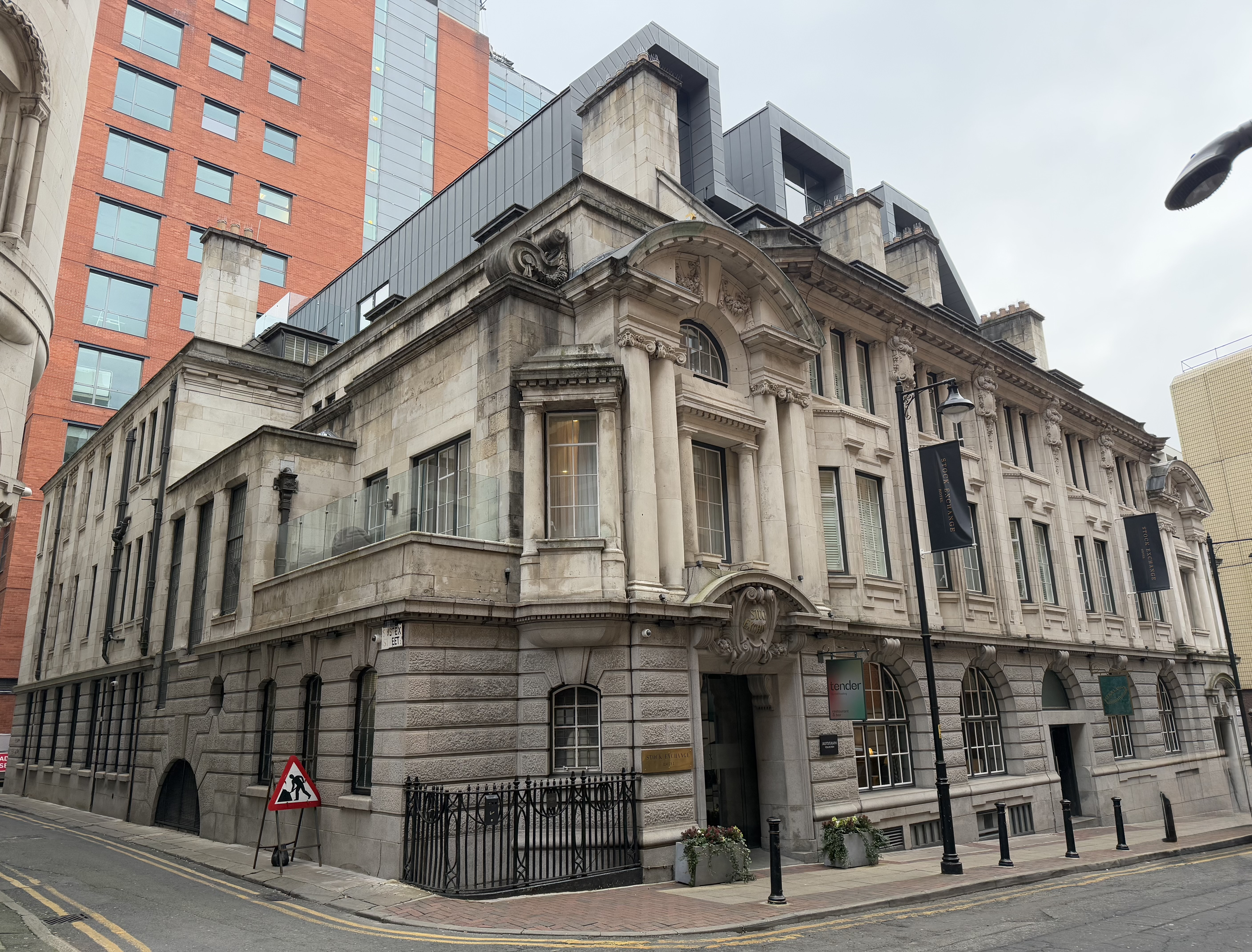
- Stock Exchange Hotel, February 2025

General information
- Architectural style: Edwardian Baroque
- Address: 2–6 Norfolk Street, Manchester, England
- Coordinates: 53.48201°N 2.24248°W
- Year(s) built: 1904–1906
- Cost: £86,000

Technical details
- Material: Portland stone
- Floor count: 3

Design and construction
- Architecture firm: Bradshaw, Gass and Hope
- Designations

Listed Building – Grade II
- Official name: Northern Stock Exchange
- Designated: 3 October 1974
- Reference no.: 1271383

Website
- www.stockexchangehotel.co.uk

The Manchester Stock Exchange, later a branch of the Northern Stock Exchange, is now a Grade II listed hotel located at 2–6 Norfolk Street, Manchester, England. It was built at a cost of £86,000, between 1904 and 1906 by Bradshaw, Gass and Hope, the Bolton architectural practice responsible for many of Manchester's iconic buildings.

== Description ==
A three-storey rectangular Edwardian Baroque building on an island site, the Manchester Stock Exchange is built in Portland stone. The ground floor displays the same channelled rock face rustication as at Stockport Central Library. There is a strong cornice and two further floors, with the central five bays having oriel windows surmounted by colonnaded windows. The end two bays are open pedimented with coupled columns, and the square headed doors feature carved shields in their pediments.

Pevsner described the interior as having "a magnificent hall with a dome supported at the corners by pilasters clad in sensuous green and cream marble".

== History ==
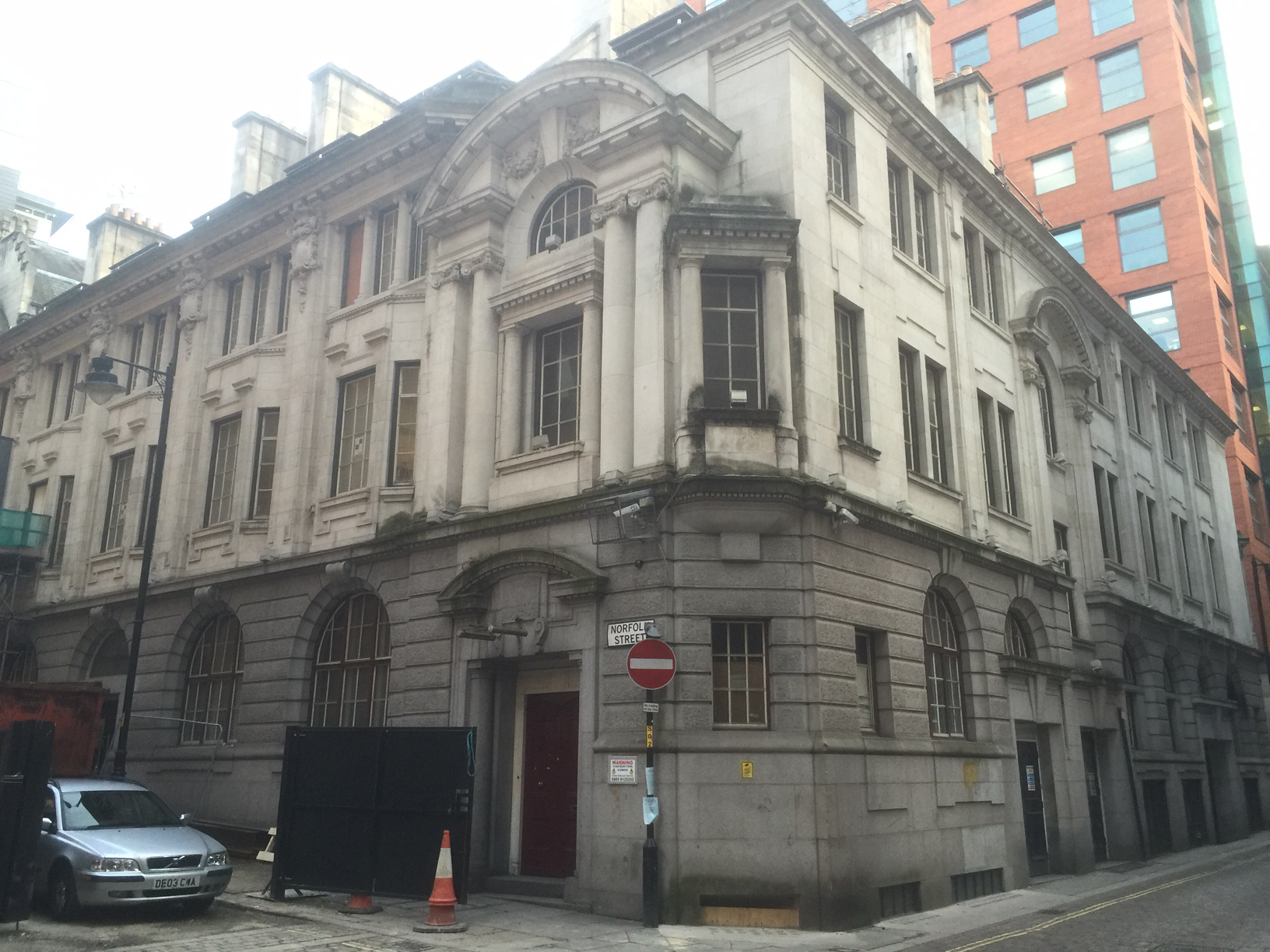
Manchester Stock Exchange during redevelopment, 2016

The first Manchester stock exchange opened in 1836, as a branch of the London Stock Exchange, to allow regional businesses to raise finance and trade those shares and bonds locally. The exchange listed railway companies as well as those involved in insurance, mining and manufacture, helping bring a "joint stock mania" to Manchester.

The thriving stock exchange was continually short of space and so this new building that reflected the confidence of the community was commissioned. Initially, trade in the new premises trebled and it became the busiest regional exchange for industrial stocks in the country.

Trading on the market was severely disrupted by the Wall Street crash of 1929 and eventually, as with other regional exchanges, its role became very much secondary to the capital market in London. In the 1960s it was reduced to being a branch of the Northern Stock Exchange, a grouping of fellow regional exchanges.

1973's merger of the Northern Stock Exchange and London Stock Exchange led to computerisation of the trading floor but shortly afterwards that was closed, the premises employed as offices.

The building became a restaurant then was bought for £1.5 million by former Manchester United footballers, Gary Neville and Ryan Giggs. They obtained planning permission to turn it into a 35-room hotel in 2015. A homeless activism group squatted the building site in 2015 and renamed it the "Sock Exchange" to publicise their provision of clothes to rough sleepers. Neville and Giggs gave the group their support and allowed them to stay in the uncompleted building over winter.
