= Miners' Convalescent Home =

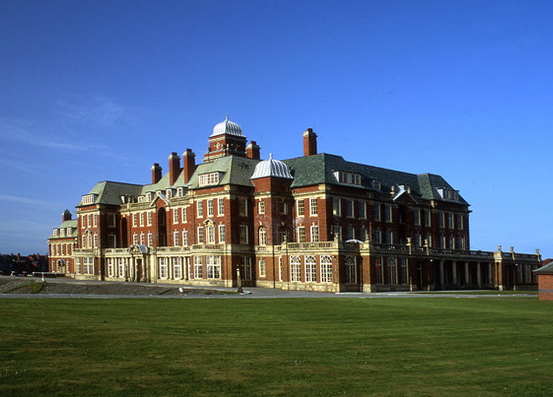
- Pictured in 1991

- Location within Blackpool
- 53.8453°N 3.0524°W
- Location: Blackpool, Lancashire, England

History
- Built: 1925–1927

Site notes
- Architect: Bradshaw Gass & Hope

Listed Building – Grade II
- Designated: 23 November 1995
- Reference no.: 1116645

The Miners' Convalescent Home was a convalescent home for miners in the seaside resort of Blackpool, Lancashire, England. It was built in 1925–1927 for Lancashire and Cheshire miners and was opened by Edward, Prince of Wales. In 1995, English Heritage designated the home a Grade II listed building.

The building was designed by Bolton architecture firm Bradshaw Gass & Hope in the Baroque Revival style. It has a symmetrical plan and is on three storeys. It is constructed of red brick with terracotta dressings; the hipped roofs are slate. The central bays are recessed between projecting wings. Towards the rear of the building there is a tower with an ogee cap.

The building continued to function as a convalescent home until the 1980s; in 2005 it was turned into apartments.

== See also ==
- Listed buildings in Blackpool
