= Robert Butcher Mather =

English mayor

Alderman Robert Butcher Mather JP

Mayor of Blackpool
- In office 8 November 1897 – 7 November 1998
- Preceded by: James Ward
- Succeeded by: Joseph Heap

Personal details
- Born: 1851 Blackpool, Lancashire
- Died: 27 July 1933 (aged 82) Blackpool, Lancashire
- Party: Conservative
- Spouse(s): Elizabeth Jane (m. 1875); Ellen (m. 1890)
- Children: 13

Alderman Robert Butcher Mather, JP (1851 – 27 July 1933), was a prominent figure in Blackpool, Lancashire, England in the late 19th and early 20th century. He was a member of the town council for many years, serving as mayor in 1897–98, and is recognised as one of the driving forces behind Blackpool's development into a major tourist resort town.

Mather was also an architect, surveyor, businessman, innkeeper and magistrate. He became one of the richest men in Blackpool; he was a director of several businesses and owned many properties in and around the town, including The New Inn and Central Hotel, where he lived with his family for many years.

In 1914, in recognition of his service to the Blackpool area, Mather was awarded the Freedom of the Borough.

== Family life ==
Mather was born at Anchor Cottage in South Shore, Blackpool in 1851. His father Robert was a schoolmaster turned innkeeper who had moved to Blackpool from Preesall in the 1940s to take up a position at Baines Endowed School in Marton. His mother was Ellen Salthouse, daughter of the landlord at the Clifton Arms in Little Marton. He had an elder brother, William Thomas, who was born in 1848. Mather was educated at Bamber's School in Blackpool.

The family moved to Poulton-le-Fylde as Mather's father became the licensee of the Black Bull Hotel, which he combined with work for Blackpool Local Board as a surveyor and collector; he would later be elected as a member of Blackpool's first town council, representing the Brunswick Ward. The family later moved into central Blackpool, to the New Inn next to Hounds Hill.

He was married to Elizabeth Jane Kay in 1875; they had five children, but only two survived more than a few years. Elizabeth died from tuberculosis in 1890. Later that year Mather was remarried, to Ellen Ireland; together they had eight children, two of whom died young. In 1896, the New Inn was demolished and rebuilt several yards back from the road in order to ease congestion; upon reopening, it was renamed the New Inn and Central Hotel. By the turn of the century, the family had moved to live at Courtfield on Hornby Road, a house designed by Mather himself.

Mather's two sons, Robert and William Bernard, both served in the army during World War I, after which they returned to become architects and surveyors in their father's business, renamed R. B. Mather, Sons and Wilding when they became partners, which continued until shortly after Mather's death in 1933.

Other than his firm of arctitects and surveyors, Mather's business interests included the Royal Hotel Company, the Blackpool Passenger Steamboat Company and the North Pier Company; he was also owner of the Clarence Hotel, and owner and licensee of the New Inn. He also built and owned a large number of commercial and residential properties in Blackpool, which included the creation of Mather Street in Layton. He was a devout Roman Catholic, known for his charitable donations, with the Church of the Sacred Heart on Talbot Road, Victoria Hospital, of which he was chairman of the board of management for many years, and the local Conservative Club being regular beneficiaries.

Mather died at his home on 27 July 1933, and was laid to rest in Layton cemetery. He was survived by Ellen and six of his children. The family remained at Courtfield until 1945, when the house was sold and converted into a hotel and catering college.

In his will, Mather left Queenstown Park to the people of Layton. In 1937, a marble altar was erected at Sacred Heart Church as a memorial.

== Politics ==
A conservative, Mather was first elected to Blackpool Town Council in November 1891; standing as an independent candidate, he defeated the incumbent Liberal representative, James Ward, by 15 votes. Having failed to get re-elected, he remained a member of the council as an alderman. He was appointed a justice of the peace for Lancashire in 1896, and for Blackpool from the formation of the Borough Bench in 1998. He was unanimously elected as Blackpool's mayor for the municipal year 1897–98.

As a councillor, Mather served on many committees, including as chairman of the Markets and Street Lighting Committee, and as a member of the Fylde Water Board. He was also instrumental in the formation of the Blackpool Borough Bench in 1898, and the establishment of a bankruptcy court.

Between 1897 and 1899, Mather was a councillor on Lancashire County Council, representing the electoral division of Blackpool.

In 1918, he was elected chairman of executive committee of the Blackpool Conservative Association. He was later chairman of the association.

== Architect and surveyor ==
Mather trained as an architect and surveyor in his brother's office. He later worked for Magee Marshall & Co, a brewery based in Bolton, during which time he designed many of their public houses in Blackpool. Having founded his own firm of architects and surveyors, his sons later became partners along with Fred Moxon Wilding; R. B. Mather, Sons and Wilding was dissolved several months after Mather's death.

=== Buildings ===
- Casino Building at Blackpool Pleasure Beach (1913, demolished in 1938)
- Blackpool United Hebrew Congregation synagogue, Leamington Road (1916–26)
- Public houses
  - The Victory, Caunce Street
  - Waterloo Hotel, Waterloo Road
  - King Edward VII Hotel, Chapel Street
- Queen's Hydro Hotel, South Shore
- Lancaster Bank
- Lancashire and Yorkshire Bank
- New wing at the Convent of the Holy Child Jesus, Layton
- Schools
  - St Cuthbert's Catholic School-Chapel, South Shore
  - Catholic Church School in Talbot Road
- Blackpool Aerodrome, South Shore (1910)
- Clifton Park Racecourse, South Shore (1911)
- Victoria Pier (now South Pier) arcade (1911)
