= Central Library, Blackpool =

Public library in Blackpool, Lancashire, England

Blackpool Central Library
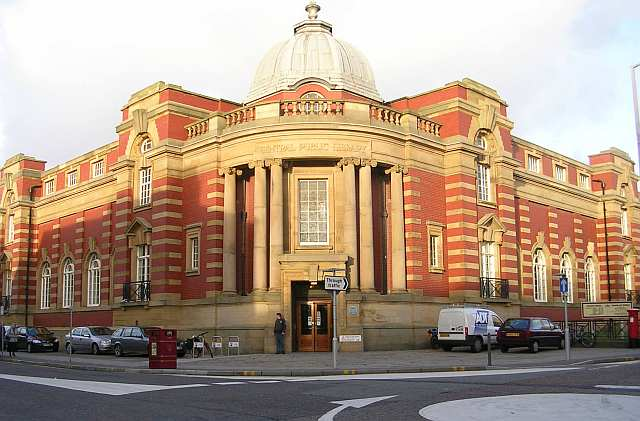
- Blackpool Central Library viewed from Queen Street

- Location within Blackpool

General information
- Location: Blackpool, United Kingdom
- Coordinates: 53.8206°N 3.0531°W
- Completed: 1911

Design and construction
- Architecture firm: Cullen, Lochhead and Brown

Listed Building – Grade II
- Official name: Central Library and Grundy Art Gallery
- Designated: 20 October 1983
- Reference no.: 1072014

Central Library is a public library in Blackpool, Lancashire, England, operated by the Blackpool Council.. The building that contains the library and the Grundy Art Gallery has been designated a Grade II listed building by English Heritage.

== History ==
=== Predecessors ===
A lending library and post office was established in Blackpool in 1788 by George Cook.

Blackpool Free Library was established in Blackpool in 1880. In January 1880 it was reported that premises had been secured in The Octagon Room in Talbot Road, and that the library was expected to open in April 1880 or earlier. 300 volumes had been presented or bought for the library. The Octagon Room was part of the Talbot Road Assembly Rooms, later Yates Wine Lodge, which was destroyed by fire in 2009.

Its first librarian, appointed in January 1880, was Hannah Eteson, the first woman to be appointed chief librarian of a public library in England. She was one of five shortlisted candidates from 170 applicants, with one other woman shortlisted, and it was noted that although some members of the appointing committee had initially been opposed to the appointment of a woman, she was "beyond doubt exceedingly well suited in several important particulars for the post". Eteson was "appointed at 18/- a week, with a little extra for cleaning." She was initially the only member of staff, but an assistant had been appointed by December 1881. The librarian's report for that month recorded 2,384 books issued for home reading; 3,708 adults and 117 children using the library; and 1,678 current tickets. In discussion over whether to raise the two women's salaries (from £1/week and 8 shillings/week respectively) it was noted that they worked up to fourteen hours a day.

Eteson resigned from her post in autumn 1891, ahead of her marriage. A columnist in The Fleetwood Chronicle noted that for eleven years she had "fulfilled the duties of chief librarian in a manner that has called forth praise not only from the Library Committee of the Corporation and the people of Blackpool but also from librarians of other towns as well as visitors", and that book losses had been lower than in other comparable libraries. The writer suggested that Eteson's deputy, Miss Lewtas, should be promoted to fill her place. In January 1892, as Mrs Bate-Jones, the former Miss Eteson was presented with a cheque for £20 by the chairman of the Library Committee, a testimonial raised in appreciation of her work and the "uniform courtesy and urbanity which always characterised the discharge of her duties". She was succeeded by her deputy, Kate Lewtas.

=== Central Library ===
In 1908, a site was picked for a new library and art gallery on Queen Street. It was partly financed by Bury artists Cuthbert and John Grundy. Construction started on the building in 1909, and it was completed in 1911. It was designed by Scottish architecture firm Cullen, Lochhead and Brown, who had won a competition for the project. In August 2010, the library closed to the public to undergo a year-long renovation that cost £3 million. It reopened on 26 September 2011. The library celebrated its centenary on 26 October 2011.

== Architecture ==
The library is in the Edwardian Baroque style. It is on two storeys and is constructed of red brick with stone dressings and striped pilasters. The library occupies the corner part of the building; the west and south walls have flanking pylons on plinths made of stone. The corner entrance is flanked by three ionic columns on each side. Over the doorway is a large, rectangular window, and above that, a frieze carved with the words "Central Public Library". At the top, there is an octagonal leaded dome, which has a finial shaped like an urn.

On 20 October 1983 the building that contains the library, and the adjacent Grundy Art Gallery, was designated a Grade II listed building by Historic England. The Grade II listing—the lowest of the three grades—is for buildings that are "nationally important and of special interest".

== Stained glass ==
As part of the centenary renovation of the building in 2011, eight new stained glass windows were commissioned. Designed by Nick Robertson with a brief from the staff of the library and input from library users which were made by Rainbow Glass Studios based in London.

== See also ==
- Listed buildings in Blackpool
- List of libraries in the United Kingdom
