= Stockport Central Library =

Library in Stockport, England

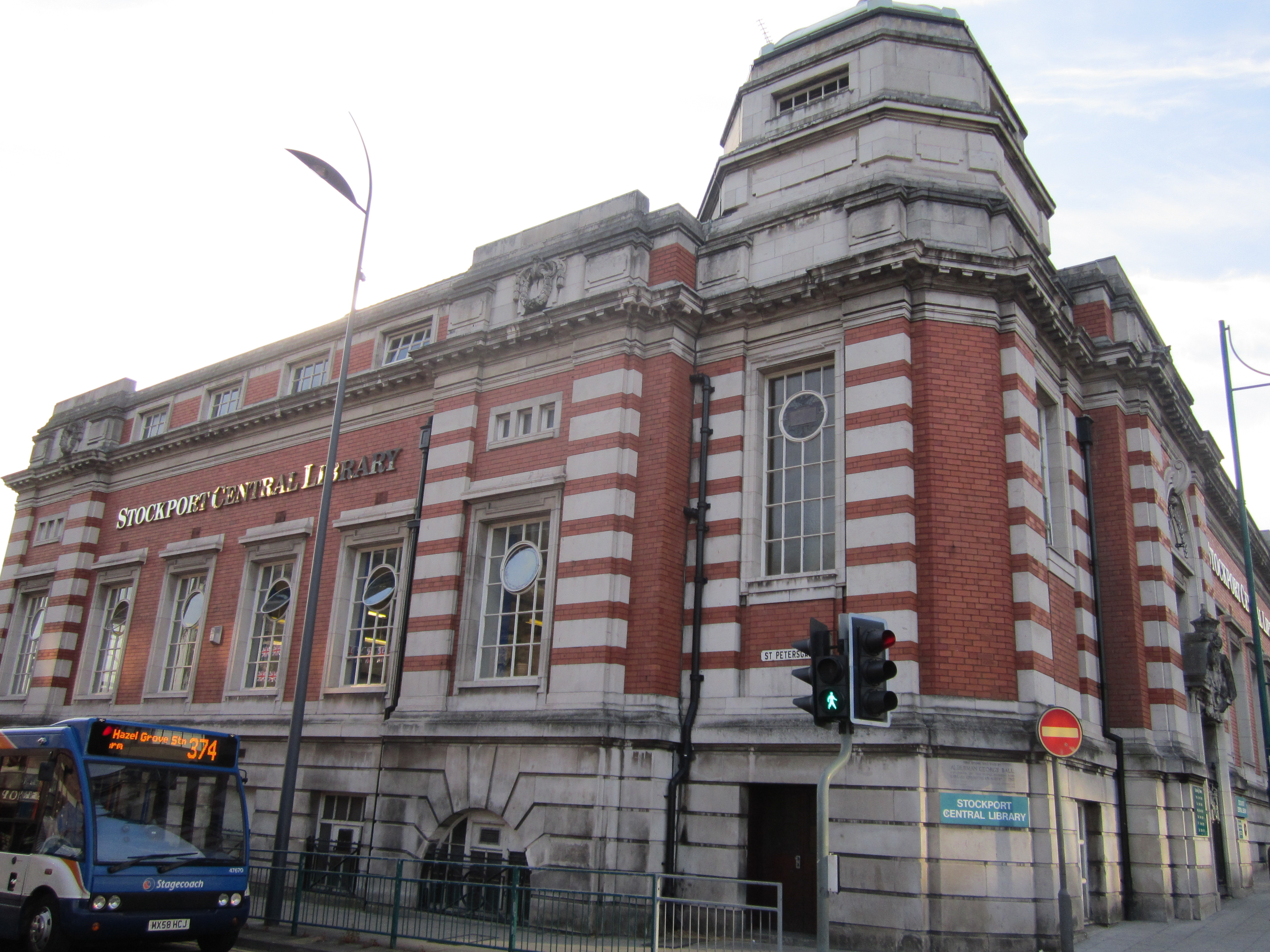
- The library in 2014
- Interactive map of the Stockport Central Library area

General information
- Architectural style: Edwardian Baroque
- Location: Wellington Road South, Stockport, Greater Manchester, England
- Coordinates: 53.40817°N 2.16061°W
- Year built: 1913–15
- Owner: Stockport Council

Technical details
- Material: Portland stone, red brick

Design and construction
- Architecture firm: Bradshaw Gass & Hope

Website
- Official website

Listed Building – Grade II
- Official name: Stockport Central Library
- Designated: 26 April 2017
- Reference no.: 1440524

Stockport Central Library is a Carnegie library in Stockport, Greater Manchester, England. It was built in 1913–1915 to designs by Bradshaw Gass & Hope in the Edwardian Baroque style. As of 2026 it has been closed indefinitely for renovations, and some of its functions moved to Stockroom.

== Location ==
It is situated on the corner of St Petersgate and Wellington Road South. The north south axis of the town had changed in 1826 with the opening of the new bridge and turnpike, the straight wide Wellington Roads. That relieved the 1724 turnpike that used Lancashire Hill, Lancashire Bridge, Great Underbank and Hillgate, of the Manchester to Derby through traffic. So in 1875 the market place and St Mary's Church had lost their prestige. New civic buildings were planned for Wellington Road South. The first building on the St Petersgate, Wellington Road South site was a mechanics' institute.

== History ==
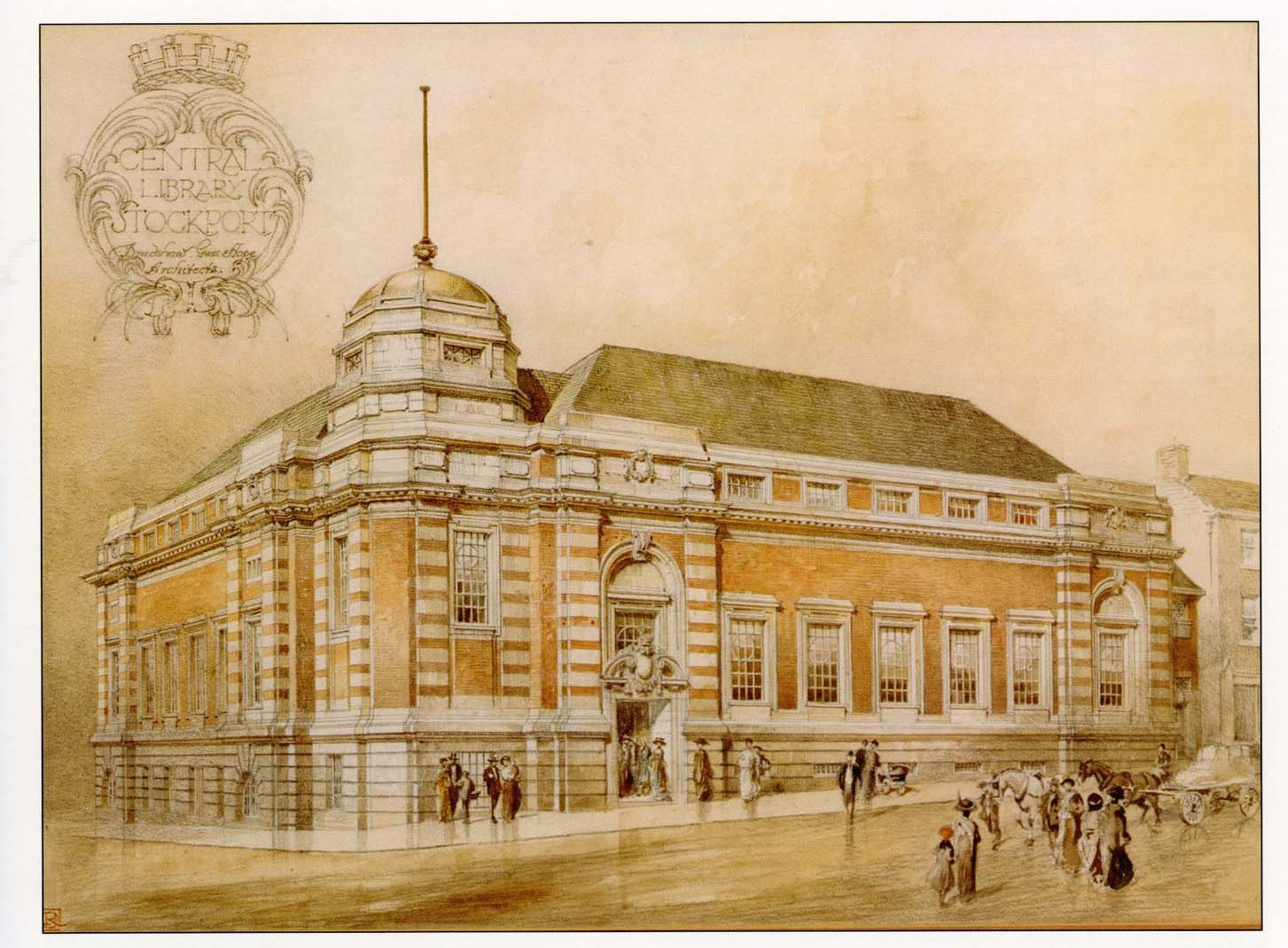
Stockport Central Library perspective drawing, 1911

The first relevant date for public libraries was 1850 when the Public Libraries Act 1850 gave municipal boroughs such as Stockport the power to fund public libraries. The first Stockport Library was opened in 1875 in the market over the cheese hall. This proved less than satisfactory, with an 1885 report stating "The ventilation of all the rooms is bad...There is not sufficient outlet for bad air which at certain times is overpowering. The air in the large reading room is particularly bad, being impregnated with the stench coming from the hall underneath". It was condemned in 1890 and replaced 23 years later.

In neighbouring Reddish, Houldsworth built baths, and a library for his workers in 1907.

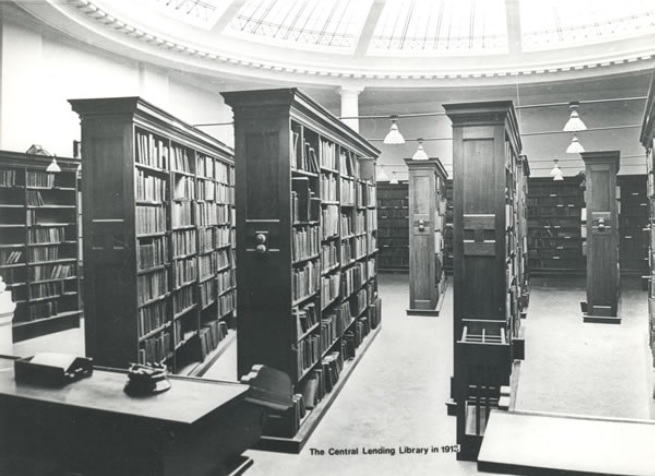
Interior – reference library. Archive shot from 1913

Stockport Central Library was built in 1913 with the assistance of Andrew Carnegie (1835–1919), an industrialist turned philanthropist. Carnegie was born in Scotland and emigrated to America with his family in 1848. His father was a weaver and his mother was a shoemaker's daughter. He worked in a cotton mill as a pirner (US: bobbin boy) then as an engine tenter, a telegraph messenger and operator. He also worked as a telegraph operator on the American railways and foreseeing future demand for iron and steel, he founded his own company in 1873, concentrating on steel. His companies prospered despite a depression and in 1901 were consolidated, and sold forming the United States Steel Corporation. With a personal fortune of $480 million, he endowed 2,509 libraries worldwide and 660 libraries in Britain.

Initially, Carnegie offered Stockport Corporation £10,000 for the erection of a free central library. The design was put out to competition and Bradshaw & Gass submitted a design costing £14,000. The Carnegie assessor, Percy S Worthington, awarded the 'premium' to them in October 1910. This was over budget, and Carnegie increased his offer to £15,000 on condition that the Corporation provided a further £2,000 to build a branch library in another part of the town.

Tenders were sought in September 1911, the full design drawings were supplied in 1913, and the building was completed in 1914. The final statement of accounts show it cost £15,000.10.6d.

== Building ==
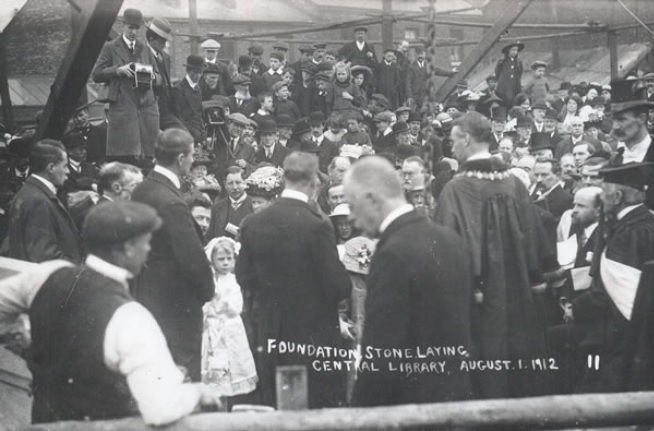
Foundation stone laying for Stockport Central Library, 1912

It was built by Bradshaw, Gass & Hope, one of a series of libraries built on the strength of their design for Bolton Library. The library is of red brick and Portland stone, in the Edwardian Baroque style complete with prominent corner dome with a tall finial. The entrance is offset by one bay along the Wellington Road South elevation. This too is flanked by banded brick pilasters, and surmounted by heavy stone carvings. This and a symmetrically matching bay has a tall arched window, cornice and cartouche in the frieze. In between is a five-window range with an attic storey with small windows. A rusticated basement takes advantage of the fall of the land; the elevation to St Petersgate is broadly similar to the Wellington Street South elevation but with basement windows.

The ground floor library has arcades and a glazed dome supported by Ionic columns, with stained glass windows with the names of writers. It has been locally listed, as Building 473.

== Facilities ==
As of 2015 it functioned as a reference library, a family history centre and a lending library six days a week on reduced hours, closing at 5.00pm on Wednesday and Thursday, and 4.00 on a Saturday but maintaining its service to 7.00pm on the other days.

== See also ==
- Listed buildings in Stockport
