= George Grenfell-Baines =

English architect and town planner

Sir George Grenfell-Baines
- Born: George Baines; 30 April 1908; Preston, Lancashire, England
- Died: 9 May 2003 (aged 95); Preston, Lancashire, England
- Citizenship: British
- Occupation: Architect
- Spouses: Dorothy Hodson (m. 1939; div. 1952); Milena Fleischmann (m. 1954)
- Children: One son Three daughters
- Practice: Building Design Partnership

Sir George Grenfell-Baines OBE DL FRIBA (born George Baines; 30 April 1908 – 9 May 2003) was an English architect and town planner. Born in Preston, his family's relatively humble circumstances - his father was a railway clerk - forced him to start work at the age of fourteen. Both George and his younger brother, Richard (Dick), were gifted mathematicians and draughtsmen. Grenfell-Baines left a secure, but limiting, job in the Lancashire County Architect's Office to work for the prestigious private firm of Bradshaw Gass & Hope in Bolton in 1930.

During the 1930s, Grenfell-Baines became aware of Modernism, particularly the work of Le Corbusier and Gropius, through the architectural press and was determined to practise it himself. He studied at Manchester University for two years from 1934. It was at this time he adopted the name George Grenfell Baines at the suggestion of fellow student Gerald Hayforthwaite. Later this was hyphenated as Grenfell-Baines: Grenfell being his mother's maiden name. He was known to friends and colleagues as "GG".

In 1935, he was awarded the Heywood prize for the design of reinforced concrete flats. The following year he was awarded the third prize in a competition for a new Rhodesian Parliament; the prize money, £250, was enough to enable him to start his own practice, which later became Grenfell Baines Group (laterly called Grenfell-Baines Hargreaves). Grenfell-Baines's work for the Air Ministry during World War II brought him to the attention of Anthony Chitty and the London Modernists. Although Grenfell-Baines always chose to be based in Preston, he cultivated friendships in national and international circles. In 1951, he was invited to design a pavilion for the Festival of Britain. Grenfell-Baines's post-war work included the New Towns of Newton Aycliffe (planned 1947) and Peterlee (planned 1948). His design for HJ Heinz offices in Cardiff in 1960 won him the National Eisteddfod Gold Medal for Architecture.

An abiding interest for GG was multidisciplinary working. His highly successful firm BDP (Building Design Partnership), which he set up in Preston in 1961, was the result of numerous experiments in management structure. In 1972, he became professor of Architecture at Sheffield University where he founded the Design Teaching Partnership. He officially retired in 1974 but continued working as a consultant into his final decade.

He received an OBE in 1960 and was knighted in 1978.

Grenfell-Baines was survived by his second wife, Lady Milena Grenfell-Baines (b Milena Fleischmann), whom he married in 1954, their son and daughter, and the two daughters of his first marriage, to Dorothy Hodson. Milena was a Czechoslovak refugee of the Kindertransport.

National Life Stories conducted an oral history interview (C467/46) with George Grenfell-Baines in 2000 for its Architects Lives' collection held by the British Library.
