= Blackpool United Hebrew Congregation =

Former Orthodox synagogue in Blackpool, England

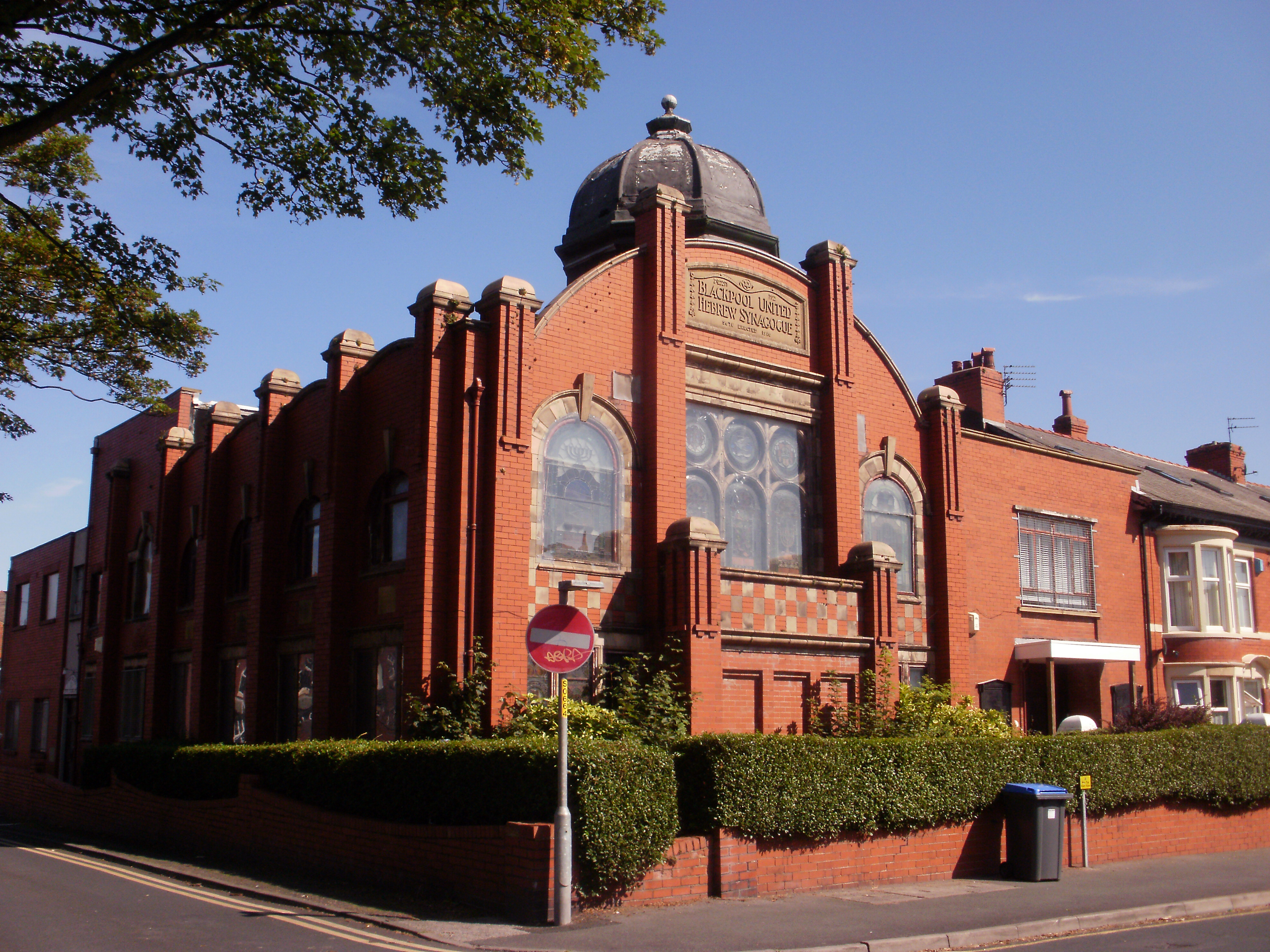
- The former synagogue, in 2010

- Location of the former synagogue in Blackpool

Religion
- Affiliation: Orthodox Judaism (former)
- Rite: Nusach Ashkenaz
- Ecclesiastical or organisational status: Synagogue (1926–2012)
- Status: Closed (as a synagogue)

Location
- Location: Leamington Road, Blackpool, Lancashire, England
- Country: United Kingdom
- Coordinates: 53°49′04″N 3°02′36″W

Architecture
- Architect: Robert Butcher Mather
- Type: Synagogue architecture
- Style: Byzantine Revival
- Established: 1907 (as a congregation)
- Groundbreaking: 1916
- Completed: 1926

Listed Building – Grade II
- Official name: Synagogue
- Designated: 27 August 1998
- Reference no.: 1376196

The Blackpool United Hebrew Congregation is a former Orthodox Jewish congregation and synagogue, located on Leamington Road, Blackpool, Lancashire, England, in the United Kingdom. The congregation worshiped in the Ashkenazi rite. The former synagogue building was listed as a Grade II building in 1998.

== History ==
The Blackpool United Hebrew Congregation was founded in about 1907 with the merger of Blackpool Hebrew Congregation which had been founded in 1898 and Blackpool New Orthodox Hebrew Congregation (founded in 1905). The synagogue was originally located in Springfield Road, North Shore. The synagogue in Leamington Road was consecrated in 1916.

It was a provincial synagogue under the aegis of the Chief Rabbi of the United Kingdom.

The synagogue building, designed by Blackpool alderman and justice of the peace Robert Butcher Mather in the Byzantine Revival style, is Grade II listed It was built between 1916 and 1926 and was later altered in 1955 and 1976.

On 8 February 2009, the synagogue hosted a visit by Jonathan Sacks, the Chief Rabbi of the United Hebrew Congregations of the United Kingdom. The visit was arranged by Eric Moonman, the president of the Zionist Federation of Great Britain and Ireland.

The synagogue closed in May 2012, as the community numbers had fallen below a viable congregation. The last service, conducted by Cantor Stephen Robins ARCM, was held on 13 May 2012 accompanied by the Shabbaton Choir. The synagogue was packed for the occasion with many former members and children and grandchildren of congregants from previous years attending. The sermon was given by Rabbi Arnold Saunders of Manchester, a previous Minister.

The last Minister of the synagogue was Rabbi David Braunold who assumed the pulpit in 1985 and departed for the St Anne's Hebrew Congregation in 2010. Rabbi Braunold gave the welcoming address at the last service.

The community merged with the one in St Annes. The building was sold in 2012, and again in 2019.

== See also ==
- History of the Jews in England
- List of former synagogues in the United Kingdom
