= Bradshaw Gass & Hope =

Architectural practice in Bolton, England

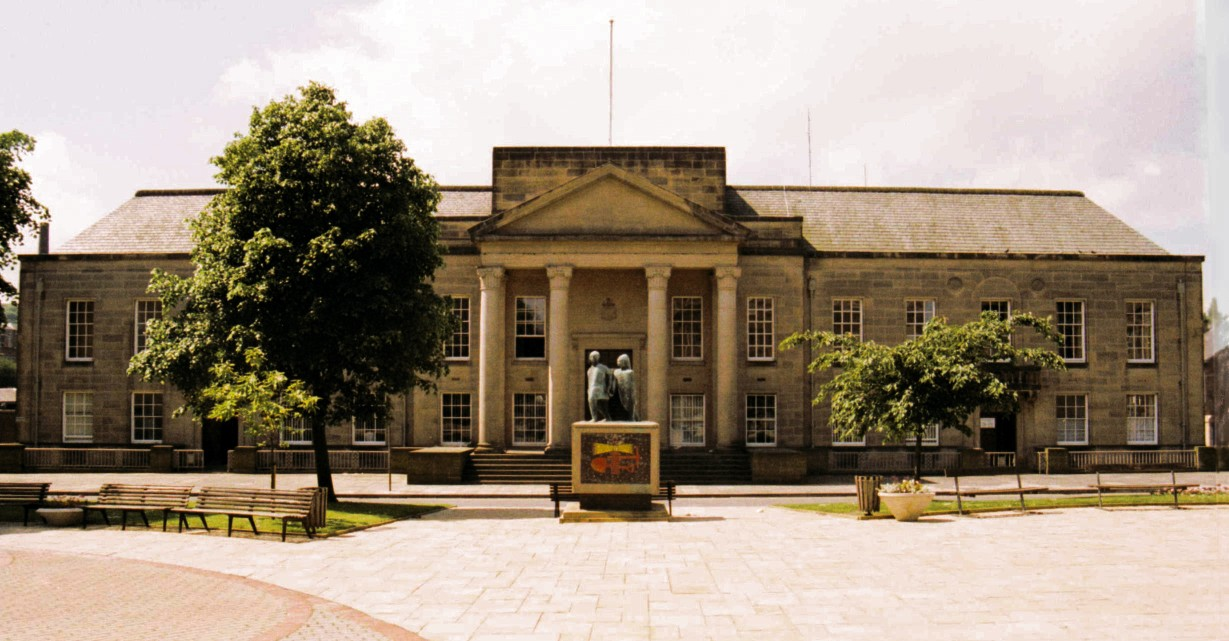
Burnley Police Station and Magistrates Court, built 1951–55

Bradshaw Gass & Hope is an English architectural practice founded in 1862 by Jonas James Bradshaw (c. 1837–1912). It is Bolton's oldest architectural practice and has exhibited archive drawings in London and Manchester. The style "Bradshaw Gass & Hope" was adopted after Bradshaw's death to incorporate the names of the remaining partners, John Bradshaw Gass and Arthur John Hope. As of 2022, the firm continues to operate from offices in Bolton.

== History ==
Jonas James Bradshaw first opened an office on Nelson Square, Bolton in 1862, then moved to 19 Silverwell Street in 1871. His nephew John Bradshaw Gass joined him in 1882 and Arthur John Hope was articled to the firm in 1892, becoming a partner in 1902.

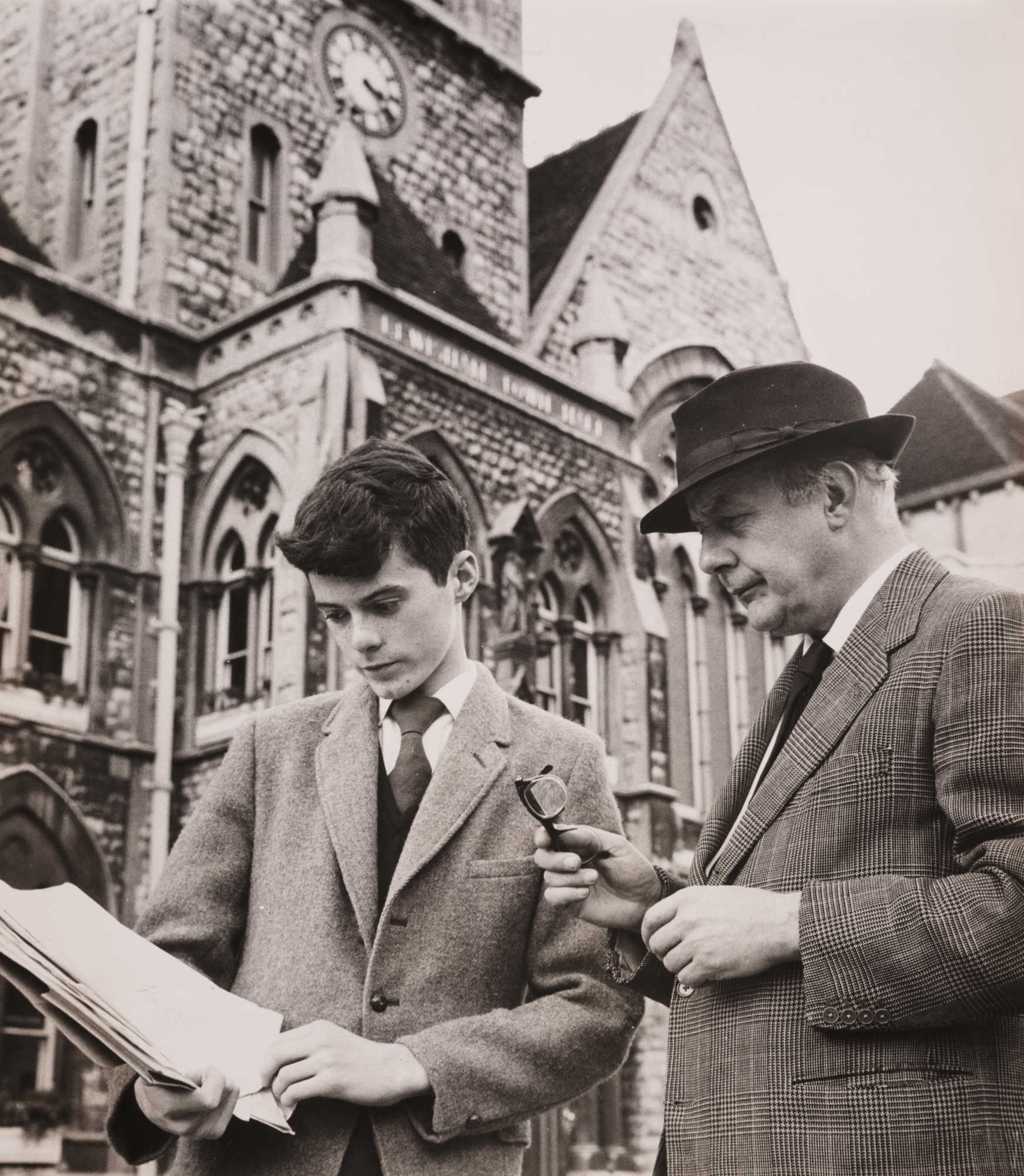
John Betjeman reads William Norton's Petition to Save Lewisham Town Hall, 1961

Although Bradshaw was capable of designing fine Gothic Revival houses, like Watermillock (1880–1886), he mainly produced industrial buildings. The technical challenges of early iron and concrete framed factories led Bradshaw to employ structural engineers and quantity surveyors and he thus founded one of the first multidisciplinary practices. The emphasis on engineering in the practice benefited John Parkinson, Bradshaw's apprentice from 1877 to 1882, who later designed high-rise buildings including Los Angeles City Hall.

From 1902 until 1912, the practice included a comma in its name.

In the early 20th century, Bradshaw Gass & Hope achieved national prominence, winning several architectural competitions and commissions to build seven town halls between 1928 and 1939. During the period, Bradshaw Gass & Hope attracted many architecture students, several of whom went on to head council architects departments.

Until the 1960s most of the firm's work was in the Classical idiom.

Sir George Grenfell-Baines, the founder of Building Design Partnership, worked for the practice from 1930 to 1934 He was impressed by its multidisciplinary nature but dismayed by the then strictly hierarchical structure.

== Work ==
The firm's work includes:

=== Jonas James Bradshaw with Leigh Hall ===
- Eaves Lane Workhouse, now hospital, Chorley (1869–1872)

=== J J Bradshaw ===
- Clitheroe Workhouse, now hospital (1870)
- Greenthorne, Edgworth (1880)
- Spinners' Hall, Bolton (1880 and later enlargements)
- Watermillock, Bolton (1880–1886)

=== Bradshaw and Gass ===
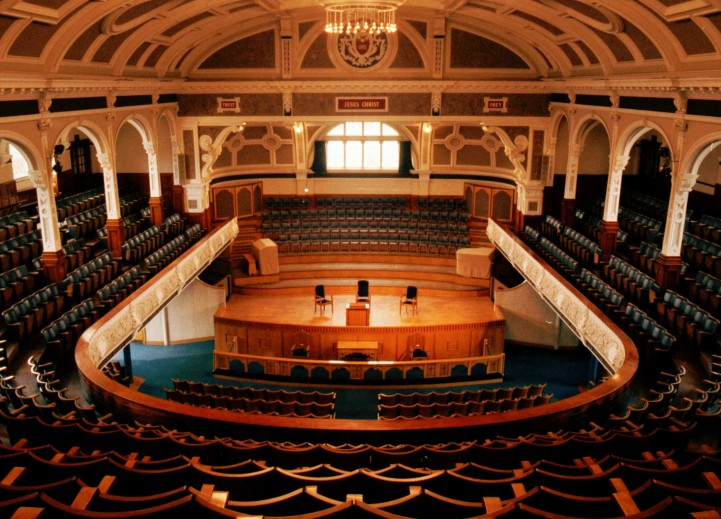
Victoria Hall, Bolton

- Mather Lane Mill, Leigh (1882)
- Rutland Mills, Adelaide Street, Bolton (1883–1920)
- Lincoln Mill, Washington Street, Bolton (1883–1920)
- Bolton Evening News offices (1890–1907)
- Victoria Hall, Bolton (1898–1900)
- College of Art, Hilden Street, Bolton (1901–1903)
- Leysian Mission, now Imperial Hall, City Road (1901–1906)
- Grand Central Hall, Liverpool (1905)

=== Bradshaw, Gass and Hope ===
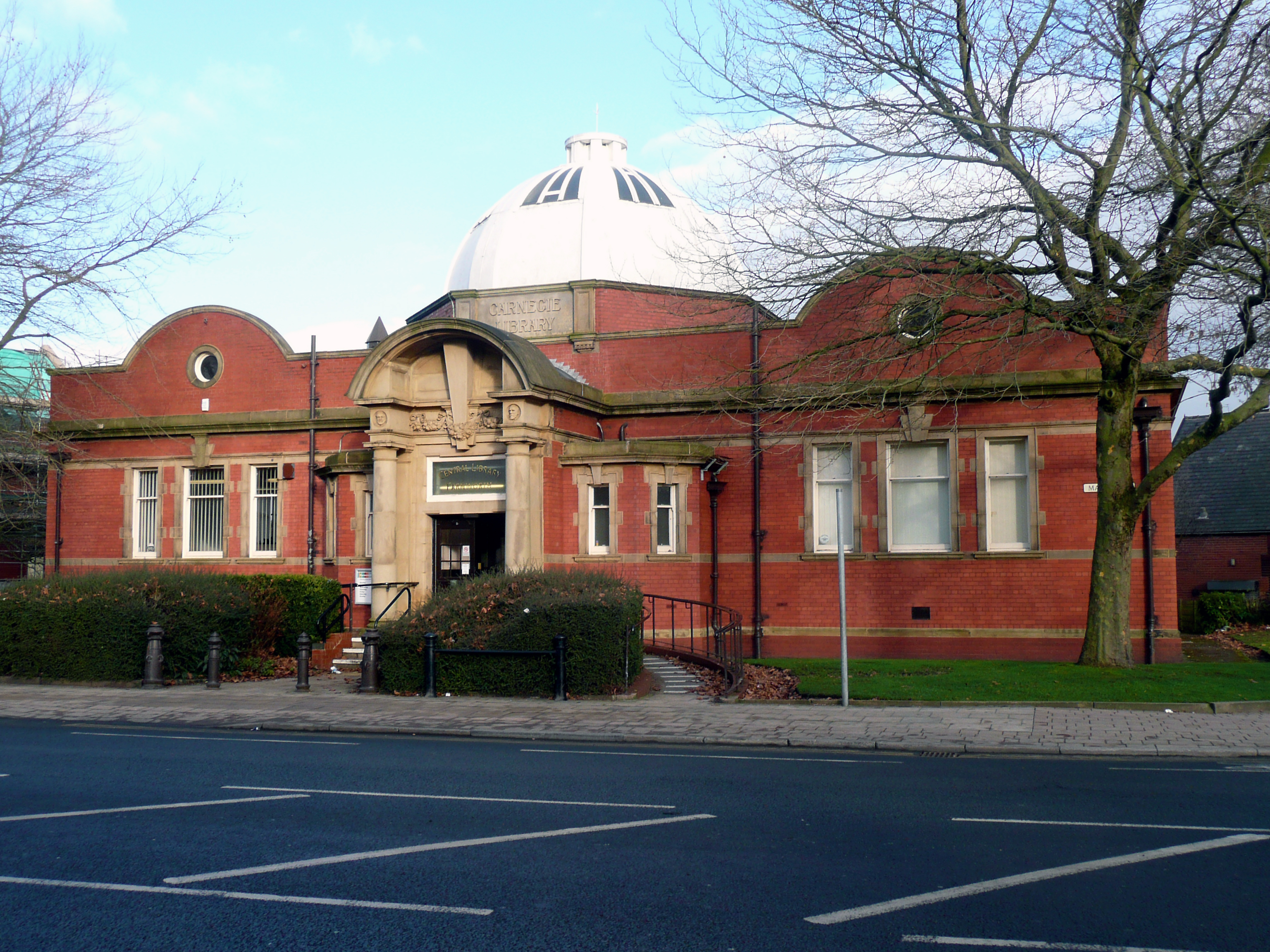
Farnworth Library

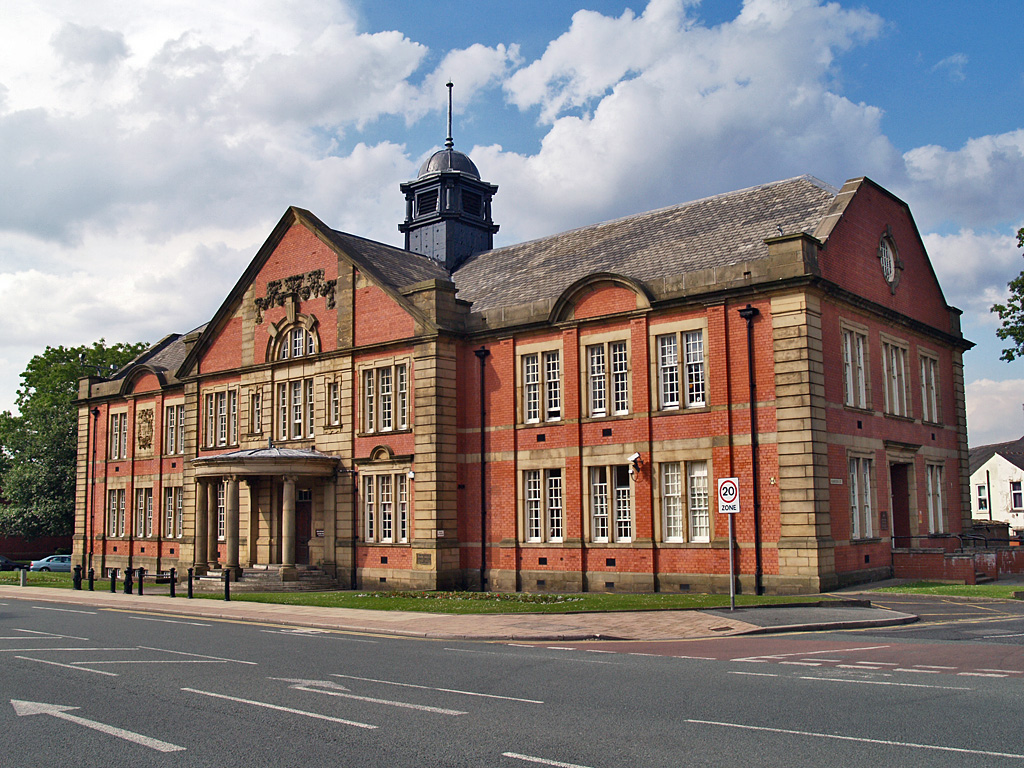
Farnworth Town Hall

- Leysian Wesleyan Mission, Finsbury (1902–1904)
- Westhoughton Town Hall (1903–1904)
- Manchester Stock Exchange (1904–1906)
- Carnegie Library, Atherton (1904–1905)
- Baptist Church, Market Street, Farnworth (1906)
- Tollard Royal Hotel, Southampton Row (1907)
- Queen's Hall Methodist Mission, Market Street, Wigan (1907–1908)
- Croal Mill, Callis Road, Bolton (1908)
- Astley Bridge Carnegie Branch Library (1909–1912)
- Farnworth Town Hall and Carnegie Library (1909–1911)
- Great Lever Branch Carnegie Library (1909–1912)
- Stockport Central Carnegie Library (1912–1913)
- Leigh Spinners (1913)

=== Bradshaw Gass and Hope ===
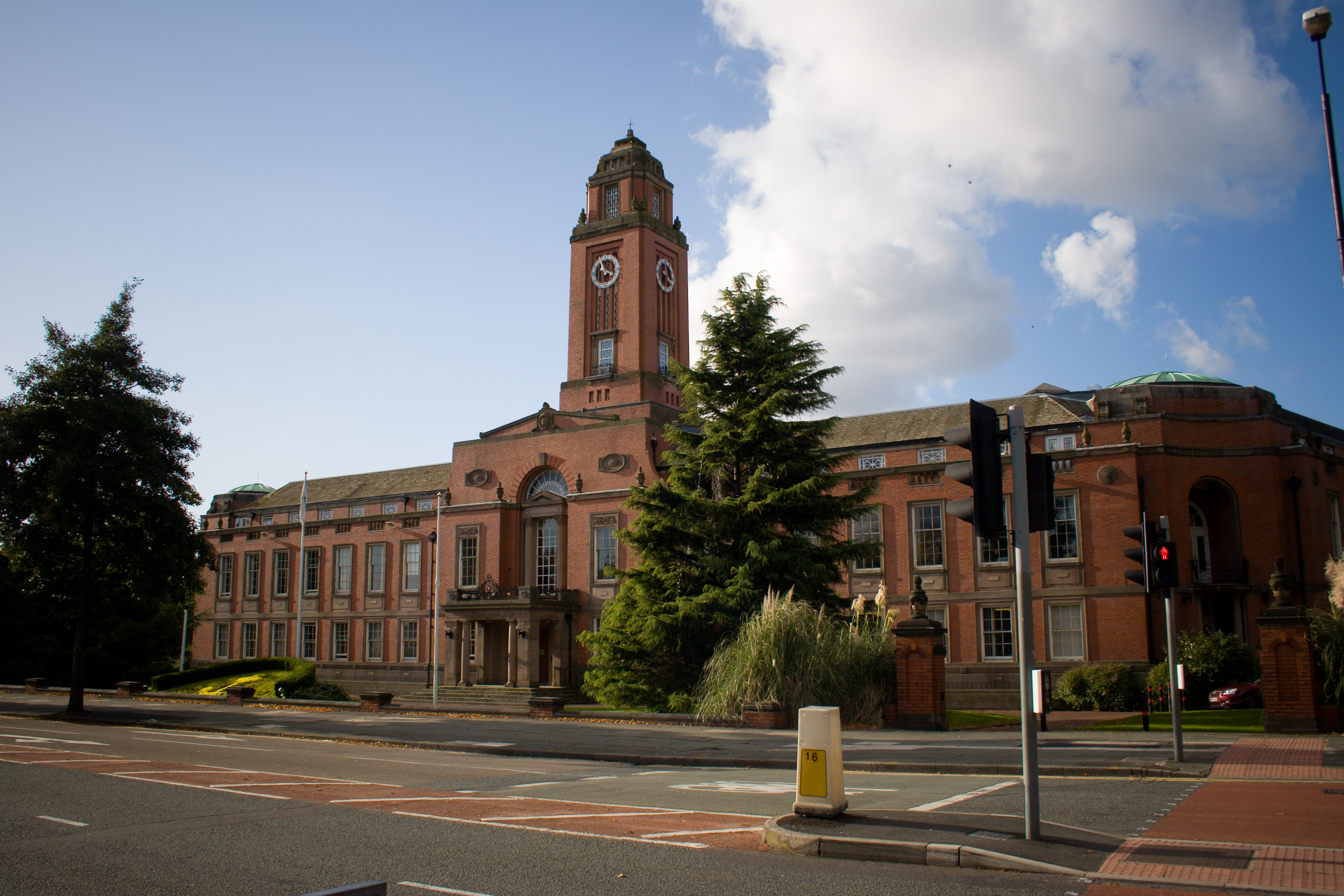
Trafford Town Hall

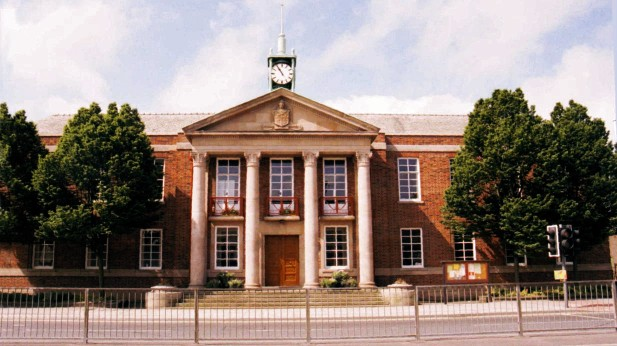
Padiham Town Hall

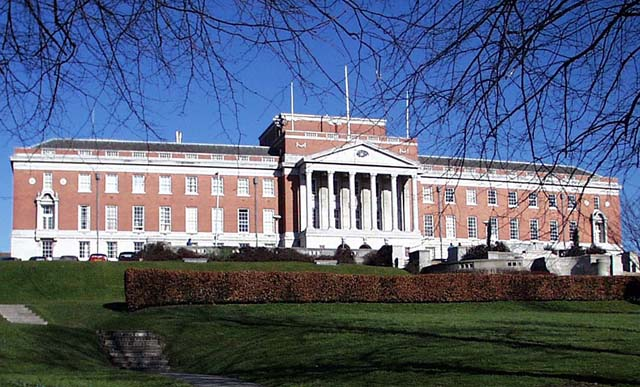
Chesterfield Town Hall

- Miners Hall, Bolton (1913–1914)
- Royal Exchange, Manchester (1914–1921)
- Workshops for the Blind, Marsden Road, Bolton (1914)
- Methodist College, Medak (1917–1925)
- Astley Bridge Mill, (1920–1927)
- Miners' Convalescent Home, Blackpool (1925–1927)
- UMIST, Manchester (1927–1957)
- War Memorial, Bolton (1928)
- Co-Op, Victoria Square, Bolton (1928)
- Lewisham Town Hall (1928–1932)
- Leith Theatre and Library (1929–1931)
- Bolton Town Hall extensions and Civic Centre (1930–1939)
- Wimbledon Town Hall (1931)
- Trafford Town Hall (1932–1933)
- Boothstown Mines Rescue Station (1933)
- Luton Town Hall (1934–1938)
- Chesterfield Town Hall (1937–1938)
- Padiham Town Hall (1938)
- Turton High School, Bromley Cross (1939–1953)
- Completion of Bolton School (1945–1965)
- Police Station and Magistrates Court, Burnley (1951–1955)
- Police Headquarters, Salford (1958)
- Methodist Chapel, Halliwell (1959)
- ICI-Alkali Division Headquarters, Winnington, Northwich (1959–1960)
- Girls School, Broughton (1962)
- Municipal Offices, Newcastle-under-Lyme (1963)
- Offices for Jeyes, Thetford (1970)
- Bolton Arena (1999–2001)

== Alumni ==
=== Partners ===
- John Jonas Bradshaw (c. 1837–1912)
- John Bradshaw Gass (1855–1939)
- Arthur John Hope (1875–1969)
- James Robert Adamson (1883–1943)
- Robert Mackison McNaught (1898–1969)

=== Others ===
- John Parkinson (1861–1935), architect
- Sir George Grenfell-Baines (1908–2003), founder of Building Design Partnership
