= Grundy Art Gallery =

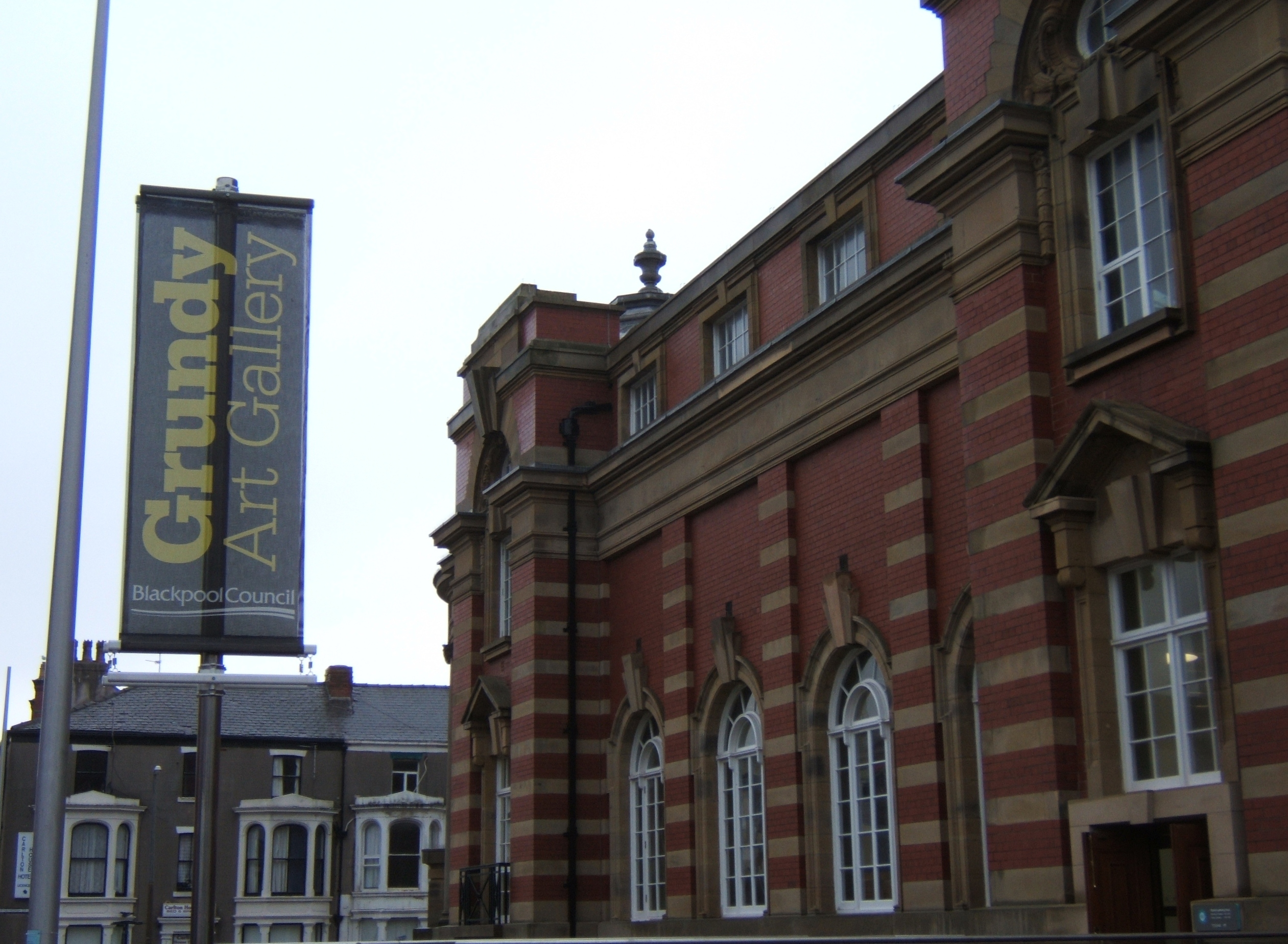
- Grundy Art Gallery with signpost

- Grundy Art Gallery within Blackpool
- Established: 26 October 1911
- Location: Queen Street, Blackpool, Lancashire, England
- Coordinates: 53.8204°N 3.0525°W
- Type: Art museum
- Curator: Paulette Terry Brien
- Public transit access: Blackpool North railway station
- Website: www.grundyartgallery.com

Listed Building – Grade II
- Official name: Central Library and Grundy Art Gallery
- Designated: 20 October 1983
- Reference no.: 1072014

The Grundy is an art gallery located in Blackpool, Lancashire, England. Its eclectic programme consists of regional historic to recent contemporary art exhibitions. Opened in 1911, it is owned and operated by Blackpool Council.

It is a Grade II listed Edwardian building. Together with the adjoining Central library it was listed on 20 October 1983.

== History ==
Blackpool Council commissioned the building of the Grundy Art Gallery in 1908 following a bequest of 33 artworks and a financial gift from brothers John and Cuthbert Grundy, both of whom were local artists. Cuthbert was described at the time as "A leader of the artistic, literary and scientific life of the town." Designed by Cullen, Lockhead and Brown, the gallery has coupled Ionic columns supporting a stone pediment bearing a carved Blackpool Borough crest. Together with Central library the gallery opened on 26 October 1911. The Edwardian baroque building is Grade II listed.

In 1912, a purchase fund for new artworks was set up to build upon the 33 artworks. By the late 1930s, the collection and general ambition of the gallery had outgrown the original building, and so an extension of two extra galleries was built. It opened in 1938.

In 2009, the Grundy contained nearly 2,000 objects. In 2017 the Grundy's collection consisted of 2,315 objects divided into four main areas: fine art, decorative art, modern jewellery and ephemera.

In 2023 a feasibility study was carried out on extending Central Library and the Grundy Art Gallery into a neighbouring car park. It stated that extending the library and art gallery had the potential to increase visitor numbers by 59,000 per year, including 15,000 additional tourists, and boost annual visitor spend by £860,000. Ellis Williams Architects were appointed to lead the design process. Funding for the project comes from a grant of nearly £6m awarded to Blackpool in July 2022 from the Shared Prosperity Fund – part of the government's Levelling Up agenda.

The gallery is operated and supported by Blackpool Council and is an Arts Council England National Portfolio Organisation. It is a long-standing member of the Contemporary Art Society and holds Museums Accreditation status. Since 2018, its curator has been Paulette Brien.

== Permanent collection ==
The Grundy's works are displayed as part of temporary exhibitions and represent Victorian oils and watercolours, modern British paintings, contemporary jewellery and video, oriental ivories, ceramics, and photographs and souvenirs of Blackpool.

Works in the collection include Aircraftsman Shaw by Welsh painter Augustus John, Sanctuary Wood by English landscape painter Paul Nash, The Yellow Funnel by English painter Eric Ravilious, The Waterway by English painter Lucy Kemp-Welch and Woods and Forests by English landscape painter John Linnell.

Other notable British artists represented in the painting collection include Anna Airy, Samuel John 'Lamorna' Birch, Stephen Bone, Thomas Sidney Cooper, Frederick William Elwell, Stanhope Alexander Forbes, Patrick Hughes, Laura Knight, Charles S Ricketts, David Roberts, Charles Spencelayh and Henry Scott Tuke.

Other artists represented include Craigie Aitchison, Richard Ansdell, Thomas Sidney Cooper, Martin Creed, Thomas Creswick, Stanhope Forbes, Laura Ford, Gilbert & George, Hubert von Herkomer, John Frederick Herring, Sr., Edward Atkinson Hornel, Harold Knight, Lilian Lancaster, Henry Herbert La Thangue, Peter Liversidge, David Roberts, Lindsay Seers, William Shayer, Julian Trevelyan, Eugène Joseph Verboeckhoven and Benjamin Williams Leader.

== Exhibitions ==
On 25 November 2008, American singer Mary Wilson appeared at the Grundy to launch her collection of the gowns worn by Motown female singing group The Supremes – The Story of The Supremes from the Mary Wilson Collection.

In 2016 the gallery hosted Neon: The Charged Line, Britain's "biggest ever survey of neon art" which included pieces by artists including Joseph Kosuth, Tracey Emin and Gavin Turk.

Significant recent exhibitions at the Grundy have included: Grayson Perry: The Vanity of Small Differences (2018), Artist Rooms: Roy Lichtenstein (2019), Artist Rooms: Louise Bourgeois (2023) and Bloomberg New Contemporaries (2023).

The Grundy organises a programme of contemporary visual art exhibitions featuring the work of established and emerging artists from the UK and overseas, as well as historically important artwork loaned from major UK institutions and objects from its own permanent collection. The Grundy also hosts an annual Open Exhibition.

== Grundy art in popular culture ==
In 1998, Harold Knight's painting, A Girl Writing at a Desk was used as the image on the front cover of the Virginia Woolf books A Room of One's Own and Three Guineas, published by Oxford University Press.

== Facilities ==
The Grundy is accessible by steps and there is wheelchair access to the ground floor galleries. The Grundy shop specialises in artist-made jewellery.
