= Sacred Heart Church, Blackpool =

Coordinates: 53.8195°N 3.0537°W

Sacred Heart Church
- Church of the Sacred Hearts of Jesus and Mary
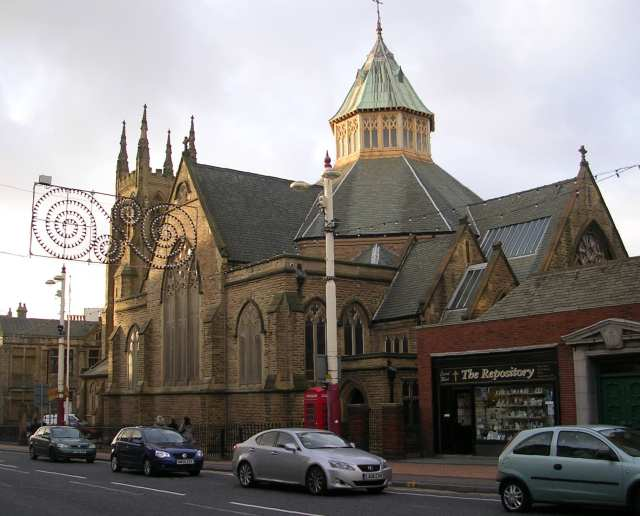
- Sacred Heart Church, from Talbot Road

- Location in Blackpool
- OS grid reference: SD 30726 36433
- Location: Blackpool, Lancashire
- Country: England
- Denomination: Roman Catholic

Architecture
- Functional status: Active
- Heritage designation: Grade II*
- Designated: 20 October 1983
- Architect: E. W. Pugin
- Style: English Gothic
- Completed: 1857

Administration
- Province: Liverpool
- Diocese: Lancaster

Sacred Heart Church is a Roman Catholic church in Blackpool, Lancashire, England, on Talbot Road close to the town centre. It was the first Roman Catholic church built in Blackpool and has been designated a Grade II* listed building by English Heritage.

== History ==
Sacred Heart Church was founded by the Jesuits as the town's first Roman Catholic church. It was built in 1857 to a design by Edward Welby Pugin. The church was enlarged, to the east, in 1894, to a design by Pugin & Pugin. It was designated as a Grade II* listed building by English Heritage on 20 October 1983. The Grade II* listing is for "particularly important buildings of more than special interest". Since 2004, it has been served by priests from the Roman Catholic Diocese of Lancaster. The parish priest is Canon Robert Dewhurst.

== Architecture ==
The church is constructed of stone, with slate roofs, in the English Gothic style. Its plan consists of a four-bay nave with an octagonal crossing, around which the aisles and transepts lie. The lead roof over the crossing is pyramidal and has an octagonal wooden lantern with side tracery. The lantern itself has a pyramidal roof of copper. The church tower is to the west; it has four stages with angled buttresses and corner pinnacles, and buttressed aisles with clerestories. There are three-light windows in the aisles and four-light windows in the nave transepts. Stained glass in the nave windows was designed by Frances Barnett of Leith. The windows of the 1894 extension are larger than elsewhere and have reticulated tracery. The large east window has stained glass, possibly by William Wailes.

The nave arcades are supported by clustered marble piers with foliated tops and moulded lancet arches. There is a two-bay gallery to the west. The chancel is flanked by two lady chapels. The church fittings include a white marble octagonal pulpit that is carved and sits on red and black columns.

There is a Neo-Georgian presbytery to the east of the building that was built c. 1950, and a former school to the west that dates from 1898. The church has no graveyard.

== Interior ==
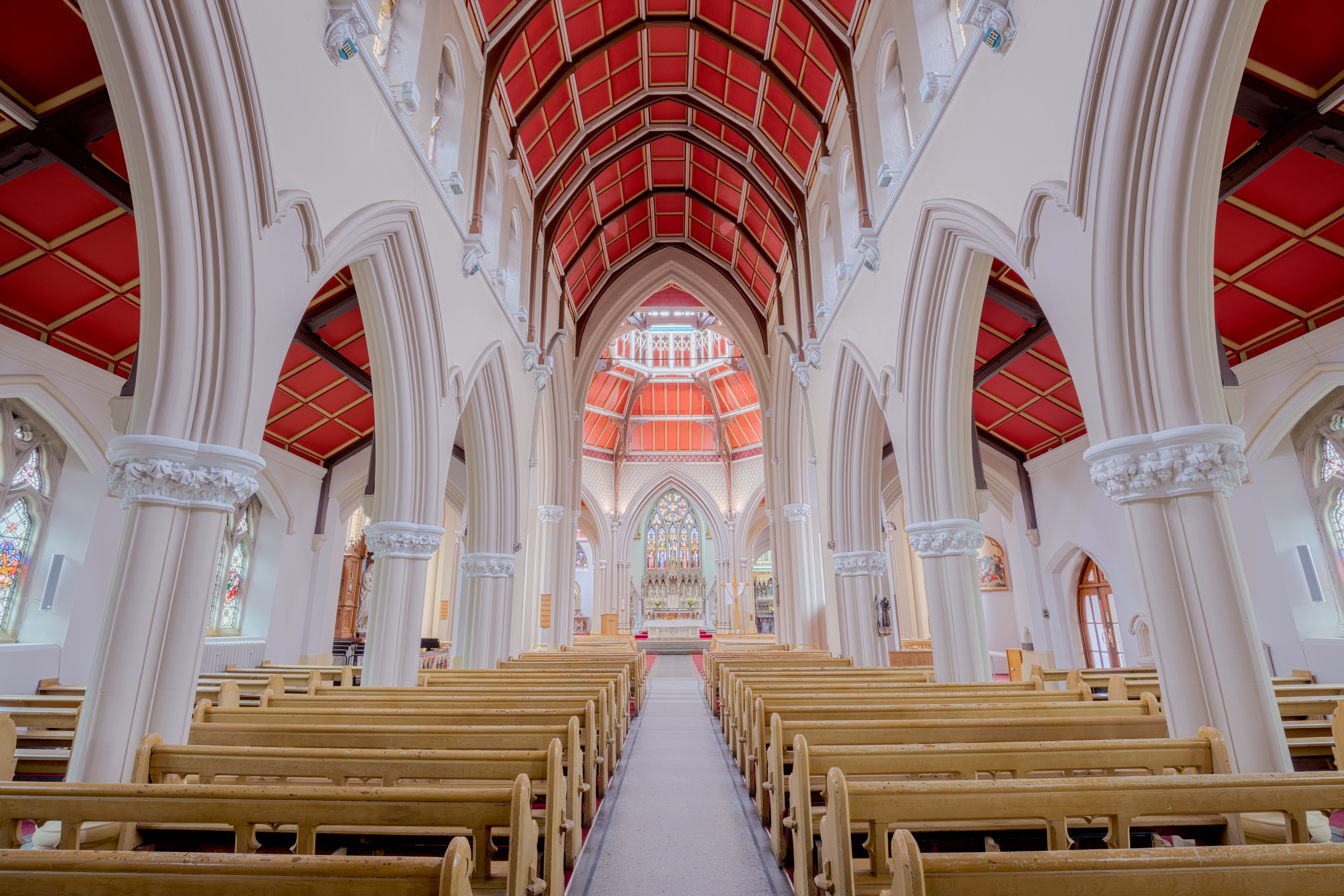
Nave

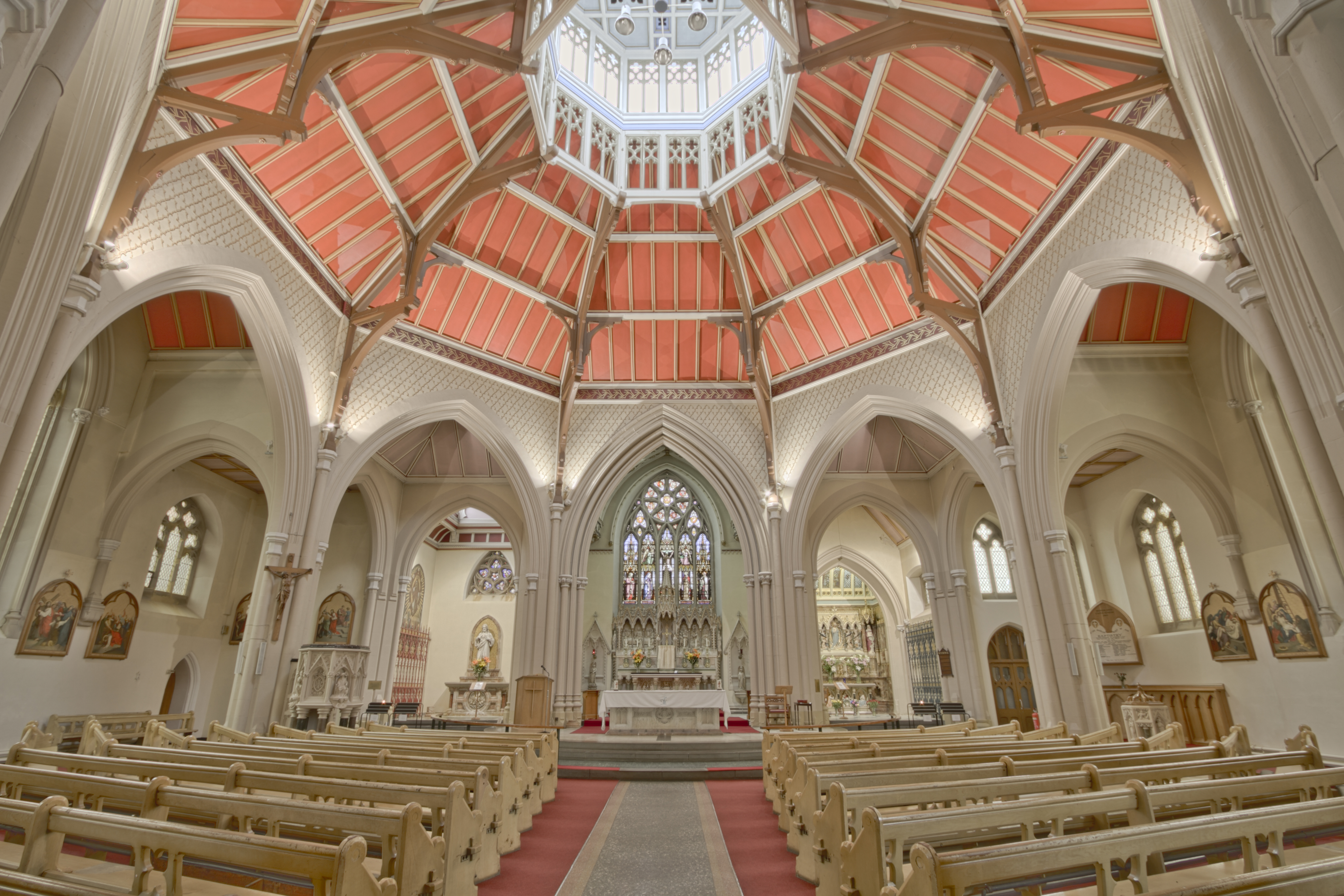
Altar

== See also ==
- Listed buildings in Blackpool
