= Steeplechase roller coaster =

Kind of single rail rollercoaster

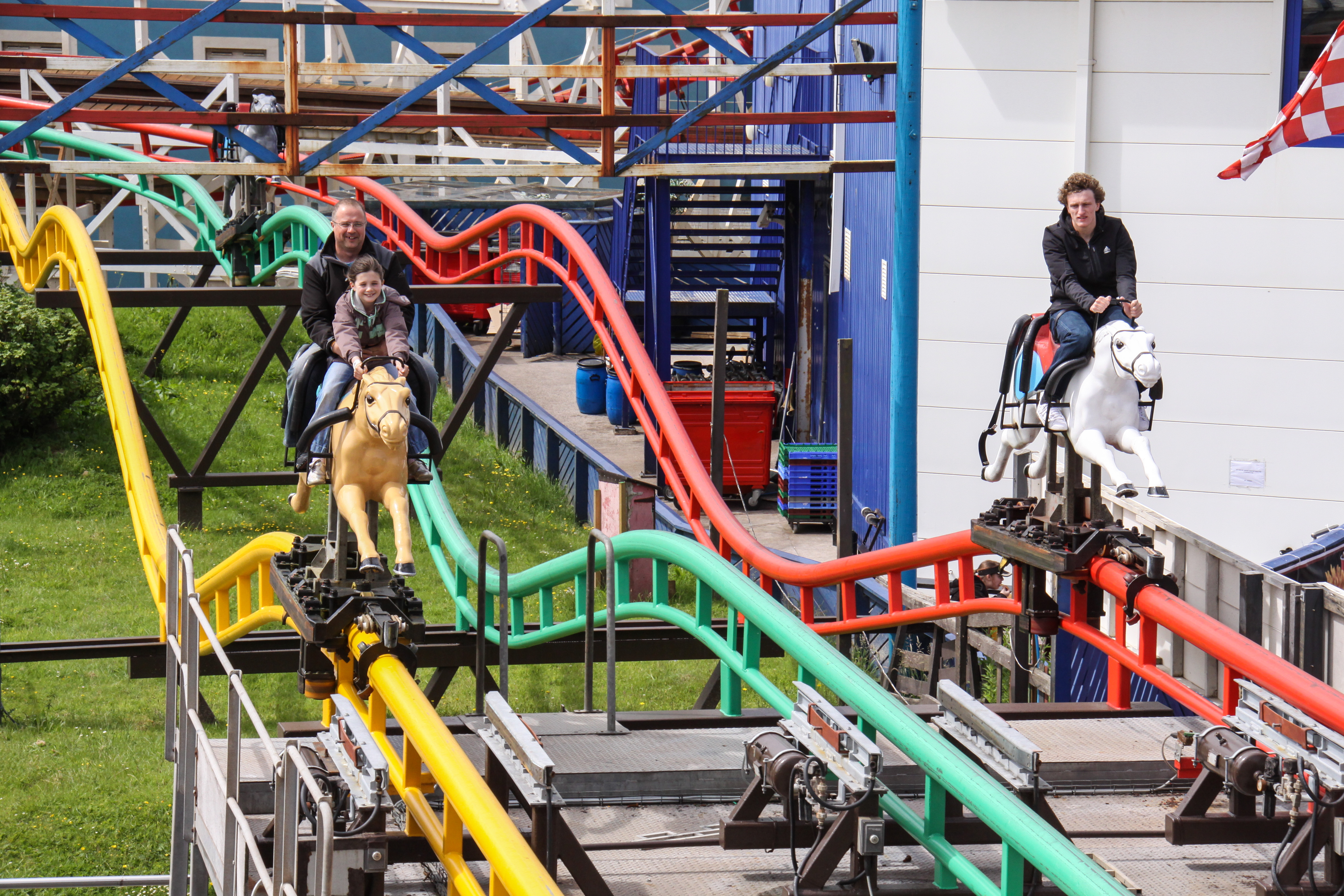
Steeplechase at Blackpool Pleasure Beach

A Steeplechase roller coaster is a type of roller coaster that has several side-by-side tracks in a dueling "racing" arrangement. Riders straddle horse-shaped single cars and launch simultaneously, as from a horse-race starting line.

== Examples ==
The Steeplechase at Blackpool Pleasure Beach is the last remaining example of a steeplechase roller coaster still in operation.

Motorcycle Chase was a modernized steeplechase roller coaster built at Knott's Berry Farm in 1976 featuring single motorbike-themed vehicles racing side by side, each on one of four parallel tracks, launched together. One or two riders straddled each "Indian motorcycle" attraction vehicle. The tubular steel monorail track closely followed dips and bumps in the “road" and tilted to lean riders about the curves. Gasoline Alley, an electric steel-guide rail car ride below, was built together and intimately intertwined, which enhanced ride-to-ride interaction thrill value. Rider safety concerns of the high center of gravity coupled with the method of rider restraints caused it to be re-themed to Wacky Soap Box Racers with vehicles now attached in four-car trains, each car seating two riders, strapped in low (nearly straddling the track), surrounded by the close fitting car sides, and the dips and bumps of the track were straightened flat in 1980. Motorcycle Chase/Wacky Soap Box Racers was removed in 1996 for a dueling loop coaster Windjammer Surf Racers and now a launched coaster named Xcelerator takes its place.

The former Steeplechase Park at Coney Island, New York City, was named for its thrilling Steeplechase attraction, and is perhaps the most famous of this type of coaster.

In 2017, S&S - Sansei Technologies announced that they would be reviving the Steeplechase coasters with redesigned trains and restraints.
