= Geoffrey Thompson (businessman) =

British businessman (1936–2004)

William "Geoffrey" Thompson OBE
- Born: William Geoffrey Thompson; 16 November 1936; Manchester, UK
- Died: 12 June 2004 (aged 67); Blackpool, UK
- Occupation: Businessman
- Spouse: Barbara Joan Thompson (1962–2004; his death)
- Children: Amanda Jean Thompson; Fiona Carolyn Gilje; Nicholas William Thompson
- Parent(s): Leonard Thompson; Doris Thompson

William Geoffrey Thompson OBE (16 November 1936 – 12 June 2004) was a British businessman who was the owner and managing director of Pleasure Beach Resort (better known as Blackpool Pleasure Beach), Adventure Coast Southport, and Frontierland Western Theme Park. He rose to his position in 1976 after the death of his father, Leonard Thompson.

== Career ==
Geoffrey Thompson was appointed managing director of Pleasure Beach Resort in 1976, following the death of his father. During his tenure, he bought two separate amusement parks, Adventure Coast Southport and Frontierland Western Theme Park, the latter of which he closed in 2000. He invested heavily into Pleasure Beach Resort throughout his years of ownership, overseeing the installations of Steeplechase, Avalanche, Revolution, The Big One, Launch Pad, and Valhalla.

He was on a number of trade agencies, such as the English Tourist Board, the British Association of Leisure Parks, and Piers and Attractions, and was appointed an OBE for this work. In 1986, Pleasure Beach Resort became one of the first companies in the United Kingdom to register with the Government Profit Related Pay Unit. Under this scheme, the company agreed that, where profits exceeded £1 million, 10% would be distributed among the permanent staff according to their length of service. Geoffrey was often in dispute with Blackpool Council over their decision to allow private traders to use land opposite Pleasure Beach Resort. He won an appeal to clear the land of all trading attractions and Pleasure Beach Resort has remained unaffected by the situation.

=== Major installations ===
During his tenure, many major attractions were built at Pleasure Beach Resort.

Attraction	Age	Year				
Attraction	Age	1970s	1980s	1990s	2000s	2010s
Steeplechase	48–49	1977–present				
Revolution	46	1979–present				
Space Invader 2	24		1984–2008			
Avalanche	37		1988–present			
The Big One	31			1994–present		
Launch Pad	28			1997–present		
Valhalla	25				2000–present	

== Personal life ==
Geoffrey Thompson was born on 16 November 1936 in Manchester. He married Barbara Foxcroft in 1962, and had three children; Amanda, Nicholas and Fiona. He was awarded an OBE in the 1997 Prime Minister's Resignation Honours.

Thompson attended Arnold School and Rossall School, before moving to Shrewsbury. He later read Economics at Clare College, Cambridge. After graduating, he moved to the United States to broaden his education, studying Business Administration at Wharton School of the University of Pennsylvania.

Thompson died at Pleasure Beach Resort on 12 June 2004, while attending his daughter Amanda's wedding. He left the park to Amanda.

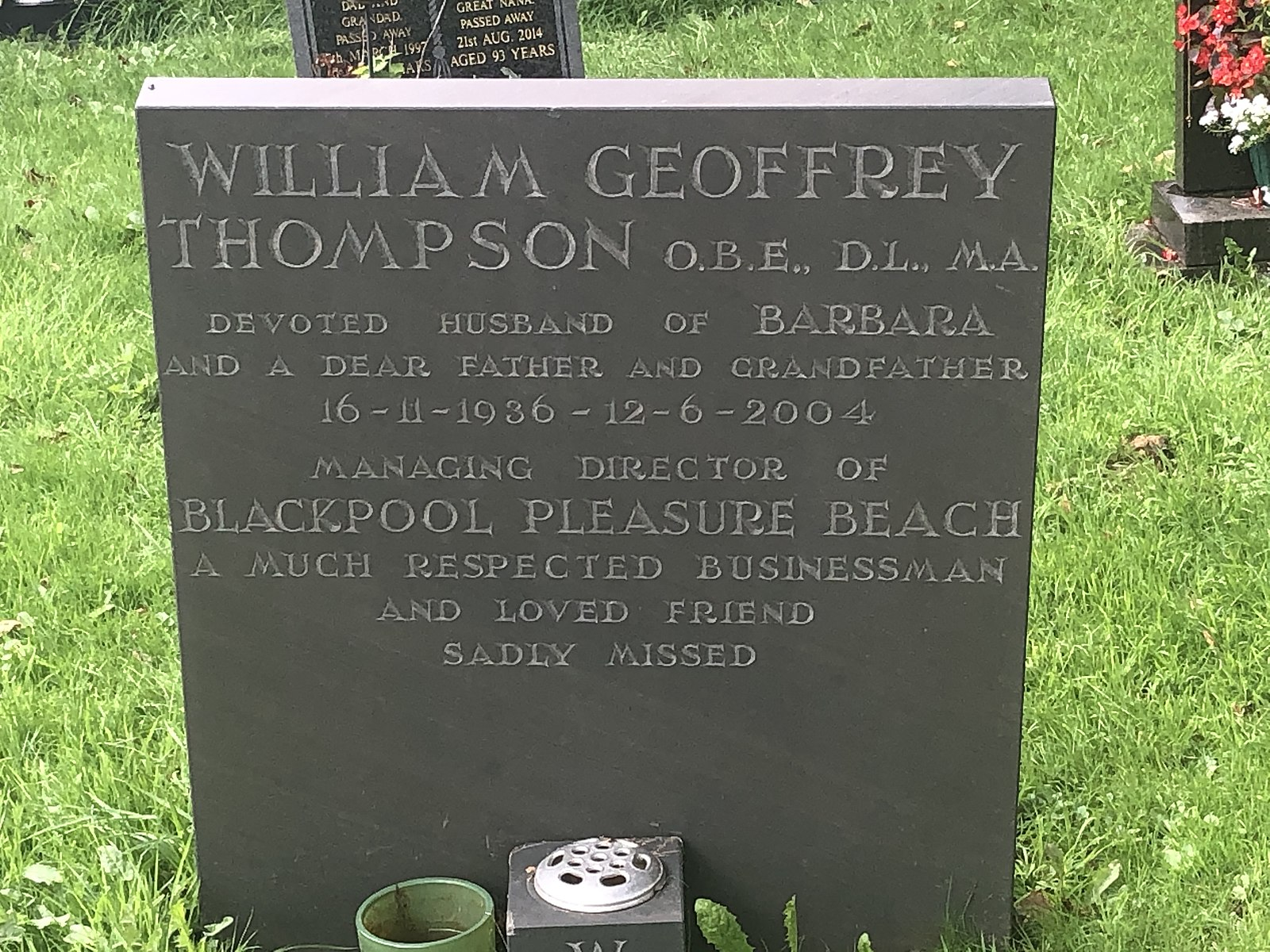
His gravestone
