= Icon (roller coaster) =

Steel roller coaster at Pleasure Beach Resort

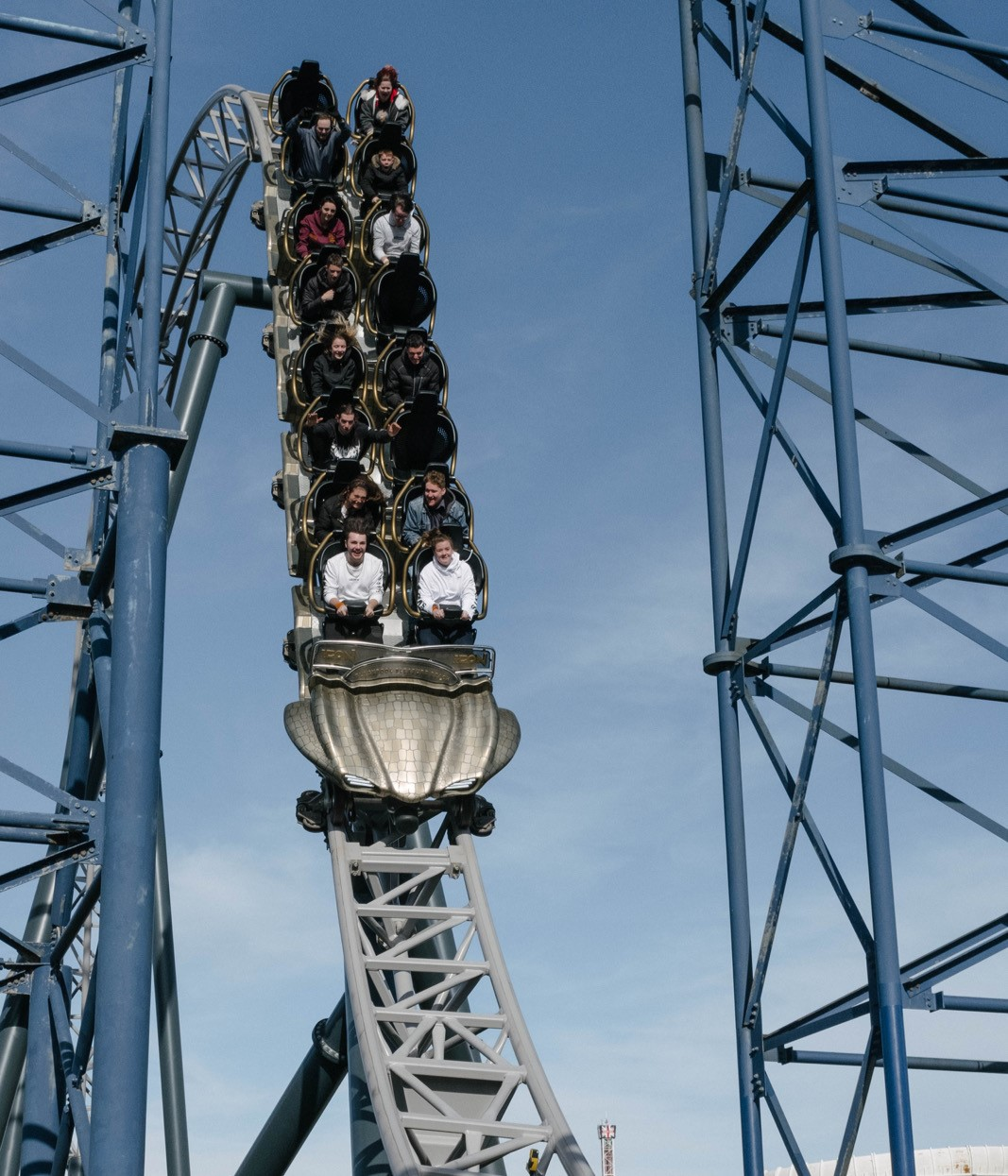

Pleasure Beach Resort
- Location: Pleasure Beach Resort
- Coordinates: 53°47′25″N 3°3′20″W
- Status: Operating
- Opening date: 25 May 2018
- Cost: £16,250,000

General statistics
- Type: Steel – Launched
- Manufacturer: Mack Rides
- Designer: Mack Rides GmbH & Co. KG
- Model: Launch Coaster (Custom)
- Lift/launch system: Two LSM launches
- Height: 88.5 ft (27.0 m)
- Drop: 82 ft (25 m)
- Length: 3,750 ft (1,140 m)
- Speed: 52.8 mph (85.0 km/h)
- Inversions: 1
- Duration: 2:41
- G-force: 4.3
- Height restriction: 51.2 in (130 cm)
- Trains: 3 trains with 4 cars; riders arranged 2 across in 2 rows for a total of 16 riders per train
- Icon at RCDB

Icon (sometimes stylised as ICON) is a launched roller coaster at Pleasure Beach Resort (better known as Blackpool Pleasure Beach) in Blackpool, England. Manufactured by Mack Rides, the ride opened on 25 May 2018, and had a total cost of £16.25 million. The ride was marketed as the first multi-launch roller coaster in the United Kingdom, and the first new roller coaster at the park in 24 years. It uses a series of magnetic linear synchronous motors (LSMs) to propel the trains along the track.

== History ==
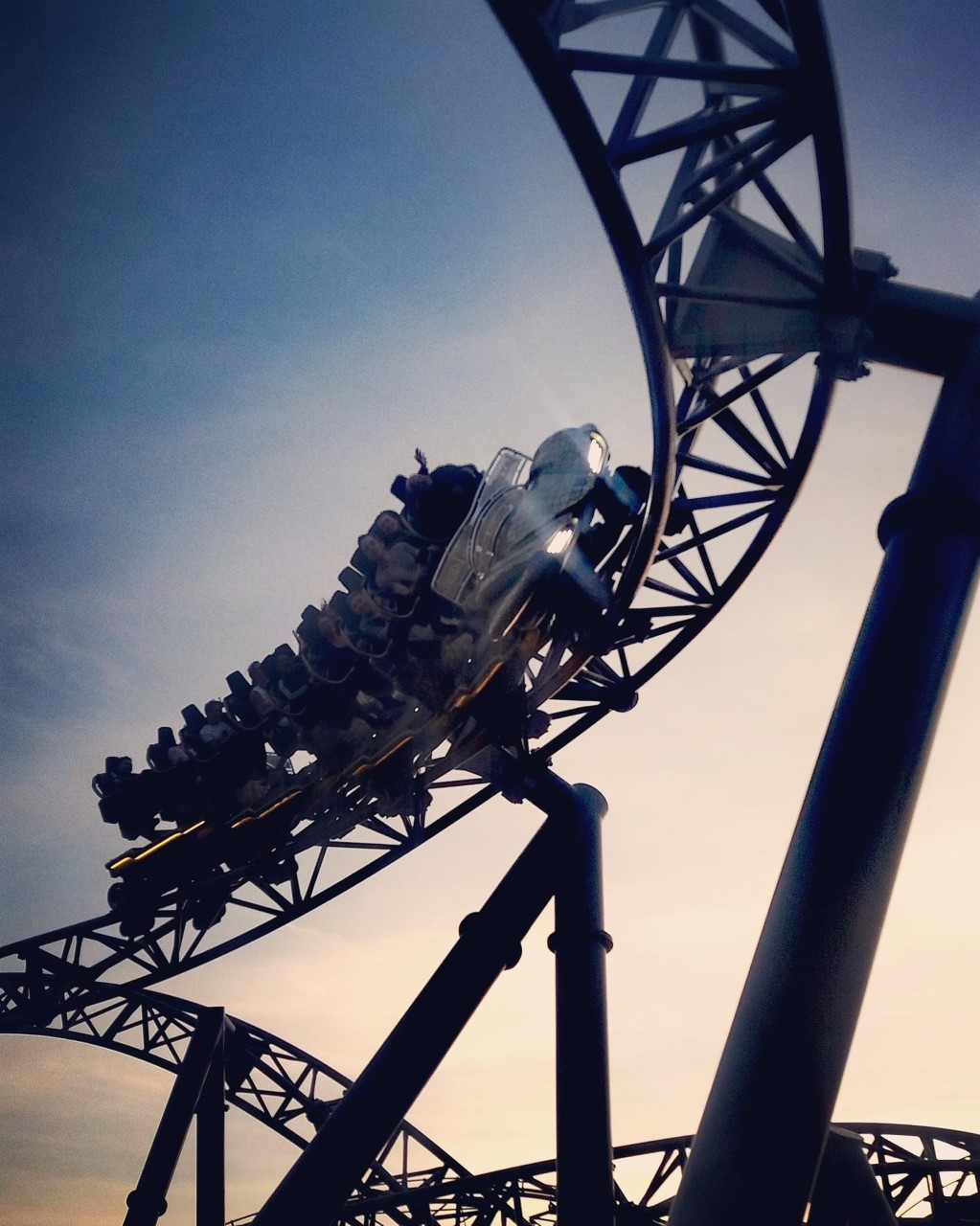
Icon train with lighting

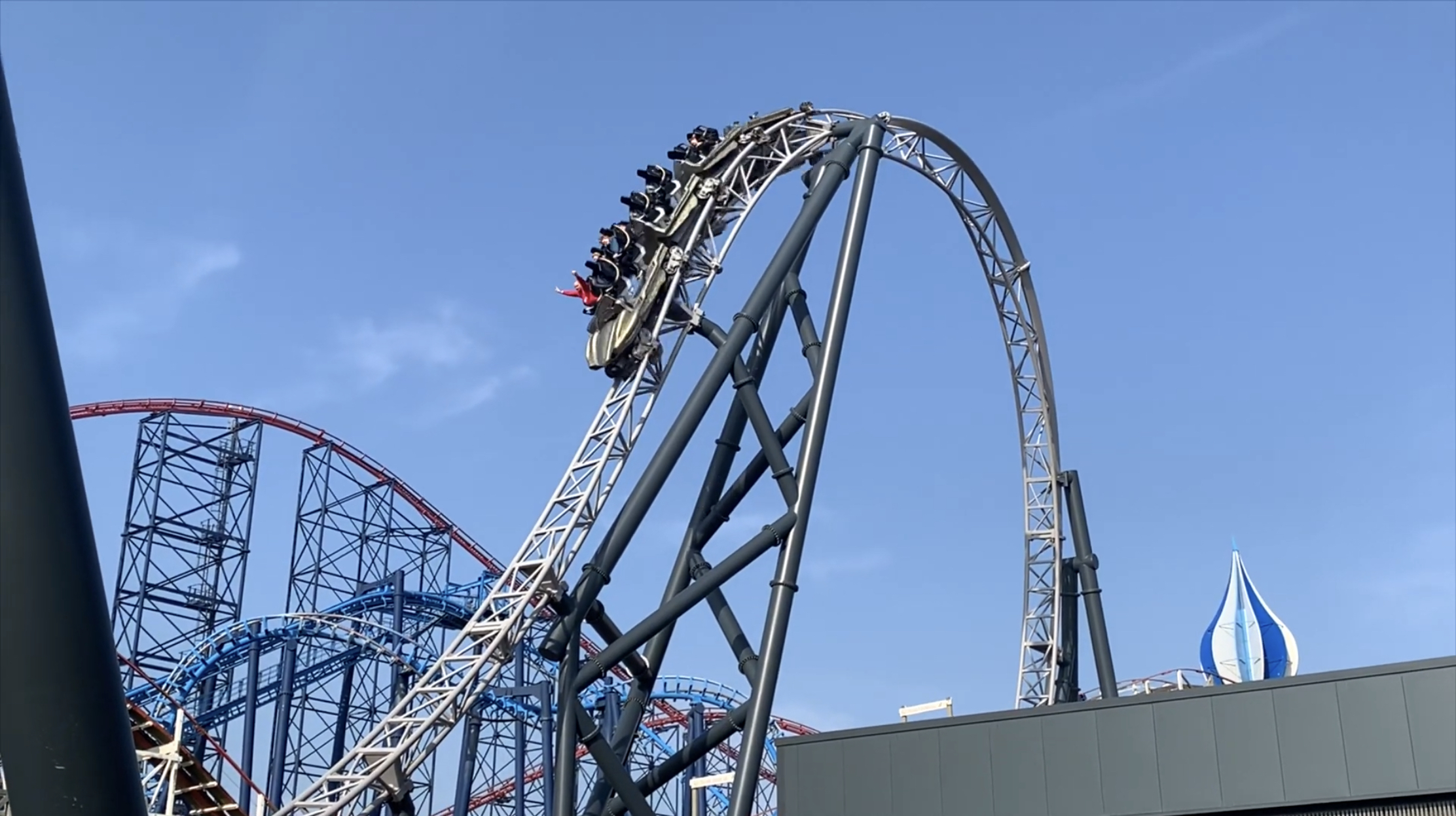
Icons non-inverting Jr. Immelman

On 28 September 2016, Pleasure Beach Resort released plans for a new steel roller coaster entitled "Construction 2018". It would be constructed by Mack Rides at the cost of £16,250,000 for the 2018 season. In addition, they released a simulated POV of the ride. On 1 December 2016, construction of the ride began. By 30 March 2017, the foundations for the ride were 80% completed, with 282 concrete cylinders driven for main pilings. On 10 April 2017, the park announced the official name of the ride, Icon, along with a tagline of "Dare to ride". Icon is the park's sixth steel coaster and tenth coaster overall.

Around the time of announcement, 8,000 metres of steel tubes and pre-cast concrete piles had been placed 12 metres into the ground and 5,500 tonnes of soil had been dug out. The first support pieces arrived at Pleasure Beach Resort on 29 September 2017, followed by the first pieces of track on 19 October 2017. The final piece of track for the ride was installed on 14 February 2018, with both Amanda Thompson and Nick Thompson, the managers of the park, signing the interior of the steelwork.

Icon opened to the public on 25 May 2018.

In 2021, the lap bars were modified to have seatbelts fitted. Later that year, it was announced that the ride would be fitted with a spinning car in the back row for the 2022 season. The new experience is an upcharge attraction, starting at £15 per ride and rising to £25 per ride for VIP. The spinning car's name is "Ensō", which is Japanese for "circular form".

== Ride experience ==
Upon dispatch, the train slowly rolls out of the station into the launch area. An audio buildup featuring a voiceover repeating the word "icon" marks the LSM launch, which accelerates the train to 80 km/h (50 mph) through a tunnel into a 25 metre (82 ft) tall top hat. The top hat then passes under The Big One's lift hill. This is followed by a shallow non-inverting inclined loop before a series of banked turns, intertwining with Big Dipper and Steeplechase, before turning over Steeplechase's brake run and navigating through a downward barrel roll. After diving into another tunnel, a second LSM launch propels the train to 85 km/h (52.8 mph) into a non-inverting 27 metre (88.5 ft) junior Immelmann loop, the tallest part of the layout. A series of highly banked turns, airtime hills, a helix and two s-curves follow, before the train hits the final brake run and returns to the station. A full ride experience on Icon lasts approximately two minutes and 41 seconds. The ride subjects riders to a maximum of 4.3 Gs.

Icon has three trains. Each train has four cars, each car featuring two two-person rows, (excluding the train with the Ensō car, which seats only two). This makes for a total of 16 riders per train (14 on the Ensō train).
