= Leonard Thompson (businessman) =

British businessman (1902–1976)

- Born: 16 September 1902
- Died: 1 February 1976 (aged 73)
- Occupation: Businessman
- Spouse: Doris Thompson (1928–1976; his death)
- Children: Geoffrey Thompson; Mary Louise Thompson; Carol Jean Thompson

Leonard Thompson (9 September 1902 – 1 February 1976) was a British businessman who was the managing director and owner of Pleasure Beach Resort (better known as Blackpool Pleasure Beach). He rose to the position in 1929 after the death of his wife's father, William Bean.

== Biography ==
Leonard Thompson met his future wife, Doris Bean, in 1928. He worked for the Swedish Match Company at the time, and the couple decided to settle down in London upon marriage in 1928. Within a year of their marriage, Doris' father, William Bean, died whilst on a Mediterranean cruise. Both Leonard and his wife decided to return to Blackpool to run Pleasure Beach Resort. While Doris became a director, Leonard became chairman and managing director of the park, roles they held for almost 50 years.

Leonard's years of the running Pleasure Beach Resort saw many of its most notable attractions installed, including Grand National, Fun House and the ice shows.

== Personal life ==
Leonard Thompson was born on 16 September 1902. He married Doris Bean in 1928. He had three children: Geoffrey, Mary Louise, and Carol Jean.

On 15 April 1948, Mary Louise, the eldest daughter, died when Pan Am Flight 1-10 crashed while landing in dense fog at Shannon Airport, killing 30 passengers. She was en route to study in the United States before attending the University of Oxford.

Thompson died on 1 February 1976 at the age of 73. His son, Geoffrey, took control of the park, with Doris taking on the role of company chairman.
