= Obleukhov =

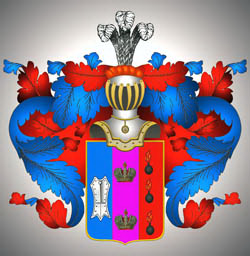
Obleukhov C.O.A.

Obleukhov or Ableukhov (Russian: Облеу́хов; masculine) or Obleukhova/Ableukhova (Облеу́хова; feminine) is a Russian surname. It belongs to the Russian noble Obleukhow family.

It derives from a patronymic which itself is derived from the nicknames "Облаух" (Oblaukh) and "Облаухий" (Oblaukhy)—alternatively spelled "Аблеух" (Ableukh) and "Облеухий" (Obleukhy)—meaning someone with round, plump ears.

Notable people with the surname include:

- Aleksandr Dmitriyevich Obleukhov (1742-1814), Russian artillery mayor general
- Aleksandr Nikanorovich Obleukhov (1824-1879), Russian mayor general (promoted upon discharge)
- Timofey Obleukhov, Russian cast member in the Hot Ice Show, a long-running ice show in the United Kingdom

== Fictional characters ==
- Apollon Ableukhov and Nikolay Ableukhov, characters from Petersburg, a novel by Andrey Bely
