= Valhalla (Blackpool Pleasure Beach) =

Amusement ride at Pleasure Beach Resort

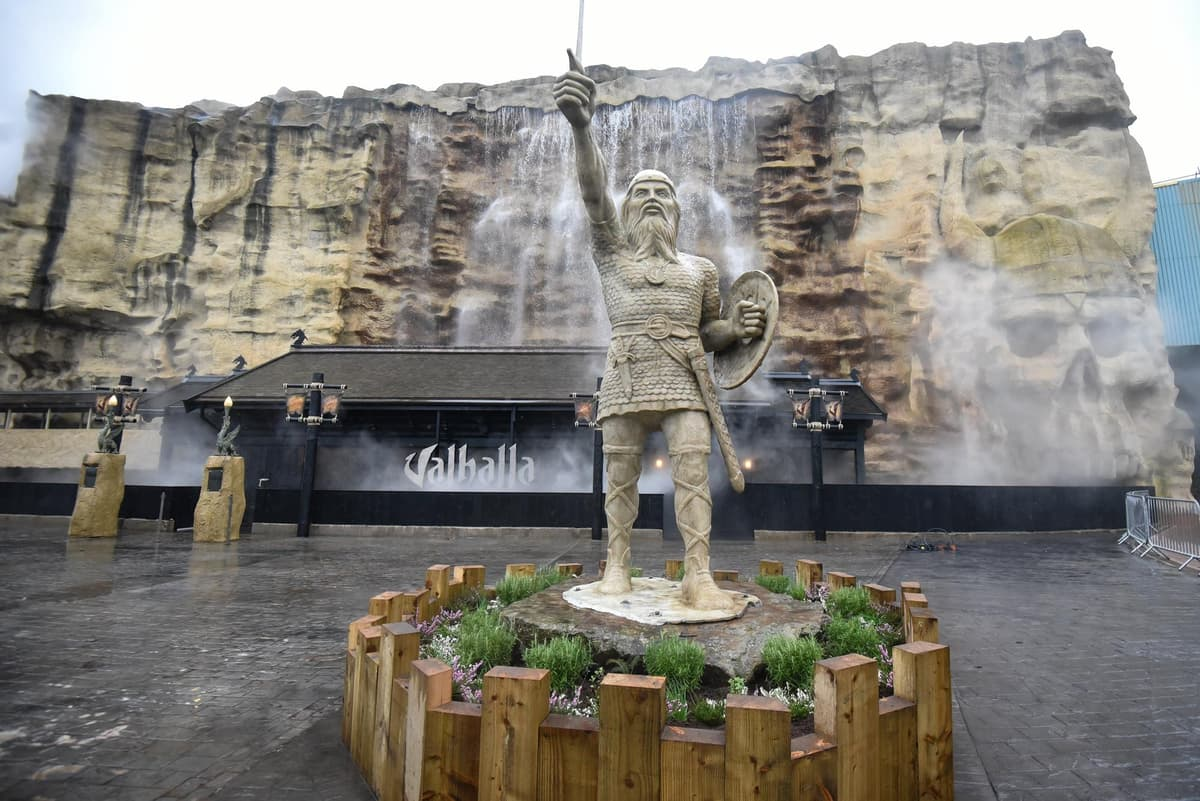

Pleasure Beach Resort
- Status: Operating
- Cost: £15,000,000
- Opening date: 14 June 2000
- Replaced: Fun House

General statistics
- Type: Log flume
- Manufacturer: Intamin
- Designer: Pleasure Beach Resort, Farmer Studios
- Lift system: Two conveyor lift hills
- Height: 80 ft (24 m)
- Drop: 62 ft (19 m)
- Length: 610 m (2,000 ft)
- Speed: 70 km/h (43 mph)
- Max vertical angle: 70°
- Capacity: 2000 riders per hour
- Duration: Approximately 4 minutes
- Boats: 12 boats. Riders are arranged 2 across in 4 rows for a total of 8 riders per boat.
- Restraint style: Grab rails
- Height restriction: 130 cm (4 ft 3 in)

Valhalla is an indoor log flume and dark ride located at Pleasure Beach Resort (better known as Blackpool Pleasure Beach) in Blackpool, England. Opened on 14 June 2000 at a cost of £15 million, it is one of the longest indoor dark rides in the world, with a ride time of over four minutes. Valhalla features three drops and uses special effects which simulate fire, water, and snow. It was manufactured by Intamin.

== History ==
The park spent three years planning and developing the replacement of the former Fun House attraction, which was destroyed by a fire in 1991. The ride was announced during a media preview event, where its name was revealed to be Valhalla (which in Norse mythology refers to a promised land in the afterlife for Viking warriors). Regia Anglorum, a Medieval reenactment organization, participated in the event, with members rowing a Viking vessel to shore and reenacting a small sword battle.

Valhalla opened to the public on 14 June 2000. Television personality Jonathan Ross, along with his wife, screenwriter Jane Goldman, were presenters on opening day. Strongman Geoff Capes also appeared dressed as Hägar the Horrible. As a finale for the ride's opening day, the park put on a fireworks display set to music.

In 2016, 2017, 2018, 2021, and 2023, Valhalla was named "Best Water Ride In The World" in the annual Golden Ticket Awards publication from Amusement Today.

In May 2004, a fire which damaged the Grand National roller coaster and the Alice in Wonderland dark ride was extinguished using some of Valhalla's huge water content.

Valhalla was closed towards the end of the 2011 season to undergo its first major refurbishment. The ride reopened on 5 May 2012.

On 20 December 2019, Pleasure Beach Resort announced that Valhalla would remain closed for the duration of the 2020 season, the ride's 20th anniversary year. It was originally due to reopen for the 2021 season, but this was delayed due to the COVID-19 pandemic. The ride reopened on 12 April 2023 for "technical rehearsals". Whilst the ride was open, not all effects were present or operational. The ride’s official grand reopening was on 10 May 2023.

The main theme music used for the ride until 2019 was a song called "Song of the Elders", originally composed by Grahame Maclean for the last segment of Rhythmos, the 2000 incarnation of the park's Hot Ice Show. The new soundtrack, introduced in 2023, was created by The Notable Stranger.

== Design ==
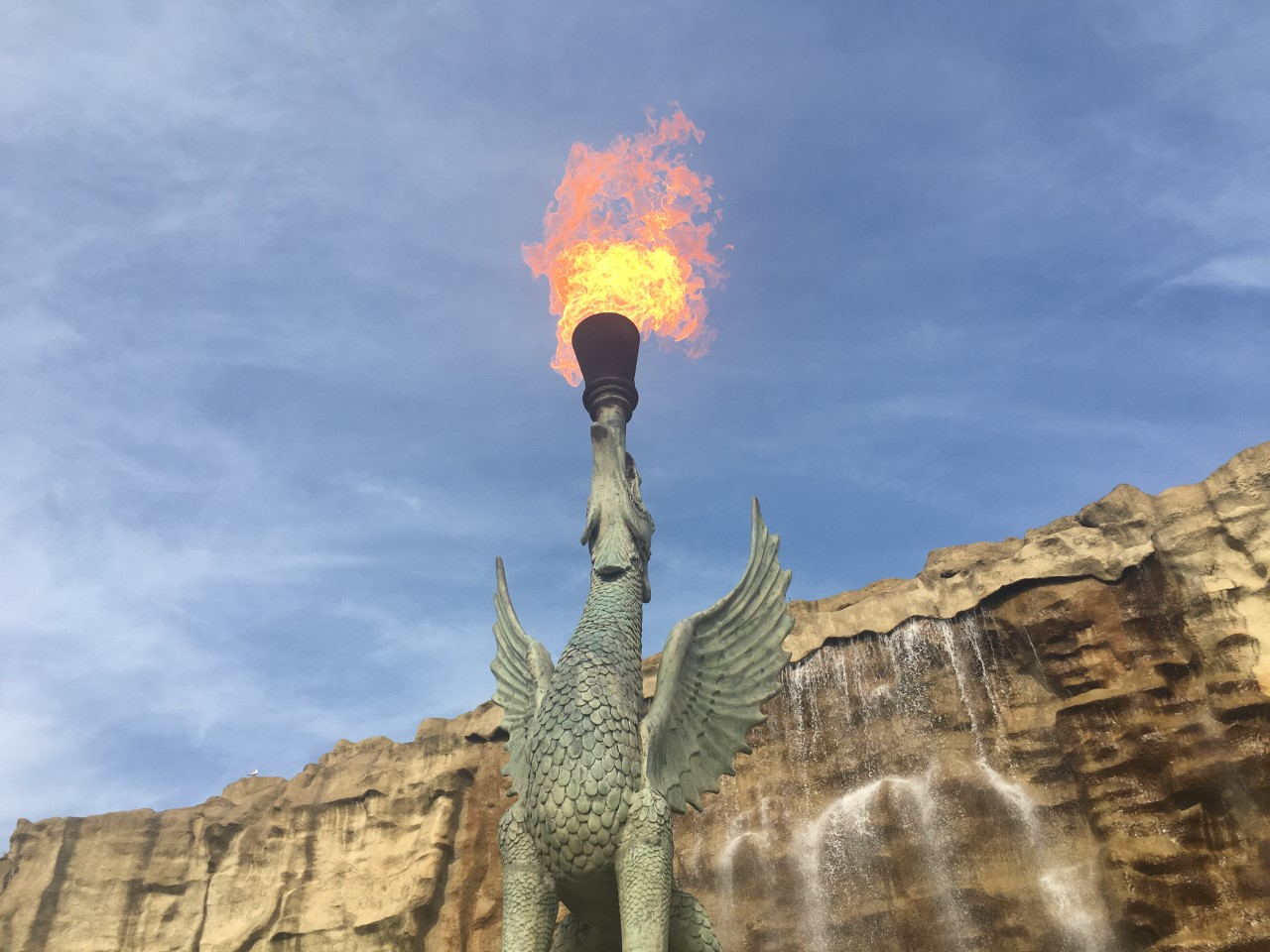
Dragon torch with flame effect at ride entrance

Conceived by former park owner Geoffrey Thompson, the ride is based on Valhalla from Norse mythology and features sixteen different scenes. The show, animations, and effects were designed by various ride manufacturers from the United Kingdom, France, and the United States. Intamin provided the water transit system.

Valhalla uses a variety of physical and environmental effects, including artificial snow, extreme changes in temperature ranging from −20 °C to 40 °C, and several water effects, including a water vortex. Track elements include a turntable that turns boats 180 degrees.

More than 100,000 imperial gallons (450,000 L; 120,000 US gal) of water are recycled per minute, and roughly 35,000 cubic feet (990 m^{3}) of gas is used per hour to provide the flame effects. Valhalla has a theoretical capacity of 2,000 riders per hour, and a full ride experience lasts approximately four minutes, covering nearly half a mile in length. The ride is housed inside a 24 metre (80 ft) building. Its façade is composed of artificial rock and features a large waterfall that dispenses 12,000 gallons of water per minute.

Following the 2001 season, the boats were replaced, and each had a redesigned cannon attached to the front. The padded grabrails in the front row had a slight design change and the back three rows were swapped in favour of curved metal grab rails. The old boats were shipped out to Parque Warner Madrid in Spain to be used on their new Río Bravo log flume ride.

New seats were installed on the boats following the 2007 season, which included padded headrests and updated metal grabrails. A new paint job was completed on the boats in 2012.

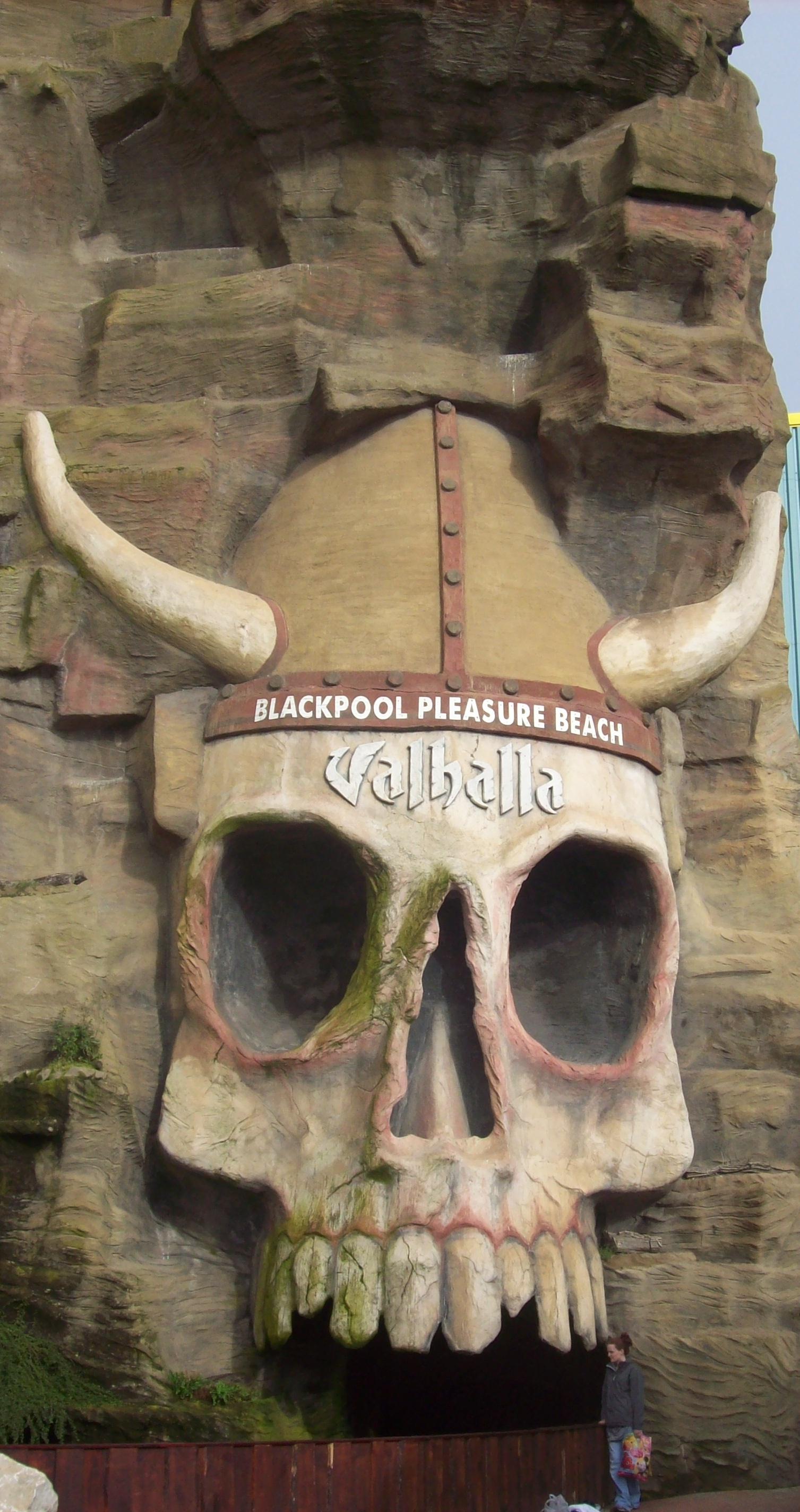
Boats enter the ride through a skull's mouth. The original version is depicted here.

== Ride experience ==
Passengers board a boat stylized like a Viking longship. The boat enters the building and veers to the left, passing a Viking statue and two dogs, as a voice narrates the journey. The boat then ascends the first lift hill. As the boat crests the lift hill, it makes a small descent and veers to the right in total darkness. The boat then turns right into faux fire. The boat then turns right again and travels into complete darkness before coming to a stop. The boat turns 160° and moves forward into a small drop where the on-ride photo is taken, and water effects soak riders.

The boat enters the ice room where fake snow is being blown out over frozen Viking warriors as a voice continues the narration. The boat veers to the left in this room and into darkness again. The boat descends a 70° drop into the water. It then travels through a tunnel of water jets and cannons. The boat then turns right and enters the second lift hill. At the top of the hill, the boat veers to the right, where two hammers swoop down and splash water over riders. The boat moves to the left, where more visual and audio effects unfold. A creature above the boat roars, emits smoke, and lights up as the boat descends a double-down drop into a ring of fire, which is extinguished by the splash of the boat. The boat exits the building to the left, where a final water cannon goes off as it returns to the station.
