= Wallace & Gromit's Thrill-O-Matic =

Amusement ride at Pleasure Beach Resort

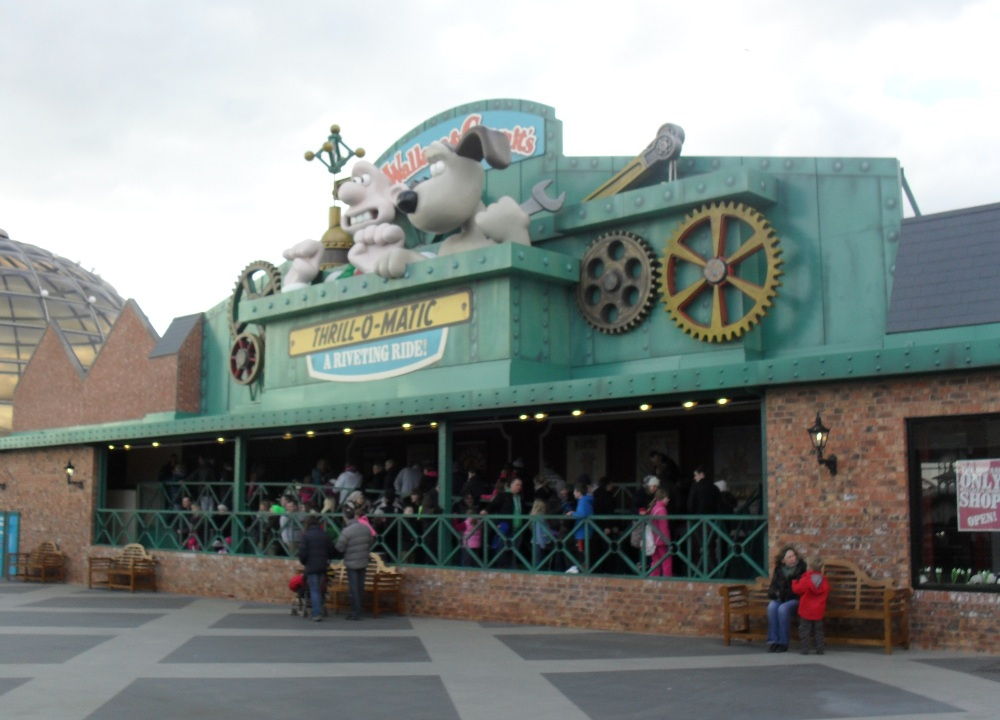
- The facade for Wallace & Gromit's Thrill-O-Matic

Pleasure Beach Resort
- Status: Operating
- Cost: £5.25 million
- Opening date: 29 April 2013
- Replaced: The Gold Mine

Ride statistics
- Attraction type: Tracked dark ride
- Designer: Farmer Attraction Development
- Model: Dark Ride
- Theme: Wallace and Gromit
- Length: 275 m (902 ft)
- Vehicles: Single car. Riders are arranged 2 across in 2 rows for a total of 4 riders per vehicle.
- Duration: Approximately 4 minutes
- Height restriction: 90 cm (2 ft 11 in)
- Theming: Aardman Animations; KD Theming Technologies; Paragon Creative
- Scenes: 20
- Original manufacturer: Arrow Development
- Overhauled by: W.G.H Transportation Engineering

Wallace & Gromit's Thrill-O-Matic is a dark ride at Pleasure Beach Resort (better known as Blackpool Pleasure Beach) in Blackpool, England. It opened on 29 April 2013 as a retheme of the former The Gold Mine ride, which utilized the building and track from 1971 to 2011.

The Gold Mine was installed at a cost of £150,000, and was originally designed by Arrow Dynamics. The Gold Mine closed following the 2011 season, and the ride was overhauled by W.G.H. Transportation Engineering. The current iteration of the ride is based on the Wallace & Gromit films.

== Design and ride experience ==
The ride's opening ceremony was hosted by Nick Park, Amanda Thompson, Nick Thompson, Nick Farmer and Merlin Crossingham.

The ride, which cost £5.25 million, was created by Pleasure Beach Resort in association with the creators of Wallace and Gromit, Aardman Animations. The ride's cars are designed to resemble one of Wallace's slippers. The ride lasts approximately four minutes, and features scenes from the Wallace and Gromit films A Grand Day Out, The Wrong Trousers, A Close Shave, The Curse of the Were-Rabbit and A Matter of Loaf and Death. The ride shares exactly the same track layout as the previous Gold Mine Ride, with small drops throughout the ride.

The ride exits into a gift shop with Wallace and Gromit merchandise. Additionally, a concession operated by Picsolve allows on-ride photos to be purchased.

In 2025, the ride was updated to include scenes from Wallace and Gromit: Vengeance Most Fowl.

== Reception ==
Rhonda Carrier of The Guardian noted the ride's "nostalgic ambience" and called it a "gentle dark ride".

Emma Clayton of Telegraph & Argus called the ride "delightfully bonkers" and "great fun".

== See also ==
- 2013 in amusement parks
- Wallace & Gromit
