= Doris Thompson =

British businesswoman (1903–2004)

Doris Thompson OBE
- Born: Lilian Doris Bean; 12 January 1903; Great Yarmouth, England, UK
- Died: 23 June 2004 (aged 101); Barnacre, England, UK
- Occupation: Businesswoman
- Spouse: Leonard Thompson (1928–1976; his death)
- Children: Geoffrey Thompson; Mary Louise Thompson; Carol Jean Thompson

Lilian Doris Thompson OBE JP (née Bean; 12 January 1903 – 23 June 2004) was a British businesswoman who was the managing director and chairman of Pleasure Beach Resort (better known as Blackpool Pleasure Beach).

== Career highlights ==
Doris Thompson became a director at Pleasure Beach Resort in 1929, immediately after the death of her father, whilst her husband, Leonard Thompson, became managing director and chairman. Whilst she initially focused on her young family, she gradually assisted more in the development of the park behind the scenes, especially throughout the 1930s, which saw the opening of Fun House, Grand National, and the introduction of the ice show.

When Leonard Thompson died in 1976, Doris Thompson succeeded him as chairman of Pleasure Beach Resort, whilst her son, Geoffrey Thompson, became managing director.

== Education ==
Doris Thompson was educated locally in Blackpool, and then at Malvern Ladies' College in Worcestershire. In 1928, Doris married Leonard Thompson, "a bright, ambitious, Oxford-educated businessman". He worked for the Swedish Match Company at the time, and the couple were content to begin married life in London. However, within a year, the death of her father William Bean threw their plans into disarray. The couple decided to return to Blackpool to continue running his park. While Doris became a director, Leonard became chairman and managing director of the park, roles they held for almost 50 years.

== Personal life ==
Doris Thompson was born on 12 January 1903 in Great Yarmouth. She married Leonard Thompson in 1928, at the age of 25. She had three children: Geoffrey, Mary Louise, and Carol Jean.

On 15 April 1948, Mary Louise, the eldest daughter, died when Pan Am Flight 1-10 crashed while landing in dense fog at Shannon Airport, killing 30 passengers. She was en route to study in the United States before attending the University of Oxford.

Thompson was appointed MBE in 1969 and OBE in 2003.

Doris Thompson died on 23 June 2004 in Barnacre, on the day of her late son's funeral. She was 101 years old.
