= Launch Pad (Blackpool Pleasure Beach) =

S&S Worldwide drop tower ride at Pleasure Beach Resort in Blackpool, England

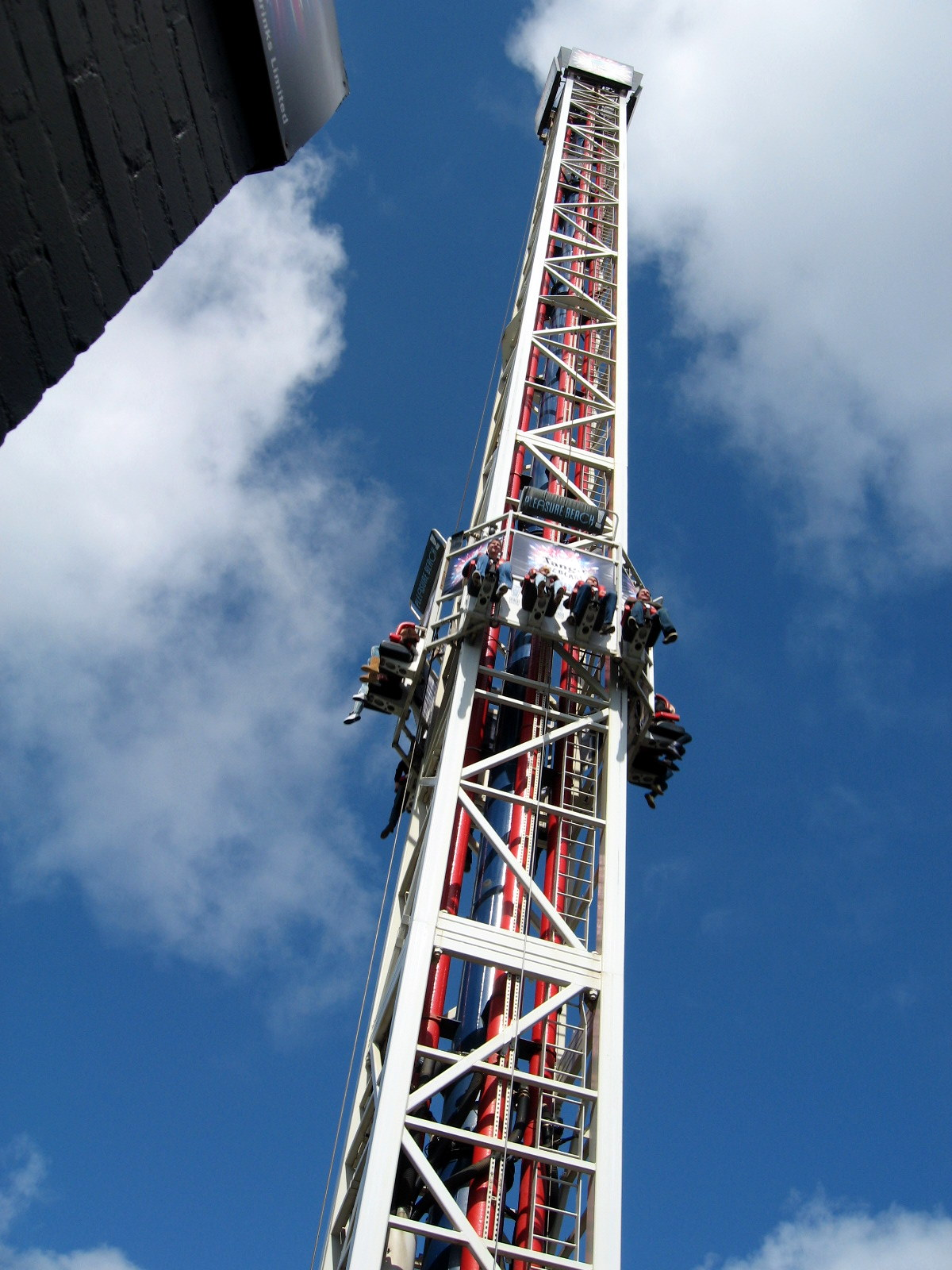

Pleasure Beach Resort
- Status: Operating
- Cost: £2,000,000
- Opening date: 1997

Ride statistics
- Attraction type: Space Shot
- Manufacturer: S&S Worldwide
- Height: 180 ft (55 m)
- Speed: 80 mph (130 km/h)
- G-force: 4.5
- Duration: 1:30
- Height restriction: 52 in (132 cm)

Launch Pad (formerly Ice Blast: The Ride, Tango Ice Blast and PlayStation: The Ride!) is an S&S Worldwide drop tower ride at Pleasure Beach Resort (better known as Blackpool Pleasure Beach) in Blackpool, England. It is 55 metres (150 ft) tall, and drops at 130 km/h (80 mph). It is the fastest and second-tallest drop tower in the United Kingdom, after The Volcano at Fantasy Island.

== History ==
=== PlayStation: The Ride ===
At some point prior to 1997, Pleasure Beach Resort decided to purchase a drop tower. When Sony approached the park as a potential sponsor for the ride, it was decided that the ride would tie in with the then-current success of Sony PlayStation products. The ride would open to the public in 1997, replacing a flat ride called Monster!. It was the first of its kind in the United Kingdom.

The tower was painted white, with the interior structure painted red, and the platform painted grey, black, and amber: the colours associated with PlayStation. Banners advertising PlayStation were placed on the ride vehicle, and the top of the tower featured the PlayStation logo.

=== Tango Ice Blast and Ice Blast: The Ride ===
In 2002, the ride was renamed Ice Blast upon receiving a new sponsor, and in 2004 was named Tango Ice Blast, in conjunction with the drink of the same name. The ride underwent changes to its ride vehicle's seating arrangement as well.

On 2 March 2024, Amanda Thompson, director of Pleasure Beach Resort, announced that the ride would be closed for the 2024 season as they awaited the arrival of a new part for the ride. All branding was removed, as well as the queue rails. A spokesperson for Pleasure Beach Resort announced that the ride would remain after renovation.

=== Launch Pad ===
On 10 December 2024, the park announced that Ice Blast: The Ride would be renovated and rethemed as Launch Pad for the 2025 season. The ride is now space-themed, and received a new pressure cylinder. The ride was also repainted to a blue colour scheme with red accents.

== Ride experience ==
Riders are restrained using over-the-shoulder restraints and a seatbelt. There is a blast of compressed air which sends the gondola to the top of the 55 metre (180 ft) tower, before it falls back down at 130 km/h (80 mph). This is followed by a second blast, in which the gondola is sent two-thirds of the way up the tower, and a final blast of air, sending the gondola one-third of the way up the tower. During the descent, the riders experience weightlessness. Riders are subjected to a maximum of 4.5 Gs during the ride. A full ride experience on Launch Pad lasts approximately one minute and 30 seconds.
