= Windjammer Surf Racers =

Defunct roller coaster

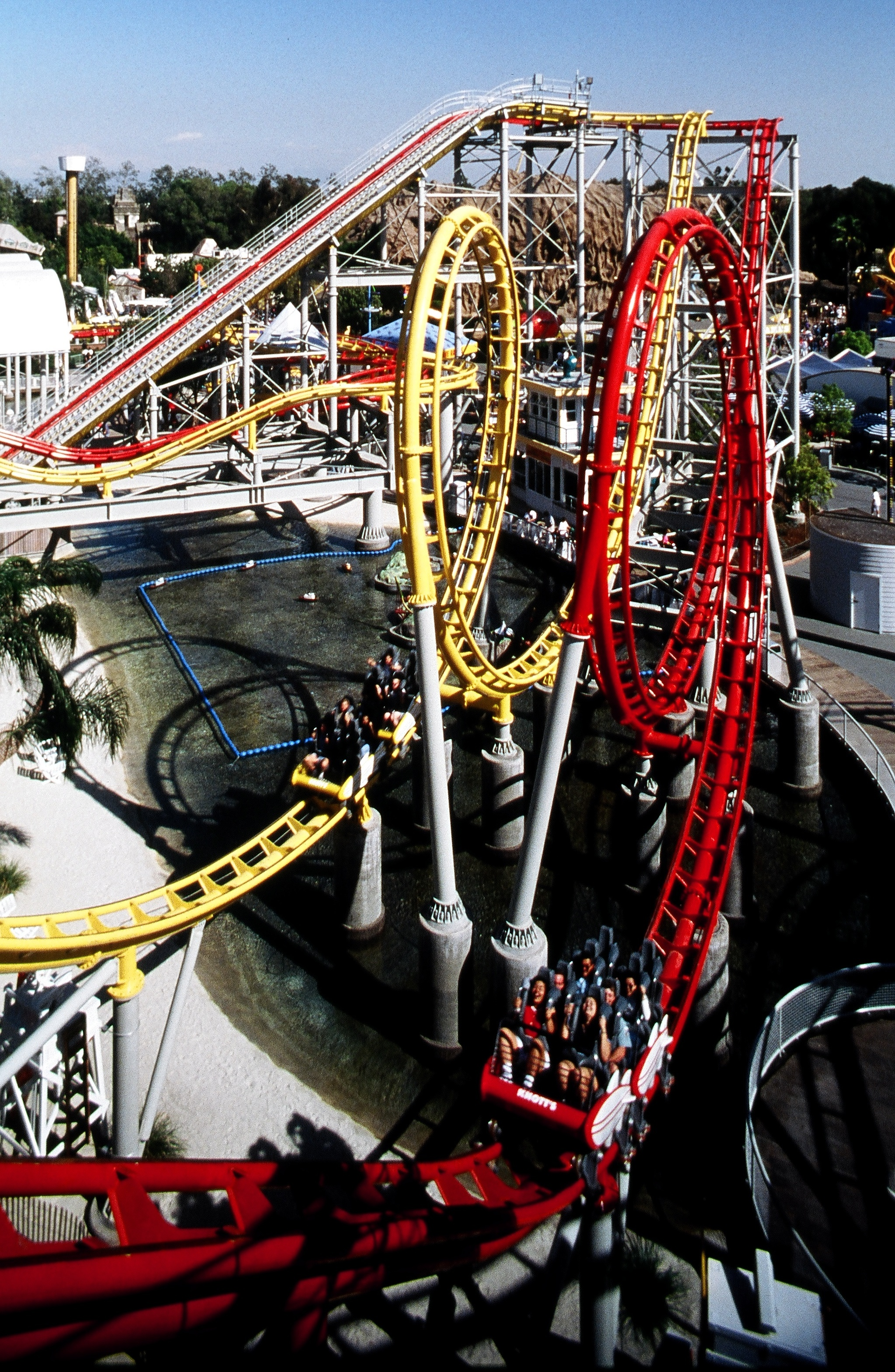

Knott's Berry Farm
- Park section: The Boardwalk
- Coordinates: 33°50′45″N 118°00′03″W
- Status: Removed
- Opening date: March 26, 1997
- Closing date: March 2, 2000
- Cost: $6,200,000
- Replaced: Wacky Soap Box Racers
- Replaced by: Xcelerator

General statistics
- Type: Steel – Wild Mouse – Racing
- Manufacturer: TOGO
- Designer: TOGO
- Model: Looping Mouse
- Track layout: Custom
- Lift/launch system: Chain lift hill
	Red	Yellow
Height	69 ft (21.0 m)	69 ft (21.0 m)
Drop	54 ft (16.5 m)	31 ft (9.4 m)
Length	1,851 ft (564.2 m)	1,839 ft (560.5 m)
Speed	40 mph (64.4 km/h)	40 mph (64.4 km/h)
Inversions	1	1
Duration	1:30	1:30
Max vertical angle	42°	42°
- Capacity: 1400 riders per hour
- Height restriction: 48 in (122 cm)
- Trains: 10 trains with 2 cars. Riders are arranged 2 across in 2 rows for a total of 8 riders per train.
- Windjammer Surf Racers at RCDB; Pictures of Windjammer Surf Racers at RCDB

Windjammer Surf Racers was a steel racing roller coaster located at Knott's Berry Farm amusement park in Buena Park, California. It sat on the former spot of Wacky Soap Box Racers. The ride was plagued with mechanical issues and only operated sporadically from 1997 to 2000, leading to a lawsuit being filed against the manufacturer, TOGO.

== History ==
On September 26, 1996, Knott's Berry Farm announced a new roller coaster for the 1997 season called Windjammer Surf Racers. It opened to the public on March 26, 1997. Windjammer experienced mechanical issues early on. Within a few weeks of operation, the ride needed several major repairs costing over $2 million. It also quickly gained a negative reputation for being rough, as the over-the-shoulder restraints lacked padding. The racing coaster would also frequently stall in reportedly "slight breezes".

In 1999, an apparel company challenged the coaster's name, which was temporarily changed to Jammer until the dispute was resolved. In 2000, Knott's Berry Farm filed a lawsuit against the manufacturer TOGO, seeking $17 million in damages. Knott's reported that, due to design and engineering flaws, there were problems including misaligned and poorly designed tracks, faulty restraint system, and buckling in the chassis of the trains; it was also alleged that, as a result, that the ride would stall even during slight breezes and faced frequent downtimes during moderate winds, which Knott's called an "embarrassment." The ride remained closed during the lawsuit as evidence, but Knott's was unable to complete a sale of the ride. TOGO shut their American offices down in March 2001 after filing for Chapter 7 bankruptcy.

In June 2001, the park erected construction walls surrounding Windjammer Surf Racers, and the nearby Headspin scrambler ride was relocated. Windjammer was demolished the following month in July 2001. A hydraulically-launched roller coaster, Xcelerator, was built in its place for the following season.

In November 2003, the jury rejected Knott's lawsuit in favor of TOGO International.

== Ride experience ==
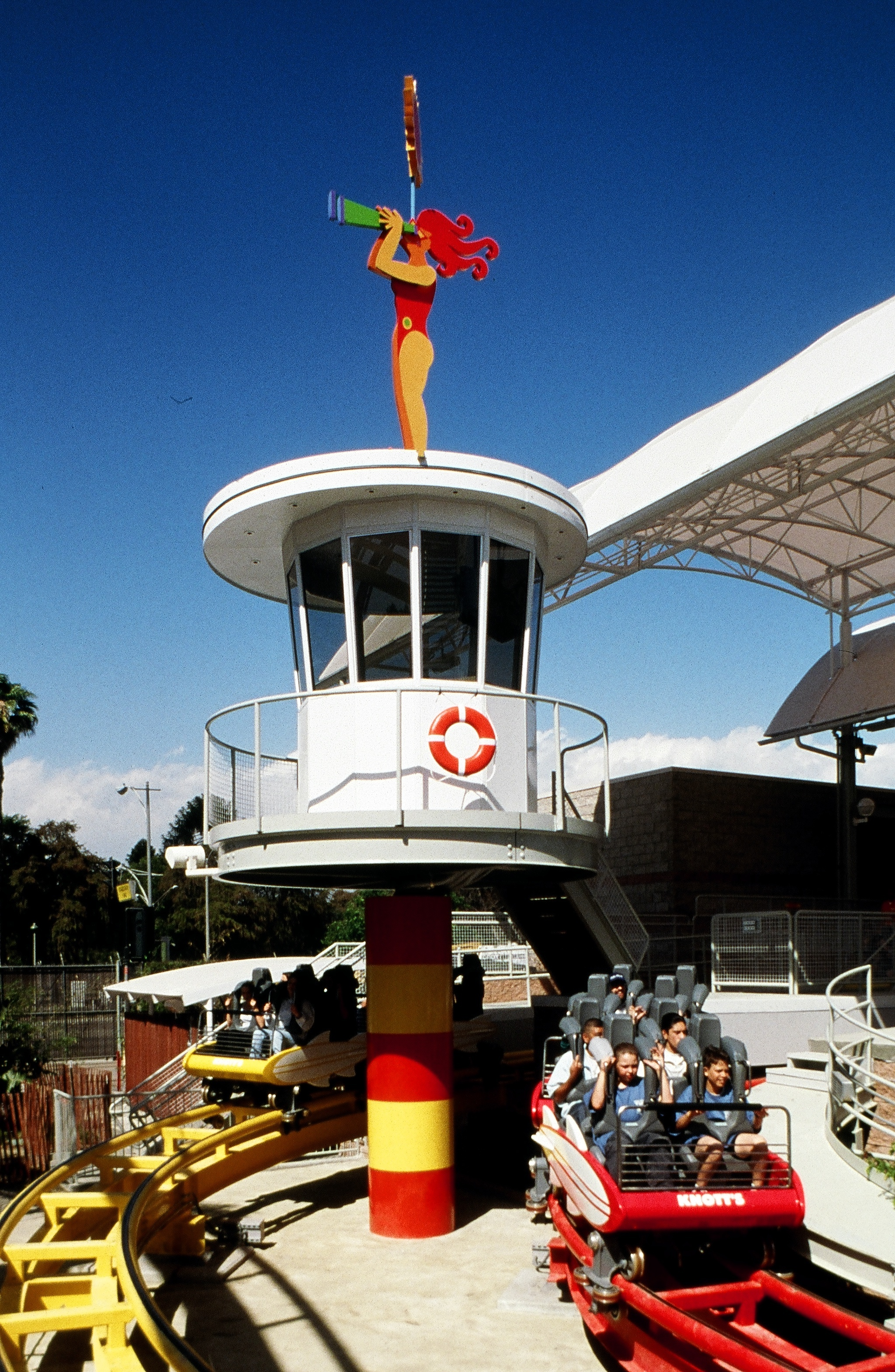
Trains exiting the station

Windjammer Surf Racers was a unique coaster; it involved small Wild Mouse-like trains running on a full size track. There were two independent tracks (red and yellow) that were constructed parallel to each other, in which the purpose of the ride was to pit both tracks in a race against each other. The coaster's rider load/unloading platform did not have an airgate system to keep queuing guests clear from advancing vehicles within the station.

The ride was dressed as a tribute to the fabled Southern California beach and surf culture, complete with towering palm trees, beach sand, a miniature lagoon, a scaled-down lifeguard watch tower, and other beach-worthy props. The on-ride photograph sales booth was built into the side of a scaled-down replica of a yacht.

The attraction featured a unique interactive element built into the center of the helix finale, known as the “spiral cone.” The spiral cone consisted of motorized fans semi-enclosed within a steel conical housing structure. The mechanism was designed to simulate a wind effect - giving riders the sensation of being caught in the eye of a Pacific storm. However, the special effect failed to work as intended, and remained inoperable for most of the ride’s service life.

=== Layout ===
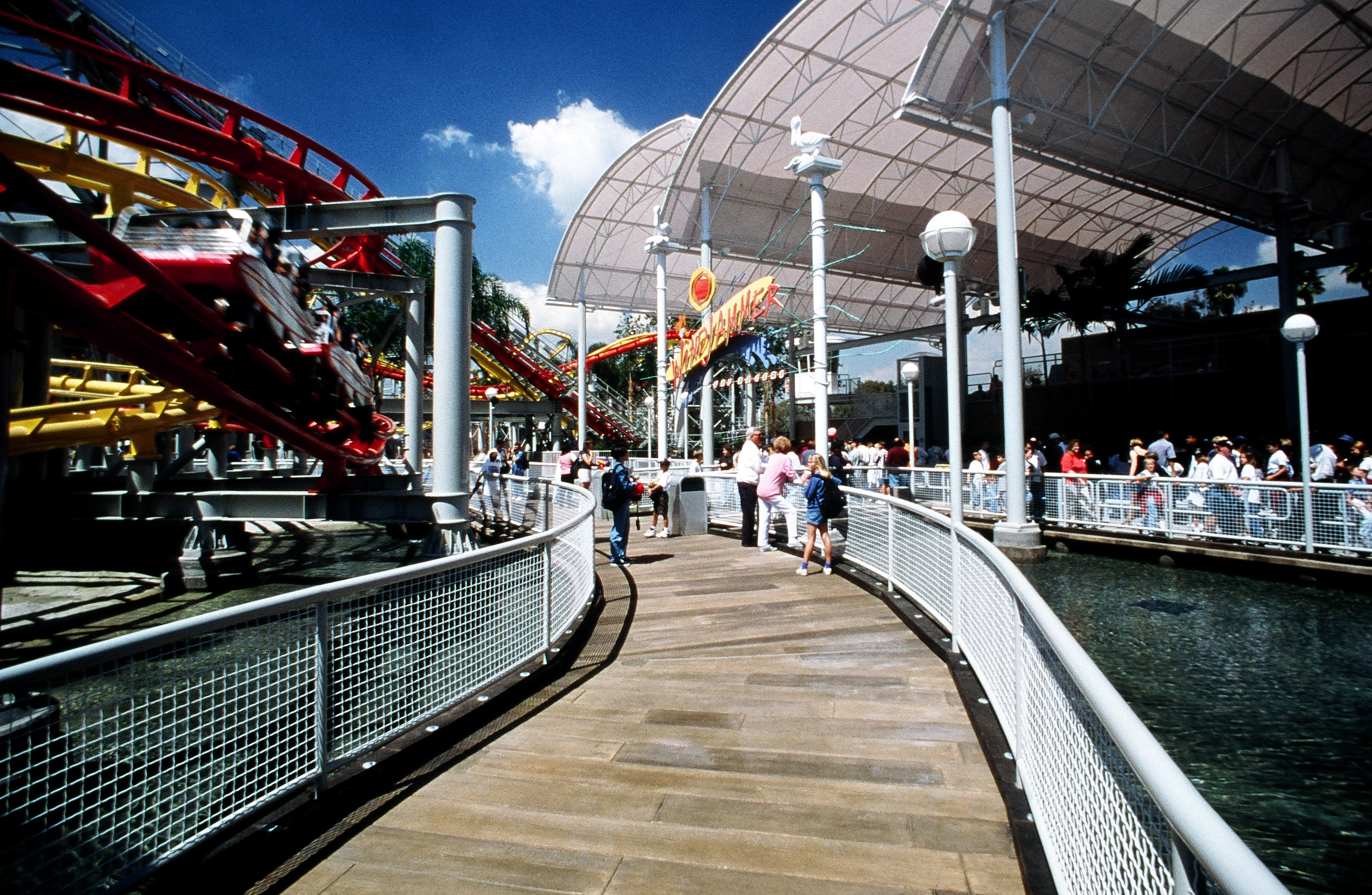
Boardwalk view

After both trains exited the station, they headed up a 69-foot (21 m) chain lift hill. A right turn led into a drop on both tracks. After reaching the bottom of each drop, both sides reached a maximum speed of 40 mph (64 km/h) before entering a vertical loop. The trains went through several turns and drops and a helix finale before stopping on the final brake run and returning to the station.
