= Nicholas Thompson (businessman) =

British businessman

Nick Thompson
- Born: Nicholas William Robert Thompson
- Occupation: Businessman
- Known for: deputy managing director of Pleasure Beach Resort
- Parent: Geoffrey Thompson (father)

Nicholas William Robert Thompson is a British businessman who is the deputy managing director of Pleasure Beach Resort (better known as Blackpool Pleasure Beach). He rose to the position following the death of his father in 2004.

== Career highlights ==
During Nick Thompson's tenure, he has been involved in the installation of many major attractions at Pleasure Beach Resort.

Attraction	Seasons active	Year	
Attraction	Seasons active	2000s	2010s
Infusion	19	2007–present	
Nickelodeon Land	15		2011–present
Wallace & Gromit's Thrill-O-Matic	13		2013–present
Icon	8		2018–present

== Personal life ==
Nick married his fiancé Stina Dahslrud in a private ceremony in 2004. He was previously married to Stacey, with whom he had two children.
