= Xcelerator =

Roller coaster at Knott's Berry Farm

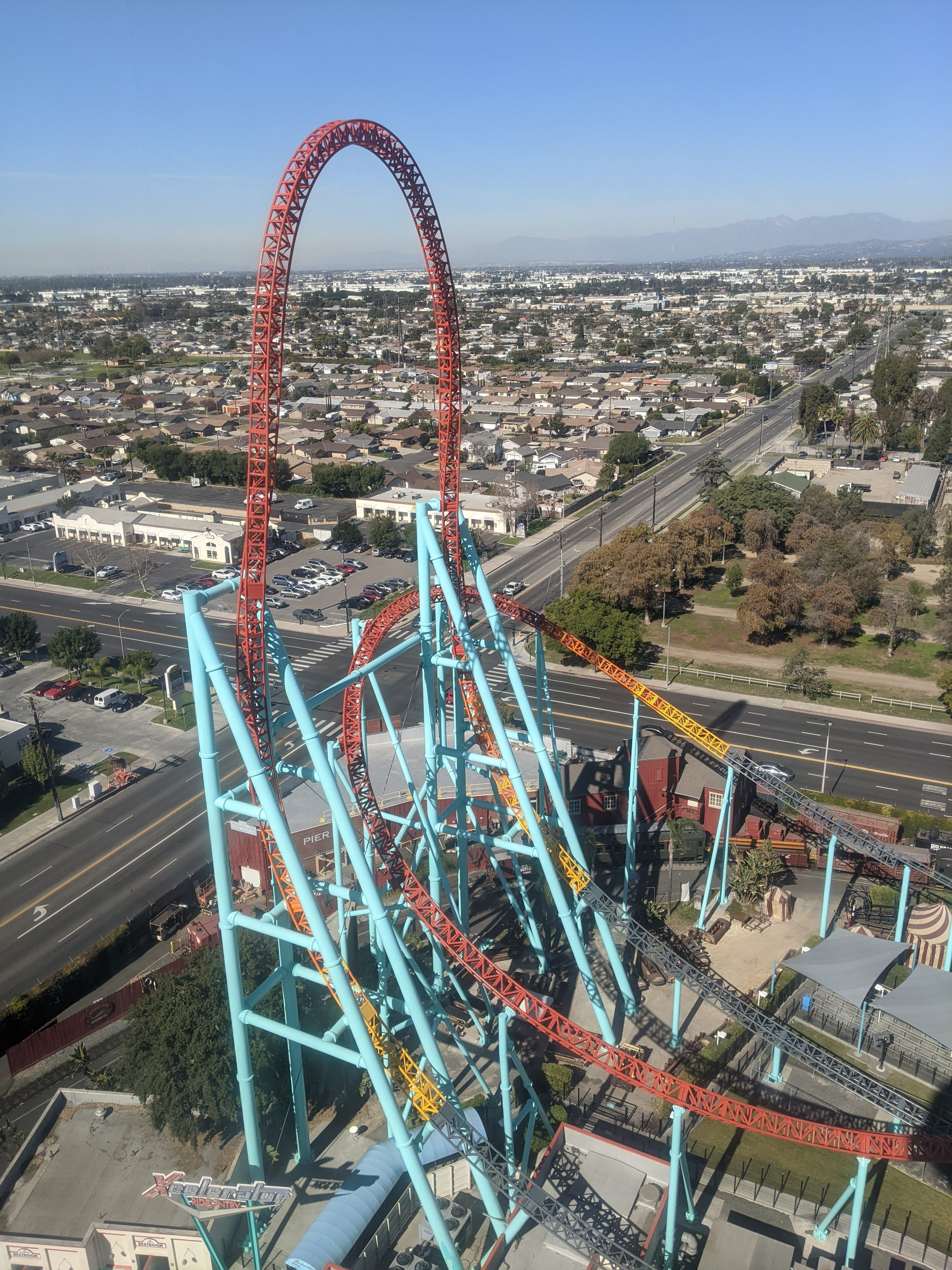

Knott's Berry Farm
- Location: Knott's Berry Farm
- Park section: The Boardwalk
- Coordinates: 33°50′45″N 118°00′03″W
- Status: Operating
- Opening date: June 22, 2002
- Cost: $13 million
- Replaced: Windjammer Surf Racers

General statistics
- Type: Steel – Launched
- Manufacturer: Intamin
- Designer: Werner Stengel
- Model: Accelerator Coaster
- Lift/launch system: Hydraulic launch
- Height: 205 ft (62 m)
- Length: 2,202 ft (671 m)
- Speed: 82 mph (132 km/h)
- Inversions: 0
- Duration: 1:02
- Max vertical angle: 90°
- Capacity: 1330 riders per hour
- Acceleration: 0 to 82 mph (0 to 132 km/h) in 2.3 seconds
- Trains: 2 trains with 5 cars; riders arranged 2 across in 2 rows for a total of 20 riders per train
- Fast Lane available
- Xcelerator at RCDB

Xcelerator is a steel launched roller coaster located at Knott's Berry Farm in Buena Park, California, United States. Manufactured by Intamin and designed by Werner Stengel, it opened in 2002 as the company's first hydraulically launched coaster and cost $13 million to construct. Following the early demise of Windjammer Surf Racers, a dueling roller coaster that briefly operated from 1997 to 2000, Xcelerator was soon announced as its replacement. It launches to a maximum speed of 82 mph (132 km/h) in 2.3 seconds and reaches a height of 205 feet (62 m), and has a short twister section that leads into the brake run. In 2009, a tragic accident occurred that severely injured a 12 year-old boy because the launch cable snapped. The ride reopened in 2010 after multiple inspections and brand new safety measures.

== History ==
Following the demise of the short-lived Windjammer Surf Racers, a dueling roller coaster plagued with issues surrounding its design and operation, Knott's Berry Farm announced its replacement in December 2001. The park hired Intamin to build and design a new roller coaster called Xcelerator, the company's first hydraulically launched roller coaster, which uses pressurized oil and a series of hydraulic fluid chambers to rapidly propel a coaster train along a straight section of track. The total cost was $13 million. Intamin pioneered the hydraulic technology used on Xcelerator, which would later be built on a larger scale on future record-breaking rides, including Top Thrill Dragster at Cedar Point and Kingda Ka at Six Flags Great Adventure. The ride was originally scheduled to open in May 2002, but the opening was delayed to June 22, 2002.

In May 2004, California investigators asked that Knott's Berry Farm temporarily close Xcelerator, and that sister park Six Flags Magic Mountain close Superman: The Escape, because the T-bar restraint systems used by both rides were potentially defective. This was due to three incidents where people died after falling out of the restraints, including Superman – Ride of Steel at Six Flags New England. The rides were closed on June 2, 2004, so the necessary modifications could be made; Xcelerator reopened at the end of the month. After an incident in 2009, the ride was closed while it underwent investigation; it reopened in April 2010.

Xcelerator was closed in July 2017 for maintenance. The ride eventually reopened in March 2018. It closed near the end of October 2021 for a new coat of paint; the ride now has the colors red, gray, orange, and yellow. Xcelerator closed again in mid-March 2022 due to a delayed shipment of a part. The park later announced that the ride would be reopening during the summer of 2023.

In 2025, the ride got a controls system upgrade. This included minor changes, with the fault light now blinking on the ride operator panel when there is a fault. The ride also got the drag light sequence changed. This happened when the ride went down because a sensor for the catchcar needed to be replaced, which had caused much downtime in the two weeks before.

== Characteristics ==
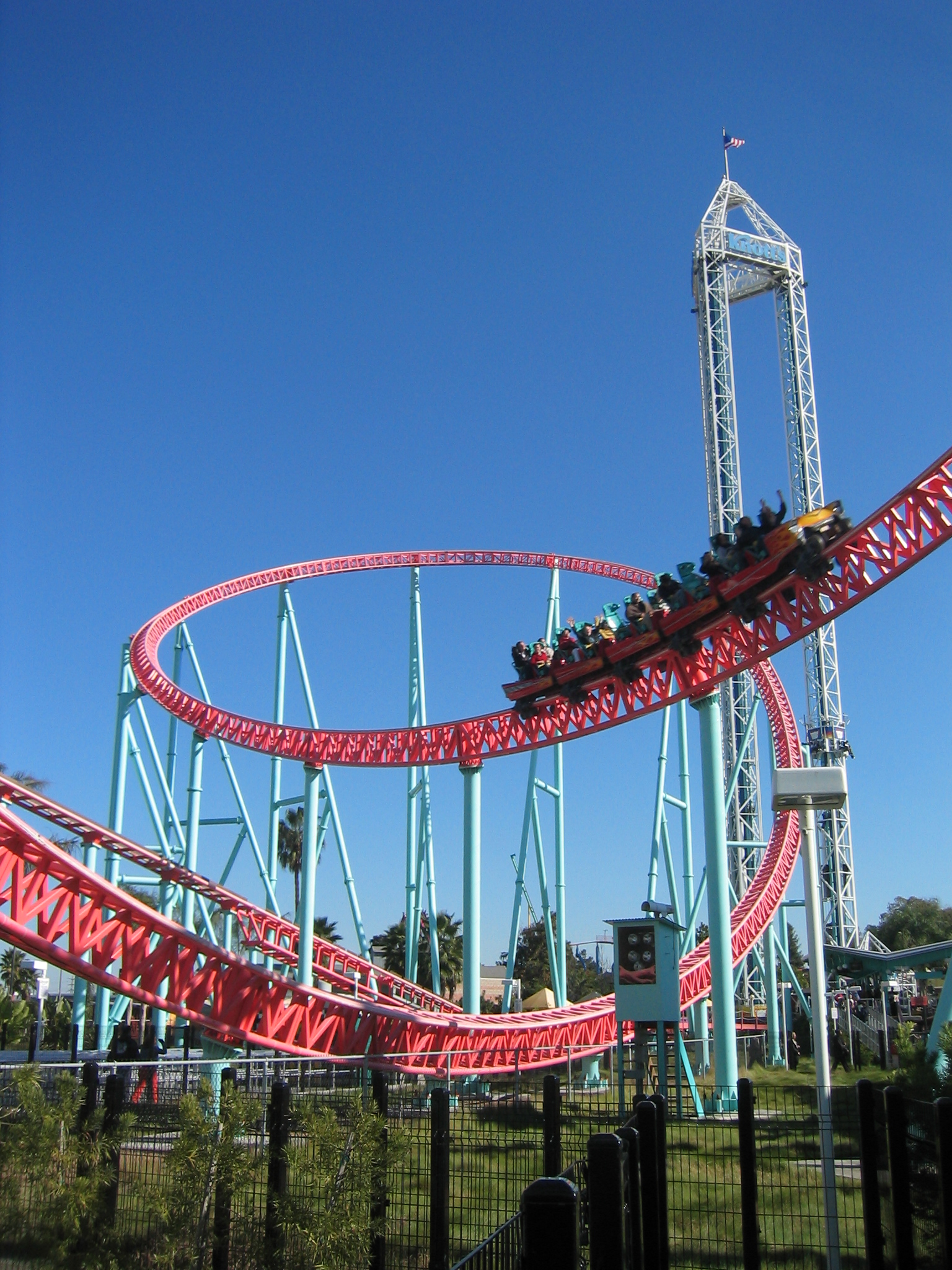
Xcelerator's Red Train exits the first overbanked turn.

Xcelerator features two trains: red and purple. The trains themselves have spring-loaded wheel assemblies and are standard Intamin trains with specially crafted shells to make them look like 1957 Chevrolet Bel Air convertibles. Each train can fit 20 people; there are five cars per train, which each sit two people in two rows. This gives the ride an advertised capacity of 1,330 riders per hour.

The red train was accidentally painted with its color scheme reversed when the ride opened. It featured a yellow color scheme with red flames in the front and side, instead of a red train with yellowish flames. During one of the ride's rehabs, the color scheme was corrected by repainting the red train with orange flames added to the front and sides. After an accident in 2009, the red train now features patriotic blue flames. Each train is five cars long and holds twenty passengers. A maximum of two trains can operate at any given time. However, the two train operation is only slightly more efficient than only using one train. Therefore, Xcelerator usually only operates with one train regardless of the number of people in the park. Instead, each train is used by itself for about a year, while the other is undergoing maintenance. When maintenance is completed on one of the trains, it is returned to active duty and the other train is sent to maintenance. The trains can run up to 16 months before needing to be disassembled and reinspected, per new rules with Intamin.

=== Restraints ===
Xcelerator's trains use hydraulically operated T-Bar restraints. These restraints are featured on Intamin's earlier accelerator coaster models. However, over-the-shoulder restraints are now used on the newer models due to safety concerns. Xcelerator also had special light meters installed on the restraints. The meter must show all green in order for a guest to ride. If the meter shows red then the guest cannot ride. Eventually the meter system was removed and the park used black dots etched on the side of each restraint. The restraint was yellow at this point so that the seatbelt, seat, and lap bar wouldn't blend in with each other. This was changed in February 2025, with new black lap bars debuting on the red train. This featured new red dots on the side of the lap bar. The red dot must pass the first bar on the side of the seat frame in order for the guest to ride. The ride also has seat belts that must be buckled before an operator pulls down the lap bar. Failure to do so slows the load time considerably on the new black restraints, as the seatbelt, lapbar, and seat are very similar colors. Another contributing factor involves the seat belts and a guest not being able to ride is requirement of one inch of slack must be pulled from the seat belt.

=== Ride experience ===
Xcelerator's hydraulic catapult motor accelerates the train from 0 to 82 mph (132 km/h) in 2.3 seconds. It only uses 157 feet (48 m) of track to launch the train. Each of the twin hydraulic catapult motors achieves a maximum of 10,500 horsepower (7,800 kW) during the launch of the train. Xcelerator's hydraulic motor system has the mechanical capability of accelerating vehicles to a speed of 117 mph (188 km/h) or more, as tested for Top Thrill Dragster, although less power is needed for the train to crest the hill.

In order for a train to launch, the catch car must first roll back slightly into position. Then, the train must "drift" back to "hook" on to a catch car. 24 volts are used to demagnetize a pin underneath the third car, which causes it to drop. At the same time, two bellows actuators fill up with air. Meanwhile, near the back of the train, two drive tires that are holding the train in place must retract. The brakes then lower while the train rolls back, allowing it to hook onto the 7-foot-long (2.1 m) catch car. Once connected, the motor engages to launch the train. The catch car passes over a set of magnetic brakes, and the motor must work harder to attain proper launch speed if the train is not fully loaded with passengers. From the time the launch begins, the train has 8.25 seconds to pass over a proximity switch, called a Hall-effect sensor, near the bottom of the first drop which clears the starting block. This time isn't usually followed, as the train often passes over the sensor anywhere between 7 to 10 seconds after launch. This is because the purple train is slightly heavier than the red train, causing both trains to run at noticeably different speeds when running two trains.

After launching, the train climbs a vertical 205 ft (62 m) top hat element, then soars through two banked turns of 110 ft (34 m) and 95 ft (29 m), respectively. It then reaches the brake run and returns to the station house. The magnetic braking system consists of mounted magnetic clippers on the trains and copper alloy fins mounted onto the track. The alloy fins on the launch section retract during the launch procedure so as to not interfere with the train.

=== Rollbacks ===
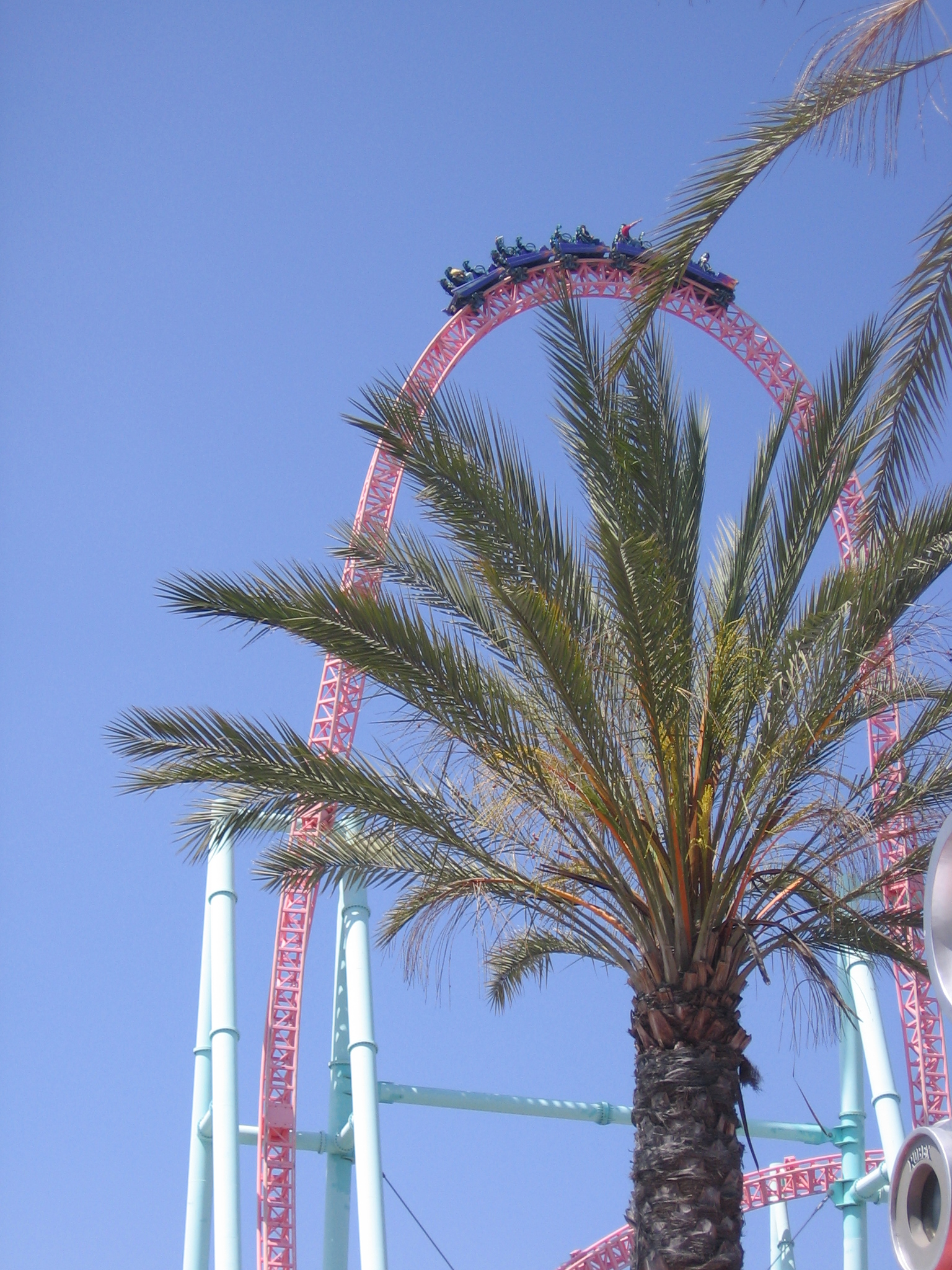
A train nearly stalls at the top of the hill.

In rare cases, a train will not attain enough speed to make it over the initial 205-foot (62 m) top hat element. This causes the train to partially ascend the tower, stall, and roll back onto the launch track where magnetic brake fins will stop the train. The ride is designed to handle rollbacks. Inclement weather, weight, and overheating are all factors that contribute to a rollback. Trains cannot advance into the station until the train in front of them clears a proximity sensor on the first drop. The ride's operating panel has the "start block" blinking when the train is on the tophat and waiting for the ride to rollback or not.

== Awards ==
Golden Ticket Awards: Top steel Roller Coasters
Year									1998	1999
Ranking									–	–
Year	2000	2001	2002	2003	2004	2005	2006	2007	2008	2009
Ranking	–	–	49	35	36	38	35	24 (tie)	37	42
Year	2010	2011	2012	2013	2014	2015	2016	2017	2018	2019
Ranking	–	–	–	–	–	–	–	–	–	–
Year	2020	2021	2022	2023	2024	2025	2026			
Ranking	N/A	–	–	–	–	–	–			

== Incidents ==
- On September 16, 2009, a cable snapped during the launch of the ride, sending metal debris flying and seriously lacerating the leg of a 12-year-old boy. Another adult male rider complained of neck and back pain. A state investigation determined that the accident could have been avoided with more frequent inspections. The park only inspected the ride every six months, even though Intamin had recommended an inspection every month; Knott's Berry Farm was nearly three weeks behind on their regular six-month inspection. The state described the recommended maintenance inspection interval in the instructions, which Intamin provided Knott's Berry Farm, as confusing and unclear. Knott's Berry Farm and the boy's family agreed to an out-of-court settlement in 2011.

== See also ==
- Accelerator Coaster, The type of roller coaster that Xcelerator is.
- Top Thrill Dragster, a similar roller coaster at Cedar Point
- Kingda Ka, a similar roller coaster at Six Flags Great Adventure that was disassembled in early 2025.
- Stealth, a similar roller coaster at Thorpe Park with the same height of 205 ft (62m)
