= Amanda Thompson (businesswoman) =

British businesswoman

Amanda Thompson OBE
- Born: Amanda Jean Thompson; September 1962 (age 63); Islington, England, UK
- Occupation: Businesswoman
- Spouse: Steve Thompson (2004–present)
- Parent(s): Geoffrey Thompson; Barbara Thompson

Amanda Jean Thompson OBE (born September 1962) is a British businesswoman who is the managing director of Pleasure Beach Resort (better known as Blackpool Pleasure Beach), president of Stageworks Worldwide Productions, director of Big Blue Hotel and the Boulevard Hotel, and a patron of the Grand Theatre and Blackpool Civic Trust.

She rose to the position of managing director of Pleasure Beach Resort in 2004 after the death of her father, Geoffrey Thompson.

== Career ==
Thompson went to a private school in Oxford, then worked for Disney before producing her first ice show in 1982.

Thompson was appointed managing director of Blackpool Pleasure Beach in 2004, following the death of her father and grandmother. Her brother, Nicholas Thompson became the deputy managing director. Her sister, Fiona Gilje (nee Thompson) is a board director.

Thompson has been a prominent individual within the attractions industries global community and has been involved with the International Association of Amusement Parks and Attractions (IAAPA), chairing the Europe, Middle East and Africa committee (EMEA) for numerous years. Currently she holds a place on the EMEA Advisory Committee.

She was nominated to the IAAPA board of directors in 2018 and led the global attractions industry as chairman of the board in 2020 and 2021, being the first European woman to do so, as well as being the first person to chair the association for two consecutive years.

== Personal life ==
Thompson was born in Islington, London. She was awarded an OBE in the 2012 New Year Honours.
