= Steeplechase (Blackpool Pleasure Beach) =

British steel single rail roller coaster

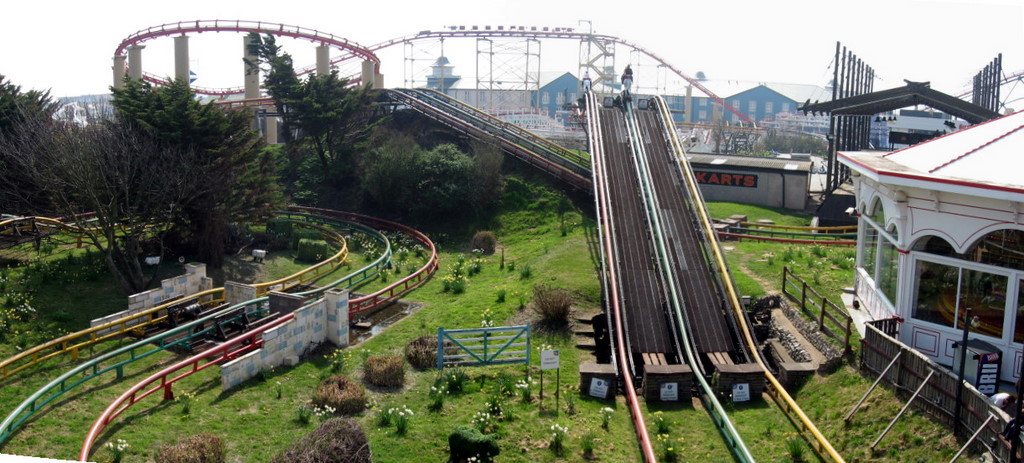

Pleasure Beach Resort
- Location: Pleasure Beach Resort
- Coordinates: 53.7888°N 3.0558°W
- Status: Operating
- Opening date: 1977
- Cost: £813,000

General statistics
- Type: Steel – Racing – Steeplechase
- Manufacturer: Arrow Dynamics
- Height: 30 ft (9.1 m)
- Speed: 25 mph (40 km/h)
- Inversions: 0
- Height restriction: 50 in (127 cm)
- Tracks: 3
- Vehicles: 9 (3 on each side) cars. Riders are arranged inline in 2 rows for a total of 2 riders per car.
- Steeplechase at RCDB

Steeplechase is a tri-tracked steel racing steeplechase roller coaster at Pleasure Beach Resort (better known as Blackpool Pleasure Beach) in Blackpool, England.

It is a custom design built by Arrow Dynamics, and it cost £813,000. The ride opened in 1977 in a ceremony highlighted by Grand National winner Red Rum, whose hoof print was also taken and is on display near the ride's exit. It is the only operating steeplechase roller coaster left in the world.

Riders sit upon a horse-shaped vehicle which can seat one or two people in-line. Each track has two chain lift hills, and the tracks winds around part of Big Dipper and underneath part of Nickelodeon Streak. The station is located near The Big One in the south of the park. The ride features three coloured tracks: red, green, and yellow.

The ride is 9.1 metres (30 ft) tall, and reaches top speeds of 40 km/h (25 mph).

== Gallery ==
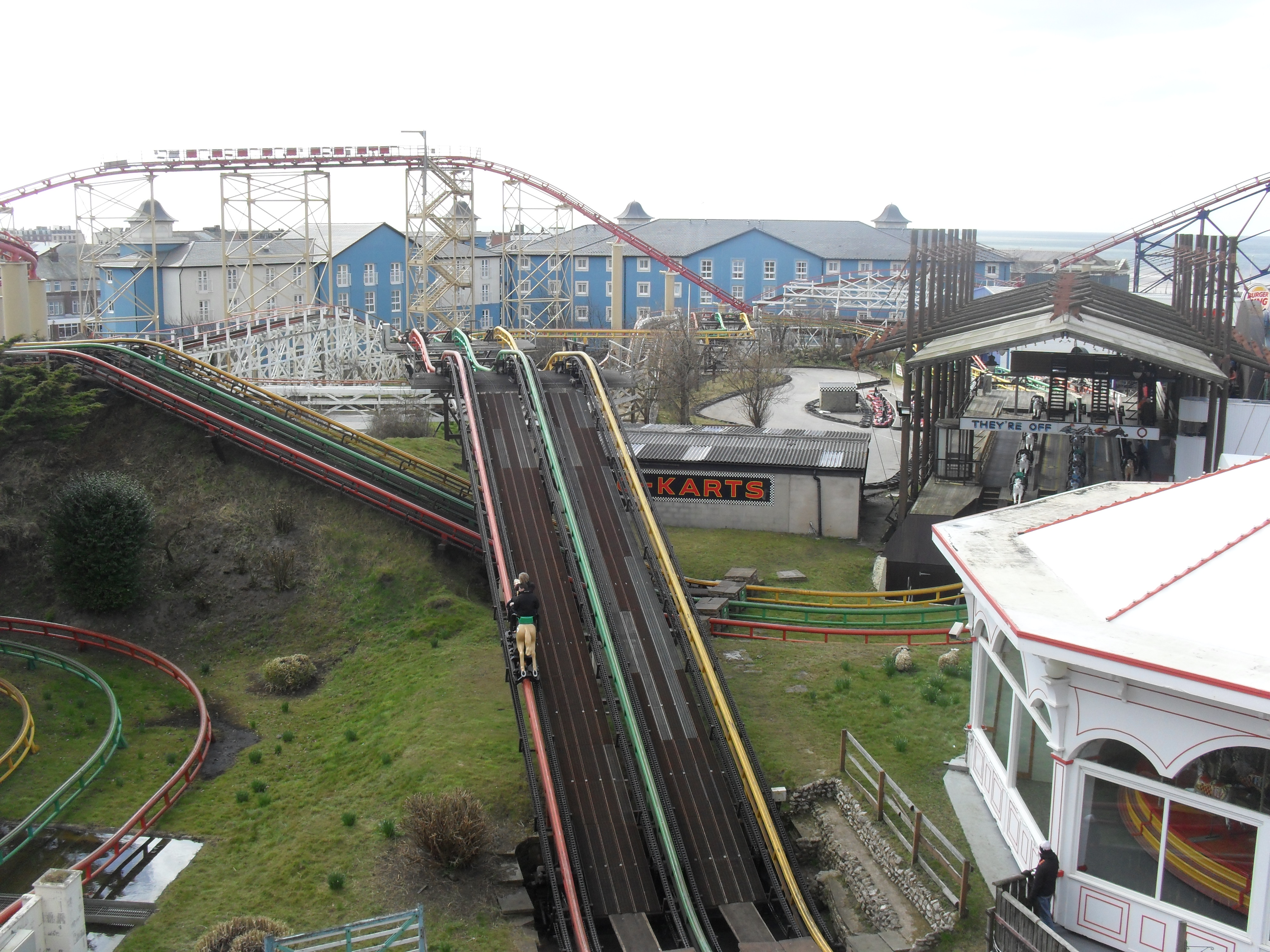
An aerial view of the ride

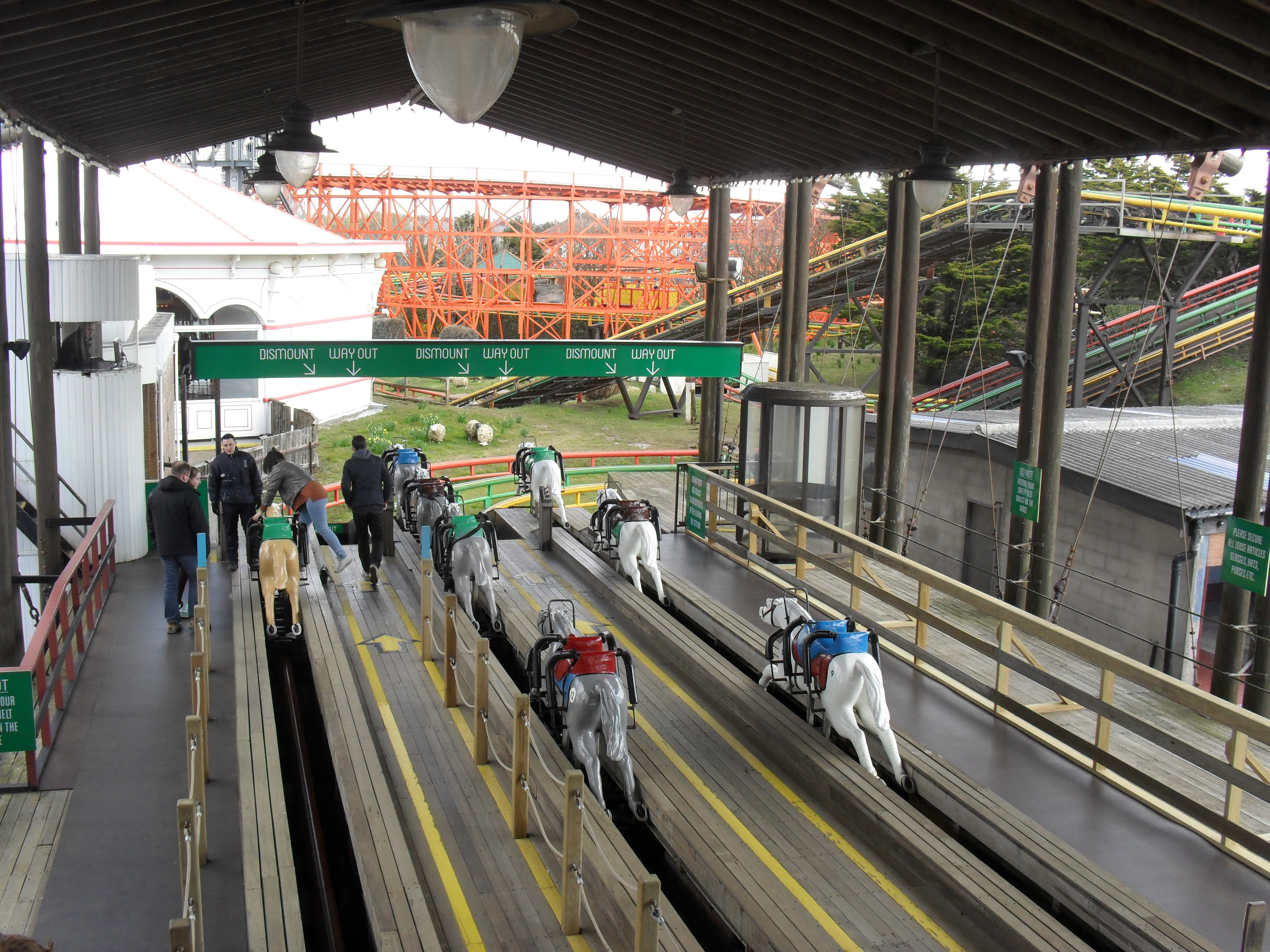
The ride's station

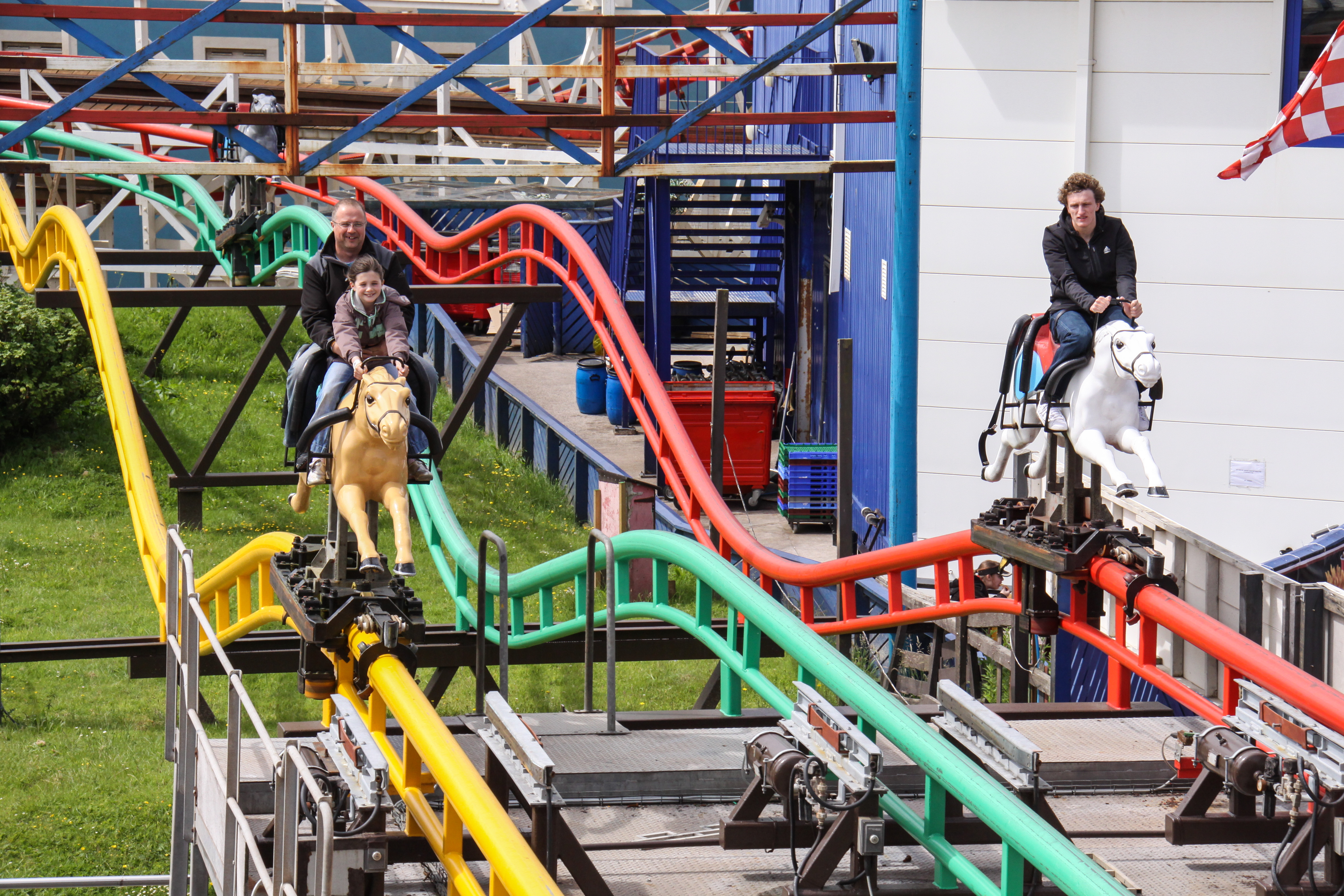
The ride in operation

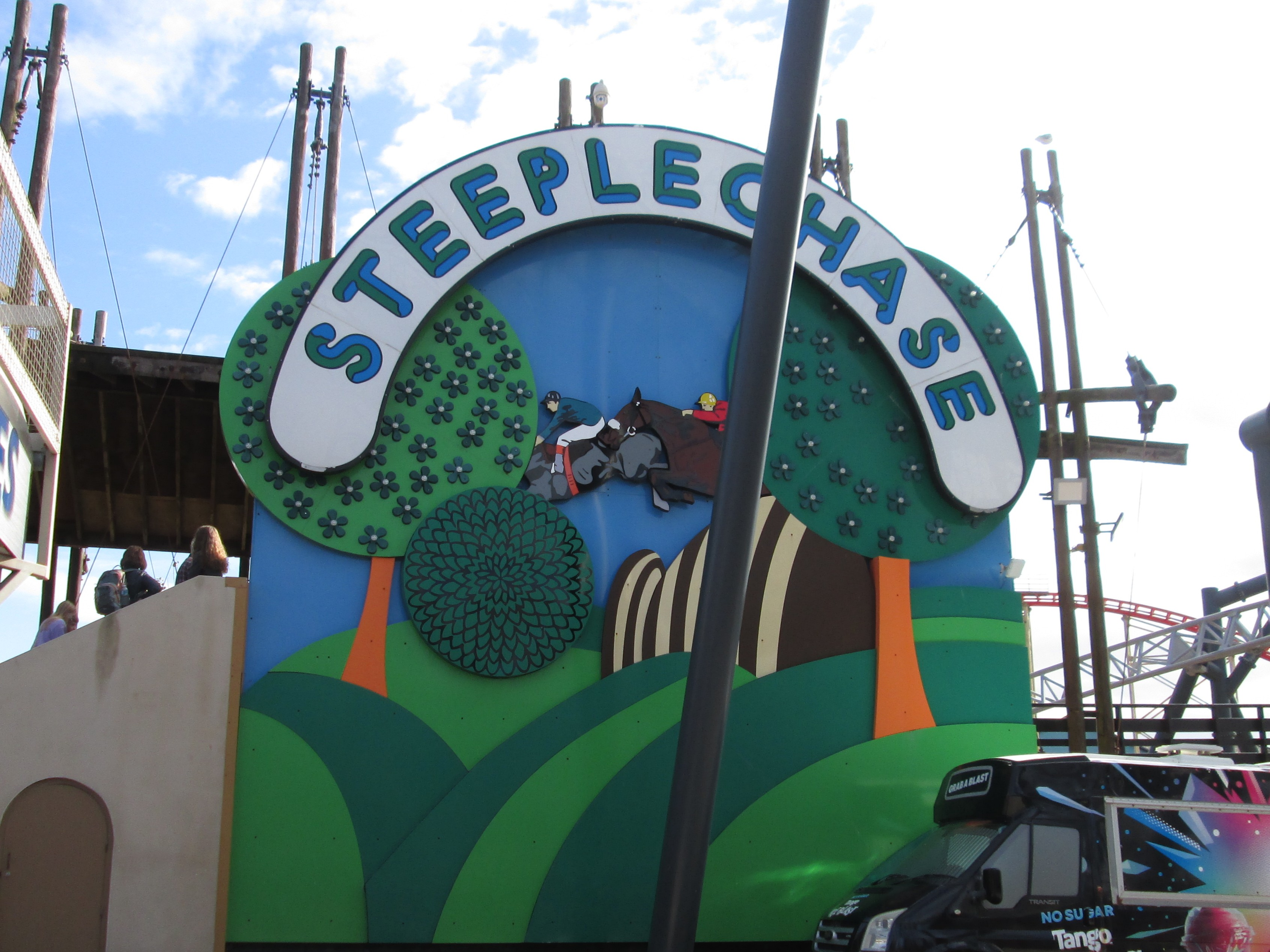
Wooden display at the front of the ride's station

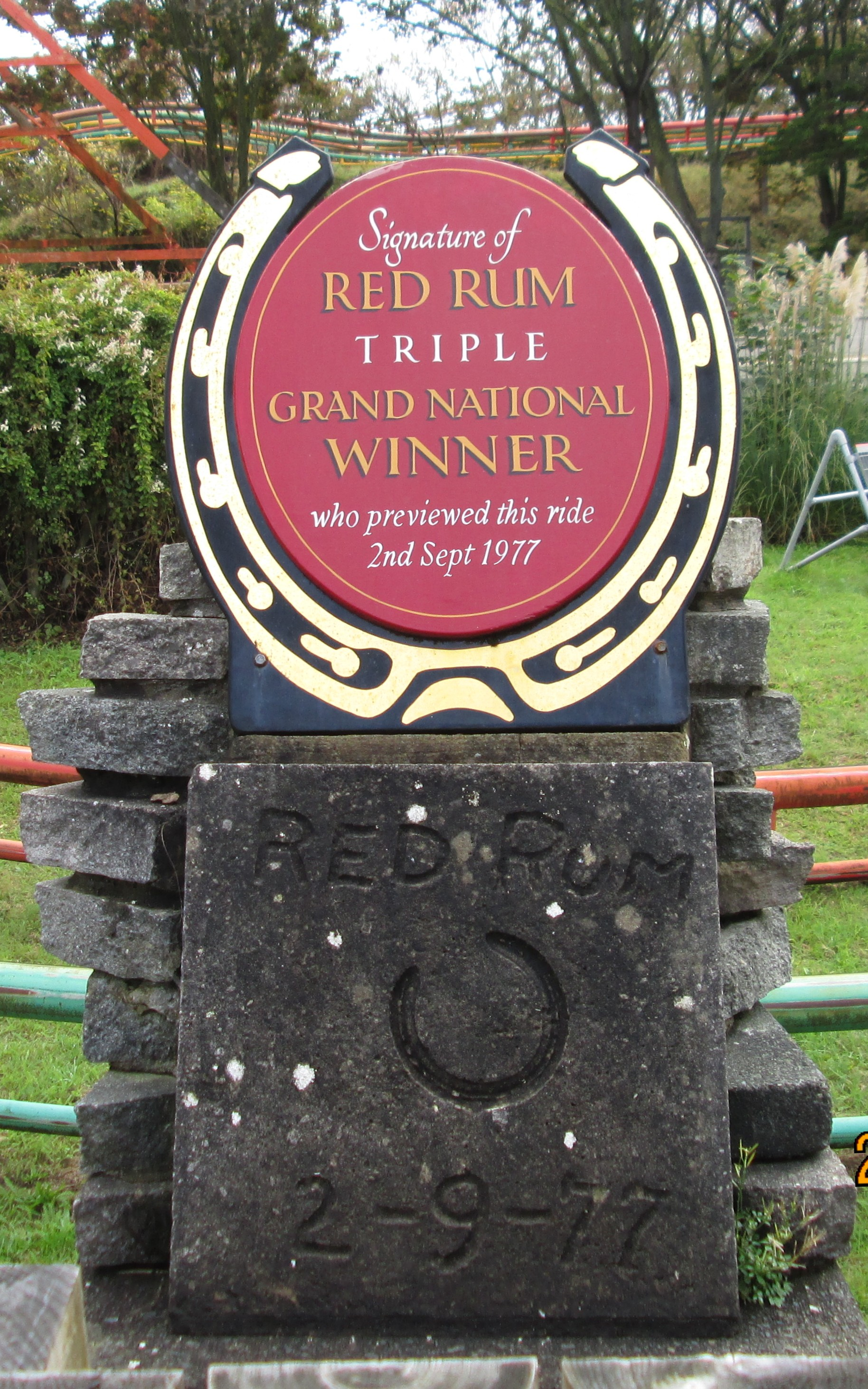
Red Rum's hoofprint located near the ride
