= Hot Ice Show =

Ice show at Pleasure Beach Resort

Coordinates: 53°47′25″N 3°03′20″W

The Hot Ice Show is a long-running ice show at Pleasure Beach Resort (better known as Blackpool Pleasure Beach) in Blackpool, England. The show has been at the park since 1936, when it began production as the Ice Parades. It is performed in the Pleasure Beach Arena, formerly the Ice Dome. Many notable skaters have performed in the shows over the years.

The show has only been unavailable for two years since its introduction. In 2009, it was unable to be performed due to work being done in the arena. In 2020, the show was cancelled due to the COVID-19 pandemic.
