= Max and Moritz (disambiguation) =

Max and Moritz is a German language illustrated story in verse, written and illustrated by Wilhelm Busch and published in 1865.

Max and Moritz may also refer to:

- Max and Moritz (film), a 1956 German musical film
- Max and Moritz (rockets), rockets launched in 1934 by Wernher von Braun
- Max & Moritz (roller coaster), a roller coaster in the Efteling amusement park in The Netherlands
- Max und Moritz Award, a German prize for comics, awarded at the International Comic Show in Erlangen since 1984
