= Avalanche (Blackpool Pleasure Beach) =

Steel bobsled roller coaster at Pleasure Beach Resort

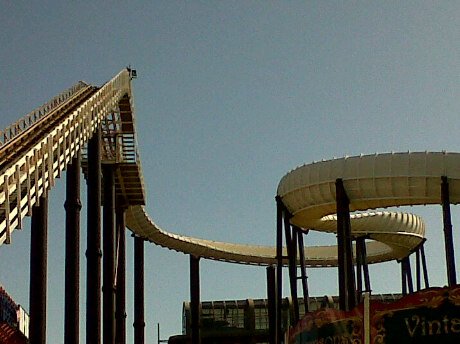

Pleasure Beach Resort
- Location: Pleasure Beach Resort
- Coordinates: 53°47′24″N 3°03′21″W
- Status: Operating
- Opening date: 22 June 1988
- Cost: £2,500,000

General statistics
- Type: Steel – Bobsled
- Manufacturer: Mack Rides
- Model: Bobsleigh
- Lift/launch system: Chain lift
- Height: 59 ft (18 m)
- Length: 1,161 ft (354 m)
- Speed: 45 mph (72 km/h)
- Inversions: 0
- Duration: 1:22
- G-force: 2.9
- Height restriction: 44 in (112 cm)
- Trains: 3 trains with 7 cars; riders arranged 1 across in 2 rows for a total of 14 riders per train
- Avalanche at RCDB

Avalanche is a steel bobsled roller coaster at Pleasure Beach Resort (better known as Blackpool Pleasure Beach) in Blackpool, England. It was the first bobsled coaster in the United Kingdom, and remains the only one in the country. It was designed and built by Mack Rides and opened in 1988.

== History ==
Avalanche opened to the public on 22 June 1988 in a ceremony hosted by Eddie "The Eagle" Edwards. It was the first bobsled roller coaster to be constructed in the United Kingdom, and the third bobsled coaster built by Mack Rides. A visit to the Mack family-owned Europa-Park, where the company's first bobsled coaster had already opened in 1985, inspired the creation of Avalanche.

Pleasure Beach Resort sponsored the British bobsleigh team during the 1988 Winter Olympics, and supported them by donating a portion of Avalanche ticket sales to the team.

In its first year of operation, Avalanche carried one million passengers.

== Ride experience ==
Upon dispatch, the train exits the station and enters the lift hill. At the top of the lift hill, the ride is released onto the main downhill track, which the ride is not physically held onto. It travels through various bobsled track style curves, picking up speed, before reaching the lowest curve and curving back up again. It then flattens out and travels into the first brake run, before the train travels around a bend and into the final brake run, after which it returns to the station.

The ride has 350 metres (1,160 ft) of track and the cars reach a top speed of around 72 km/h (45 mph). It has a maximum height of 18 metres (59 ft).

The ride has three trains consisting of seven cars each. Each car can hold two riders, for a total of 14 passengers per train. A maximum of only two trains can be operated at any given time. The trains are painted the same colours as the 1988 British Bobsled team.

== Theming ==
Avalanche is themed to an Alpine bobsled track. The station building was designed to look like an Alpine village lodge. The loading platform room is decorated with emblems of Swiss regions and pictures of famous Bobsled teams. Traditional Swiss music plays in the station and outside the station building. A bobsleigh used by the Great British team is displayed in the station building.

== Incidents ==
- On 29 August 1994, ten people were hospitalised after the train stopped abruptly on the block section outside of the station.
- In 1997, the train jumped on the brakes, causing it to crash into itself. One boy was taken to hospital with bruised ribs. This incident was shown on the BBC television documentary about Pleasure Beach Resort in 1998.

== In popular culture ==
Avalanche appears in the video game RollerCoaster Tycoon Deluxe in the Blackpool Pleasure Beach scenario.
