= Schweizer Bobbahn (Europa-Park) =

Steel rollercoaster in Germany

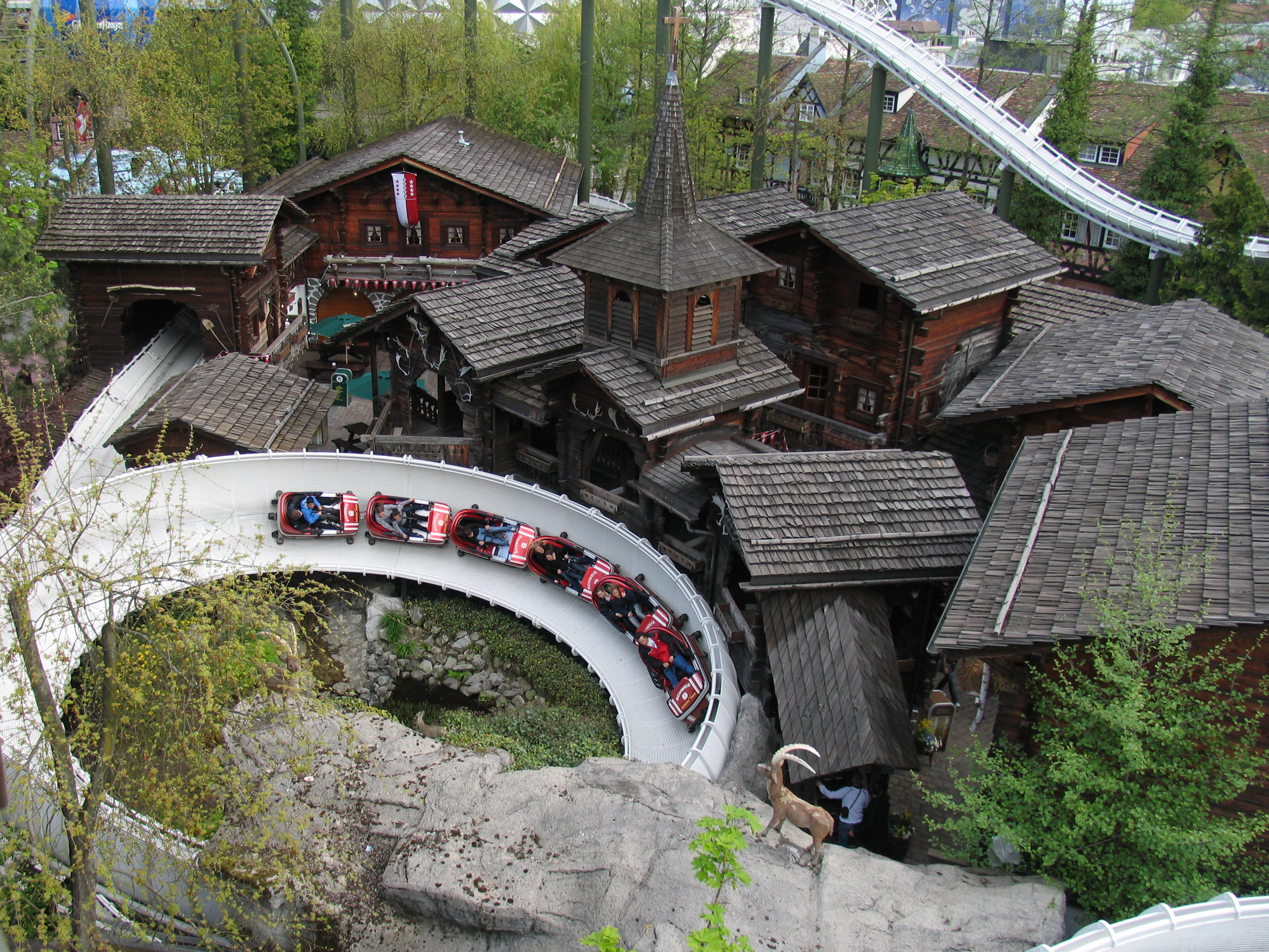
- Swiss village and last helix

Europa-Park
- Location: Europa-Park
- Park section: Switzerland
- Coordinates: 48.266586°N 7.721192°E
- Status: Operating
- Opening date: April 1985

General statistics
- Type: Steel – Bobsled
- Manufacturer: Mack Rides
- Designer: Franz Mack
- Height: 19 m (62 ft)
- Length: 487 m (1,598 ft)
- Speed: 50 km/h (31 mph)
- Inversions: 0
- Duration: 2:30
- Capacity: 1100 riders per hour
- G-force: 3g
- Restraint style: Lap bar
- Height restriction: 120 cm (3 ft 11 in)
- Trains: 5 trains with 6 cars; riders arranged 1 across in 2 rows for a total of 12 riders per train
- Theme: Ice channel / Bobsled
- Schweizer Bobbahn at RCDB

Schweizer Bobbahn (German for 'Swiss bob run' or 'Swiss bobsled') is a steel bobsled roller coaster located in the Swiss-themed section in Europa-Park, Germany. It is currently the oldest as well as the longest continuously operating bobsled coaster in the world.

== History ==
After bobsled coasters have initially been built out of wood, the early 1980s saw the development of steel bobsleds. The first documented steel bobsled on the RCDB was the "Space Coaster" at Saltair, which opened only for a short time in 1982 and 1983. The roller coaster manufacturers Intamin and Mack Rides both developed their version of a steel bobsled, with Schweizer Bobbahn being Mack Rides's prototype.

The coaster was initially advertised as a 'Weltneuheit' ('World novelty') by the park for the 1984 season – the same year that Intamin opened three bobsleds in the US. However, the ride opened to the public in early April 1985, around the same time as Efteling's Swiss Bob. This made Schweizer Bobbahn part of a cluster of six bobsled coasters opened in 1984 and 1985, as well as Europe's first steel bobsled (together with Swiss Bob). It was inaugurated by a German bobsleigh crew.

Theming of the ride was initially much more sparse, with the station and brake house being the only buildings. In 1993 Europa-Park opened the Swiss village as a themed area, which intertwines tightly with Schweizer Bobbahn. The coaster's layout was altered previously, to make space for the village, moving the second helix closer to the first and introducing another block brake as well as another storage track. The same alteration also increased the amount of trains running on the coaster, as well as the maximum theoretical capacity.

== Ride experience ==
Schweizer Bobbahn's trains are not fixated to the track for most of its layout (like all bobsled coasters), but are drifting freely through a half-pipe like channel, constructed out of an array of thin steel tubes. The trains are composed of 6 cars ('bobs') per train, making the experience less like Intamin type bobsleds (which drift and swing heavier to the edges of the track) and more like Flying Turns, effectively controlling the swinging motion somewhat.

=== Layout ===
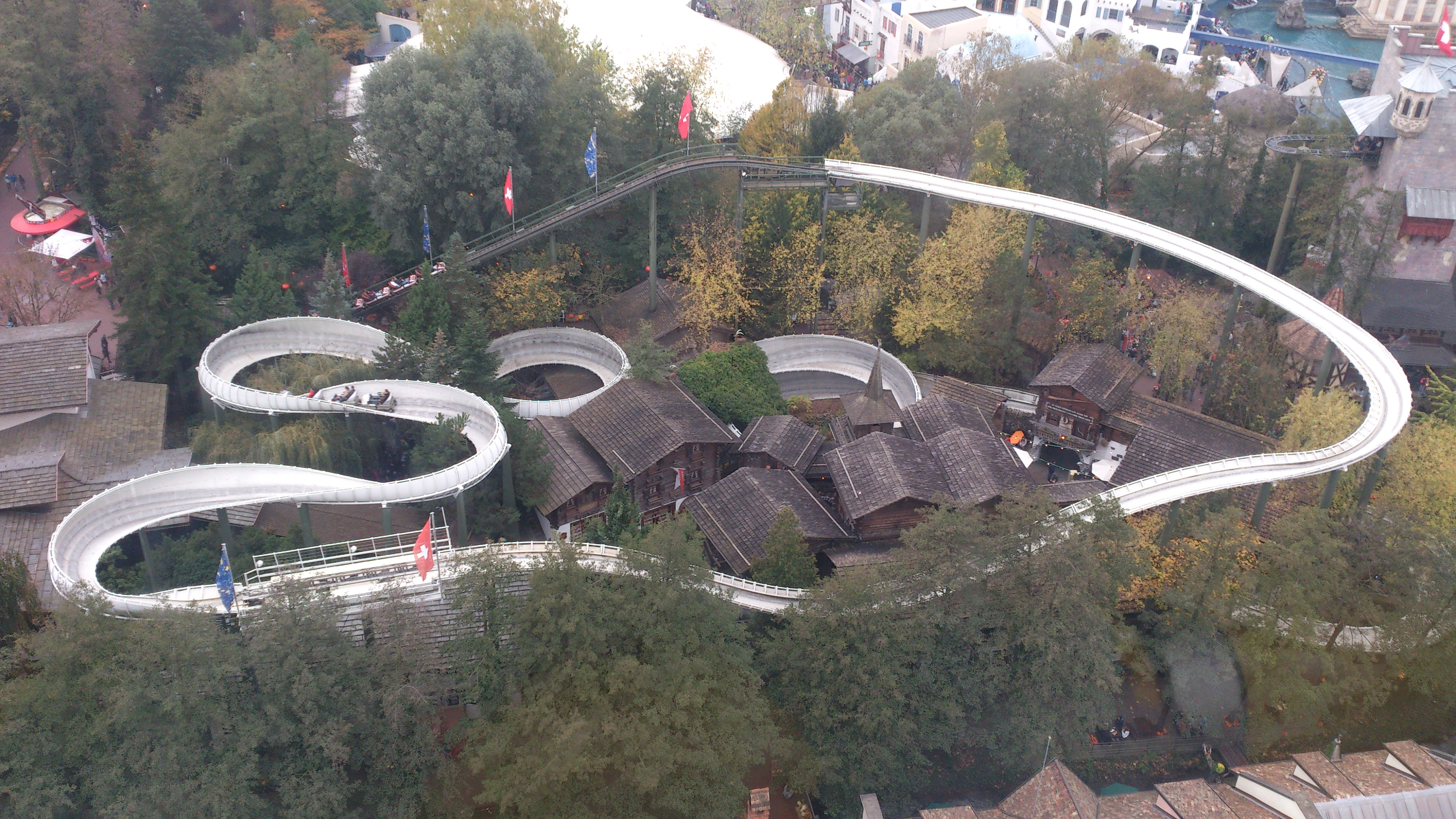
Overview of the complete layout with village

The trains leave the station to the right to engage with the chain lift hill, elevating them to the maximum height of 19m (62ft). From there the trains travel through a slow, wide right-hand turn into the coaster's only drop, ascending again into a brake. Afterwards, the trains navigate three tight turns in alternating directions, gather speed and emerge into two helices. Whereas the first helix is a downward left-hand helix, the second helix used to be an upward right-hand helix and was modified to be downward later. Initially, the second helix lasted longer and brought the trains directly to the break house, whereas it now exits quicker into a small climb and an extended break run. The break run consist of a block brake, a slow right-hand turn, a storage track and a straight with friction wheels to feed into the original break house. The trains exit the break house to the right to get back to the station.

=== Trains ===
There are five trains on the coaster, themed after four countries:

- two red trains labelled 'Schweiz 1' and 'Suisse 2' (German and French names of Switzerland)
- a green train labelled 'Deutschland 1' (Germany)
- a blue train labelled 'France 1'
- a silver train labelled 'Italia 1' (Italy)

The theme reflects three of the languages spoken in Switzerland and loosely fits the touristic location of Europa-Park within Europe.

== Gallery ==
Onride POV

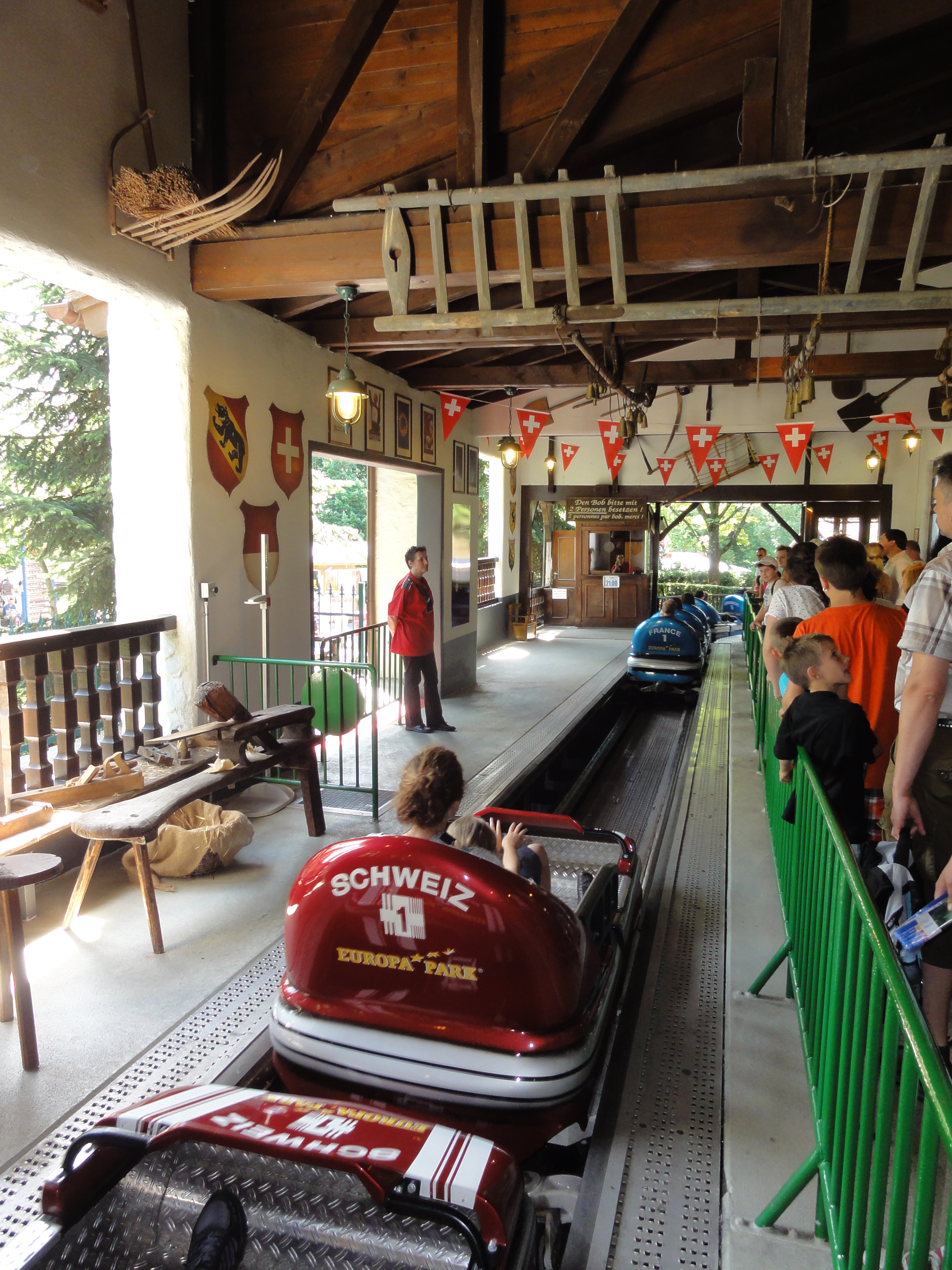
Station interior

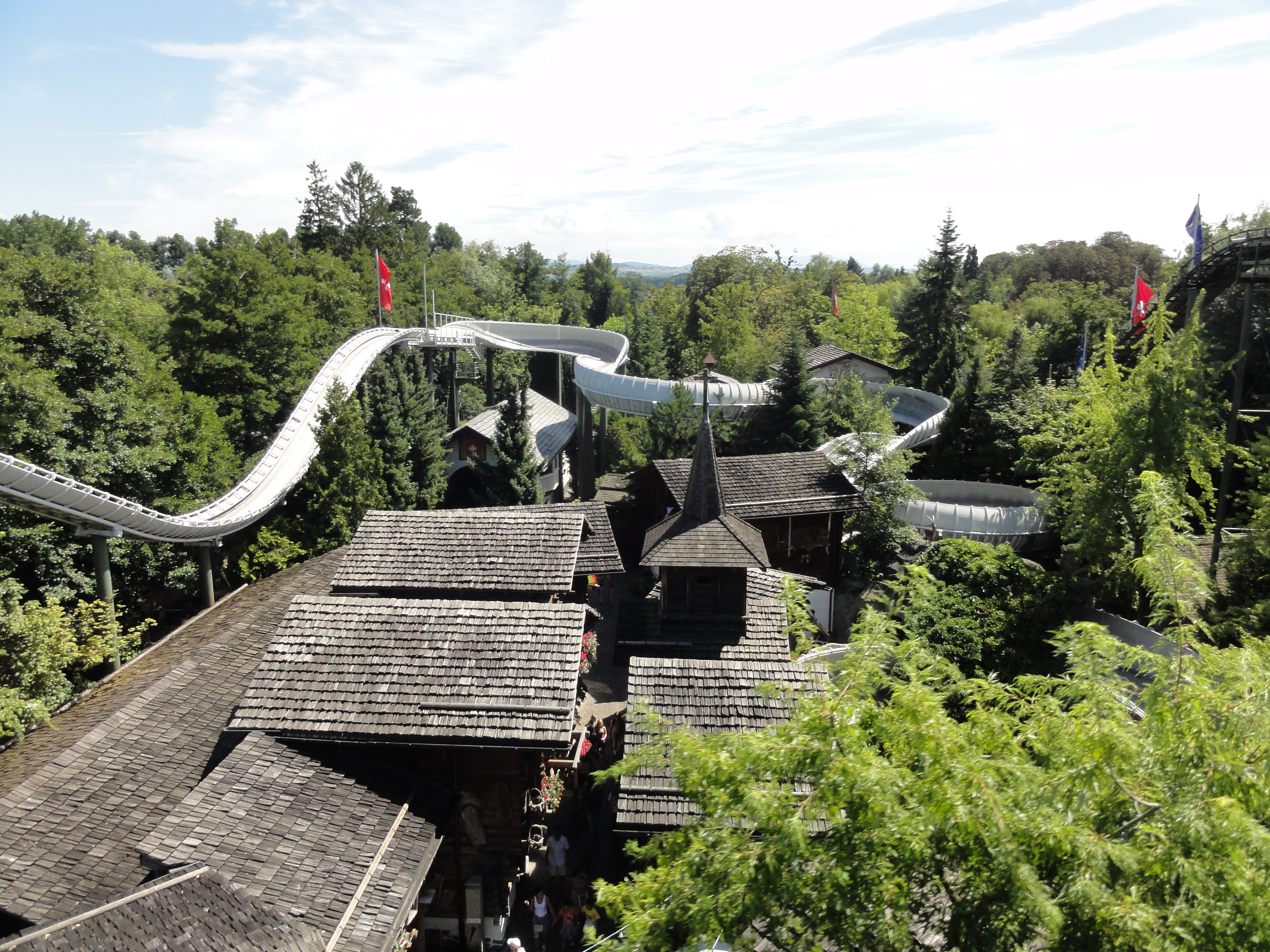
View from the wide right hand curve onto the ride and village

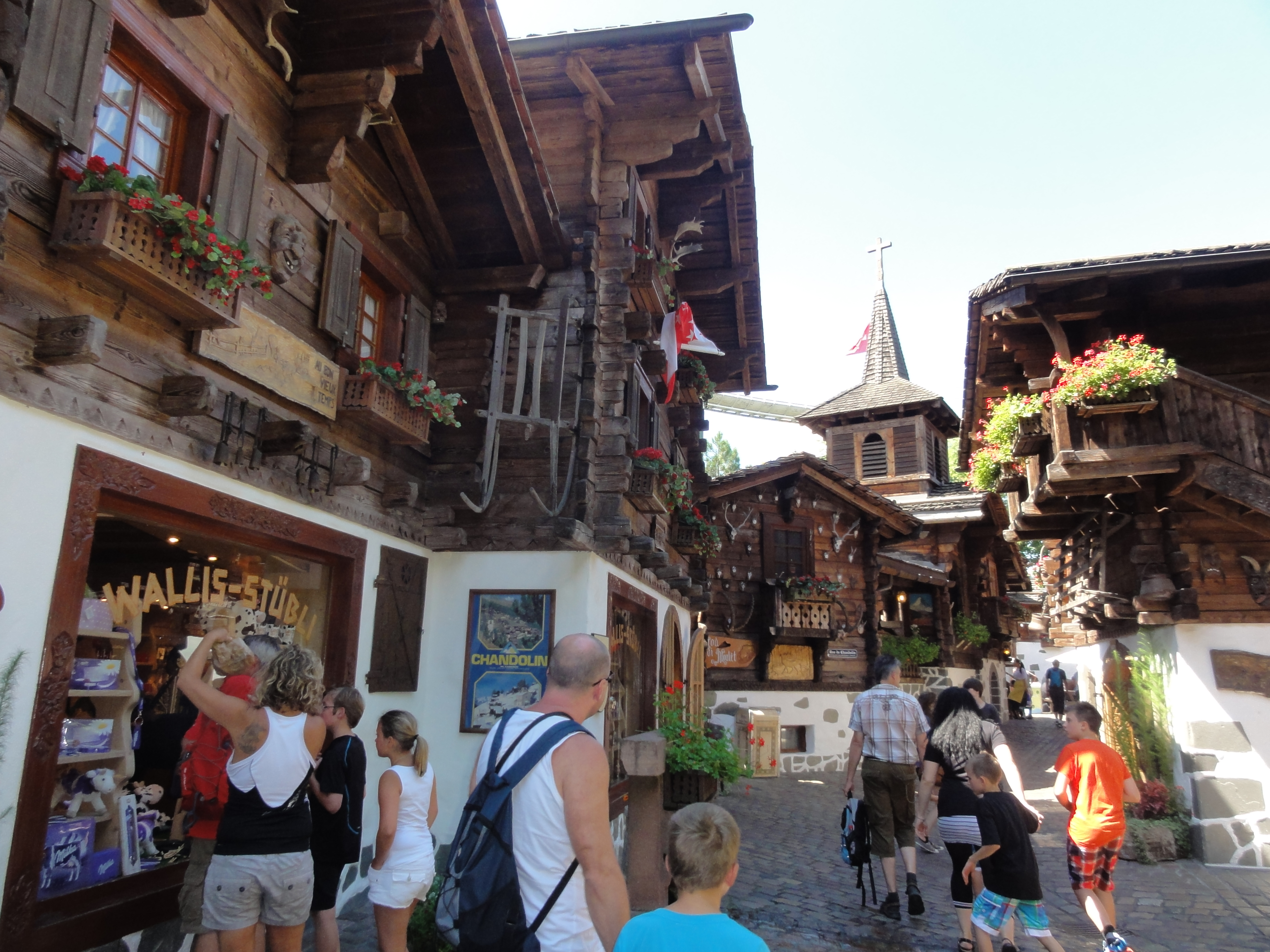
Main street of the Swiss village
