= Bobsled roller coaster =

Roller coaster design

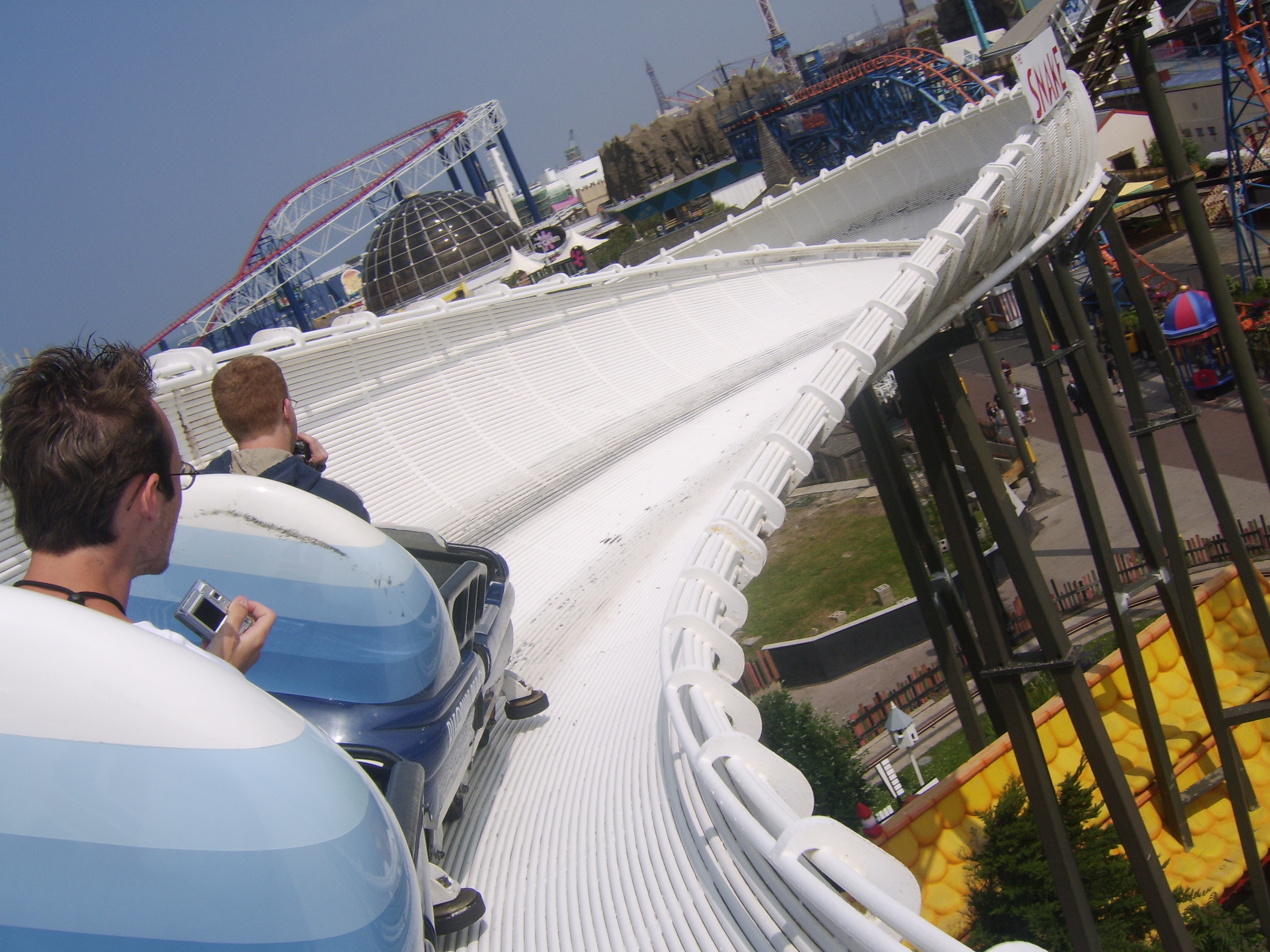
- Avalanche at Blackpool Pleasure Beach
- Status: Discontinued
- First manufactured: 1929
- No. of installations: 26 (6 operating)
- Manufacturers: Mack Rides, Intamin, and John Norman Bartlett
- Restraint Style: Lap-bar
- Bobsled roller coaster at RCDB

A bobsled roller coaster is a roller coaster that uses a track design that is essentially a "pipe" with the top half removed and has cars that are sent down this pipe in a freewheeling mode. The name derives from the great similarity to the track design used for the winter sport of bobsleigh. Most modern bobsled roller coasters are made of steel; however, the first bobsled coasters, known as Flying Turns roller coasters, were made of wood.

== Flying Turns ==
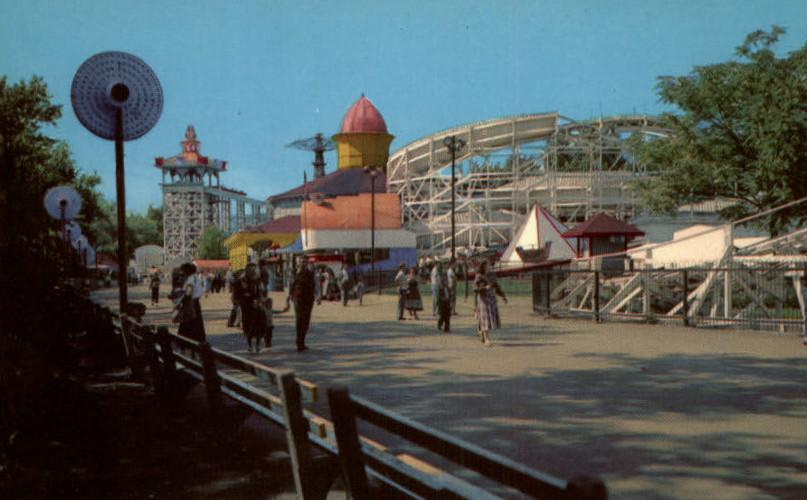
Flying Turns roller coaster at Riverview Park, Chicago, 1968

John Norman Bartlett, a British aviator in World War I, came to North America after the war with an idea for a trackless wooden chute, full of twists like a bobsled course, with toboggan-like cars, based on a bobsled ride that operated in Europe. He had filed GB Patent 279109A for the idea in 1926. Bartlett met John Miller in 1928, and they commenced building the new ride. When the ride went into production, much of the idea was the same, but the cars looks more like monoplanes, which Bartlett designed. Miller worked on the loading station, supporting structure, braking system and incline.

On October 4, 2013, after seven years of construction, Knoebels in Pennsylvania opened the world's only modern wooden Flying Turns coaster, Flying Turns. The ride was scheduled to open in 2007, but had been delayed due to dysfunctional wheels and other issues. As there were no historic plans available, the new coaster was designed entirely from scratch.

== Installations ==
Notably, the Gerstlauer Bobsled Coaster model is not a bobsled coaster by this definition but rather an improvement on the wild mouse.

As of 2012, 21 bobsled roller coasters have been built. The roller coasters are listed in order of opening dates.

| Name | Park | Country | Opened | Closed | Type | Manufacturer | Status |
|---|---|---|---|---|---|---|---|
| Flying Turns | Lakeside Park | United States | 1929 | 1930 - 1954* | Wood | John Norman Bartlett | Removed |
| Flying Turns | Euclid Beach Park | United States | 1930 | September 28, 1969 | Wood | John Norman Bartlett | Removed |
| Flying Turns | Rocky Point Park | United States | 1931 | 1938 | Wood | John Norman Bartlett/Philadelphia Toboggan Coasters | Removed |
| Flying Turns | Forest Park | United States | 1934 | July 19, 1963 | Wood | John Norman Bartlett | Removed |
| Flying Turns | Steeplechase Park | United States | 1934 | September 14, 1939 | Wood | John Norman Bartlett | Removed |
| Flying Turns | Riverview Park; Formerly Century of Progress | United States | 1935; May 27, 1933 | 1967; October 31, 1934 | Wood | John Norman Bartlett | Removed |
| Lake Placid Bobsled | Palisades Amusement Park | United States | 1937 | 1946 | Wood | John Norman Bartlett | Removed |
| Bobsled | Coney Island; Formerly Flushing Meadows Park | United States | 1941; April 30, 1939 | 1974; October 27, 1940 | Wood | John Norman Bartlett | Removed |
| Flying Turns | HersheyPark | United States | 1942 (intended) | N/A | Wood | Philadelphia Toboggan Co. | Cancelled |
| Screamin' Delta Demon | Opryland USA† | United States | April 1984 | October 31, 1997 | Steel | Intamin | Removed |
| Schweizer Bobbahn | Europa Park | Germany | April 1985 | —N/a | Steel | Mack Rides | Operating |
| Bobbaan | Efteling | Netherlands | April 4, 1985 | September 1, 2019 | Steel | Intamin | Removed |
| Disaster Transport; Formerly Avalanche Run | Cedar Point | United States | May 11, 1985 | July 29, 2012 | Steel | Intamin | Removed |
| La Vibora; Formerly Sarajevo Bobsled | Six Flags Over Texas; Six Flags Magic Mountain | United States | 1986; 1984 | 2024; 1986 | Steel | Intamin | Removed |
| Reptilian; Formerly Avalanche | Kings Dominion | United States | 1988 | —N/a | Steel | Mack Rides | Operating |
| Avalanche | Pleasure Beach Blackpool | United Kingdom | June 22, 1988 | —N/a | Steel | Mack Rides | Operating |
| Munich Autobahn | Kobe Portopialand | Japan | April 1991 | March 31, 2006 | Steel | Mack Rides | Removed |
| Schweizer Bobbahn | Heide Park | Germany | 1994 | —N/a | Steel | Mack Rides | Operating |
| Alpine Bobsled; Formerly Rolling Thunder; Formerly Sarajevo Bobsled | Six Flags Great Escape and Hurricane Harbor; Six Flags Great America; Six Flags Great Adventure | United States | 1998; 1989; 1984 | 2023; 1995; 1988 | Steel | Intamin | Removed |
| Trace Du Hourra | Parc Astérix | France | March 31, 2001 | —N/a | Steel | Mack Rides | Operating |
| Flying Turns | Knoebels | United States | October 5, 2013 | —N/a | Wood | Knoebels | Operating |
| Montanha Russa | Parque Shanghai | Brazil | —N/a | —N/a | Wood | —N/a | Removed |

- * Denotes that exact closing date is not known.
- † The Screamin' Delta Demon was transported to Old Indiana Fun Park following Opryland's closure in 1998, but was never reassembled and eventually scrapped.

== In popular culture ==
Both the bobsled coaster and the Flying Turns coaster are buildable in the RollerCoaster Tycoon and Thrillville series of video games.
