= Flying Turns (Knoebels) =

Roller coaster at Knoebels Amusement Resort

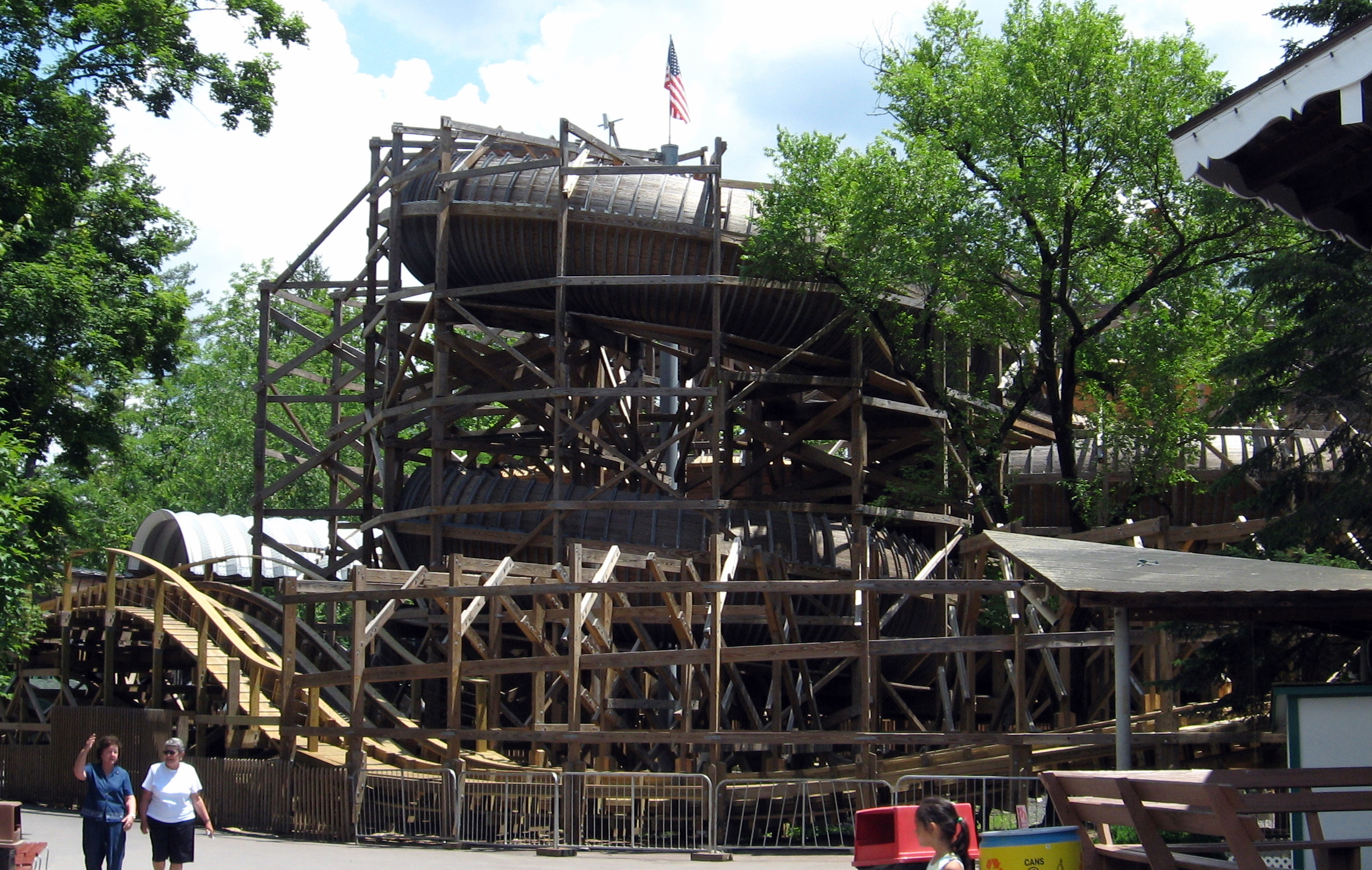
- Flying Turns in 2009

Knoebels Amusement Resort
- Location: Knoebels Amusement Resort
- Coordinates: 40.878387°N 76.505095°W
- Status: Operating
- Soft opening date: October 4, 2013
- Opening date: October 5, 2013

General statistics
- Type: Wood – Bobsled
- Manufacturer: Knoebels Amusement Resort
- Designer: John Fetterman
- Lift/launch system: Four chain lift hills
- Height: 50 ft (15 m)
- Length: 1,300 ft (400 m)
- Speed: 24 mph (39 km/h)
- Inversions: 0
- Height restriction: 42 in (107 cm)
- Trains: 4 Larson International trains with 3 cars; riders arranged 1 across in 2 rows for a total of 6 riders per train
- Flying Turns at RCDB

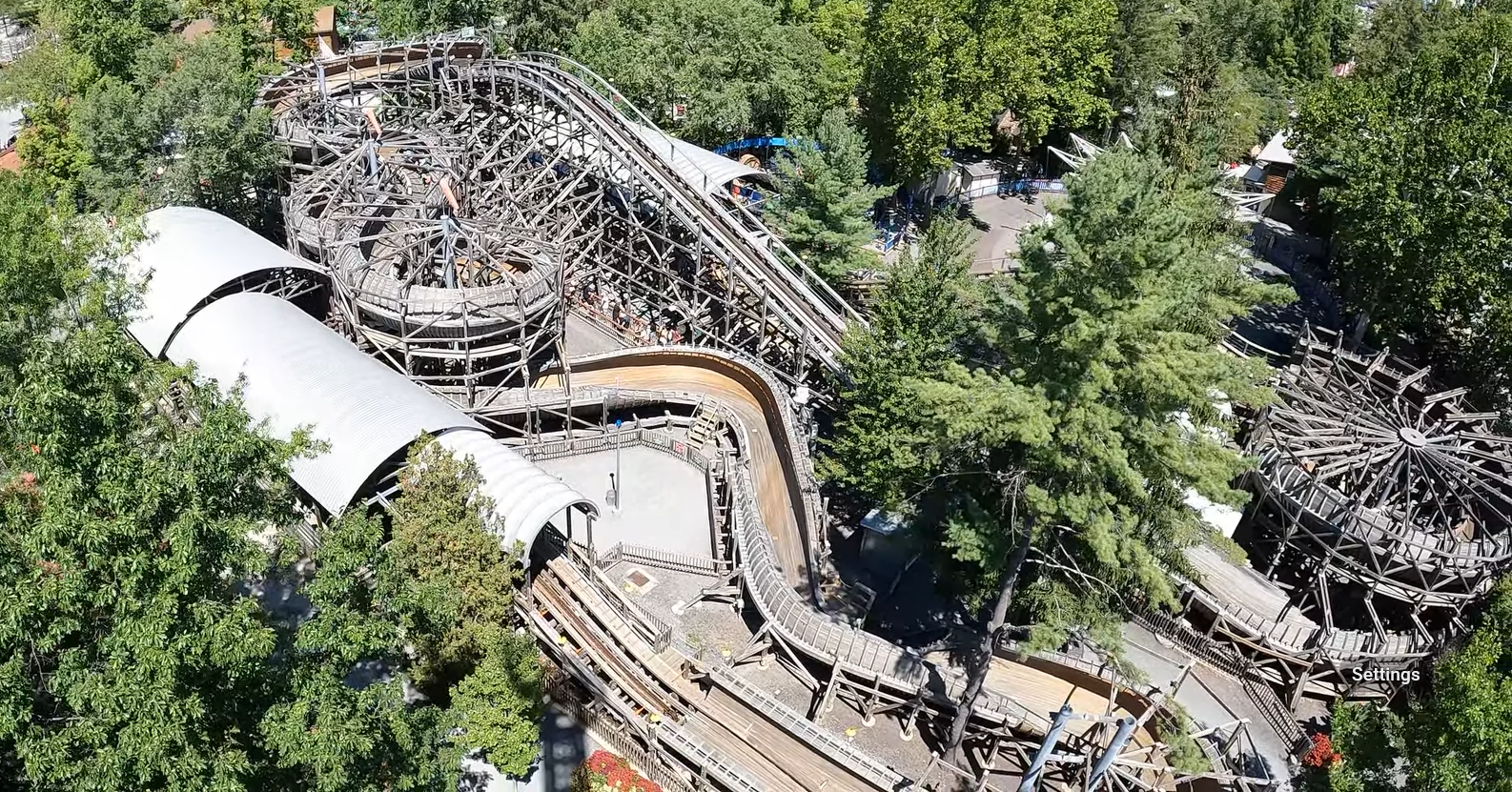
Flying Turns viewed from above

Flying Turns is a wooden bobsled roller coaster at Knoebels Amusement Resort in Elysburg, Pennsylvania. It is modeled after a similar ride designed by John Norman Bartlett and John Miller in the 1920s. The ride concept is similar to a modern steel bobsled roller coaster; however Flying Turns is made of wood, like the original rides. The layout of the ride is most similar to the original located at Riverview Park in Chicago, Illinois.

== History ==
Construction began in January 2006. In July 2007, the first test car test runs were completed successfully. In October 2007, the first powered test runs of the same test cars were completed. Roller coaster enthusiasts were given a tour which showcased the ride during the Phoenix Phall Phunfest 2007. Later that month, the park began to run test runs of a five-car test train which would be the full length of the train.

An initial delay arose due to an issue with the car's wheels. The wheels were shipped back to their manufacturer in California and the issue was corrected. However, the ride did not open by the end of the 2008 season due to the cars travelling too quickly for passenger comfort. According to Knoebels' website, the ride was to be opened during the 2009 season. The ride was re-tracked and profiled to accommodate new trains.

In June 2011, Knoebels posted an update to their website, stating "We've been testing the newest version of the Flying Turns ride vehicles and are VERY encouraged. There's still plenty of work to do but this is a very positive step in the right direction." They also posted to their Facebook page a video shot from a camera mounted on a prototype chassis.

On May 26, 2012, a section of track at the brake platform, as well as the brake platform itself, was removed. On July 30, the removed sections were rebuilt to accommodate the newest trains that were being delivered. In August 2012, Knoebels said that they planned on beginning testing for the newest trains soon, and that they believed they finally figured out how to get the trains to run smoothly.

On October 5, 2013, the ride officially opened to the public, though the ride actually began operating the previous evening on October 4. It operates three trains with three cars apiece, and each car accommodates one large rider or two small riders, with a weight limit of 400 pounds (180 kg) per car. One train is painted green, one is painted yellow, a third is painted mauve, and the fourth train is painted lavender.

== Awards ==
On February 7, 2026, American Coaster Enthusiasts (ACE) announced Flying Turns will receive recognition as an ACE Coaster Landmark during the park's 100th anniversary celebration later in the year. It is the youngest coaster to achieve Coaster Landmark status.

Flying Turns regularly places in the top 50 wooden coasters in Amusement Today's award list. Flying Turns also won Best New Ride of 2014.

Golden Ticket Awards: Top wood Roller Coasters
Year									1998	1999
Ranking									–	–
Year	2000	2001	2002	2003	2004	2005	2006	2007	2008	2009
Ranking	–	–	–	–	–	–	–	–	–	–
Year	2010	2011	2012	2013	2014	2015	2016	2017	2018	2019
Ranking	–	–	–	–	25	21	41	44	34	33
Year	2020	2021	2022	2023	2024	2025	2026			
Ranking	N/A	27	28	23	31	34 (tie)	31			

== See also ==
- 2013 in amusement parks
