= Swiss Bob =

Defunct roller coaster at Efteling

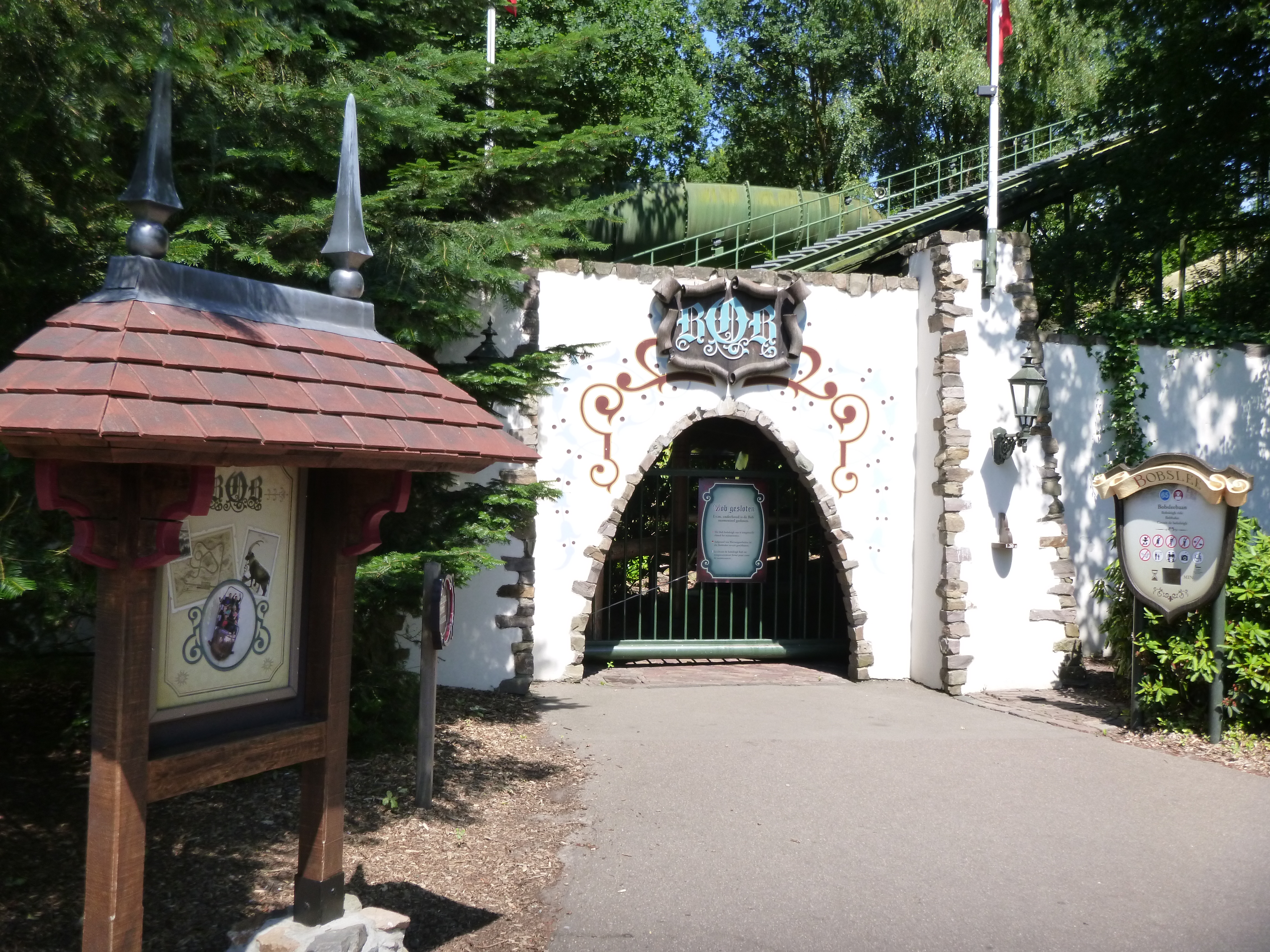
- The entrance to Swiss Bob in 2018

Efteling
- Location: Efteling
- Park section: Anderrijk
- Coordinates: 51°38′53″N 5°02′51″E
- Status: Removed
- Soft opening date: 27 March 1985
- Opening date: 4 April 1985
- Closing date: 1 September 2019
- Replaced by: Max & Moritz

General statistics
- Type: Steel – Bobsled
- Manufacturer: Intamin
- Designer: Giovanola
- Model: Swiss Bob
- Track layout: Bobsled
- Lift/launch system: Chain lift
- Height: 65.62 ft (20.00 m)
- Length: 1,778.22 ft (542.00 m)
- Speed: 37.28 mph (60.00 km/h)
- Inversions: 0
- Duration: 2.10 minutes
- Max vertical angle: 80°
- Capacity: 750 riders per hour
- Height restriction: 47.3 in (120 cm)
- Single rider line available
- Swiss Bob at RCDB

Swiss Bob (or "Bobbaan" in Dutch) was a Bobsled roller coaster in the Efteling amusement park in the Netherlands.

== History ==
=== Construction and opening ===
Construction of the Bob began in 1984. The track consisted of green gutters with a snow-colored interior and was built between the trees. A soft opening was held on 27 March 1985, during a press conference with a team of European bobsleigh riders. On 4 April 1985 the Bob opened to the general public.

=== Operation ===
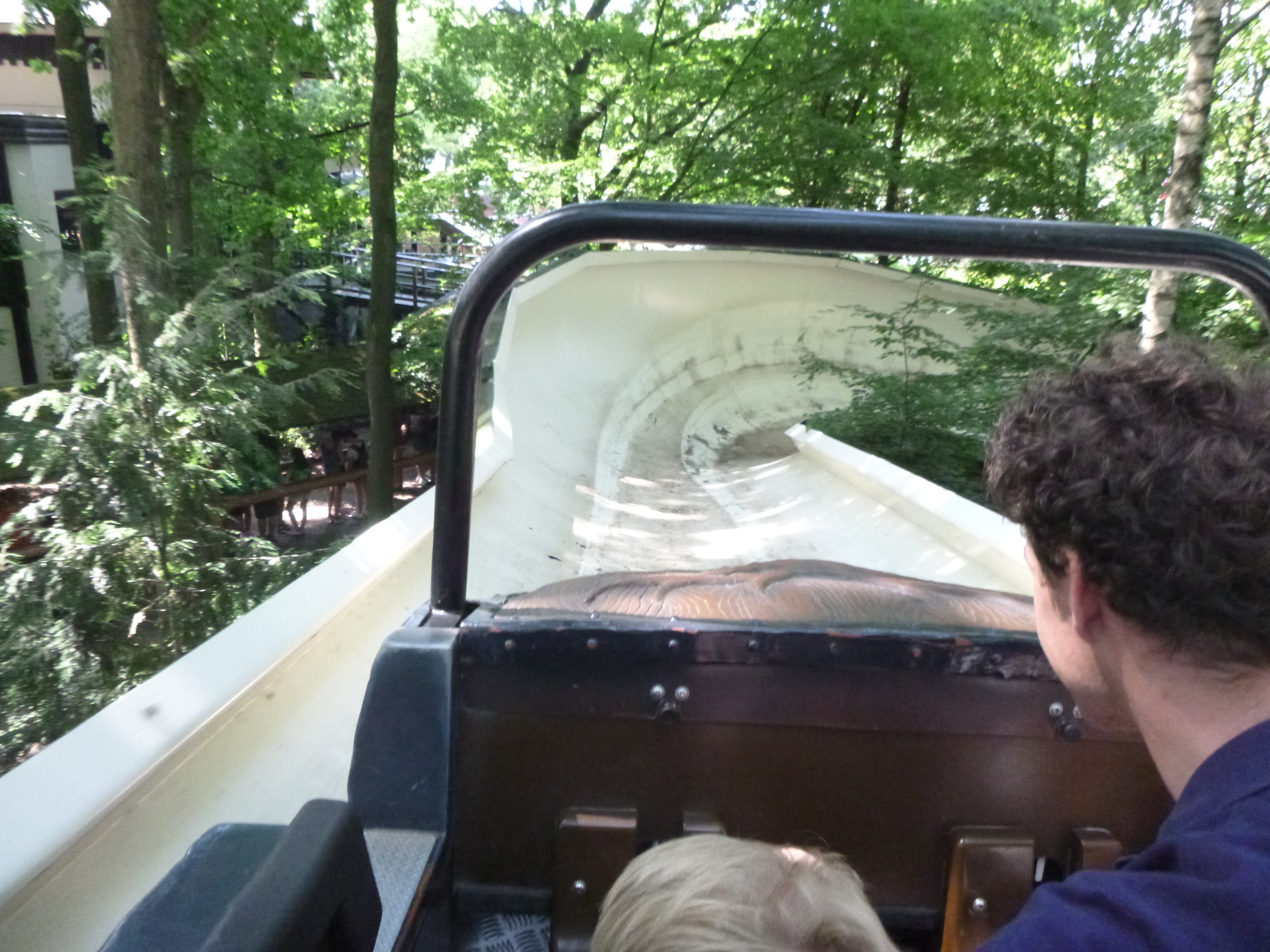
The Swiss Bob

For the 1996 season, the hard nylon wheels were replaced with rubber ones to reduce noise and run a little faster on the track. Two years later in 1998, the queue line's capacity was expanded and the entire meandering covered and equipped with televisions. Then in 2000, a brand new computer control system would be installed.

The Bob received new trains during the 2005 season. Each row would have two riders rather than a single. Meanwhile, the original trains were shipped to Six Flags Over Texas in Arlington, Texas, where they were being used on La Vibora.

In 2012, the queue house was refurbished with a new color scheme and signs. A single rider entrance was added to the Bob in 2013.

During the 2017 and 2018 season, the Bob had several issues and was closed for several months in order to fix these. These included issues with trains rolling back on the lift hill and issues with the brakes. Since 2017, the Bob closed down during rain, as the brakes were unable to stop the trains when the track was wet.

=== Closure and demolition ===
On 9 October 2018 Efteling announced that the Bob would be closing permanently during the 2019 season. Officials planned an expansion near Vogel Rok, but this was postponed and the Bob's replacement would occur instead. A farewell song called Dag Mooie Bob was released. The Bob would give its final rides on 1 September 2019, along with a closing ceremony. The following day, demolition of the attraction had already started. A new Mack Rides dueling powered coaster named Max & Moritz was built in its place the following year. The ride reuses the Bob's former station.

== Characteristics ==
"Bobbaan" had 8 trains, each with a capacity of 6 passengers. The original Bobsleds, with inline seating, were replaced with new trains that sit 2 across in order to increase the ride capacity and fight back the extreme queue times (of up to 90 minutes). The original Bobsled cars were replaced by sleds with a wooden theming that matches the station's classical Austrian Alps style.

The original trains were sold to Six Flags Over Texas for their La Vibora bobsled roller coaster.

It was a smooth ride, especially since the original steel wheels were replaced by softer ones in order to comply with the night- opening license. The ride meandered through the trees, and had some drops, curves and points where the ride really picked up some speed.

The music in the station was traditional Austrian music.
