= Max & Moritz (roller coaster) =

Dueling powered roller coasters

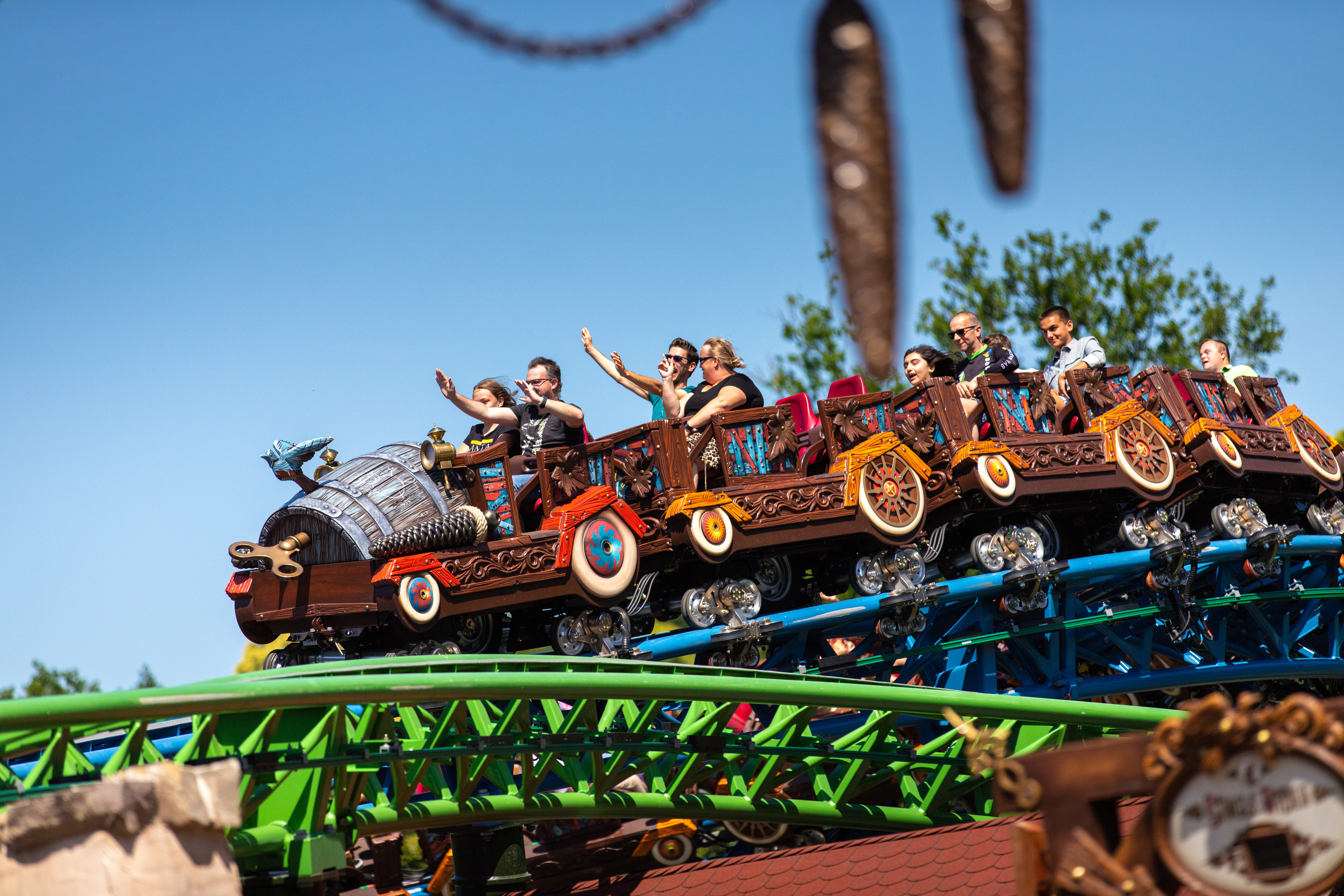
- One of the trains

Efteling
- Location: Efteling
- Park section: Anderrijk
- Coordinates: 51.648090°N 5.047384°E
- Status: Operating
- Soft opening date: June 4, 2020
- Opening date: June 20, 2020
- Cost: €15,000,000
- Replaced: Bob Track

General statistics
- Type: Steel – Powered – Dual-tracked
- Manufacturer: Mack Rides
- Designer: Robert-Jaap Jansen; Karel Willemen
- Model: Powered coaster
- Lift/launch system: Onboard motors
- Height: 6 m (20 ft)
- Length: 300 m (980 ft)
- Speed: 36 km/h (22 mph)
- Inversions: 0
- Duration: 2:30
- Capacity: 1800 riders per hour
- Height restriction: 100 cm (3 ft 3 in)
- Trains: 2 trains with 1 locomotive and 9 cars. Riders are arranged 2 across in 2 rows (1 for the locomotive) for a total of 38 riders per train.
- Theme: Max und Moritz
- Website: Official website
- Single rider line available
- Max & Moritz at RCDB

Video

Max & Moritz are a pair of duelling powered roller coasters manufactured by Mack Rides opened in 2020 at theme park Efteling in the Netherlands. The coasters replace the bobsled roller coaster at the same location, with both attractions utilising the station building of their predecessor. The ride is based on the 1865 German illustrated story Max and Moritz by Wilhelm Busch.

== History ==
=== Announcement ===
In October 2018, the park simultaneously announced the intention to close the Bob Track and the replacement by Max & Moritz. The by then 34 year old roller coaster was enduring frequent breakdowns, and Intamin was no longer producing this type of attraction. The park delayed an expansion near Vogel Rok and moved up the Bob's replacement. The ride would officially close for good in September 2019. Max & Moritz was announced to be intended as a family coaster, with a required height of 100 centimeters. Costs were estimated to be €15,000,000.

=== Construction ===
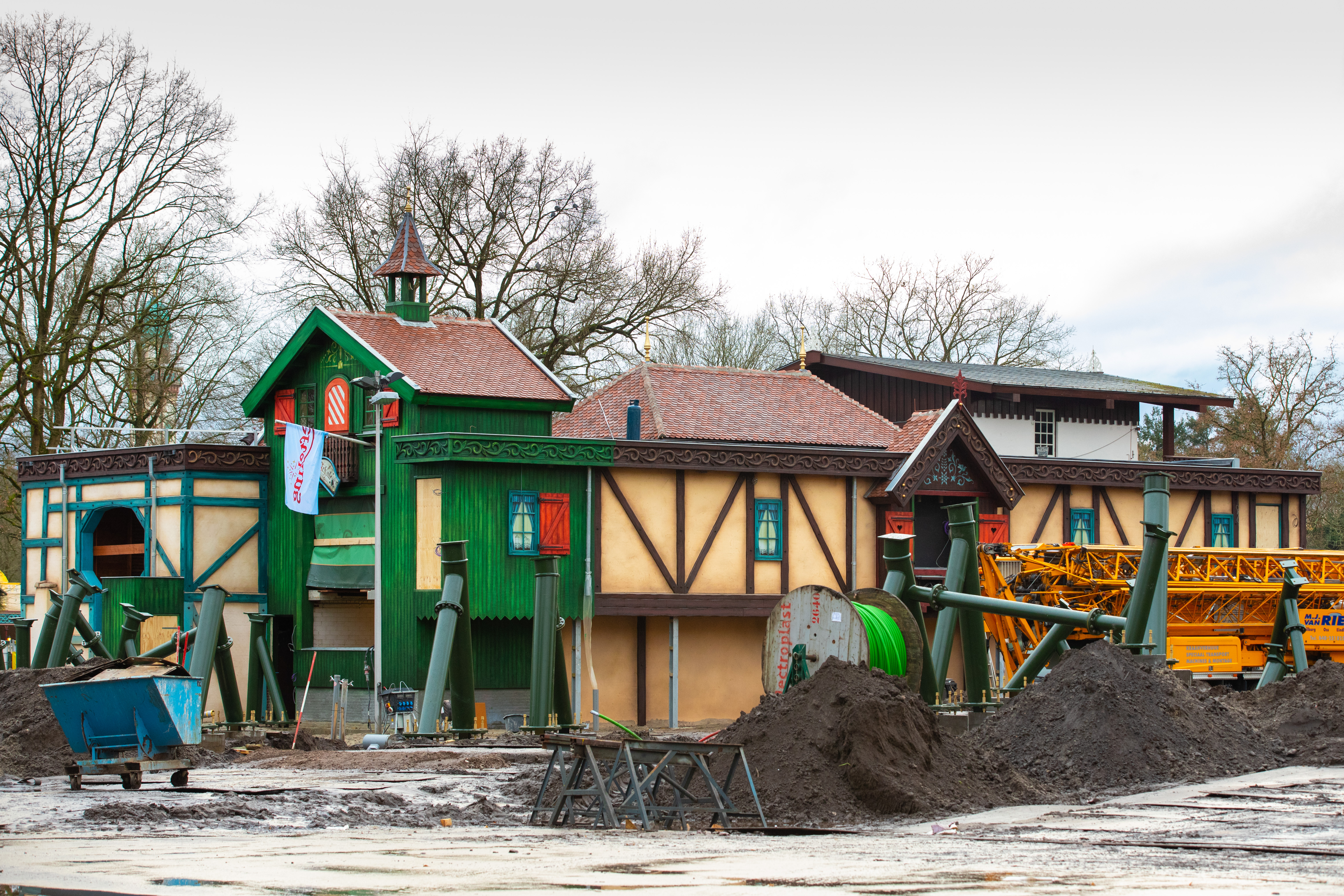
Back of the station building during construction. Part of the structure of the station of the former Bob Track has been reused.

Preparations for construction began in June 2019. Trees in the intended construction area were cut down and several access roads were widened. The Bob Track closed on 1 September 2019, and demolition of the former Intamin bobsled coaster commenced the following day to allow for construction of the new attractions to begin.

By December 2019, all supports were in place and the highest construction point was reached. The first track parts arrived in January 2020, and the whole track was completed after one week and a half. The first train coaches arrived in March 2020, and the first test run of the blue Max track was completed on 13 March.

== Ride experience ==
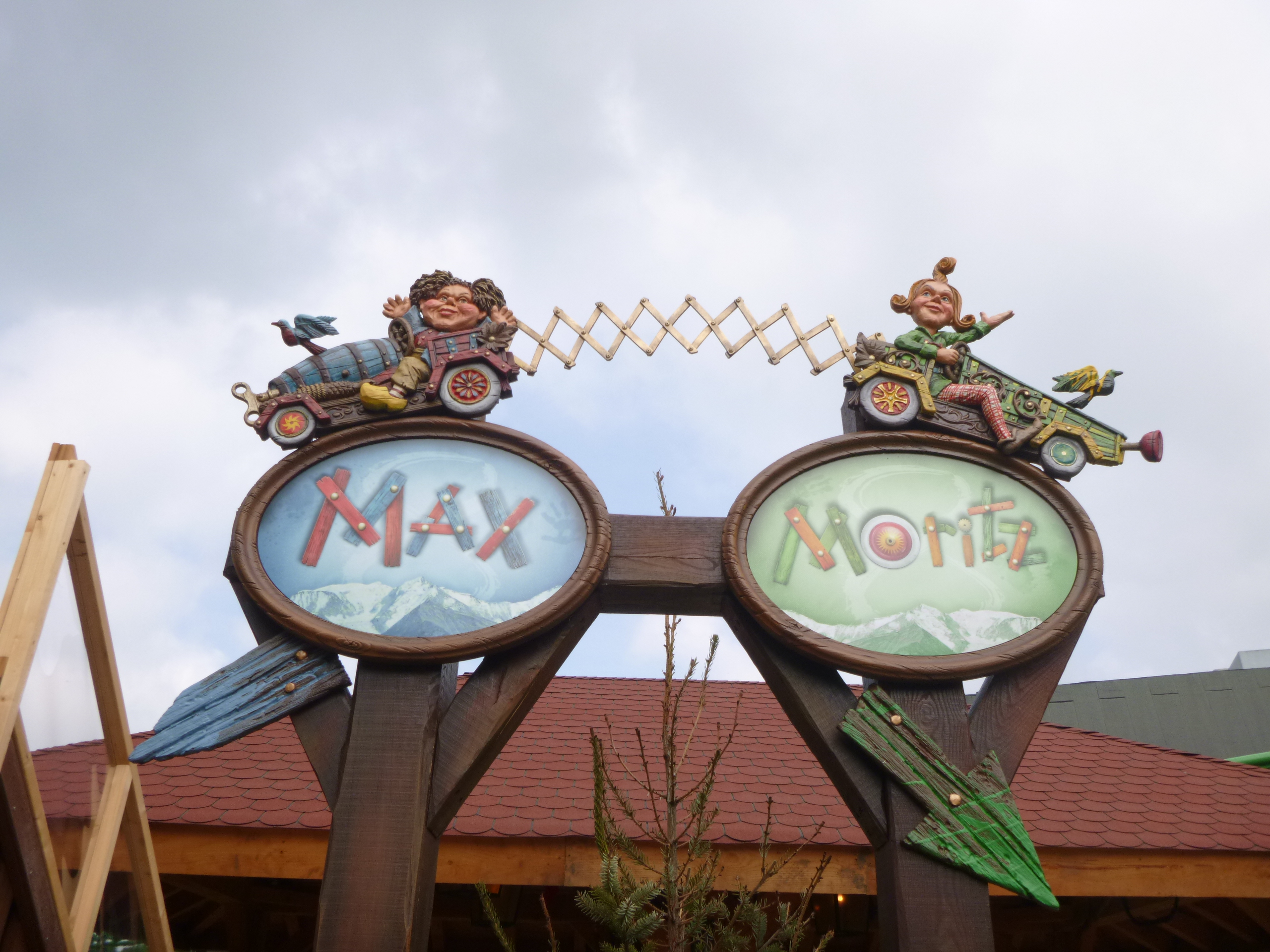
Two entrances.

The coaster consists of two tracks, the blue Max and green Moritz tracks. Both tracks run in opposite direction. The maximum speed is 36 km/h. Each track has one train, which consists of a locomotive and nine more coaches, for a total of 38 passengers per train. The coaster have a capacity of 1800 riders per hour.
