= Max and Moritz =

German language illustrated story in verse

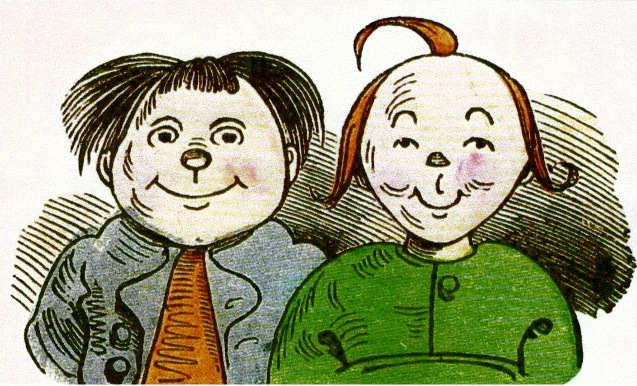
Max and Moritz.

Max and Moritz: A Story of Seven Boyish Pranks (original: Max und Moritz – Eine Bubengeschichte in sieben Streichen) is a German language illustrated story in verse. It was written and illustrated by Wilhelm Busch and published in 1865, and has since had significant cultural impact, both in German-speaking countries, where the story has been passed down through generations, and in the wider world, after translation into many languages. It has been adapted for film and television, as well as inspiring comic strips and children's TV characters.

== Description ==
Max and Moritz: A Story of Seven Boyish Pranks is an inventive, blackly humorous tale, told entirely in rhymed couplets, about two boys who play pranks. It was written and illustrated by Wilhelm Busch and published in 1865. It is among the early works of Busch, yet it already featured many of the aesthetic properties and patterns to be found in Busch's later works.

Many familiar with comic strip history consider it to have been the direct inspiration for the Katzenjammer Kids and Quick & Flupke. The German title satirises the German custom of giving a subtitle to the name of dramas in the form of "Ein Drama in ... Akten" (A Drama in ... Acts), which became dictum in colloquial usage for any event with an unpleasant or dramatic quality, such as "Bundespräsidentenwahl - Ein Drama in drei Akten" ("Federal Presidential Elections - A drama in three acts").

=== The pranks ===
There have been several English translations of the original German verses over the years, but all have maintained the original trochaic tetrameter:

==== Preface ====
Ah, how oft we read or hear of
Boys we almost stand in fear of!
For example, take these stories
Of two youths, named Max and Moritz,
Who, instead of early turning
Their young minds to useful learning,
Often leered with horrid features
At their lessons and their teachers.

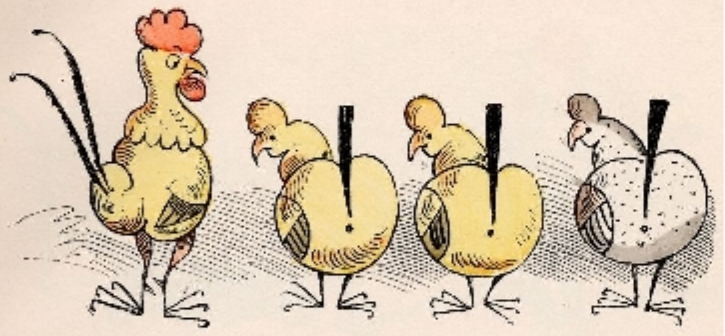
The widow's four chickens (first trick)

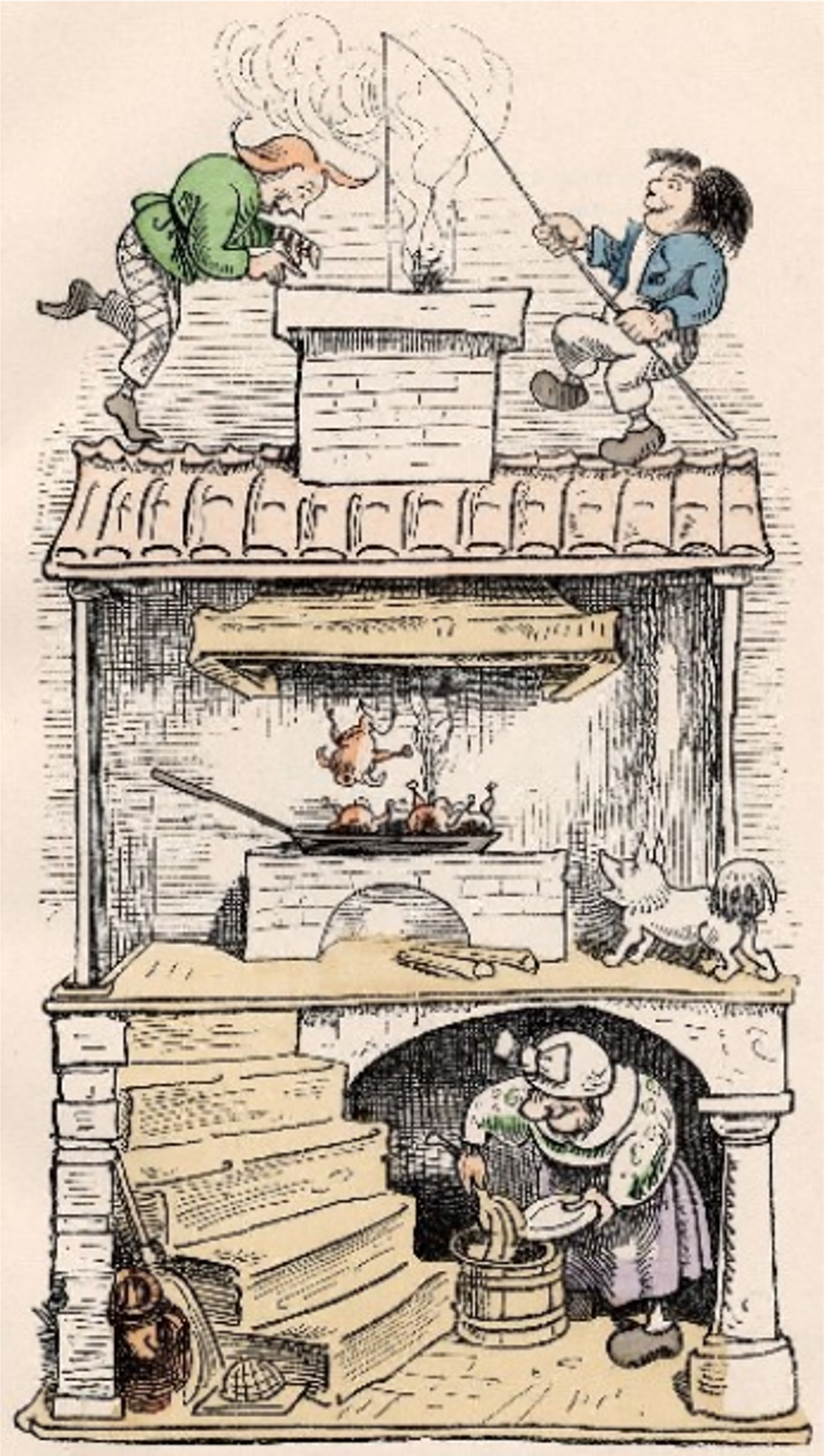
The widow's house (second trick)

Look now at the empty head: he
Is for mischief always ready.
Teasing creatures - climbing fences,
Stealing apples, pears, and quinces,
Is, of course, a deal more pleasant,
And far easier for the present,
Than to sit in schools or churches,
Fixed like roosters on their perches

But O dear, O dear, O deary,
When the end comes sad and dreary!
'Tis a dreadful thing to tell
That on Max and Moritz fell!
All they did this book rehearses,
Both in pictures and in verses.

==== First Trick: The Widow ====
The boys tie several crusts of bread together with thread, and lay this trap in the chicken yard of Bolte (or "Tibbets" in the English version), an old widow, causing all the chickens to become fatally entangled.

This prank is remarkably similar to the eighth history of the classic German prankster tales of Till Eulenspiegel.

==== Second Trick: The Widow II ====
As the widow cooks her chickens, the boys sneak onto her roof. When she leaves her kitchen momentarily, the boys steal the chickens using a fishing pole down the chimney. The widow hears her dog barking and hurries upstairs, finds the hearth empty and beats the dog.

==== Third Trick: The Tailor ====
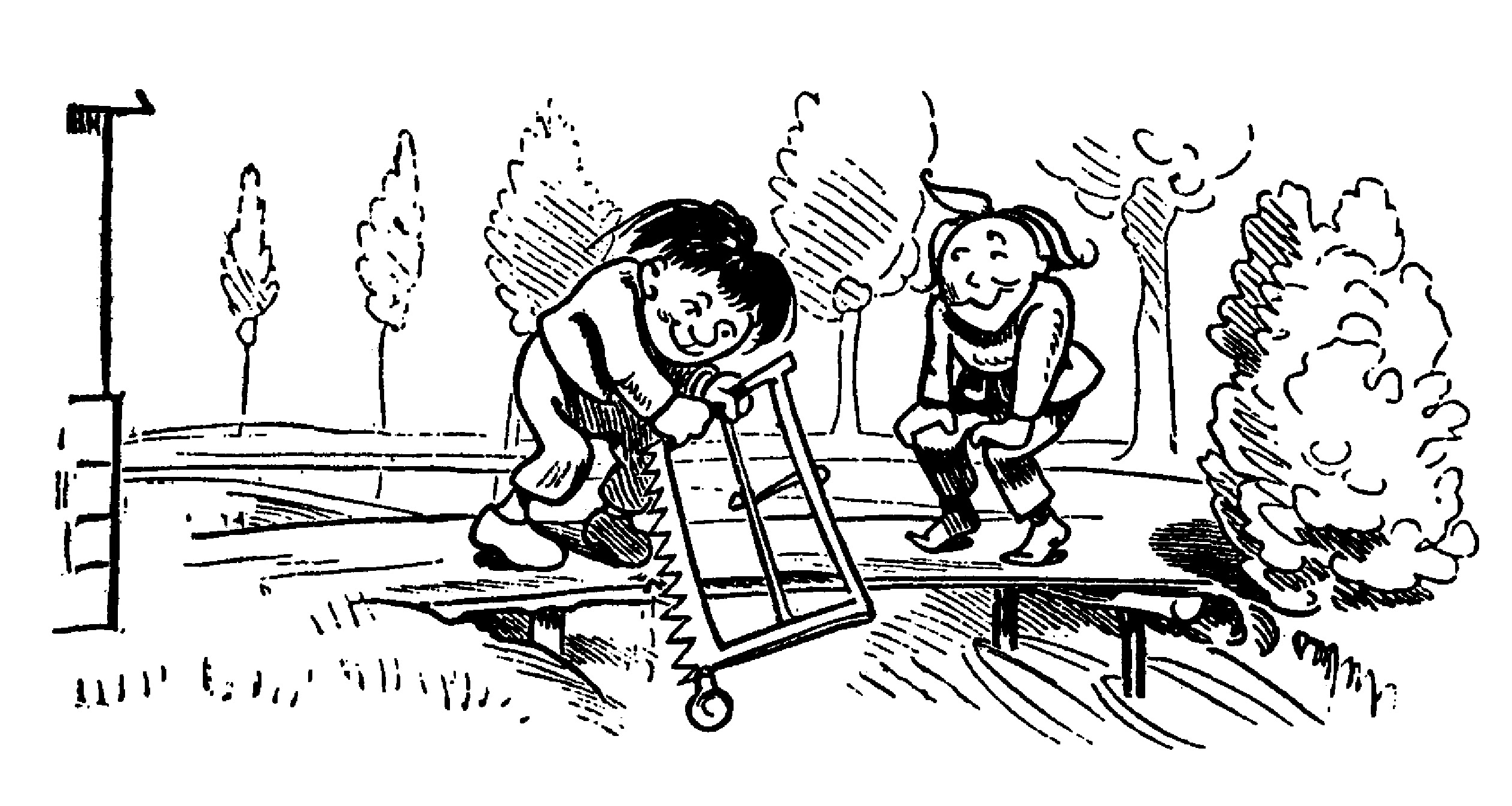
Sawing through the bridge planks (third trick)

The boys torment Böck (or "Buck" in the English version), a well-liked tailor who has a fast stream flowing in front of his house. They saw through the planks of his wooden bridgelet, making a precarious gap, then taunt him by making goat noises (a pun on his name being similar to the zoological expression 'buck'; in the English version, they use his name for a straight pun), until he runs outside. The bridge breaks; the tailor is swept away and nearly drowns (but for two geese, which he grabs a hold of and which fly high to safety).

Although Till removes the planks of the bridge instead of sawing them, there are some similarities to Till Eulenspiegel (32nd History).

==== Fourth Trick: The Teacher ====
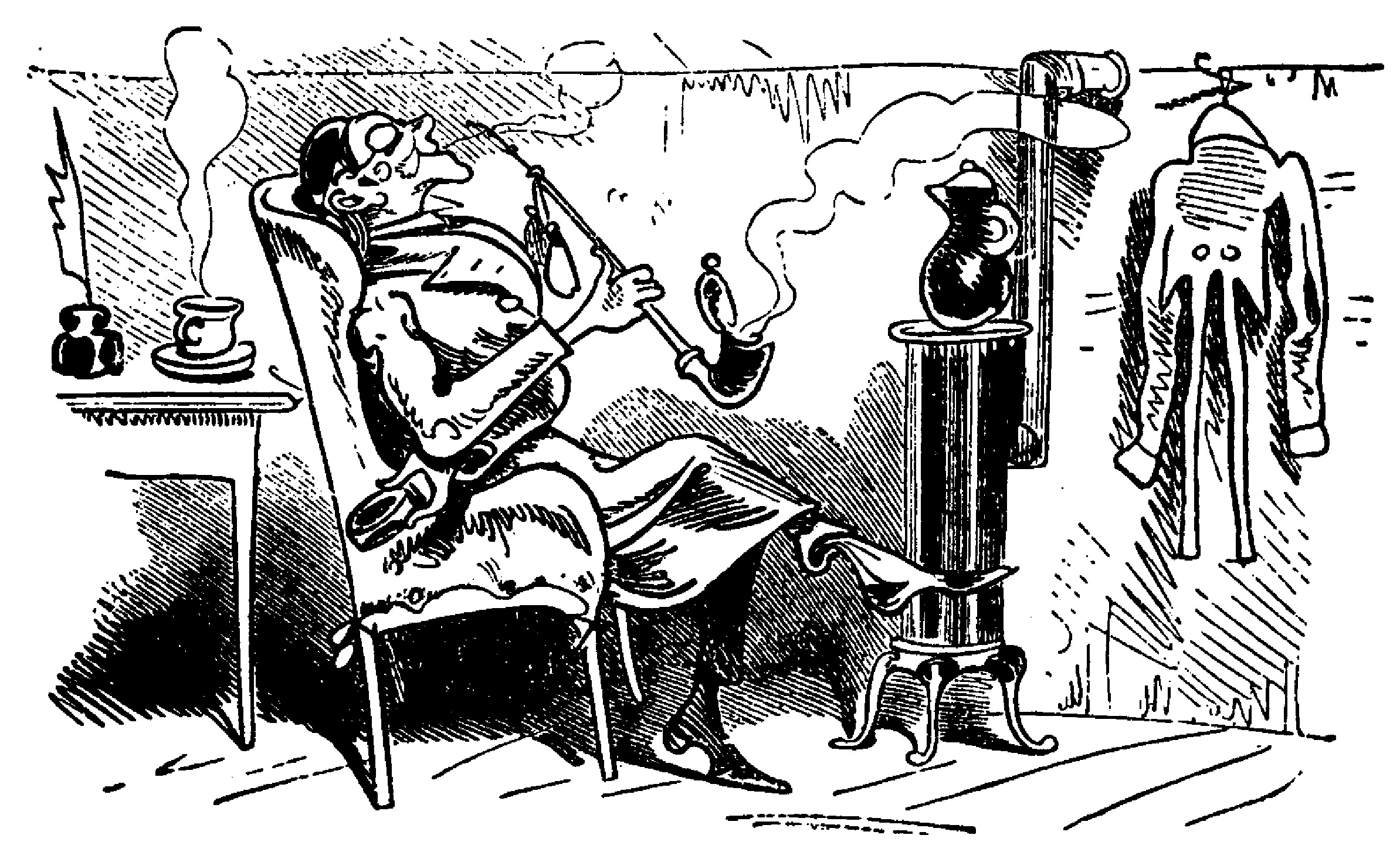
The teacher with his pipe (fourth trick)

While their devout teacher, Lämpel, is busy at church, the boys invade his home and fill his favorite pipe with gunpowder. When he lights the pipe, the blast knocks him unconscious, blackens his skin and burns away all his hair. But: "Time that comes will quick repair; yet the pipe retains its share."

==== Fifth Trick: The Uncle ====
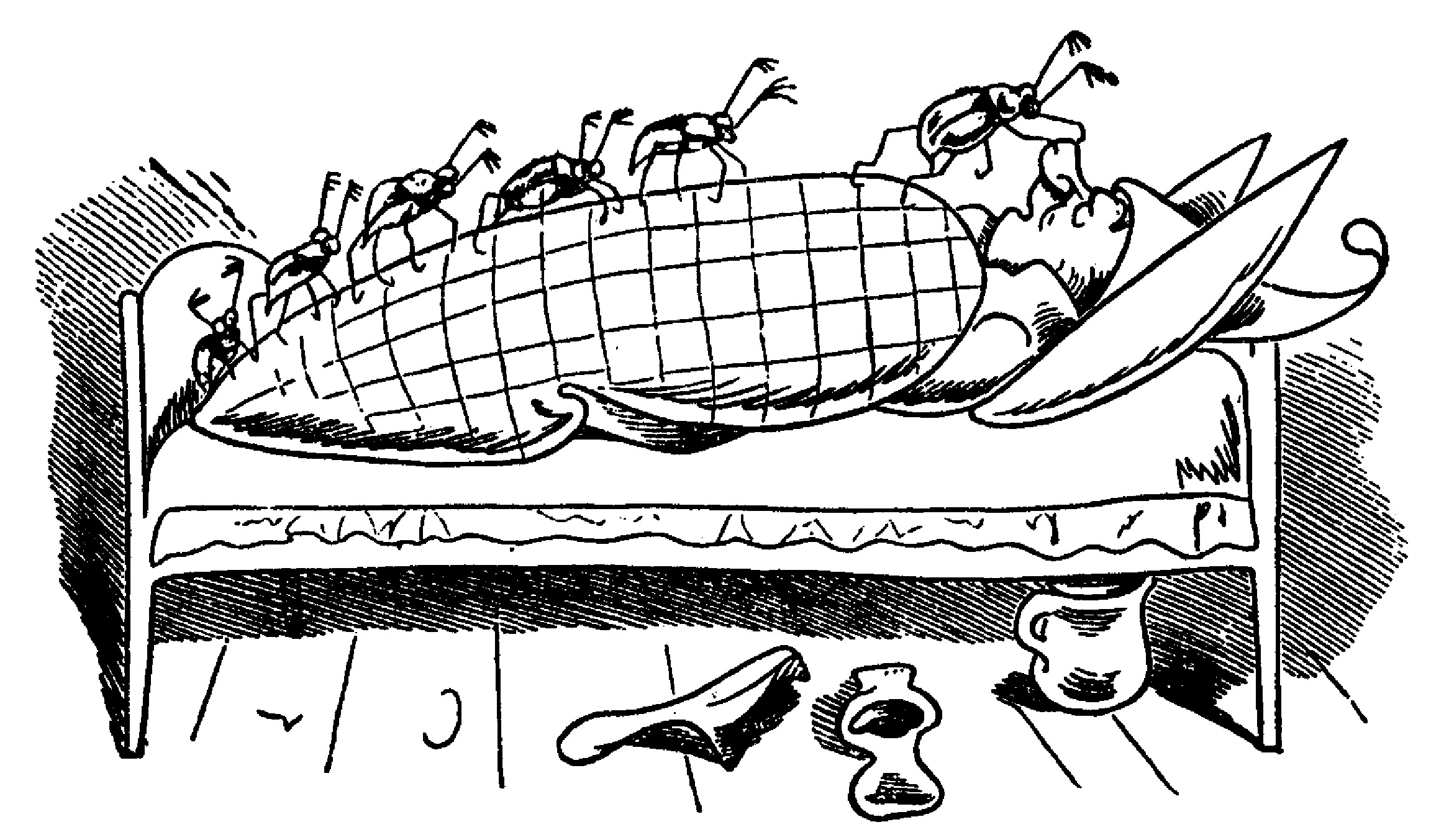
The uncle and the May bugs (fifth trick)

The boys collect bags full of May bugs, which they promptly deposit in their Uncle Fritz's bed. Uncle is nearly asleep when he feels the bugs walking on his nose. Horrified, he goes into a frenzy, killing them all before going back to sleep.

==== Sixth Trick: The Baker ====
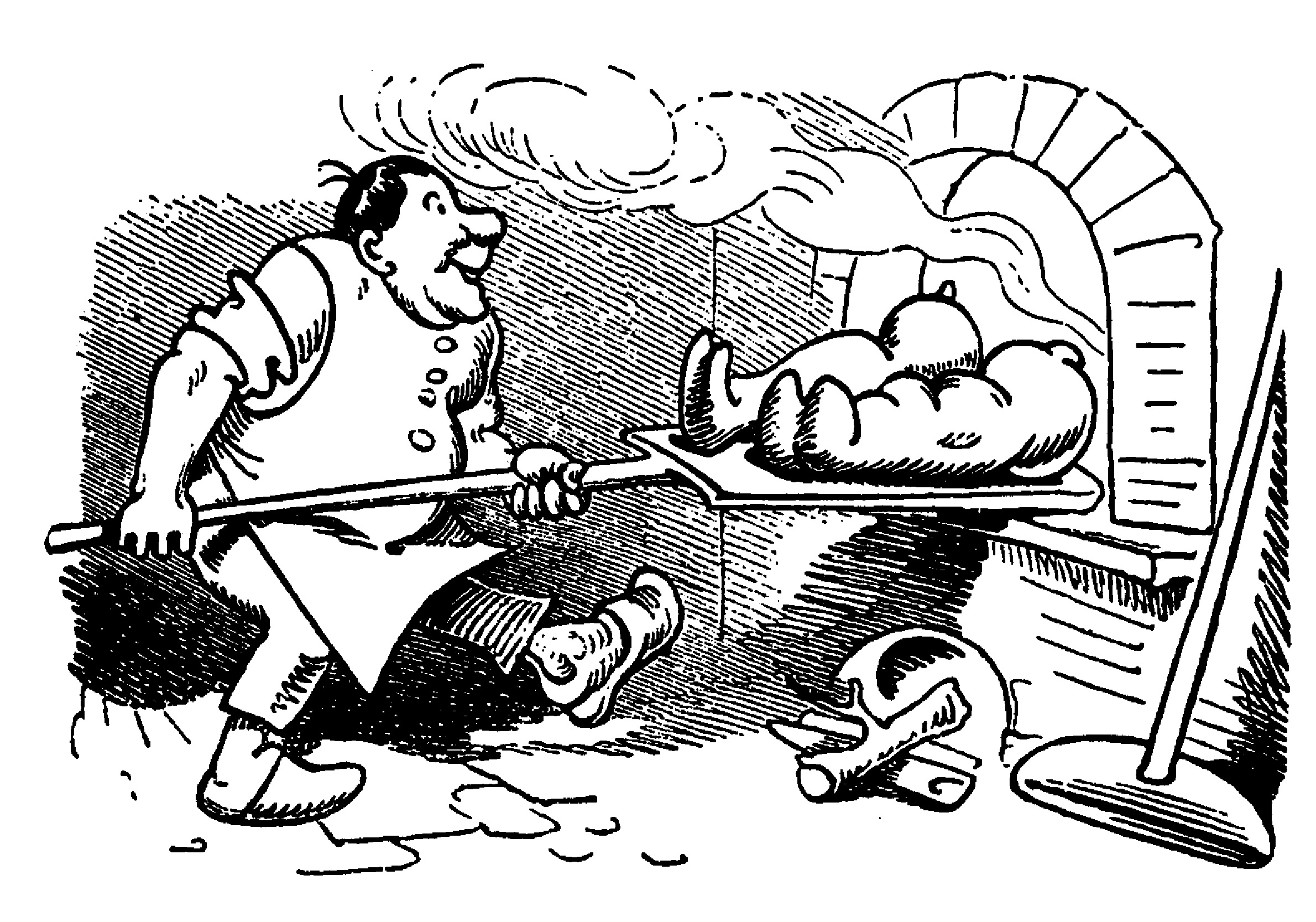
The baker with Max and Moritz covered in dough (sixth trick)

The boys invade a closed bakery to steal some Easter sweets. Attempting to steal pretzels, they fall into a vat of dough. The baker returns, catches the breaded pair, and bakes them. But they survive, and escape by gnawing through their crusts.

==== Final Trick: The Farmer ====
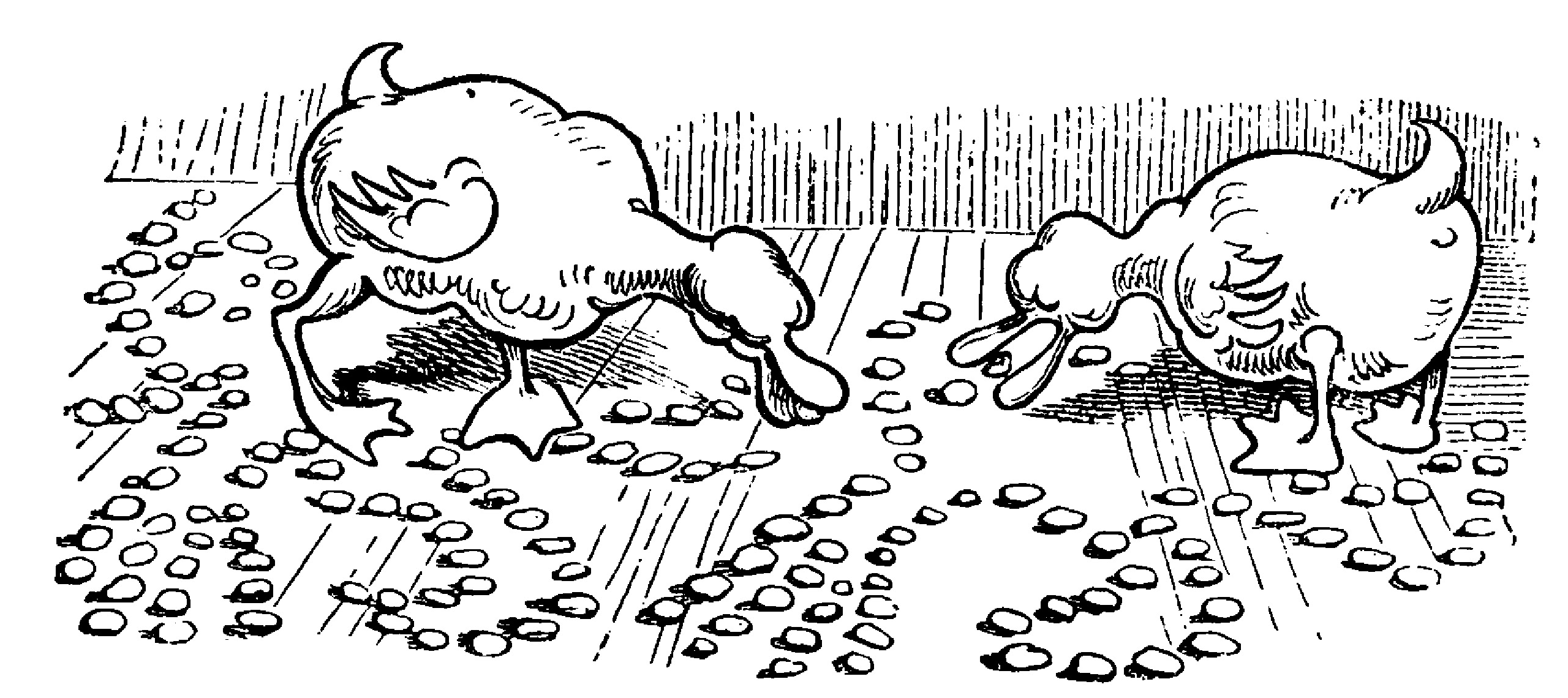
The fate of Max and Moritz (final trick)

Hiding out in the grain storage area of a farmer, Mecke (unnamed in the English version), the boys slit some grain sacks. Carrying away one of the sacks, farmer Mecke immediately notices the problem. He puts the boys in the sack instead, then takes it to the mill. The boys are ground to bits and devoured by the miller's ducks. Later, no one expresses regret.

== Legacy and cultural significance ==
Busch's classic tale of the terrible duo (now in the public domain) has since become a proud part of the culture in German-speaking countries. Even today, parents usually read these tales to their not-yet-literate children. To this day in Germany, Austria, and Switzerland, a certain familiarity with the story and its rhymes is still presumed, as it is often referenced in mass communication. The two leering faces are synonymous with mischief, and appear almost logo-like in advertising and even graffiti.

Max and Moritz is the first published original foreign children's book in Japan, translated into rōmaji by Shinjirō Shibutani and Kaname Oyaizu in 1887 as Wanpaku monogatari ("Naughty stories").

During World War I, the Red Baron, Manfred von Richthofen, named his dog Moritz, giving the name Max to another animal given to his friend.

The two Sturer Emil vehicles produced in World War II were named Max and Moritz by their crews.

After World War II, German-U.S. composer Richard Mohaupt, together with choreographer Alfredo Bortoluzzi, created Max und Moritz, a burlesque dance (German: Tanzburleske), which premiered at Badisches Staatstheater Karlsruhe on 18 December 1949.

The Max and Moritz story inspired Rudolph Dirks to create The Katzenjammer Kids, which would in turn serve as inspiration for Art Clokey to create his antagonists for Gumby, the Blockheads.

Max and Moritz (along with The Katzenjammer Kids) may have served as inspiration for Ragdoll Productions' British children's show Rosie and Jim, Mike Judge's animated series Beavis and Butt-Head, Terrence and Phillip of the Terrence and Phillip Show from South Park (the show's creators, Trey Parker and Matt Stone, having said South Park was inspired by Beavis and Butt-Head), and George Beard and Harold Hutchins in the "Captain Underpants" series by Dav Pilkey.

The Max & Moritz Prize is an award for comic books, comic strips, and other similar materials, awarded at each of the biennial International Comics Shows of Erlangen since 1984.

Der Fall Max und Moritz (English: The Max and Moritz Case), by Jörg M. Günther, published in 1988, is a satirical treatment in which the various misdeeds in the story – both by the protagonists and their surroundings – are analysed via the regulations of the German Strafgesetzbuch.

In 2016, Austrian economist Jürgen Huber and his daughter Mey published Max und Moritz, Frühe Streiche (English: Max and Moritz, Early Pranks), a children's book that adds a new set of pranks to Busch's characters.

In the early 2020s, the Efteling amusement park in the Netherlands opened a pair of rollercoasters named Max & Moritz.

Max and Moritz are featured in The Defeated, a streaming television series distributed by Netflix in 2021. Set in 1946, in post-war Berlin, the two main characters are brothers named "Max" and "Moritz", and the book also features prominently throughout the series.

== Adaptations ==
=== Ballet ===
Max und Moritz was adapted into a ballet by Richard Mohaupt and Alfredo Bortuluzzi.

=== Animated films and TV series ===
- Spuk mit Max und Moritz (1951), by Diehl Film, a production company led by brothers Hermann, Ferdinand and Paul Diehl
- Wilhelm Busch – Die Trickfilm-Parade: Max und Moritz und andere Streiche (1978) by Halas and Batchelor
- Max und Moritz (TV series, 39 episodes, 1999)

=== Live action films ===
- Max and Moritz (1956), by Norbert Schultze
- Die fromme Helene (1965)
- Max und Moritz Reloaded (2005)

== See also ==
- Struwwelpeter
